= Dutch Flat (Arizona) =

Valley in Mohave County, Arizona

- Location within Arizona
- Length: 25 mi (40 km) NW-SE
- Width: 16 mi (26 km)

Geography
- Country: United States
- State: Arizona
- Region: Mojave Desert
- Borders on: List: Sacramento Valley (Arizona); Hualapai Mountains; McCracken Mountains; Aubrey Peak Wilderness; Rawhide Mtns; Mohave Mountains
- Coordinates: 34°39′18″N 113°57′30″W
- River: Buck Mountain Wash
- Interactive map of Dutch Flat

Dutch Flat of Arizona is a valley south of the Sacramento Valley and Interstate 40 in southern Mohave County.

The region is part of the southeast extension of the Mojave Desert into northwest Arizona. Dutch Flat borders the south of the Sacramento Valley, and Sacramento Wash drains west on the northwest perimeter to meet the Colorado River at Needles.

== Description ==
Dutch Flat is a 25-mile (40 km) long valley, trending slightly northwest at its north. It is surrounded by mountain ranges, and the south borders the Aubrey Peak Wilderness at the northwest end of the Rawhide Mountains. The small McCracken Mountains are on the southeast perimeter, south of the Hualapai Mountains. A geology tour, Hike 30, Hiking Arizona's Geology starts from the east at Wikieup, in the Big Sandy River Valley and crosses over the Hualapai's, through Dutch Flat to the Aubrey Peak Wilderness area at Centennial Wash. A separate geology hike is on the same route in the very south of the Hualapai's at the beginning of the route, at Aubrey Peak (Hualapai Mountains).

Dutch Flat can be accessed from the north at Interstate 40, from the east at Wikieup, and from the southwest by way of Lake Havasu City.

== Geography ==
Yucca is located at 34°52′20″N 114°08′58″W, on the northeast perimeter of Dutch Flat. The small range of the McCracken Mountains is located at 34.5027°N 113.7630°W, on the southeast border. Franconia, Arizona is southwest of Yucca on Interstate 40 in Arizona.
