= Rawhide Mountains =

Landform in Mohave County, Arizona

- Location within Arizona

Highest point
- Peak: Aubrey Peak (Rawhide Mountains)
- Elevation: 2,953 ft (900 m)

Dimensions
- Length: 15 mi (24 km) NW-SE
- Width: 9 mi (14 km)

Geography
- Country: United States
- State: Arizona
- Region(s): Maria fold and thrust belt ((southeast)-Mojave Desert) ((northwest)-Sonoran Desert)
- County: Mohave County, Arizona
- Settlement(s): Swansea, AZ-(ghost town) & Parker Dam, California
- Range coordinates: 34°18′09″N 113°42′04″W
- Borders on: Bill Williams River

The Rawhide Mountains are a mountain range of western Arizona, in the southwest of Mohave County. It is part of a block of mountain ranges on the north of an insular region called the Maria fold and thrust belt, containing mountain ranges, valleys, and plains. The Rawhide Mountains border the much smaller Artillery Mountains southeast, bordering on Alamo Lake State Park and the south-flowing Big Sandy River.

The border to the southwest are the Bill Williams Mountains, and the Poachie Range with the large Arrastra Mountain Wilderness is northeast and east.

The high point of the range is Aubrey Peak at 2,953 feet (900 m). Two other peaks lie at the southeast, Miller Peak at 2,793 feet (851 m) and Fools Peak at 2,939 feet (896 m).

The southern perimeter of the Rawhide Mountains is the west-flowing Bill Williams River. The river is part of the northern border of the Maria fold and thrust belt with the block of mountains north forming the border, and is also part of the southeast Mojave Desert, another de facto border.

South of the river is the northwestern Sonoran Desert. The major mountain block at the intersection of this region west in California is the Whipple Mountains of southeast California, in the northeast Colorado Desert (the northwestern Sonoran Desert). The Whipple Mountains cause the south-flowing Colorado River to traverse southeast, then back southwest around the Whipple Mountains massif. The Colorado then turns back to the south. (It makes another excursion south of the Trigo Mountains massif.)

== Rawhide Mountains and Aubrey Peak Wildernesses ==
Approximately half of the Rawhide Mountains contain wilderness areas.

=== Aubrey Peak Wilderness ===
The northwest of the range consists of the Aubrey Peak Wilderness, of 15,400-acre (6,232 ha). It is accessed by unimproved dirt roads, which are on the southwest and southeast perimeter. Two geologic hikes are profiled in the region. The route starts at Wikieup and Hike 29 is in the southern Hualapai Mountains at a mountain saddle. The route is the access to Centennial Wash, Hike 30, where the wash is part of the southeast border of the Aubrey Peak Wilderness.

=== Rawhide Mountains Wilderness ===
The Rawhide Mountains Wilderness is a large wilderness that is on both banks of the Bill Williams River, and the confluence of the Big Sandy River. It is in the northeast of the Buckskin Mountains, the southeast of the Rawhide's and forms the western border of Alamo Lake, at Alamo Lake State Park.
