= Poachie Range =

Landform in La Paz, Mohave, and Yavapai Counties, Arizona

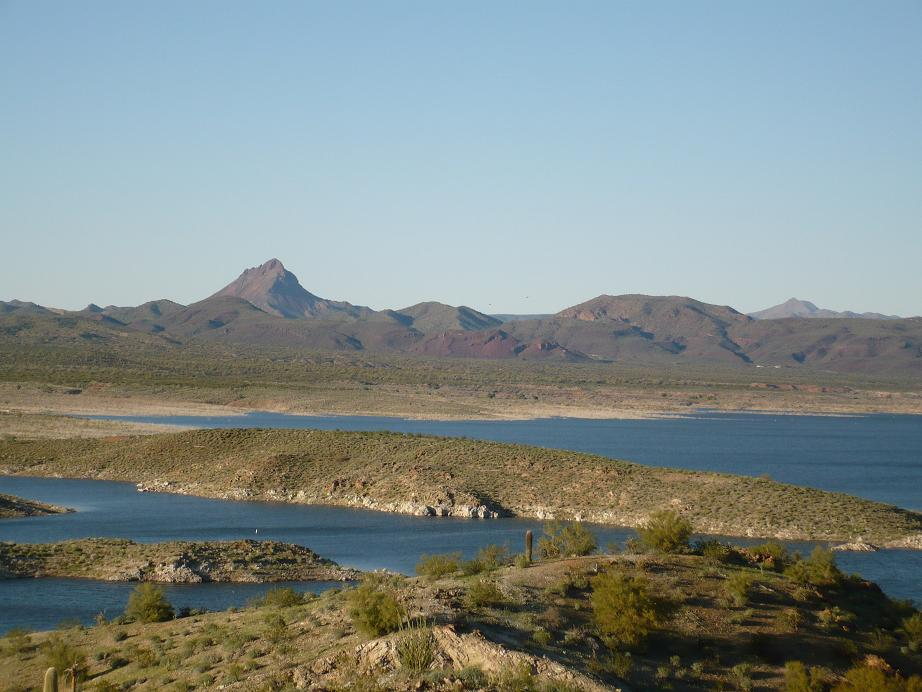
- Alamo Lake

Highest point
- Peak: Arrastra Mountain
- Elevation: 4,807 ft (1,465 m)
- Coordinates: 34°25′16″N 113°22′56″W

Dimensions
- Length: 28 mi (45 km) (E-W)
- Width: 8 mi (13 km)

Geography
- Location within Arizona
- Country: United States
- State: Arizona
- Regions: Mojave Desert and Sonoran Desert
- Counties: Mohave and Yavapai
- Settlements: Wikieup and Nothing
- Range coordinates: 34°28′09″N 113°29′11″W
- Borders on: Rawhide Mountains, Dutch Flat, Hualapai Mountains, Black Mountains, Alamo Lake State Park, Buckskin Mtns, Butler Valley and U.S. Route 93

The Poachie Range is a moderate length mountain range and massif in southeast Mohave County, Arizona, and the extreme southwest corner of Yavapai County; the range also abuts the northeast corner of La Paz County. The Poachie Range massif is bordered by the south-flowing Big Sandy River on its west, and the west-flowing Santa Maria River on its south; both rivers converge at the Poachie Range's southwest at Alamo Lake in Alamo Lake State Park.

From Alamo Lake, the (short) Bill Williams River flows due west for 35 mi to meet the Colorado River. The Bill Williams River is the de facto border between the Mojave Desert north and northwest; the Sonoran Desert is south and southeast. Across the south-flowing Colorado River to the west, is the massif of the Whipple Mountains at the northeast of the Sonoran Desert subsection named the Colorado Desert of southern California and bordered by the Colorado River.

The entire region south of the Poachie Range, and its two mountain ranges bordered westwards, the Rawhide and Bill Williams Mountain, and bordered on the Bill Williams River northern bank — is the Maria fold and thrust belt. The thrust belt is a geographic and geologic region at the convergence of these neighboring mountain ranges, rivers, the Alamo Lake, as well as other plains and valleys.

== Range description ==
The Poachie Range is approximately 30 mi long slightly trending northwest by southeast, with no central ridgeline. Instead the range is made up of a central canyon draining southwest. The west-northwest contains a small canyon, and various peaks, three peaks west of the south-flowing Big Sandy River. Signal, Arizona with only unimproved road access is at the northwest foothills, about 10 mi from U.S. Route 93.

The east and southeast of the range contains People's Canyon, about 5 mi long, and the west-flowing Santa Maria River; to the southeast the river borders the northwest of the smaller range, the Black Mountains.

The highpoint of the range is Arrastra Mountain, 4,807 feet (1,465 m), located at 34.31252°N 113.31325°W. Arrastra Mountain is at the range center, 3 mi northeast of the 'range ridgeline' and 4 mi southwest of U.S. Route 93 in Arizona (the Joshua Tree Highway).

=== Arrastra Mountain Wilderness ===
The Arrastra Mountain Wilderness comprises almost 100% of the Poachie Range. Both the Big Sandy and Santa Maria Rivers are mostly contained in the wilderness, as well as People's Canyon in the east.

== Access ==
The entire northeast of the range is accessed from U.S. Route 93, from Wikieup, Arizona and Nothing, Arizona.

== See also ==
- Maria fold and thrust belt
