= Big Sandy lithium mine =

Mine in Arizona

Big Sandy Lithium Mine
- Location in Arizona
- Location: Wikieup, Arizona, United States; 34°42′15″N 113°34′43″W
- Products: Lithium
- Company: Arizona Lithium
- Website: www.arizonalithium.com/big-sandy/

The Big Sandy lithium project, or Big Sandy lithium mine, is a planned lithium mining project located near the Hualapai tribe's Cholla Canyon Ranch and the Cofer Hot Springs, near Wikieup in the Big Sandy River Valley, Arizona, U.S.

The project is owned by Arizona Lithium and, since 2022, has been developed in partnership with the Navajo Nation mining company, Navajo Transitional Energy Company.

The Hualapai tribe has been critical of the Bureau of Land Management's environmental assessment of the project, protesting that the mine would destroy their sacred and cultural sites.

== Description and location ==
Big Sandy lithium mine is located in the Big Sandy River Valley on Bureau of Land Management owned land that is considered sacred by the nearby Hualapai Native American tribe. The location is near the tribe's Cholla Canyon Ranch and the Cofer Hot Springs.

The location is within driving distance of the Tesla electric vehicle plant in Nevada.

The mine is estimated to produce 32.5 million tonnes of ore with 1,850 parts per million of lithium, totalling 320,800 tons of Li₂CO₃.

== History ==
Since 2017, 50 boreholes have been drilled by USA Lithium Ltd, a subsidiary of Australian company Hawkstone Mining. Hawkstone Mining was later renamed Arizona Lithium.

In the summer of 2020, the Bureau of Land Management sought the Hualapai tribe's input on the mining plans before rejecting their request to serve in a coordination role on the project. The Bureau of Land Management identified four Indigenous cultural sites in areas where drilling is planned and plans to attempt to avoid damaging one of them. In April 2021, the Inter Tribal Association of Arizona, a group of Indigenous nations, was critical of the Bureau of Land Management's process, describing their environmental assessment as “grossly insufficient.” In 2021, the American Institute for Economic Research stated that the planned development of the Big Sandy lithium mine would destroy the Cofer Hot Springs, a site sacred to the Hualapai people.

In October 2022, Arizona Lithium signed an informal agreement with Cemvita Factory to use its Tempe, Arizona, production facility to process lithium. In December 2022, the company announced a partnership with the Navajo Nation mining company, Navajo Transitional Energy Company. The partnership will see the Native American run company manage regulatory approvals, planning, mine design, and construction.

== See also ==
- Dakota Access Pipeline protests
