= Arizona Lithium =

Australian mining company

- Traded as: ASX:AZL
- Industry: Mining
- Predecessor: Hawkstone Mining
- Headquarters: West Perth, Western Australia, Australia
- Key people: Paul Lloyd, Managing Director
- Products: Lithium
- Website: www.arizonalithium.com

Arizona Lithium is an Australian owned mining company previously known as Hawkstone Mining.

The company purchased USA Lithium in 2018 and is developing the Big Sandy lithium mine.

== Organization ==
The company is located at Level 2, 10 Outram Street, West Perth, Western Australia. Its managing director is Paul Lloyd.

The company was previously known as Hawkstone Mining.

== Activities ==
The company is working on the Big Sandy lithium mine located on Bureau of Land Management land in Wikieup, Arizona. The location is proximate to the Hualapai tribe's Cholla Canyon Ranch and the nearby Cofer Hot Springs, considered sacred to the tribe. In 2021, the American Institute for Economic Research stated that the planned development of the mine would destroy the springs. In October 2022, Arizona Lithium signed an informal agreement with Cemvita Factory to use their Tempe, Arizona production facility to process lithium. In December 2022, the company formed a partnership with the Navajo Nation's Navajo Transitional Energy Company to collaborate on the mine.

In December 2022, the company offered to buy Saskatchewan-based Canadian company Prairie Lithium.

== Profitability ==
The company's share prince dropped nearly 23% in 2018 when it announced that is had abandoned plans to buy USA Lithium. Later the same month when the company announced the deal was back on, the share price closed 32% up.
