= Aubrey (disambiguation) =

Aubrey is a given name and surname of French origin.

Aubrey may also refer to:

== Places ==
United States

- Aubrey, Alaska
- Aubrey, Arkansas
- Aubrey, Texas
- Aubrey, Wisconsin
- Aubrey Cliffs, at Aubrey and Prospect Valleys, south of west Grand Canyon, Arizona
- Aubrey Peak (Hualapai Mountains), Hualapai Mountains, Arizona
- Aubrey Peak (Rawhide Mountains), Aubrey Peak Wilderness, Arizona
- Aubrey Valley, Mohave County, Arizona
- Fort Aubrey, Hamilton County, Kansas

Canada

- Aubrey Island, Nunavut

== Popular culture ==
- "Aubrey" (The X-Files), a second-season episode of The X-Files
- "Aubrey" (song), a song by Bread from the album Guitar Man
- Aubrey (TV series), a 1980 British cartoon series
- AUBREY, a character in the 2020 role-playing video game Omori

== Entertainers ==
- Aubrey Ayala, a vocal artist from Philadelphia
- Aubrey Plaza, American actress, comedian, and producer

== See also ==
- Aubry (disambiguation)
