= Whipple Mountains Wilderness =

Protected wilderness area in California, United States

- IUCN category Ib (wilderness area)
- Location within California Location within the United States
- Interactive map of Whipple Mountains Wilderness
- Location: San Bernardino County, California, United States
- Nearest city: Parker Dam, California
- Coordinates: 34.31450°N 114.411°W
- Area: 76,122 acres (30,805 ha)
- Established: 1994
- Governing body: Bureau of Land Management

The Whipple Mountains Wilderness is a 76,122-acre (30,805 ha) wilderness administered by the Bureau of Land Management (BLM). Most of the Whipple Mountains are within the wilderness area. It is located in the northeastern Colorado Desert near the Colorado River. Lake Havasu and Lake Havasu City are 25 miles (40 km) to the North. Earp, California and Parker, Arizona are 20 miles (32 km) to the South. The Parker Dam is 8 miles (13 km) due east.

The western portion of the mountain range has pale green formations, differing from the eastern, steeply carved and striking brick-red volcanics. Landforms are diverse and range from valley floors and washes to steep-walled canyons, domed peaks, natural bridges, and eroded spires.

The mountains mark a major direction change of the north-south Colorado, as it changes directions to southeast, then southwest around the eastern perimeter of the range. The highest point of the mountains, and the Whipple Mountains Wilderness is Whipple Mountain at 4,131 feet (1,259 m).

== Flora and fauna ==
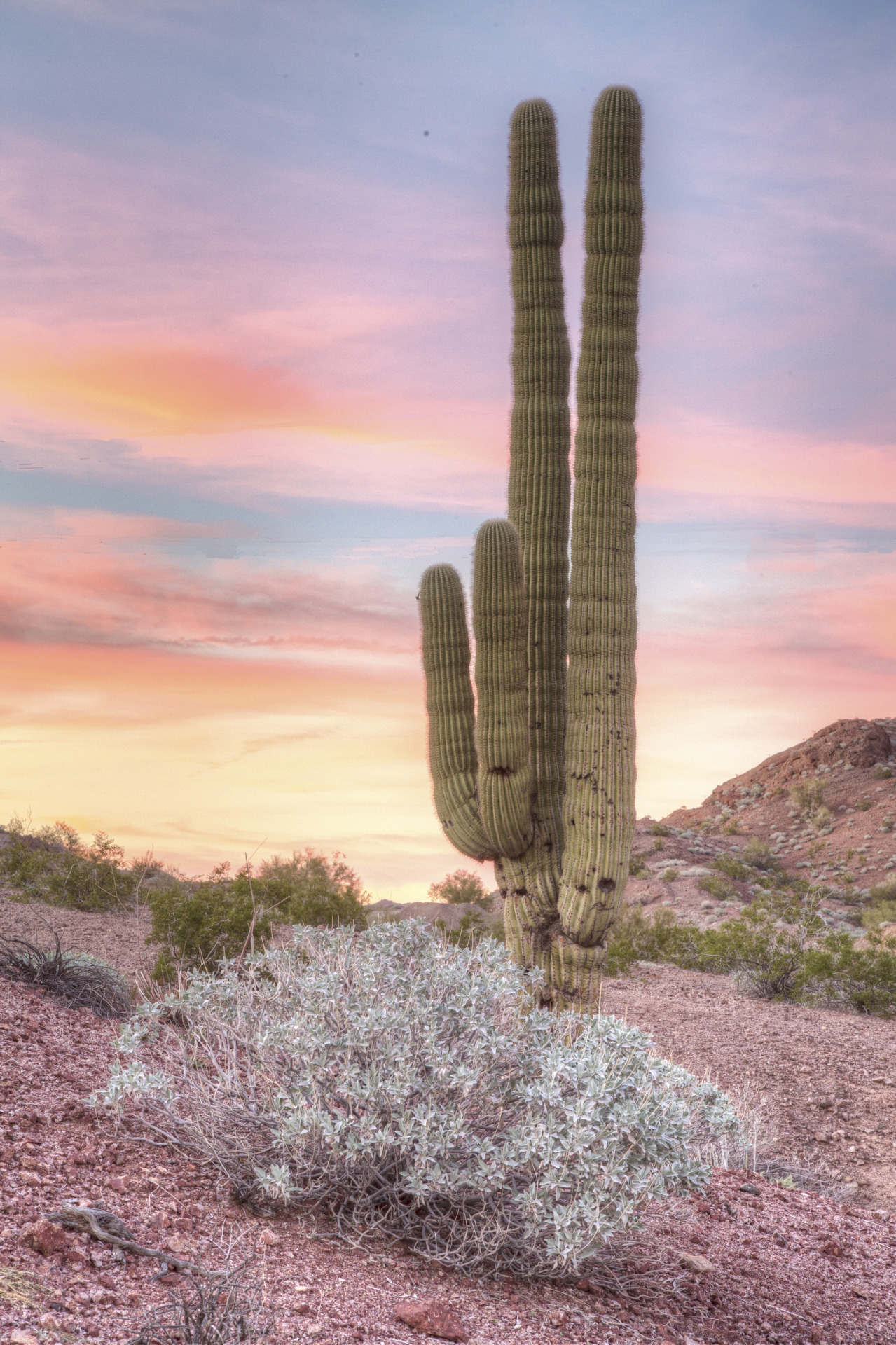
Whipple Mountains Wilderness.

The two major habitats here are the Sonoran xeric bush scrub with creosote bush, and Sonoran thorn forest with Velvet mesquite. The dominant vegetation-type is commonly referred to creosote bush scrub, with palo verde, desert Ironwood, smoketree, and numerous species of cacti including cholla, saguaro, foxtail, and prickly pear.

Wildlife species include the desert bighorn sheep, mule deer, wild burro, coyote, black-tailed jackrabbit, ground squirrels, kangaroo rats, quail, roadrunners, owls, several species of rattlesnakes and lizards, and the threatened desert tortoise. The Whipple Mountains provide superior nesting and foraging habitat for a number of raptors; including prairie falcon, golden eagle, red-tailed hawk, and Cooper's hawk.

== Activities ==
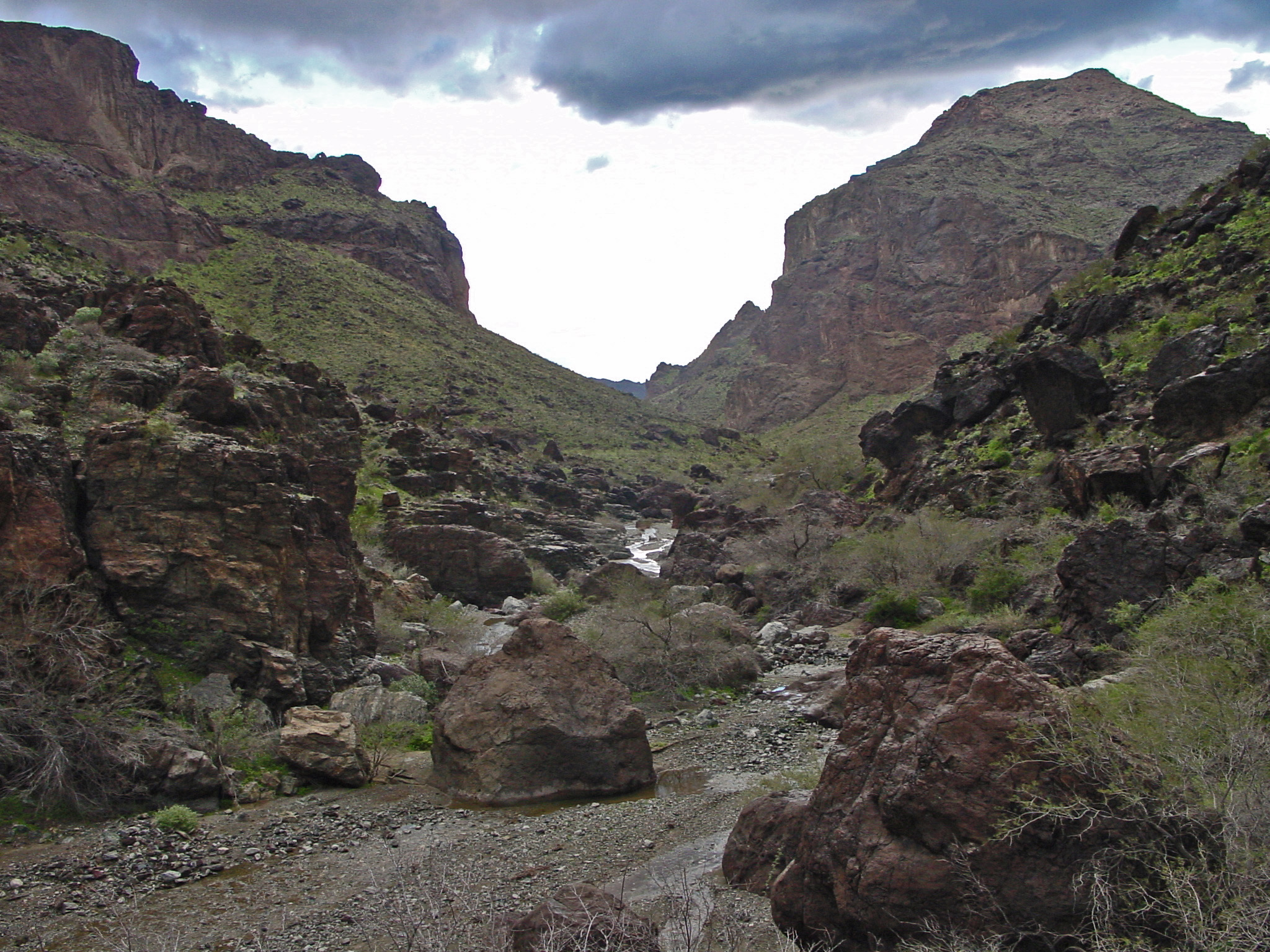
The mouth of Whipple Wash in the north-eastern Whipple Mountains, with atypical greenery and water visible during a wet winter.

To protect the fragile and rare habitats of the Whipples, wheeled and motorized vehicles are excluded from the entire wilderness area. Hiking and horseback riding are the primary means of accessing the interior of the range. The most frequently used route for these activities lies in Whipple Wash (see photo) which bisects the range from southwest to northeast. Motorized access to the boundary of the wilderness is possible only from the north-east by way of a power line access road. This road may require high-clearance or four-wheel-drive vehicles. No permit is required for individual access, but a permit is required by the BLM for commercial or organized group access.

Popular activities include hiking, horseback riding, hunting, camping, rock hounding, photography, and backpacking. Whipple Wash is a popular hiking location.

== See also ==
- Whipple Mountains
