= Aquarius Mountains =

Mountain range in Mohave County, Arizona

- Location within Arizona

Highest point
- Peak: Snow Mountain (Arizona)
- Elevation: 5,879 ft (1,792 m)
- Coordinates: 35°03′38″N 113°30′19″W

Dimensions
- Length: 45 mi (72 km) N-S
- Width: 15 mi (24 km)

Geography
- Country: United States
- State: Arizona
- Regions: Arizona transition zone and Mojave Desert
- County: Mohave
- Settlements: Wikieup, Cane Springs and Kingman
- Range coordinates: 34°55′05″N 113°26′29″W
- Borders on: Hualapai Mountains, Big Sandy River, Peacock Mountains, I-40, Mohon Mountains, Goodwin Mesa, Burro Creek Wilderness, McCracken Mountains and Poachie Range

The Aquarius Mountains are a 45-mi (72 km) long mountain range in southeast Mohave County, Arizona. The range lies in the northwest of the Arizona transition zone, and at the southwest of the Coconino Plateau, a subsection of the Colorado Plateau.

The Aquarius Mountains are on the perimeter of the transition zone, and border the south-flowing Big Sandy River and Valley on its west; adjacent further west is the massif of the Hualapai Mountains, a block faulted Basin and Range landform bordered westwards by the north–south Sacramento Valley.

Mohave County and northwest Arizona, is also a southeastwards extension of the Mojave Desert which extends down to Wickenburg, Arizona, on the southwest perimeter of the Arizona transition zone. Joshua trees can be found here, and the route north from Wickenburg, U.S. Route 93 in Arizona is called the Joshua Tree Highway. The region is at the northwest border of Arizona's Sonoran Desert region of the lower elevation deserts, as they merge northwest into higher elevations of Mohave County.

== Description ==
The Aquarius Mountains are mostly a north–south range that curves slightly south-southeast in the south. The north of the range merges into a hill and mountain peak region at the northwest of an adjacent range eastwards, the northwest–southeast Mohon Mountains. The merged area of the two ranges in the north contains Trout and Knight Creeks, both westward-flowing towards the Big Sandy River & Valley ( both due-south trending along a fault). Seven named peaks are around the two creeks, and Cedar Basin. The highpoint of the mountain range occurs here, Snow Mountain (Arizona), 5,879 feet (1,792 m). The second highest peak in the range occurs in the extreme southwest, Grey Mountain, 5,261 feet (1,604 m) in the Aquarius Cliffs, part of the Aquarius Fault, a southern extension from the Grand Wash Cliffs and Fault.

== Access ==
U.S. Route 93 travels north–south through the Big Sandy River Valley on the range's west. At Wikieup, Arizona at the range's southwest, and near Neale and Goodwin Mesas, Route 93 turns southeast to Wickenburg, about 65 mi (105 km) distant. North regions of the range can be accessed south of Interstate 40.
