= Centennial Wash (Mohave County) =

Waterway in Arizona

- Centennial Wash (Mohave County) in Arizona

Location
- Country: United States
- State: Arizona
- Region: Rawhide Mountains ((southeast)-Mojave Desert) ((northwest)-Sonoran Desert)
- District: Mohave County, Arizona

Physical characteristics
- Length: 10 mi (16 km), SW-NE

The Centennial Wash (Mohave County) is a northern minor wash tributary to the west-flowing Bill Williams River. The wash drains from the western third of the Rawhide Mountains, and partially forms the southeast border of the wilderness at the northwest of the Rawhide's, the Aubrey Peak Wilderness.

== Geology ==
Being part of the Basin and Range, the Rawhide Mountains are profiled in trail guides, specifically books focussed on geology. The Centennial Wash, Hike 30' is profiled in Hiking Arizona's Geology, as one of fifteen hikes in the "Basin and Range Province" of Arizona. The trail hike begins by jeep at Wikieup, Arizona on U.S. Route 93 in Arizona and proceeds west over the Hualapai Mountains. The trail hike traverses adjacent the Aubrey Peak Wilderness.
