= Santa Maria River (Arizona) =

Intermittent stream in Arizona

Coordinates: 34°18′38″N 113°31′35″W

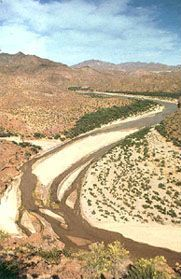
- Seasonal flows in the Arrastra wilderness

- Location of the mouth of Santa Maria River in Arizona

Location
- Country: United States
- State: Arizona

Physical characteristics
- Source
  - elevation: 2,640 feet (800 m)
- Mouth
  - location: Alamo Lake
  - elevation: 1,240 feet (380 m)
- Length: 50 miles (80 km)
- Discharge
  - average: 11.59 cu ft/s (0.328 m^{3}/s)

The Santa Maria River is an intermittent stream located in western Arizona. It is a primary tributary of the Bill Williams River and one of the main sources of inflow for Alamo Lake. The river forms a portion of the boundary between Mohave and La Paz counties.

== Course ==
The Santa Maria River is formed by the confluence of the Sycamore and Kirkland Creeks, about 10 miles (16 km) east of the community of Bagdad. From the confluence, the river flows in a generally southwesterly direction through the rugged Arrastra Mountain Wilderness area (Poachie Range–Black Mountains). The river accepts a number of smaller, intermittent streams throughout its length.

The river joins the Big Sandy River to form the Bill Williams River just upstream of Alamo Lake. During periods of heavy rainfall, the lake may extend beyond the confluence point, during which period the Santa Maria empties directly into the lake rather than joining the Big Sandy River.

The total length of the river is approximately 50 miles (80 km), 17 miles (27 km) of which are considered perennial stream. The remainder is ephemeral and runs only during periods of heavy rain.

== See also ==
- List of rivers of Arizona
