= The Boy in the Box =

The Boy in the Box or Boy in a Box may refer to:

- Joseph Augustus Zarelli, a 1957 child homicide victim previously known as the "Boy in the Box" or "Boy in a Box"
- The Boy in the Box (Vidal, California), a trial held at the Riverside County Superior Court in Indio, California in 1969 and 1970
- Boy in the Box (album), a 1985 album by Corey Hart
- "The Boy in the Box", an episode of Cold Case
- Stolen (2009 American film), a 2009 American mystery film conceived as The Boy in the Box
