= Aubry (disambiguation) =

Aubry is a given name and surname of French origin.

Aubry may also refer to:

- Aubry, Ouest, village in Haiti
- Aubry, Kansas, United States
- Aubry Township, Johnson County, Kansas
- Aubry v Éditions Vice-Versa Inc, a leading Canadian Supreme Court of Canada case on privacy rights in Quebec

== See also ==
- Aubrey (disambiguation)
