= Aubrey Peak Wilderness =

Protected area in Mohave County, Arizona, US

- IUCN category Ib (wilderness area)
- Location within the United States
- Location: Mohave County, Arizona, U.S.
- Nearest city: Lake Havasu City, Arizona
- Coordinates: 34.4014050°N 113.8146608°W
- Area: 15,400 acres (6,230 ha)
- Designated: 1990
- Governing body: Bureau of Land Management

The Aubrey Peak Wilderness is a 15,400-acre (6,230 ha) wilderness administered by the Bureau of Land Management (BLM). The wilderness is located in northwest Arizona in the southwest of Mohave County, a region of the southeastern Mojave Desert's extension into northwest Arizona.

== Geography ==
The wilderness is one of two in the Rawhide Mountains, which border the north bank of the west-flowing Bill Williams River. The other wilderness is on both sides of the river, the Rawhide Mountains Wilderness; the section south of the river is in the northeast of the Buckskin Mountains, and the southeast of the Rawhides. The Buckskin Wilderness is on the western border of Alamo Lake, of Alamo Lake State Park.

The Aubrey Peak Wilderness is about 15 miles (24 km) northeast of Parker Dam, California on the Colorado River, near its confluence with the Bill Williams.

The confluence has the following sites:

1. Bill Williams National Wildlife Preserve
2. Buckskin Mountain State Park
3. Cattail Cove State Park
4. Parker Dam

== Peaks of the wilderness ==
The highest elevation in the wilderness is Aubrey Peak in the Rawhide Mountains, at 2,953 feet (900 m). A taller peak with the same name is Aubrey Peak, in the Hualapai Mountains with an elevation of 5,078 feet (1,548 m).

== See also ==
- List of LCRV Wilderness Areas (Colorado River)
- List of Arizona Wilderness Areas
