= Cholla Canyon Ranch =

Populated place in Arizona, U.S.

- Location within Arizona

General information
- Location: Wikieup, Arizona, United States
- Coordinates: 34.695546°N 113.574378°W
- Owner: Hualapai Native American tribe

Cholla Canyon Ranch is a ranch in Arizona owned by the Hualapai Native American tribe.

== Description ==
The ranch is located near Wikieup, Arizona in the Big Sandy River Valley approximately equidistant between Phoenix and Las Vegas.

The 360 acres ranch is situated near Ha’ Kamwe’ (English: Cofer Hot Springs) that are considered to be sacred by the Hualapai. In 2014, Mohave County supported the Hualapai's efforts to limit groundwater withdrawals from the springs.

As of 2021, Ivan Bender was the caretaker of the ranch.
