= Solar Lodge =

American occult lodge, 1965–1972

Solar Lodge was a magical organization in California that was established in 1965, and withdrew from initiatory activity in 1972. It was based on ideas from the curriculum of A∴A∴, an order that was established by Aleister Crowley in 1907.

According to Frater Shiva, Solar Lodge was set in motion by the initiation of Georgina "Jean" Brayton ("Soror Capricornus") by Ray Burlingame ("Frater Aquarius") in 1962. In 1965, shortly before his death, Burlingame instructed Brayton to initiate other people into the lodge, which she did, expanding Solar Lodge in the 1960s to include over 50 members.

The lodge presented itself as a body of Ordo Templi Orientis, but predated the revival of O.T.O. by Grady McMurtry in 1969, who never recognized Solar Lodge as a valid body. O.T.O. considers Solar Lodge "clandestine", much as Freemasons consider the O.T.O. a form of clandestine Masonry.

By 1967, the Lodge owned several small mansions, a gas station, a bookstore, all in Los Angeles, and a desert property known as Solar Ranch in the Sonoran desert. By 1969, the Lodge ran a bookstore in Blythe, California; it operated Solar Ranch near Vidal, California; and it owned a gas station in Vidal with a cafe, motel, bar, house, gas station and grocery store.

In July 1969, the members of the lodge were charged with mistreatment of the six-year-old son of one of the members in a case that came to be known as "The Boy in the Box". Brayton, her husband, and other officers of the lodge engaged in "interstate flight to avoid prosecution", traveled to Mexico and Canada, and eventually engaged in a publicity campaign that alleged a conspiracy against them by law enforcement officers and the courts. Initially, a few members went to jail for 6 months on a felony conviction, a few went to jail for 3 months on a misdemeanor conviction, and a few had their charges dismissed. When Brayton and her husband were arrested, she pleaded no contest and was sentenced to three years of probation along with a $500 fine.
