= Whipple Mountains =

Landform in San Bernardino County, Arizona

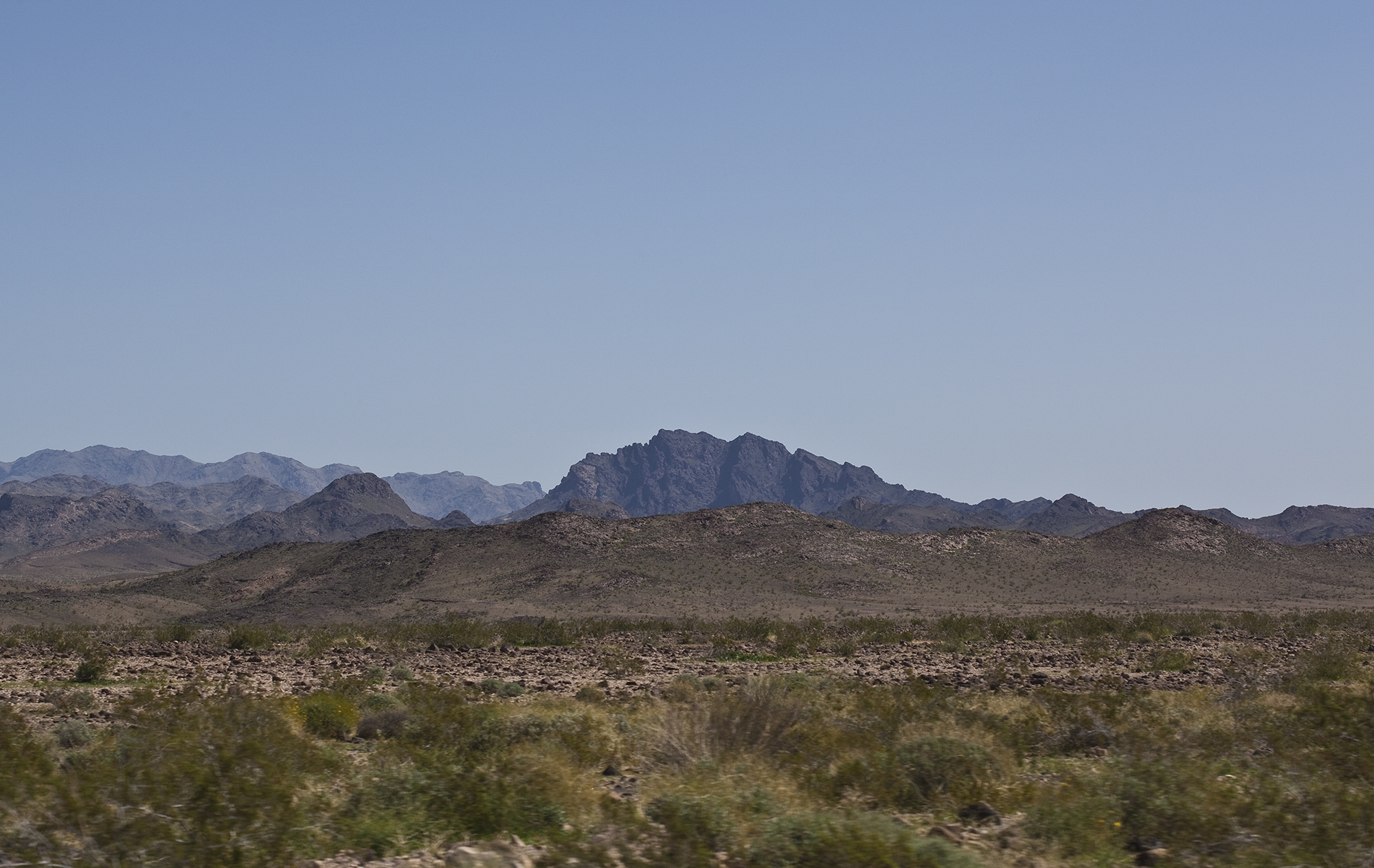
- This view looks east at the west flank of the Whipple Mountains in the Californian Mojave Desert.

Highest point
- Peak: Whipple Peak
- Elevation: 4,131 ft (1,259 m)

Dimensions
- Length: 20 mi (32 km) N-S
- Width: 25 mi (40 km) E-W

Geography
- Location within California
- Country: United States
- State: California
- Region(s): Colorado Desert ((northwest)-Sonoran Desert)
- District: San Bernardino County
- Range coordinates: 34°17′53″N 114°26′18″W
- Borders on: Colorado River-NE & SE; California State Route 62-S
- Topo map: USGS Whipple Mountains SW

The Whipple Mountains (Mojave: Avii Kur'utat; Chemehuevi: Wiyaatuʷa̱) are located in eastern San Bernardino County, California. They are directly west of the Colorado River, Parker Dam, and Lake Havasu; south of Needles, California; north of Parker, Arizona and Vidal, California; and northeast of Vidal Junction, California.

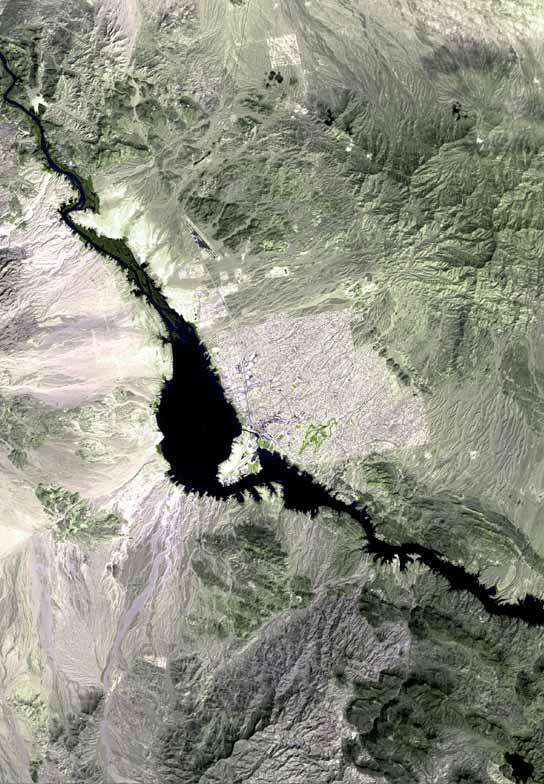
The Whipple mountain massif at photo bottom southwest of the Colorado River.

The mountain forms a major direction change of the north-south Colorado River as it changes directions to southeast, then southwest around the eastern perimeter of the Whipple Mountains. The highest point of the mountains, and the Whipple Mountains Wilderness is Whipple Mountain at 4,131 feet (1,259 m). The western portion of the mountain range has pale green formations, differing from the eastern, steeply carved and striking brick-red volcanics. Landforms are diverse and range from valley floors and washes to steep-walled canyons, domed peaks, natural bridges, and eroded spires.

The mountains were named after Amiel Weeks Whipple, a lieutenant in the US Army who surveyed the region in the 1840s, and later died in Chancellorsville in the Civil War.

== Geography ==
The range stretches approximately 25 miles (40 km) in an east-west direction, and reaches an elevation of 2,695 feet (821 m) at Savahia Peak at the western end. The Whipple Mountains are home to many mines including the Independence Mine and Bessie Mine. The range lies in the Colorado Desert, the northwestern section of the Sonoran Desert, and in the Lower Colorado River Valley region. The Turtle Mountains are to the west, the Mopah Range adjacent on the south, and the Chemehuevi Mountains upriver to the north. Whipple Peak is the highest point in the range at an elevation of 4,131 ft; it lies west of the range's center, and Whipple Wash flows northeast from the peak.

The following United States Geological Survey (USGS) 7.5' Quadrangle maps provide coverage of the Whipple Mountains:

- Gene Wash
- Havasu Lake
- Lake Havasu City South
- Parker
- Parker NW
- Savahia Peak
- Whipple Mountains SW
- Whipple Wash

== Climate ==
Data from the Western Regional Climate Center reveals this to be a region of extreme aridity (<150 mm/yr), very high summer temperatures (+40 °C) and mild winter temperatures.

== Geology ==
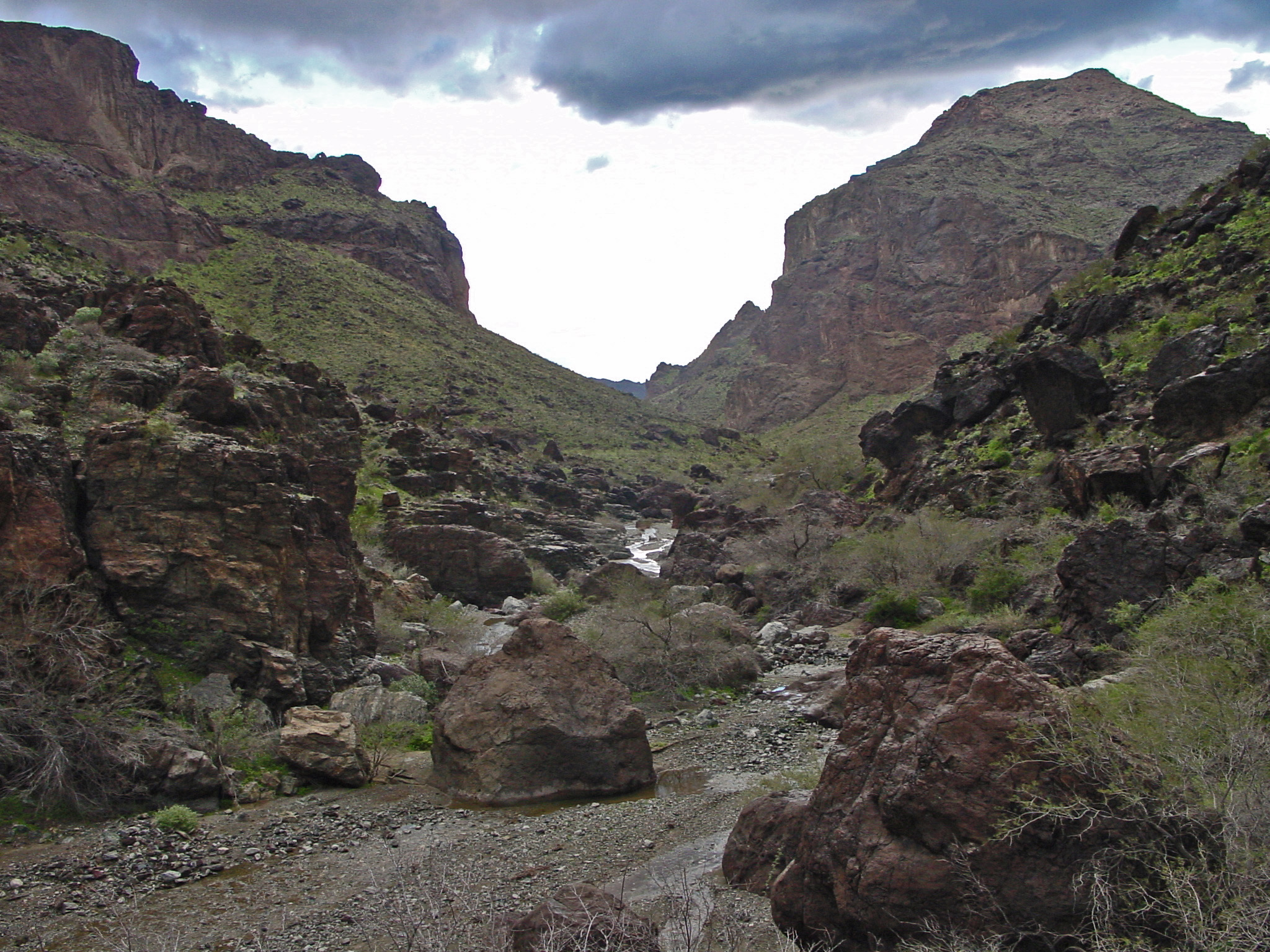
The mouth of Whipple Wash in the north-eastern Whipple Mountains, with atypical greenery and water visible during a wet winter.

The present-day landform of the Whipple Mountains is a series of sub-parallel ridges trending northwest to southeast, cut at right angles by a large wash, (Whipple Wash), which bisects the entire range. These linear ridges mark the tops of tilted crustal blocks lying in the hanging wall of an extensive detachment fault, and the range as a whole comprises one of the best exposed and most studied metamorphic core complexes in the world.

In the western half of the range, the hanging wall has been eroded away completely, leaving antiformally upwarped lower-crustal mylonites exposed at the surface. To the east, unaltered tertiary volcanic and sedimentary rocks along with non-mylonitic crystalline Pre-Cambrian rock in the hanging wall form the land surface, but the larger washes provide access to the detachment surface and the rocks surrounding it. Excellent examples of hydrothermal alteration, fluidized cataclasite injection, and other mid- and upper-crustal fault processes abound along the detachment surface. A number of high-angle normal faults accommodating tilting and extension within the hanging wall are easily visible as well.

The Whipple detachment fault is part of a larger complex of shallow, east dipping normal faults extending from the Whipples northward to the southern tip of Nevada, where a transition occurs to shallow, westward dipping normal faults. The entire region accommodated major crustal extension between the Sierra Nevada block and the Colorado Plateau during the early and middle Miocene. Upwards of 40 km of extension occurred in a region now 70 to 100 km across. The Whipples are part of the Maria fold and thrust belt.

== History ==
The Mojave people, Cahuilla people, Quechan, and other Native American cultural tribes and groups lived in and traveled through the Whipples for thousands of years.

Francisco Garcés, the explorer, missionary, and regional "peacemaker" based at Mission San Xavier del Bac had initiated expeditions along the river and surrounding terrain through and past the Whipples in the early 1770s. In 1774 he joined the famous Juan Bautista de Anza Las Californias Expedition from "mainland New Spain to the "new to them" Alta California. They passed through the range en route to the Needles area and onwards inland, traveling in peace with the local indigenous people west of the river. In the early 1900s Wyatt Earp spent his last winters here. He worked small gold and copper mining claims, starting around 1906. The nearby townsite of Earp, California on and near those claims was named for him, although his residence actually stands in the town of Vidal, California.

Currently, portions of the range within and without the Whipple Mountains Wilderness Area are owned by the State of California or private land owners. Access to these areas is not by the BLM, but the other owners and agencies.

== Whipple Mountains Wilderness Area ==
The majority of the Whipple Range lies within the Whipple Mountains Wilderness, administered by the Needles Field office of the United States Bureau of Land Management. The wilderness covers approximately 76,122 acres (30,805 ha) of the range.

== See also ==
- List of Sonoran Desert wildflowers
