= Arrastra Mountain Wilderness =

Protected wilderness area in Arizona, United States

- IUCN category Ib (wilderness area)
- Location within Arizona
- Location: Mohave County, Yavapai County, and La Paz County, Arizona, United States
- Nearest town: Wikieup, Arizona
- Coordinates: 34°28′49″N 113°15′51″W
- Area: 129,800 acres (525 km^{2})
- Established: 1990
- Governing body: U.S. Department of the Interior Bureau of Land Management

Arrastra Mountain Wilderness is a protected wilderness area centered around the Poachie Range, a northwest–southeast trending mountain range that rises to almost 5,000 feet (1,500 m). Established in 1990 under the Arizona Desert Wilderness Act, the area is managed by the Bureau of Land Management Colorado River District.

Within the eastern section of the range there is the pristine Peoples Canyon. Several springs here maintain a 2-mile-long (3.2 km) chain of deep, interconnecting pools densely shaded by hundreds of sycamores, willows, and cottonwoods. The southern edge of the mountains are broken up by several isolated volcanic plugs and numerous drainages, several of which have been deeply incised into a bright orange mudstone.

Besides the Poachie range, the wilderness also encompasses more than 20 miles (32 km) of the ephemeral Big Sandy and Santa Maria Rivers. To the west of the Big Sandy, the Artillery Mountains are dominated by the striking red Artillery Peak, a 1,200-foot-tall (370 m) volcanic plug.

Some lands in and around the wilderness are private and not federally administered.
