= Parker Dam, California =

Unincorporated community in California, United States

- Unincorporated community
- Location within California
- Coordinates: 34°17′14″N 114°08′35″W
- Country: United States
- State: California
- County: San Bernardino
- Elevation: 397 ft (121 m)
- Time zone: UTC-8 (Pacific (PST))
  - Summer (DST): UTC-7 (PDT)
- ZIP code: 92267
- Area codes: 442/760
- GNIS feature ID: 1656594

Parker Dam is an unincorporated community in San Bernardino County, California, United States. Parker Dam is located along the Colorado River across from Arizona 24 miles (39 km) east-northeast of Vidal. It is named after Parker Dam, which impounds the Colorado River nearby. Parker Dam has a post office with ZIP code 92267. The post office opened in 1935 and closed briefly between 1939 and 1940.

Parker Dam is traversed by Parker Dam Road, a Bureau of Land Management Back Country Byway. Along the road are multiple BLM-operated campsites and facilities, as well as multiple privately-operated campsites.
