= Cofer Hot Springs =

Arizona hot springs

- Location within Arizona
- Interactive map of Cofer Hot Springs
- Location: Wikieup, Arizona
- Coordinates: 34°41′44″N 113°34′26″W
- Elevation: 632 ft (193 m)

Cofer Hot Springs (Paipai: Ha’ Kamwe’) are privately owned hot springs in Arizona, United States.

== Description ==
The springs discharge 290 acre-feet of water per year.

The springs are known as Ha’ Kamwe’ in Paipai language by the Hualapai Native American tribe who consider them sacred. The tribe occupy the Cholla Canyon Ranch near Wikieup, Arizona from where they visit the springs.

In 2021, the American Institute for Economic Research stated that the planned development of the Big Sandy lithium mine would destroy the springs.

== See also ==
- List of hot springs in the United States
