= The Boy in the Box (Vidal, California) =

1969 criminal case in California, United States

The "Boy in the Box" trial was held at the Riverside County Superior Court in Indio, California in 1969 and 1970. It was, at that time, portrayed as a case of severe child endangerment.

== Investigation and arrest ==
Charges were filed against 13 members of the Solar Lodge secret society after their ranch near Vidal was raided by deputies of the Riverside County Sheriff's Department on July 26, 1969. When the deputy sheriffs arrived at Solar Ranch, they found 6-year-old Anthony Saul Gibbons sitting inside a six-foot by six-foot box with a chain padlocked to his left leg and attached to a heavy metal plate.

It was alleged that between May 31 and July 26, 1969, the boy was kept chained up in the box and left exposed to the heat of the Sonoran Desert. He was not allowed to leave the box during those 56 days.

However, the doctor who immediately examined the child testified that he was "a normal six-year-old boy, perhaps a bit dirty, but not suffering from malnutrition or dehydration." This statement is not consistent with the general accusations of prolonged confinement over many days.

The police arrested 13 members at the Vidal compound. Four were convicted of a felony, receiving six months in jail, five were convicted of a misdemeanor, receiving three months in jail, and four had their charges dismissed at the Indio branch of the Riverside County Superior Court.

Jean Brayton, her husband, the boy's father, and three other members left California before they could be arrested, going on the run from the authorities. Three years later they all surrendered in court, but none were forced to serve a sentence in jail because it was determined that the circumstances surrounding their charges were subject to entrapment laws. Jean Brayton pleaded guilty and was sentenced to three years probation and a $500 fine. Her husband, Richard Brayton, had his charges dismissed. Frater Dys, who had actually chained the boy for no more than 10 hours, pleaded guilty and received probation. Other members had their charges dismissed due to lack of evidence.

== Sources ==
- "Six-year-old boy held prisoner in packing crate". The Bulletin. UPI. July 29, 1969. p. 7.
- Washington Post, 31 October 1969, "Boy Tells Of Chaining By Cultists"
- Memorandum to Director of the FBI, dated 15 August 1969 from the Special Agent In Charge of the Los Angeles FBI regarding the request of the Riverside County District Attorney's Office for Unlawful Flight to Avoid Prosecution assistance.
- Mystic-History website: The True History of Solar Lodge
