= Signal, Arizona =

Ghost town in Mohave County, Arizona

- Ghost town
- Location within Arizona Location within the United States
- Coordinates: 34°28′27″N 113°38′02″W
- Country: United States
- State: Arizona
- County: Mohave
- Established: circa 1876
- Abandoned: circa 1932
- Elevation: 1,342 ft (409 m)
- Time zone: UTC-7 (MST (no DST))
- Post Office Opened: October 15, 1877
- Post Office Closed: May 14, 1932

Signal is a ghost town located on the banks of the Big Sandy River in southern Mohave County, Arizona, United States. The town was a mining center from the 1870s to 1930s. The peak population was around 800. Remnants of the town can still be seen today along with nearby Virginia City.

== History ==
Signal came into existence because of silver and gold mining in the area. In 1874 the McCracken mines opened up and Signal grew up a couple years later in 1876 to 1877. During its time, the town had mills for local mines and the nearby McCracken mines. A major problem for Signal was getting freight to the isolated location. Shop owners had to make their orders 6 months in advance. At the town's heyday it had 5 stores, 3 restaurants, and 13 saloons and its own brewery. The town was mostly abandoned by 1932, but a few ranches in the area continue to this day.

== Town ruins ==
Little remains of the original mines and mill still exist. Scattered ruins of mine equipment and adobe ruins of the town mark the site today. The ruins are well-preserved due to the remote location. An intact town cemetery also remains. There is a part-time caretaker of the town. The historical remnants of the town sit on Bureau of Land Management land. The area around Signal is not entirely uninhabited as there are several farms and houses nearby, and the unincorporated area of Signal is still listed as populated.

== Geography ==
The town is located about 16 miles off U.S. Route 93, approximately 60 miles (97 km) south of Kingman. The Big Sandy River runs to the east of the town site. The river runs mostly year-round at a trickle, but is sometimes impassible after a rain. Signal is at the northern end of Signal Wash. The Arrastra Mountain Wilderness is about three miles south of the town site. The Artillery Mountains run along the western side of the Big Sandy River to Alamo Lake, 12 miles (19 km) to the south.
