= Aubrey Peak (Hualapai Mountains) =

Mountain in Mohave County, Arizona

- Grooms Peak
- Location within Arizona

Highest point
- Elevation: 5,080 ft (1,548 m) NAVD 88
- Prominence: 858 ft (262 m)
- Coordinates: 34°39′47″N 113°43′45″W

Geography
- Location: Mohave County, Arizona, U.S.
- Parent range: Hualapai Mountains
- Topo map: USGS Aubrey Peak

Geology
- Rock age: 1.7–1.4 mya
- Mountain type(s): Granite, with feldspar

Climbing
- Easiest route: Hike (1 mile)

Aubrey Peak, also known as Grooms Peak, is a summit located 35 miles east-northeast of Lake Havasu City in Mohave County, Arizona and is in the Hualapai Mountains.

The peak can approached from the town of Wikieup on U.S. Route 93 by way of Chicken Springs Road which ascends to a saddle on the mountains southeast flank.

The Aubrey Peak is profiled in Hiking Arizona's Geology, as Hike 29, Aubrey Peak Road.
