= Parker Dam =

Colorado River dam between Arizona and California

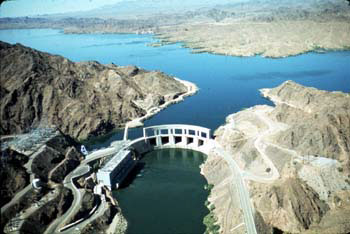

- Location within Arizona
- Location: San Bernardino County, California; La Paz County, Arizona
- Coordinates: 34°17′47″N 114°08′23″W
- Status: In use
- Construction began: 1934; 92 years ago
- Opening date: 1938; 88 years ago
- Owner: United States Bureau of Reclamation
- Operator: United States Bureau of Reclamation

Dam and spillways
- Type of dam: Concrete gravity-arch
- Impounds: Colorado River
- Height: 85 ft (26 m)
- Height (foundation): 320 ft (98 m)
- Length: 856 ft (261 m)
- Width (crest): 39 ft (12 m)
- Width (base): 100 ft (30 m)
- Spillway type: Service, controlled
- Spillway capacity: 400,000 cu ft/s (11,000 m^{3}/s)

Reservoir
- Creates: Lake Havasu
- Total capacity: 646,200 acre⋅ft (797,100,000 m^{3})
- Catchment area: 178,392 mi^{2} (462,030 km^{2})
- Surface area: 19,300 acres (7,800 ha)

Power Station
- Turbines: 4 x 30 MW Francis turbine
- Installed capacity: 120 MW
- Annual generation: 456.944 GWh
- Website www.usbr.gov/projects/index.php?id=207

Parker Dam is a concrete arch-gravity dam that crosses the Colorado River 155 miles (249 km) downstream of Hoover Dam. Built between 1934 and 1938 by the Bureau of Reclamation, it is 320 feet (98 m) high, 235 feet (72 m) of which are below the riverbed (the deep excavation was necessary in order to reach the bedrock on which the foundation of the dam was built), making it the deepest dam in the world. The portion of the dam above the foundation stands 85 feet (25.9 m) tall, making it the only dam in the world that stands more underground than above ground. The dam's primary functions are to create a reservoir, and to generate hydroelectric power. The reservoir behind the dam is called Lake Havasu and can store 647,000 acre⋅ft (798,000,000 m^{3}; 2.11×10^{11} US gal; 1.76×10^{11} imp gal). The dam straddles the Arizona-California state border where the river passes between the Whipple Mountains in San Bernardino County, California and the Buckskin Mountains in La Paz County, Arizona.

== Power generation ==
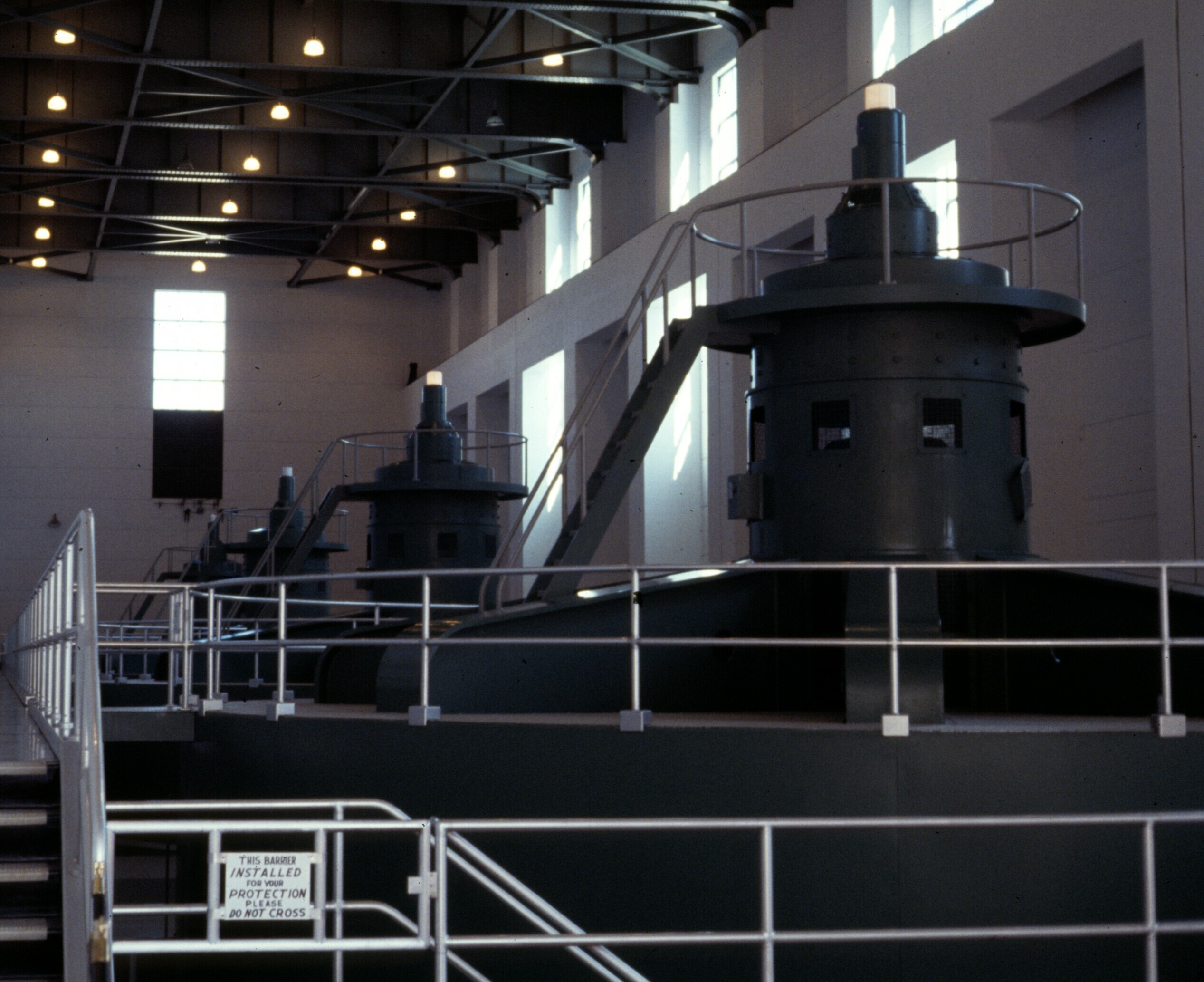
Turbine hall (1973 photo)

The power plant has four Francis turbines with a combined capacity of 120 MW. Each turbine weighs 60,000 pounds (27,000 kg). The head is 72 feet (21.9 m). It produces electricity at 97 percent efficiency. Half of the electricity the plant produces is used by the Metropolitan Water District to pump water along the Colorado River Aqueduct, and the rest is sold to utilities in California, Arizona and Nevada. The generation of power is limited by a requirement to keep the water level of Lake Havasu between 440 and 450 feet (134.1 and 137.2 meters) above sea level for proper operation of pumping plants for the Central Arizona Project and the Colorado River Aqueduct.

== Water supply ==
Lake Havasu is the water source for the Colorado River Aqueduct. The aqueduct is operated by the Metropolitan Water District of Southern California, which supplies water to almost all cities in the greater Los Angeles, San Bernardino, and San Diego areas. The district paid for nearly the entire cost of the dam, but it is owned and operated by the U.S. Bureau of Reclamation.

Lake Havasu is also the water source for the Central Arizona Project Aqueduct (CAP). The project is designed to provide water for irrigated agricultural areas, as well as municipal water for several Arizona communities, including the metropolitan areas of Phoenix and Tucson.

== Controversy ==
Construction of the dam was a contentious issue for Arizona. Built as part of the larger Colorado River Compact of 1922, several political groups, their members and privately owned utility companies in Arizona were not pleased with the plan in general and refused to sign it until 1944. Even then Arizona continued to dispute its water allotments until a 1963 Supreme Court decision settled the issue. The court has had to adjust its decree several times since, most recently in 2000. As recently as 2008 Arizona Senator John McCain called for a renegotiation of the plan.

In 1935, when Arizona Governor Benjamin Baker Moeur sent 6 members of the Arizona National Guard to observe the dam's construction, they reported back that there was construction activity on the Arizona side of the river. Arizona Attorney General Arthur La Prade concluded that the Metropolitan Water District had no right to build on Arizona's territory, which prompted Governor Moeur to send a larger National Guard force to halt construction. The troops were recalled when Secretary of the Interior Harold L. Ickes halted construction until the issue had been settled.

The Department of the Interior took Arizona to court over the issue hoping to end the state's interference. To the Department of the Interior's surprise, the Supreme Court sided with Arizona and dismissed the injunction. The court concluded that the dam had never been directly approved by Congress and that California was not entitled to build on Arizona's land without Arizona's consent. Arizona ultimately consented to the dam's construction in exchange for federal approval of the Gila River irrigation project.

== Gallery ==
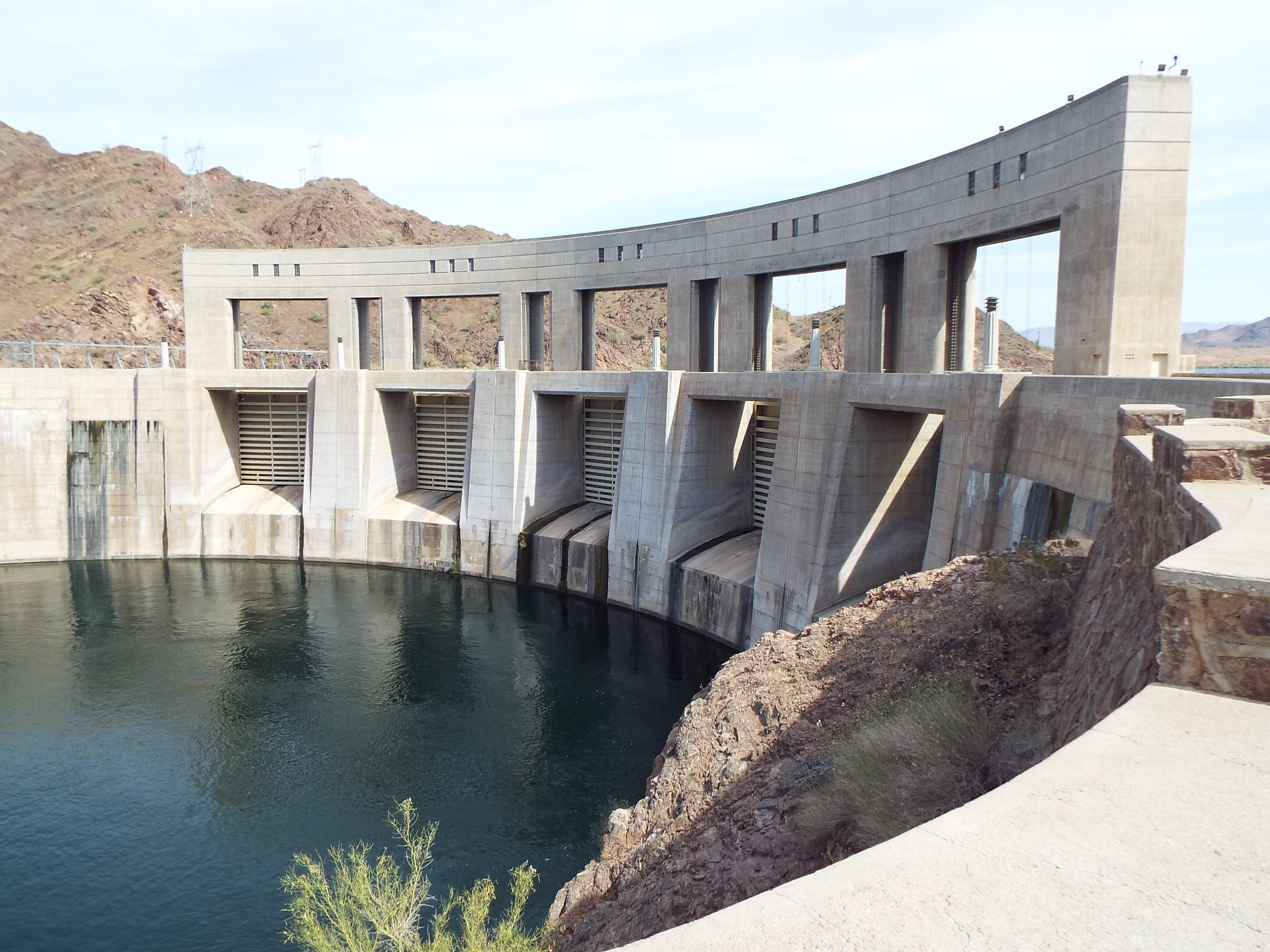
Parker Dam as viewed from Arizona.

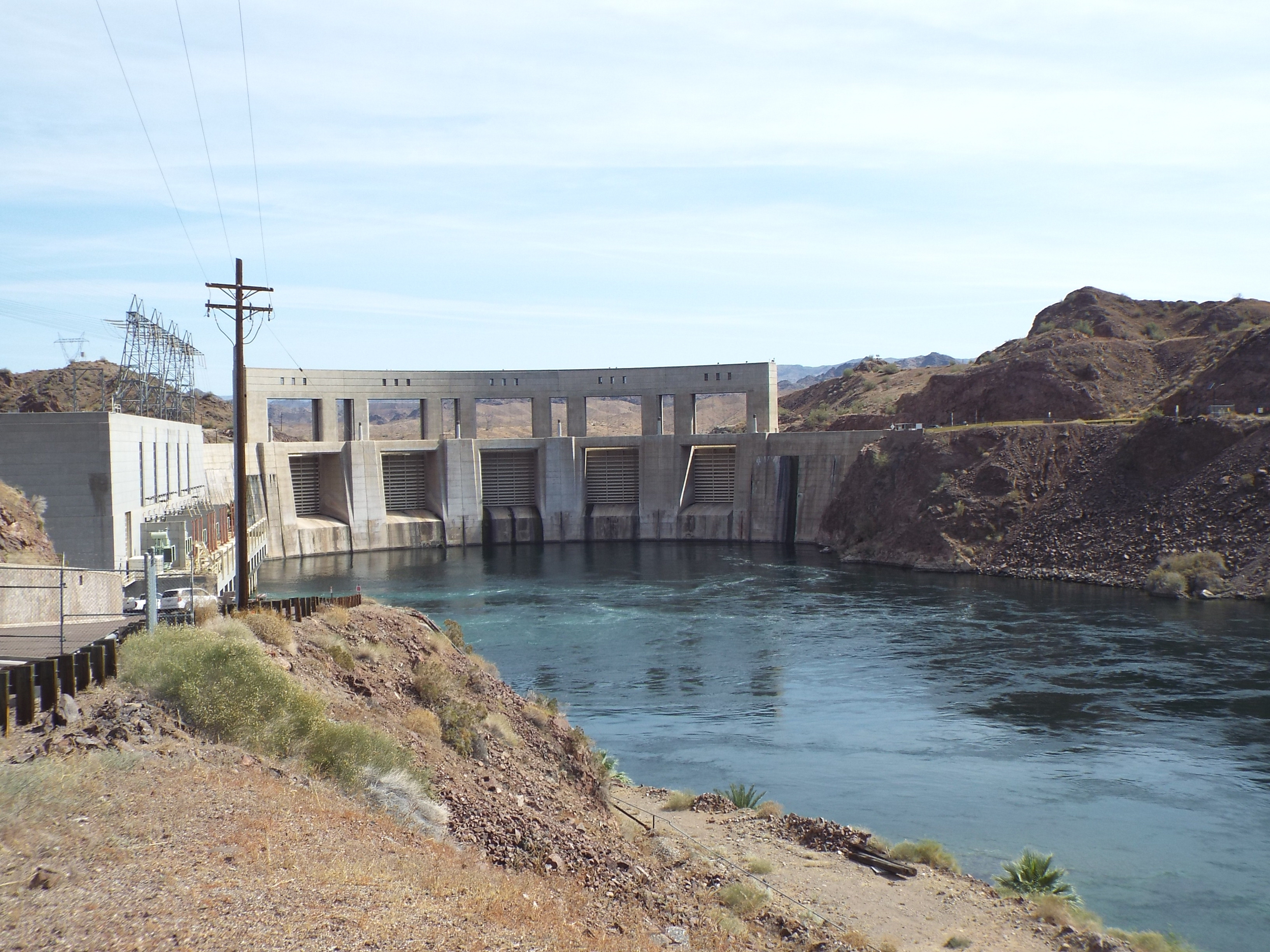
Parker Dam as viewed from California.

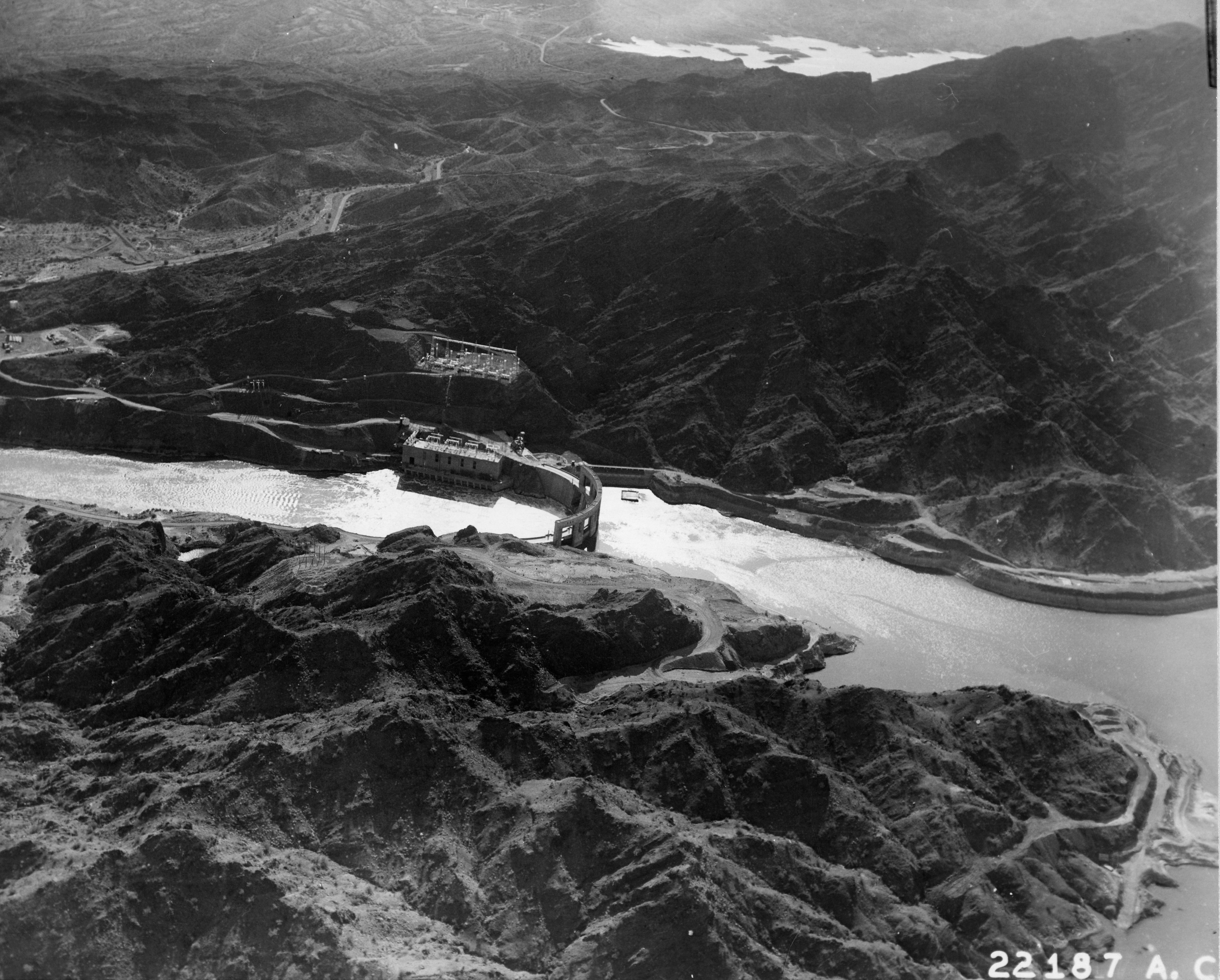
Parker Dam in the 1940s

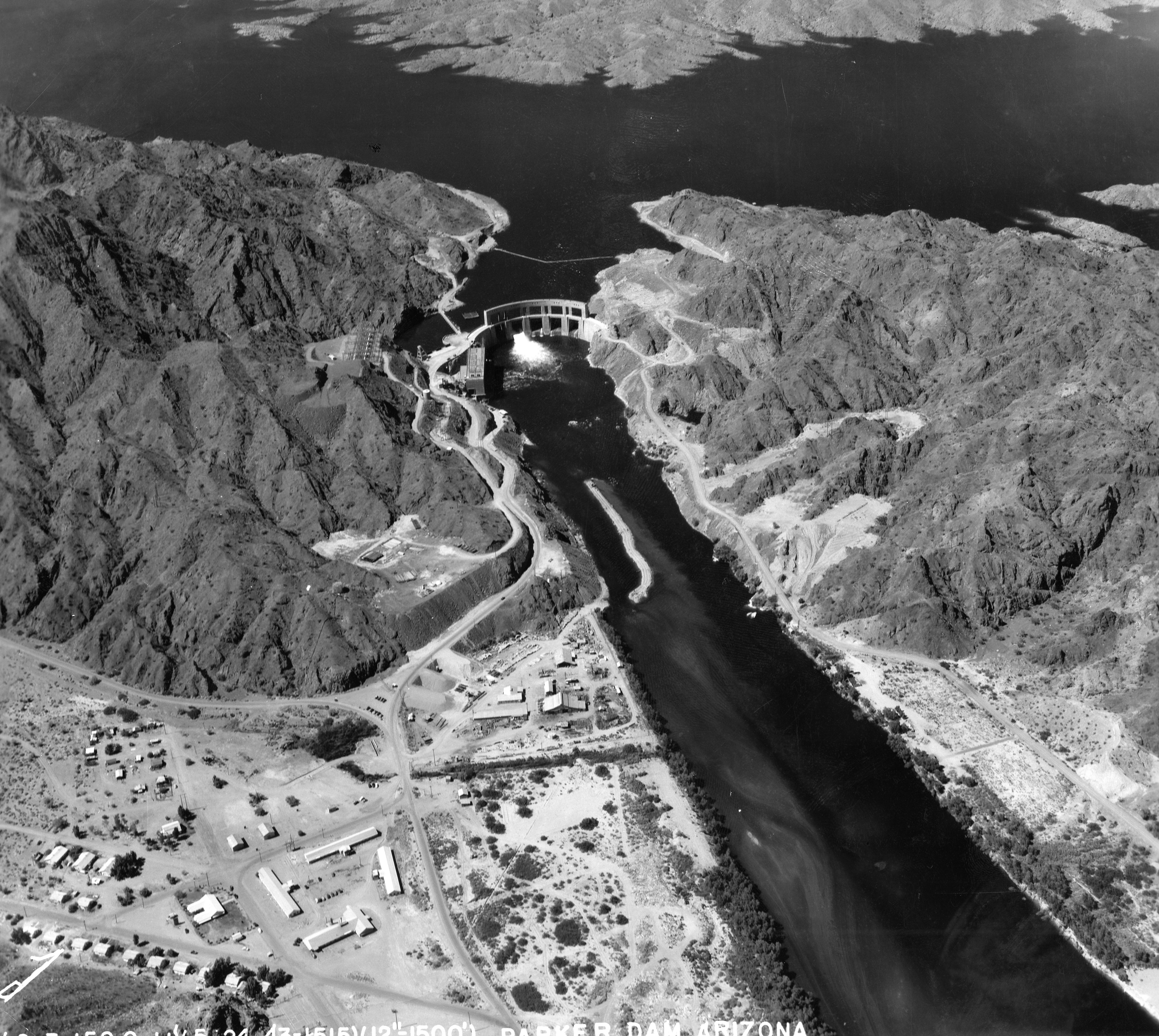
Parker Dam in the 1940s

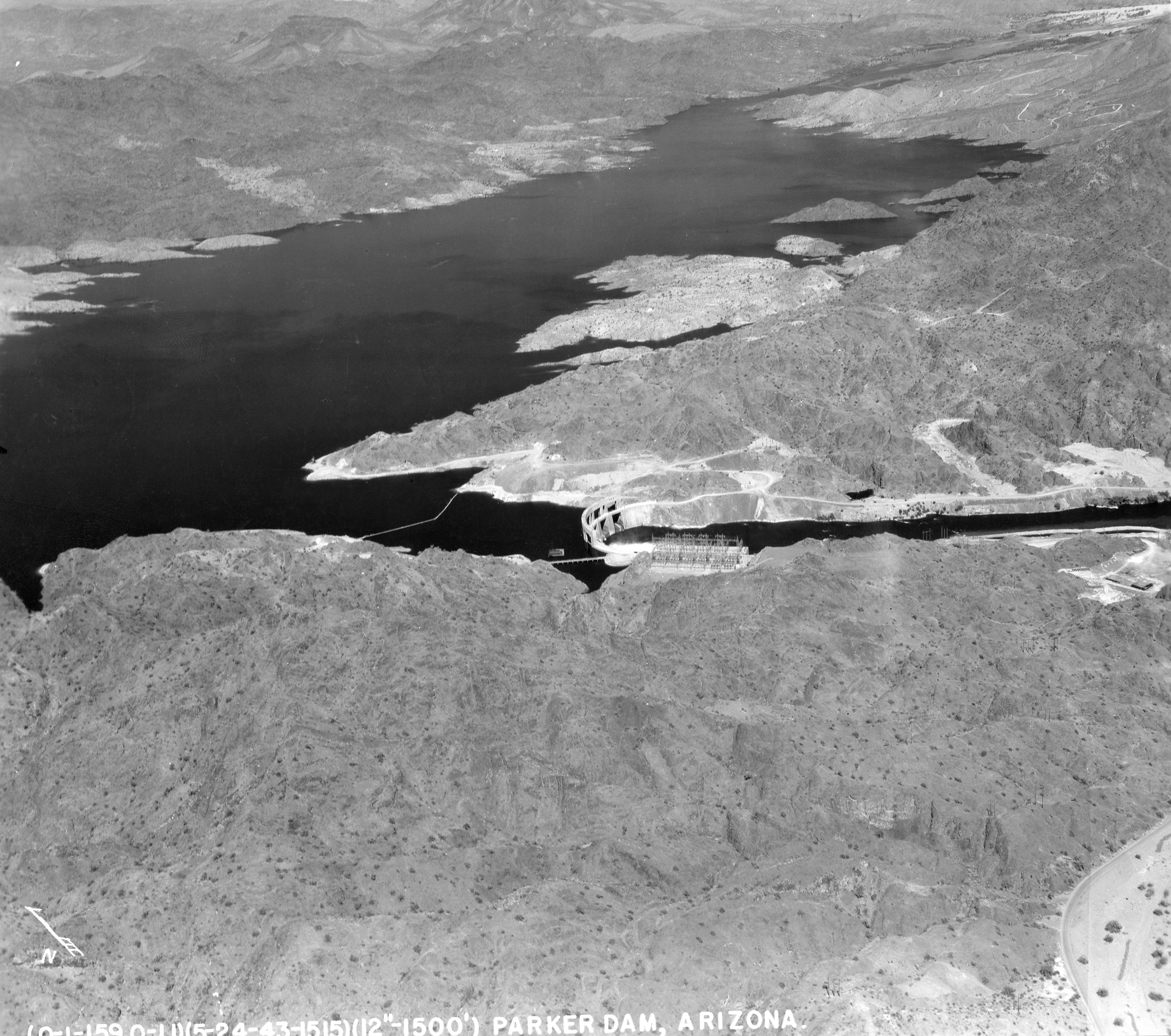
Parker Dam in the 1940s
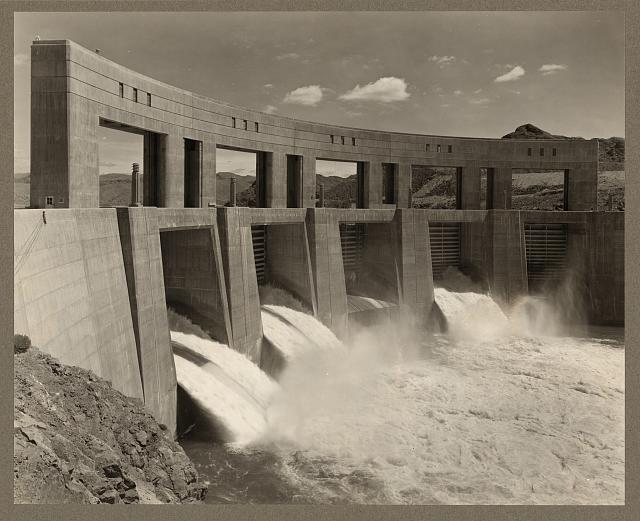
Parker Dam as viewed from California

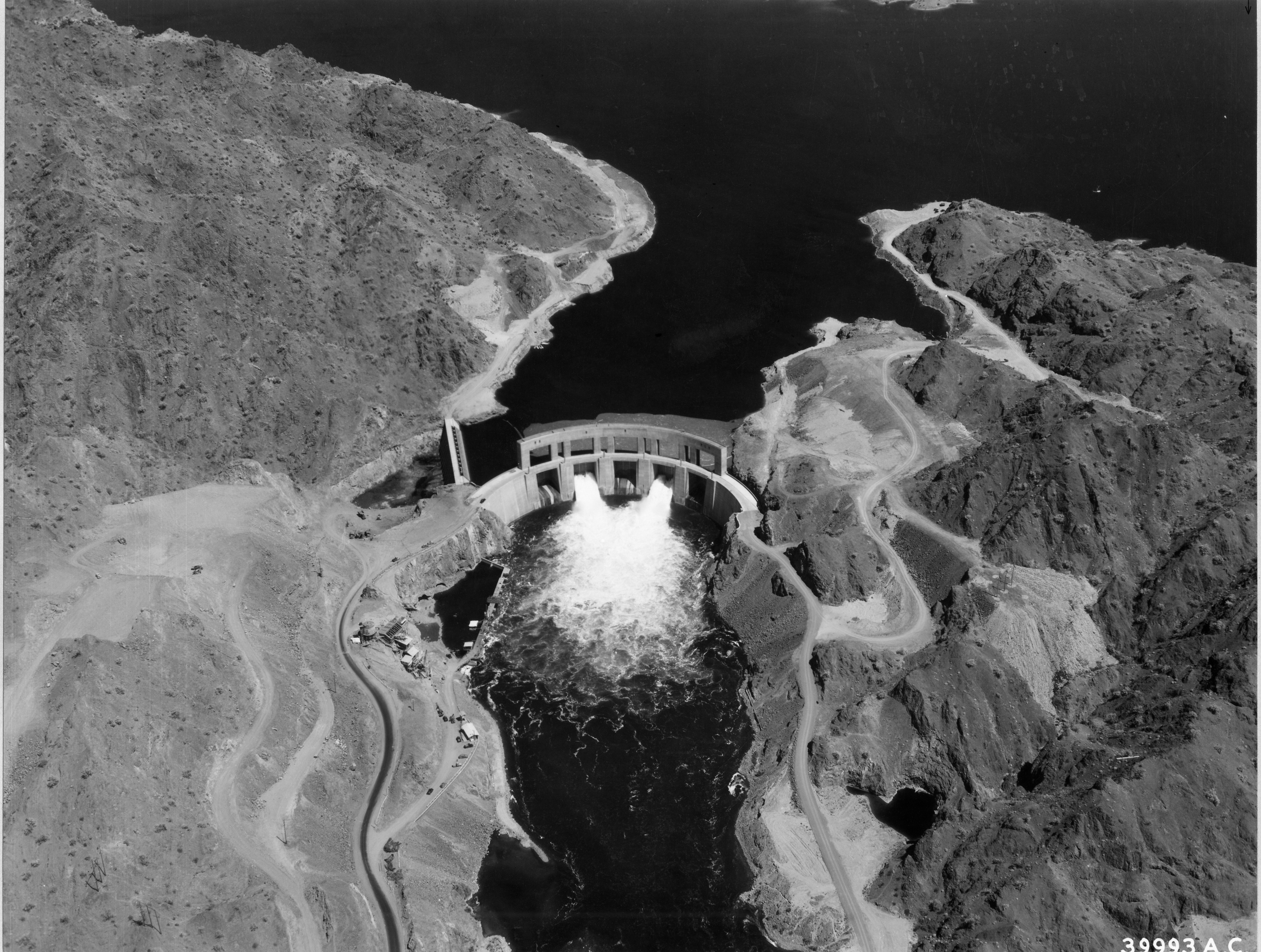
Parker Dam in the 1940s

== See also ==
- List of dams and reservoirs in California
- List of largest reservoirs of California
- List of power stations in California
- List of tallest dams in the United States
- List of United States Bureau of Reclamation dams
