= Vidal, California =

Unincorporated community in California, United States

- Unincorporated community
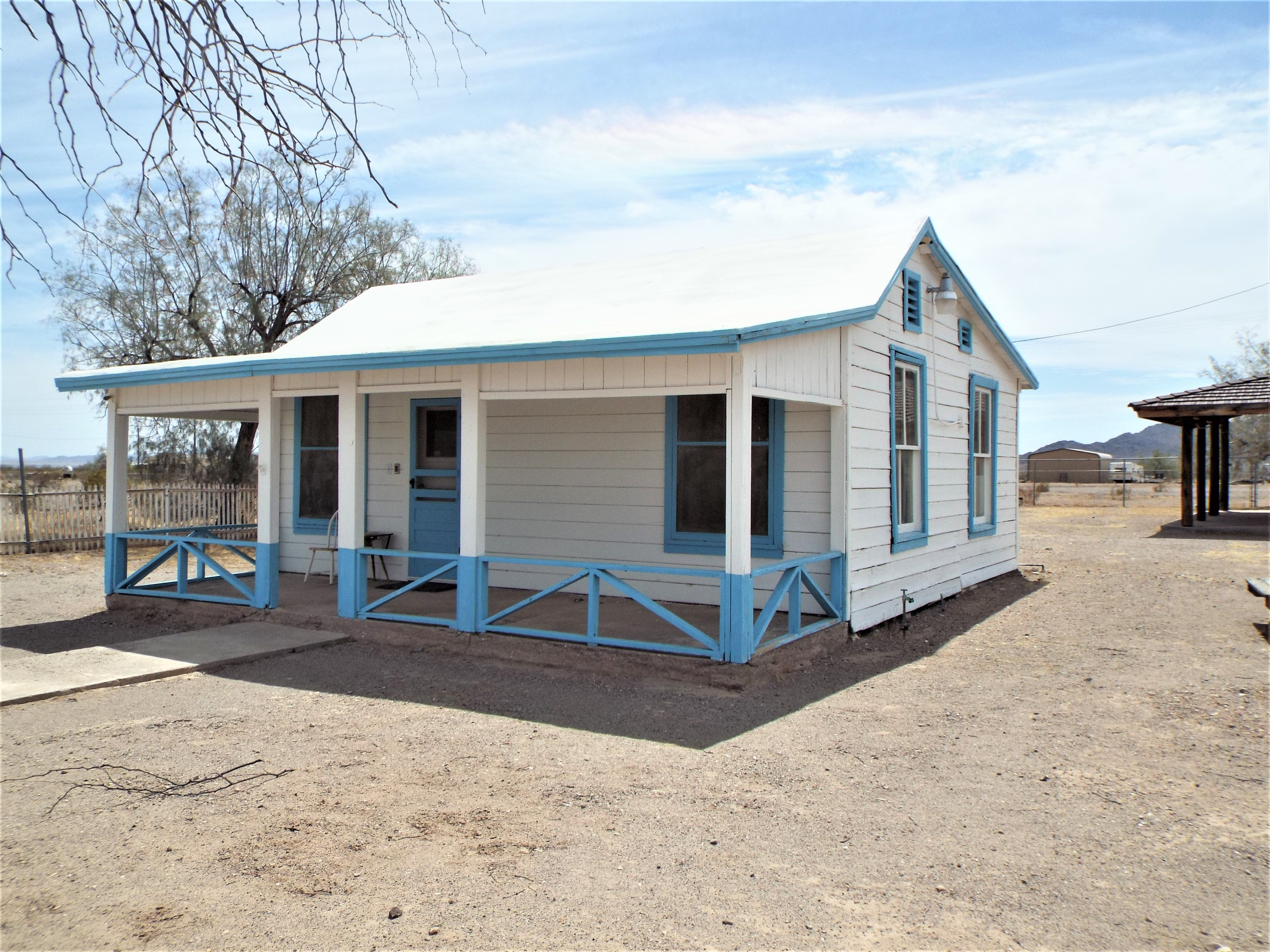
- The Wyatt Earp and Josephine Sarah Marcus Cottage

- Location within the state of California Vidal, California (the United States)
- Coordinates: 34°7′8″N 114°30′37″W
- Country: United States
- State: California
- County: San Bernardino
- Elevation: 627 ft (191 m)
- Time zone: UTC-8 (Pacific (PST))
  - Summer (DST): UTC-7 (PDT)
- ZIP codes: 92280
- Area codes: 442/760

Vidal, California is a small unincorporated community located in San Bernardino County, California on U.S. Route 95, 38 miles (61 km) north of Blythe, California, United States and 55 miles (89 km) south of Needles. The town is 22 miles (35 km) west of the townsite of Earp, California and 23 miles (37 km) west of Parker, Arizona on State Highway 62. The community, which is two miles (3 km) north of the Riverside County line, lies at an elevation of 812 feet (247 m) above sea level. Vidal is 221 miles (356 km) from the city (and county seat) of San Bernardino, making it the second-farthest town in the county from the county seat behind Earp. Wyatt Earp spent the last winters of his life in Vidal, working claims of gold and copper he found nearby; the aforementioned townsite of Earp is located in and around those claims.

During the late 1960s, Vidal was home to Solar Lodge, a secret society located four miles (6 km) south of the town center. The Lodge owned all of the businesses in the town during their time there, but left the area after several members were arrested for child abuse, in a case that became famous as "The Boy in the Box".

On February 5, 1979, a Santa Fe Railway train derailed 17 cars in the middle out of 74 cars two miles (3.2 km) west of Vidal. According to the railroad, five tankers ruptured. The spillage of residual fuel oil was disposed of through burning, and the railroad intended to send pumps to the site.

The ZIP code for both Vidal and nearby Vidal Junction is 92280 and the area codes 442 and 760.

== Weather ==
Average temperatures in Vidal range in January from 41 °F (5 °C) to 67 °F (19 °C), and July average temperatures range from 78 °F (26 °C) to a high of 108 °F (42 °C). The highest temperature ever recorded in Vidal was in 1905, when the temperature reached 127 °F (53 °C). The lowest recorded temperature was in 1911, when a low of 9 °F (−13 °C) was recorded.

The part of the Sonoran Desert where Vidal is located receives very little rainfall in a normal year. On average, Vidal Junction receives just 5.17 inches (131 mm) of precipitation per year, with July and January averaging just 0.27 and 0.87 inches (22 mm), respectively.

== Structures in Vidal ==
These are images of the structures in the ghost town of Vidal.

Structures in Vidal

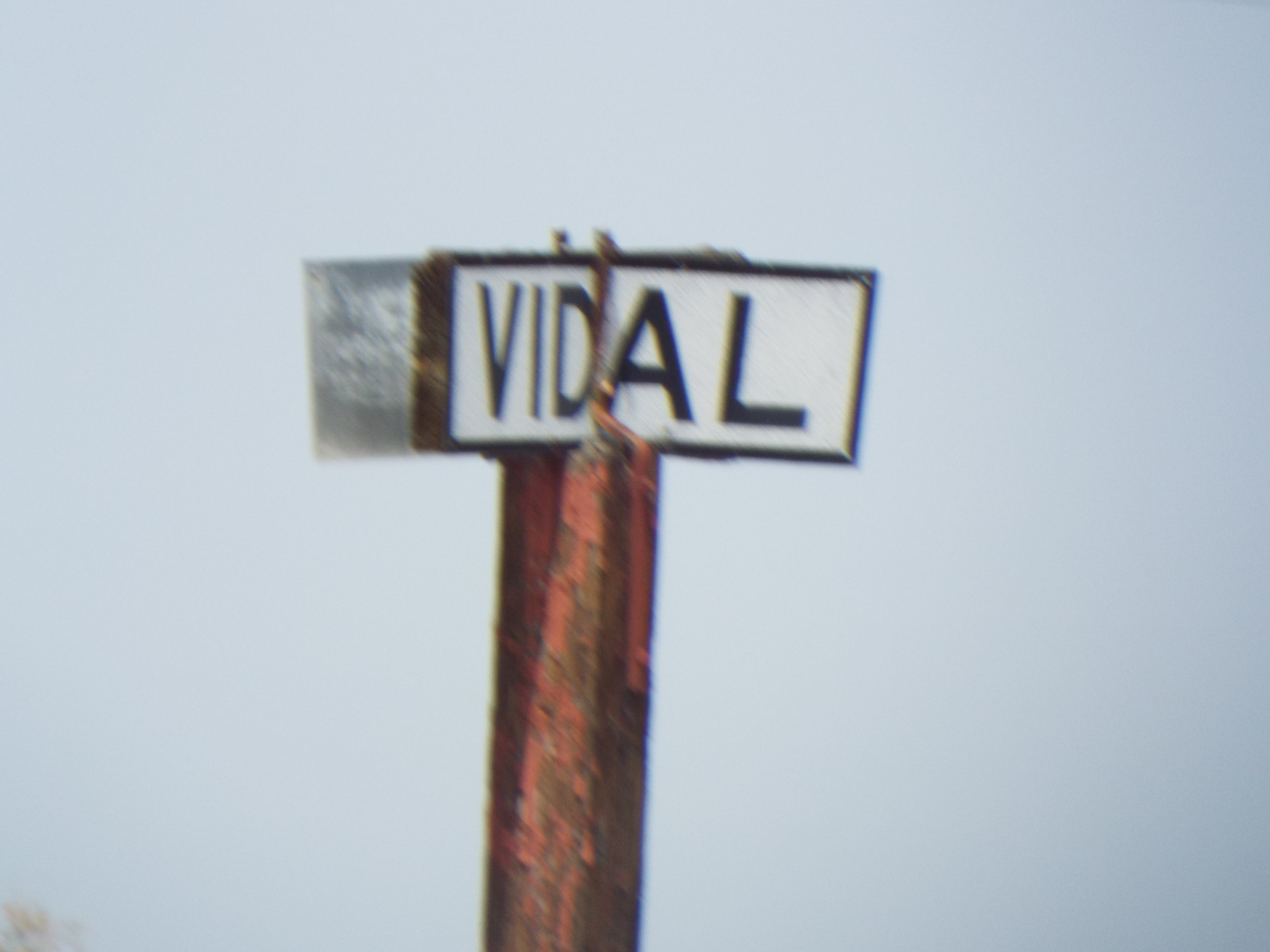
Vidal

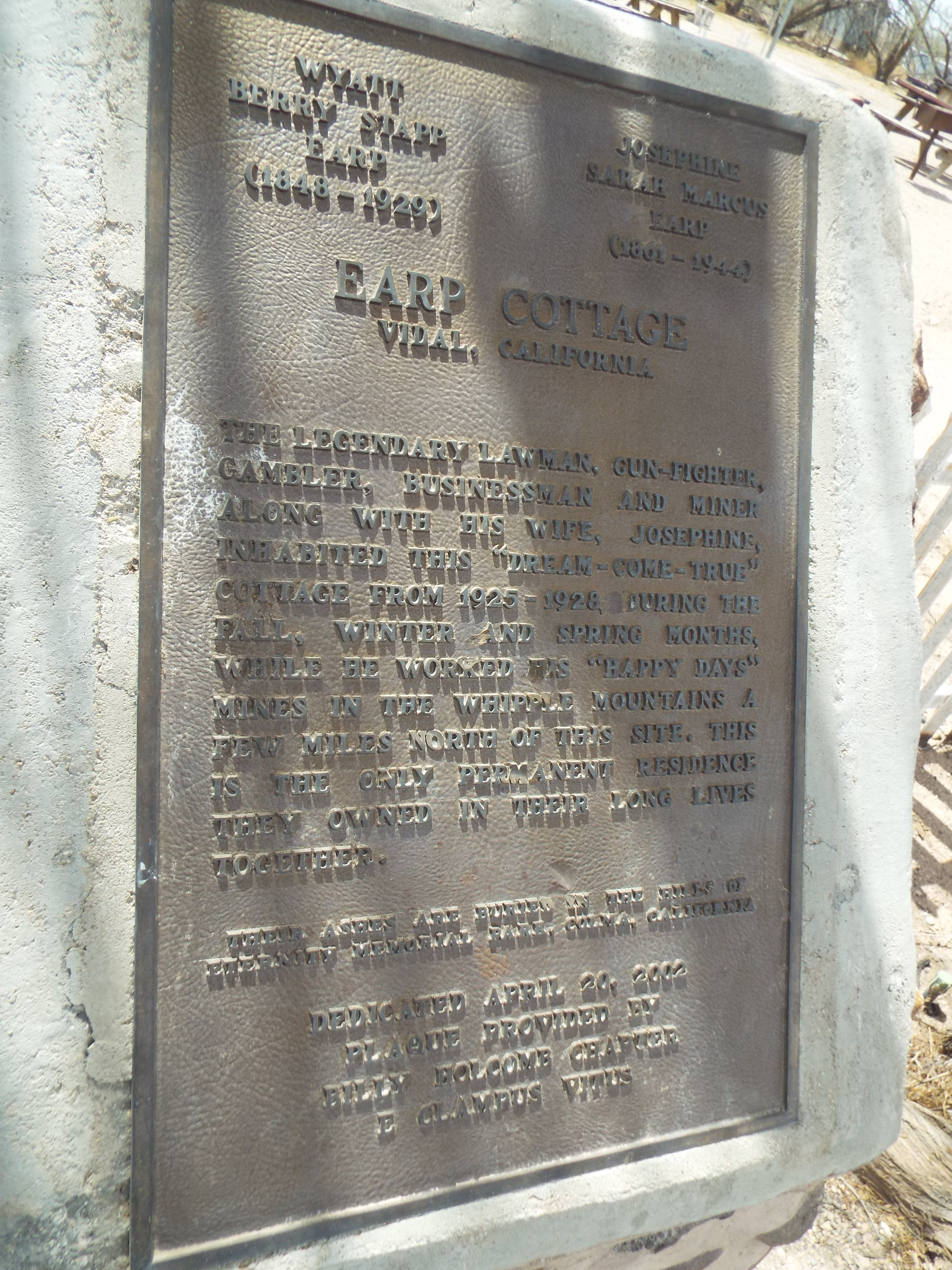
Wyatt Earp and Josephine Sarah Marcus Cottage Marker

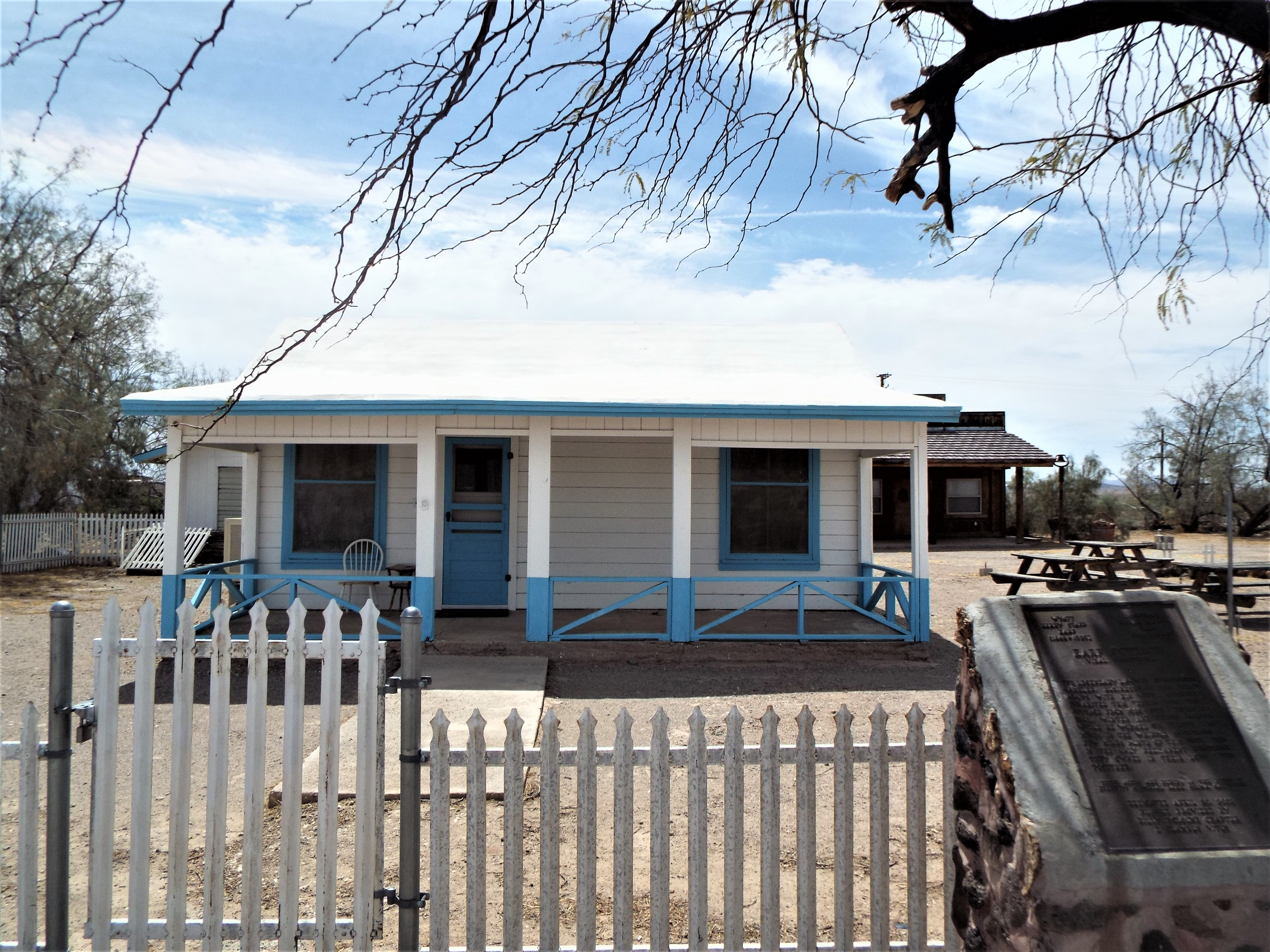
Wyatt Earp and Josephine Sarah Marcus Cottage

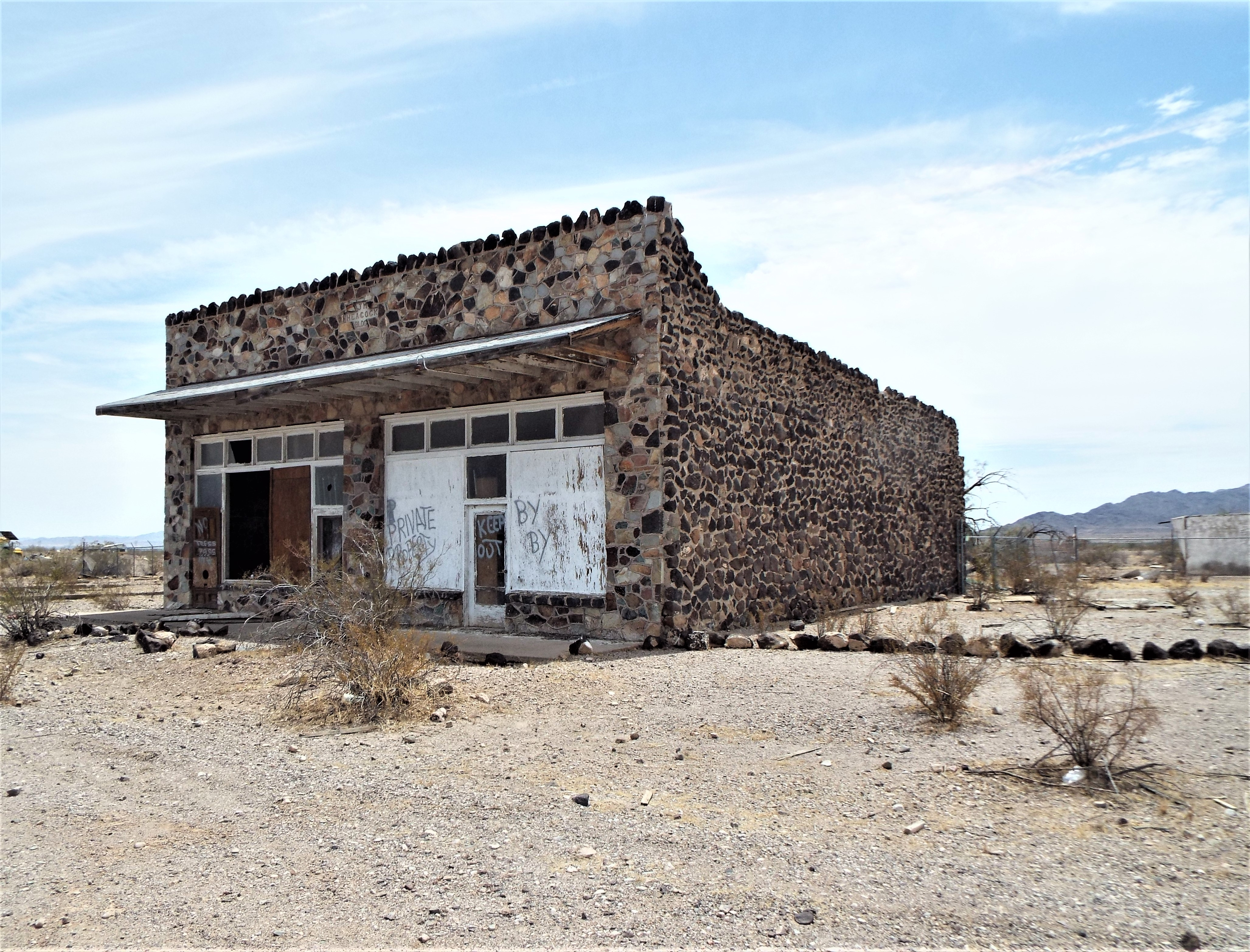
Abandoned J. M. Hencock Building

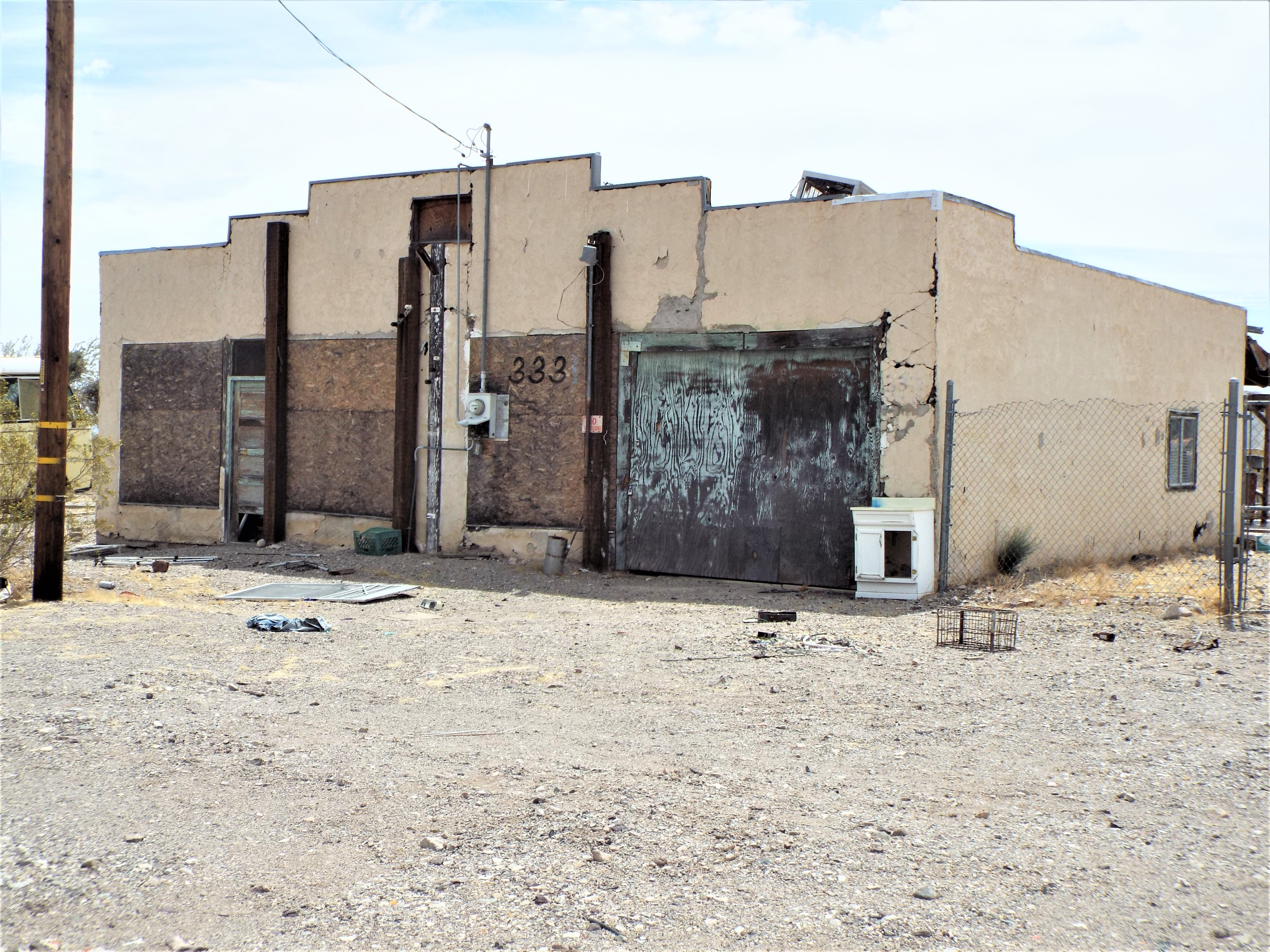
Abandoned Charles Bunnell's General Store

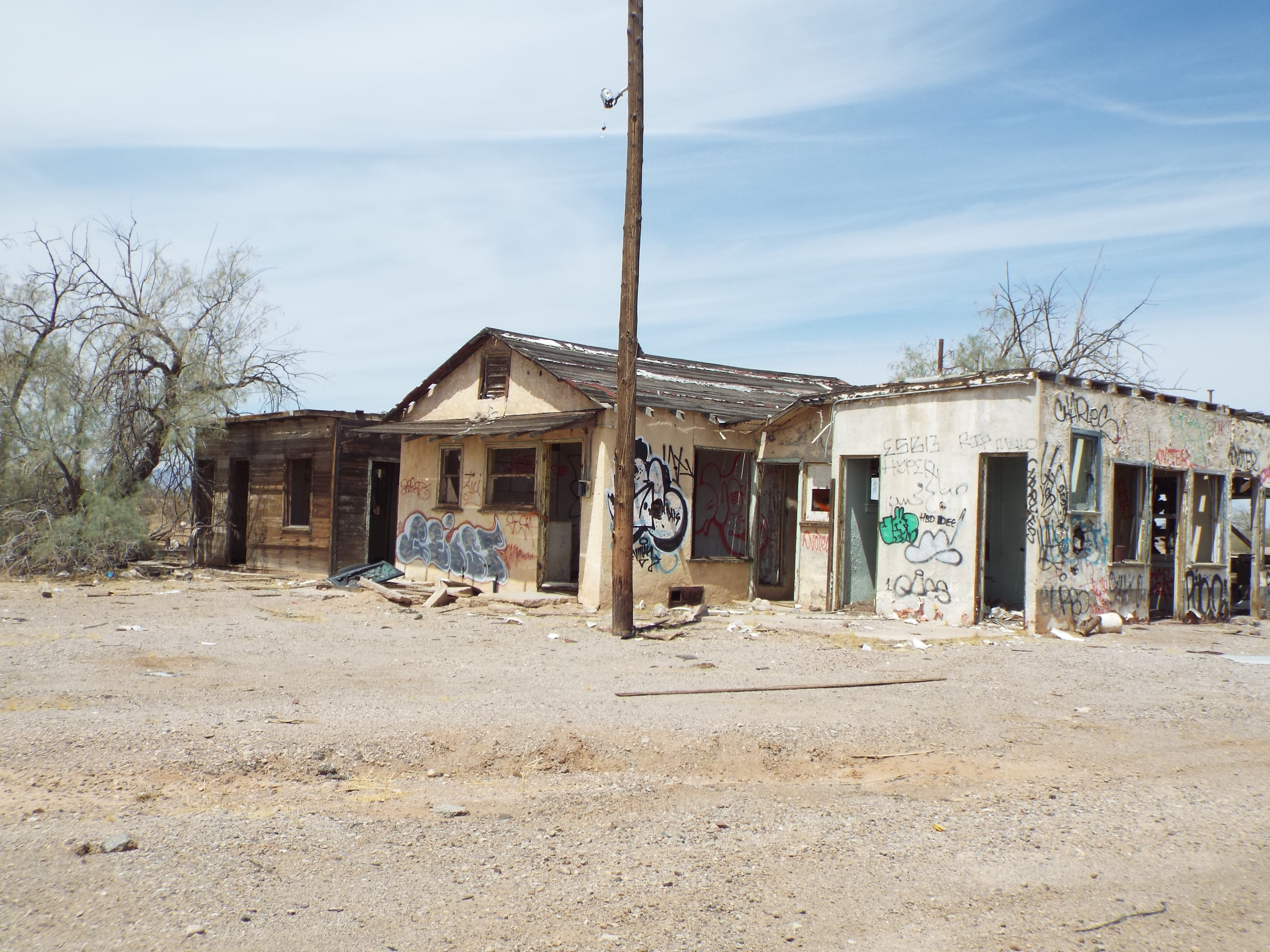
Abandoned Gas Station and stores

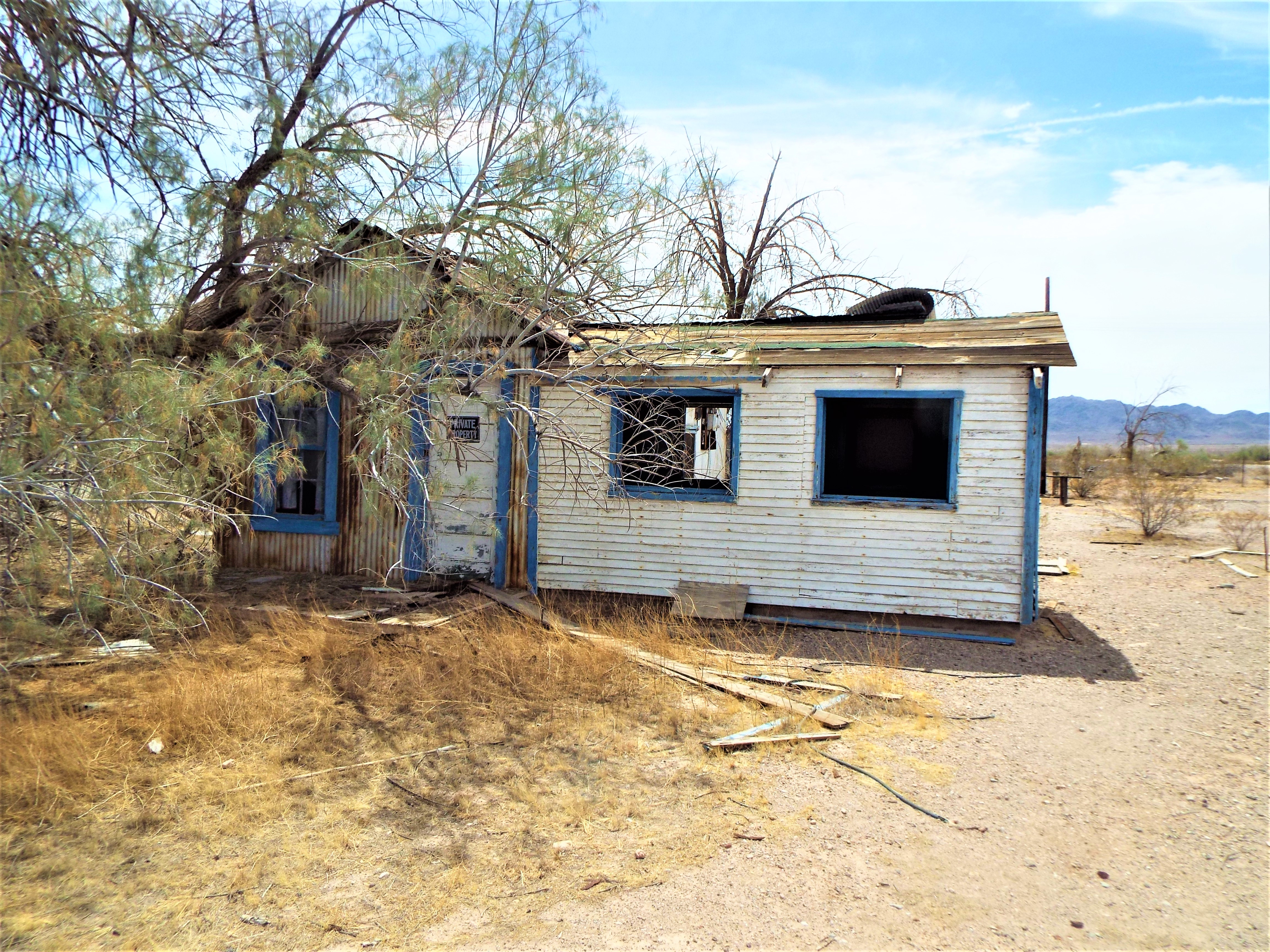
Abandoned House

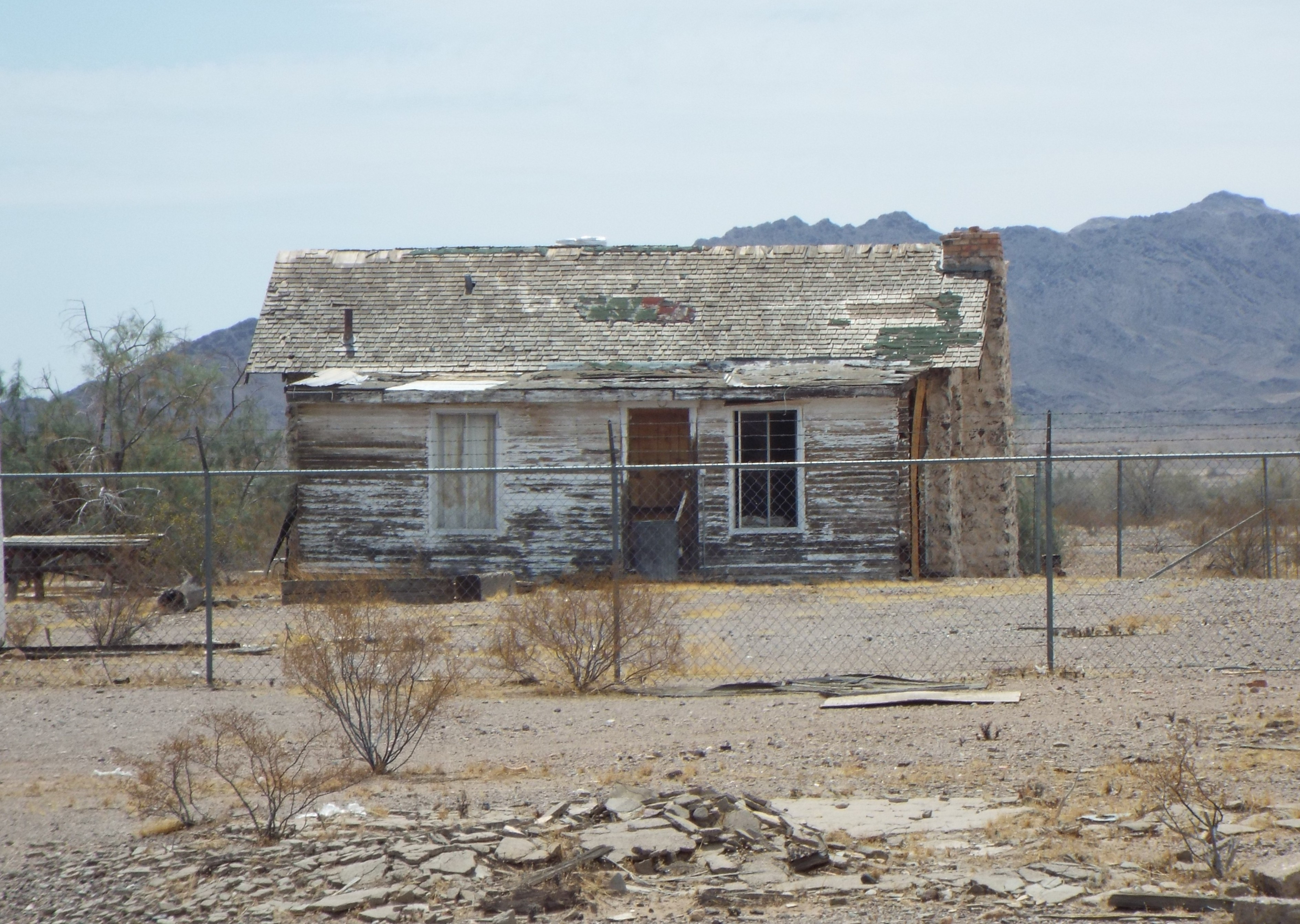
Abandoned House

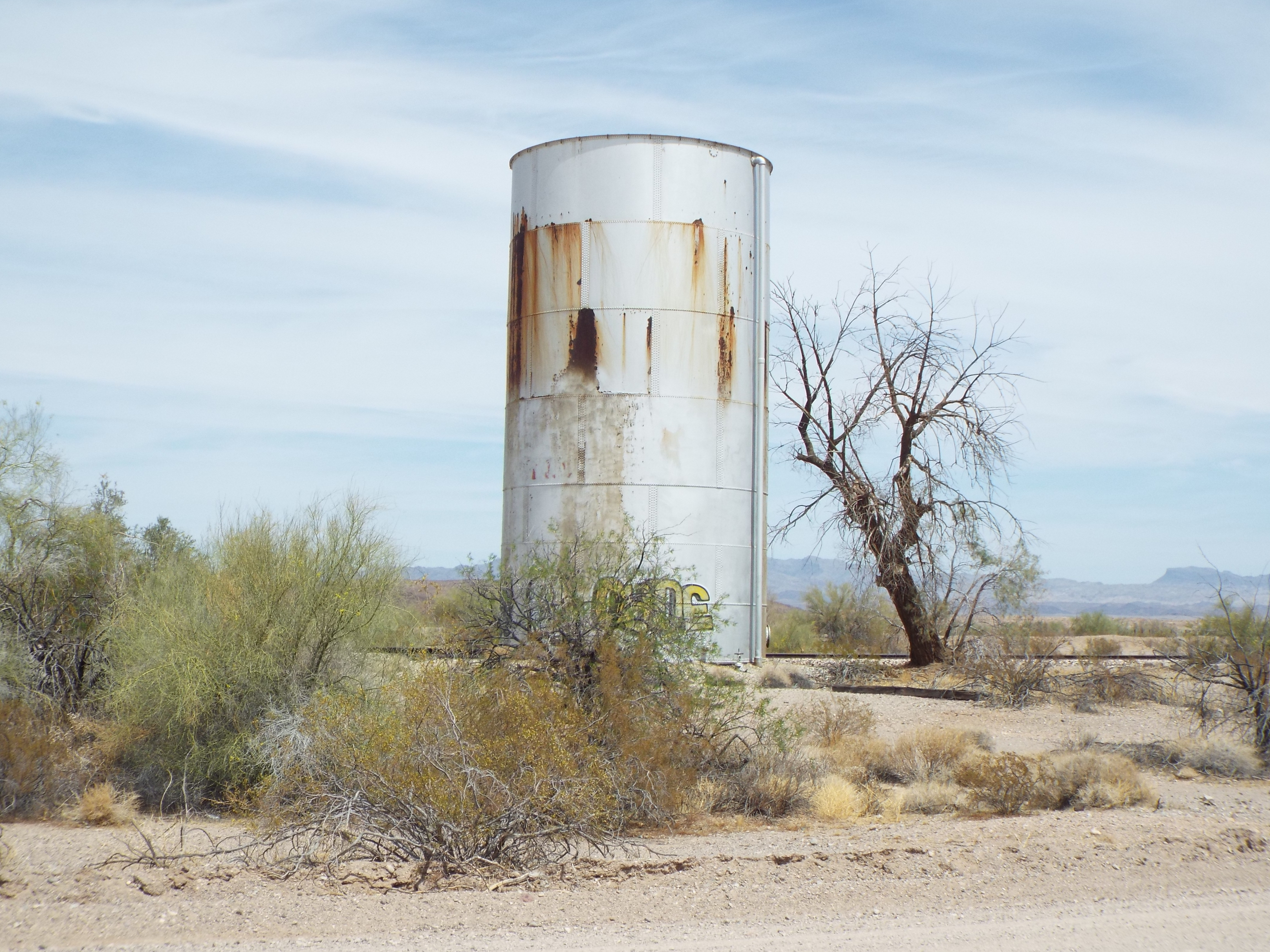
Steam Train Water Tower
