= Big Sandy River (Arizona) =

River in Arizona

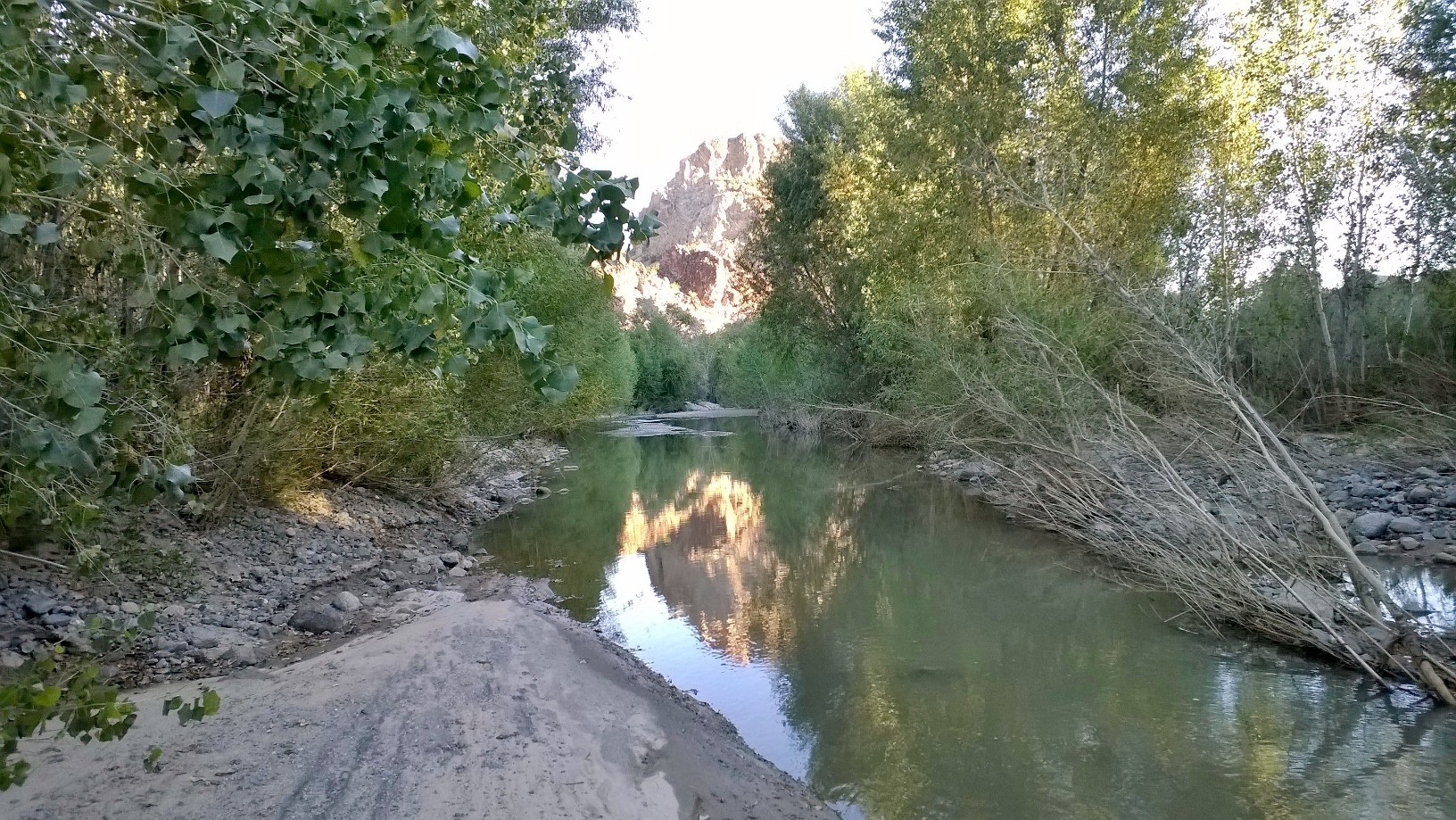
- Big Sandy River in the Arrastra Mountain Wilderness

- Location of the mouth of the Big Sandy River

Location
- Country: United States
- State: Arizona
- County: Mohave, La Paz

Physical characteristics
- Source: Between Hualapai and Aquarius ranges
  - location: East of U.S. Route 93 near Hualapai Indian Reservation, Mohave County
  - coordinates: 34°55′21″N 113°37′37″W
  - elevation: 2,435 ft (742 m)
- Mouth: Bill Williams River
  - location: Alamo Lake State Park, La Paz County
  - coordinates: 34°18′38″N 113°31′36″W
  - elevation: 1,237 ft (377 m)
- Length: 55.7 mi (89.6 km)
- Basin size: 1,988 sq mi (5,150 km^{2})
- Discharge
  - minimum: 0 cu ft/s (0 m^{3}/s)

The Big Sandy River is both an intermittent and perennial stream in Mohave and La Paz counties in northwestern Arizona in the United States. It begins where Cottonwood Wash and Trout Creek converge in the Hualapai Indian Reservation east of U.S. Route 93 then flows past Wikieup south of Kingman. The Big Sandy River then passes the Signal Ghost Town Site, meanders through the Arrastra Mountain Wilderness, and joins the Santa Maria River in Southern Mohave County to form the Bill Williams River. The Bill Williams River then empties into Alamo Lake State Park. The Big Sandy River is 55.7 miles (89.6 km) long.

The Big Sandy drainage basin covers approximately 2,000 square miles (5,200 km^{2}) in Mohave, La Paz, and Yavapai counties. The Hualapai Mountains are west of the river, and the Aquarius and Mohon Mountains lie to the east and southeast, the Juniper Mountains further east, and the Peacock Mountains and Cottonwood Mountains to the north. Hualapai Peak at 8,417 feet (2,566 m) is the highest point in the basin. The river flows through the Arrastra Mountain Wilderness.

== Water flow ==
The Big Sandy River flows year-round (perennial flow) south of the Signal Ghost Town site and intermittently above this site. In the period of 2007–2016, the surface water flow of the Big Sandy at the USGS monitoring site at the Signal Ghost Town ranged from a minimum of 22 US gallons (83 L) per second to a maximum output of nearly 524,000 US gallons (1,980,000 L) per second during flooding in early 2010.

Except for the northeastern part of the basin, aquifers supply a median well flow of 300 US gallons (1,100 L) per minute and up to 2,000 US gallons (7,600 L) per minute at Cane Springs, along Route 93 north of Wikieup. The largest spring in the Bill Williams River watershed is south of Cane Springs in the Big Sandy watershed; it discharges at 1,600 US gallons (6,100 L) per minute. Much of the water pumped from the basin is used in mining operations in the Bill Williams area. The Big Sandy basin, as of 2000, had a population of 1,142 people.

== Wildlife ==
The Big Sandy River basin is home to numerous animals and plants endemic to the region. An endangered bird, the southwestern willow flycatcher, resides in the basin, which has one of the few riparian areas remaining in Arizona. Wild Burros, a protected species, live in the river valley along with ring-tailed cats, mountain lions, coyote, and elk. Plant species include sycamores, willows, and cottonwoods.

== Water rights disputes ==
In 2001, the Line Siting Committee of the Arizona Corporation Commission voted 8–1 to deny a request to build a power plant in the basin, on grounds of environmental incompatibility. The proposed plant, fueled by natural gas, would have required 2,400 to 2,500 US gallons (9,100 to 9,500 L) of water a minute to cool its steam turbines.

In April 2015, the US Department of the Interior and Byner Cattle Co., a subsidiary of Freeport-McMoRan, proposed an agreement to transfer water rights from the Byner Cattle Co.'s Planet Ranch holdings on the Bill Williams River to the Big Sandy Basin pumping wells. According to the agreement, water will be pumped from Byner Cattle Co/Freeport wells to the mining town of Bagdad, Arizona in neighboring Yavapai County. Mohave County, which would lose water rights and tax revenue, filed an opposition to the agreement at the Arizona Department of Water Resources: "Mohave County, filed a letter of opposition with ADWR objecting to the Sever and Transfer Applications. ADWR has not taken final action on the Sever and Transfer Applications or the Objections."

The agreement allows Freeport to pump and divert an additional 10,055 acre-feet (343 million gallons) of water per year from the Big Sandy Basin. According to the Arizona Department of Water Resources, 96% of all pumped water from the Big Sandy Basin is used for mining purposes. The basin's average annual recharge is 22,000 acre-feet. The Hualapai Tribe, in exchange for their agreement to the water deal, received a $1 million donation for business development from Freeport.

== See also ==
- List of rivers of Arizona
