= Wikieup, Arizona =

Unincorporated community in the state of Arizona, United States

- Census-designated place
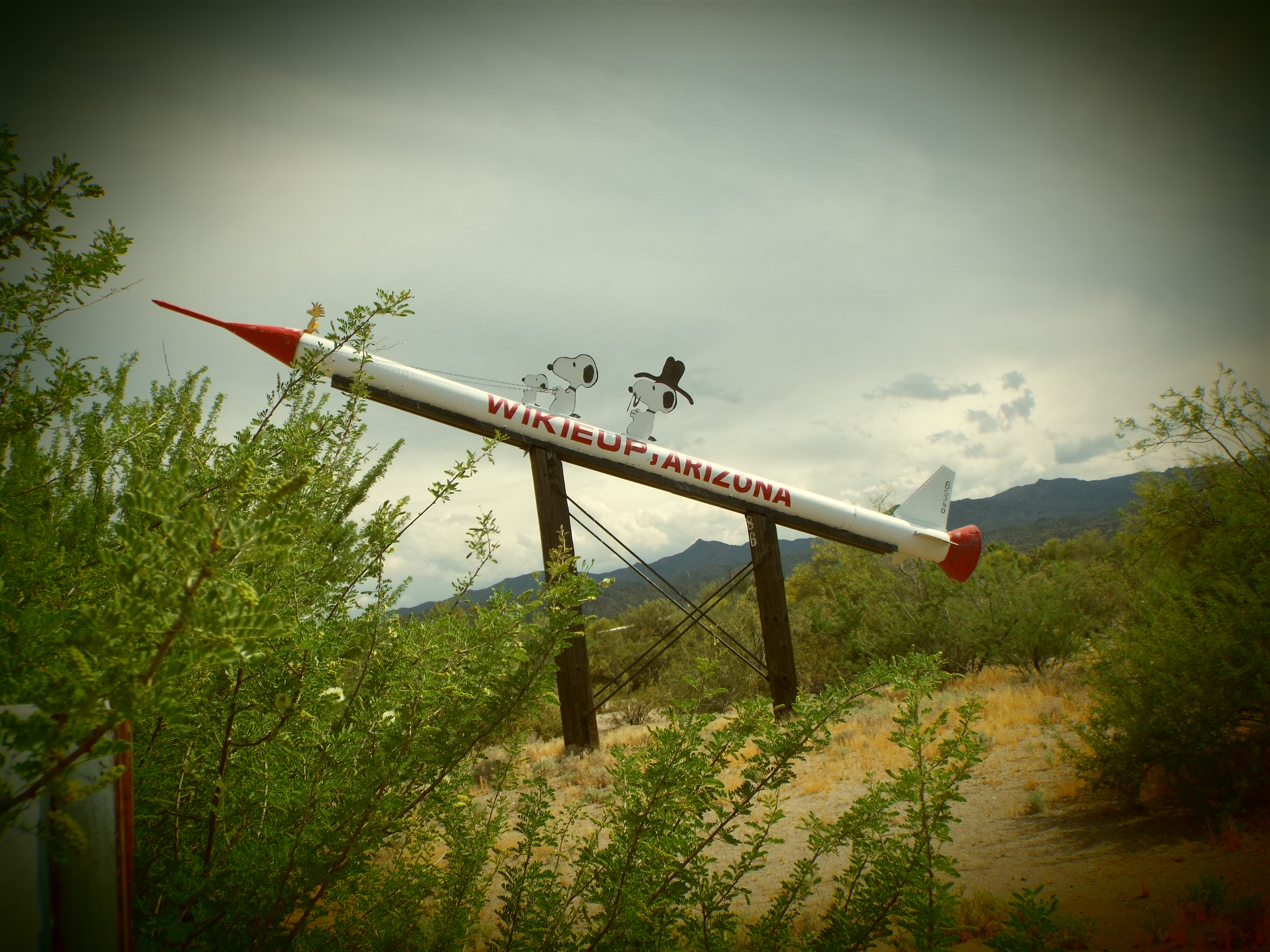
- Wikieup Snoopy rocket

- Location in Mohave County, Arizona
- Coordinates: 34°42′12″N 113°36′41″W
- Country: United States
- State: Arizona
- Counties: Mohave

Area
  - Total: 4.44 sq mi (11.49 km^{2})
  - Land: 4.44 sq mi (11.49 km^{2})
  - Water: 0 sq mi (0.00 km^{2})
- Elevation: 1,997 ft (609 m)

Population (2020)
  - Total: 135
  - Density: 30.4/sq mi (11.75/km^{2})
- Time zone: UTC-7 (MST)
- ZIP code: 85360
- Area code: 928
- FIPS code: 04-82880
- GNIS feature ID: 24690

Wikieup is an unincorporated community and census-designated place (CDP) located on U.S. Route 93 in Mohave County, Arizona, United States. It is located approximately 139 miles (224 km) northwest of Phoenix and 162 miles (261 km) southeast of Las Vegas. As of the 2020 census, the population of Wikieup was 135.

== History ==
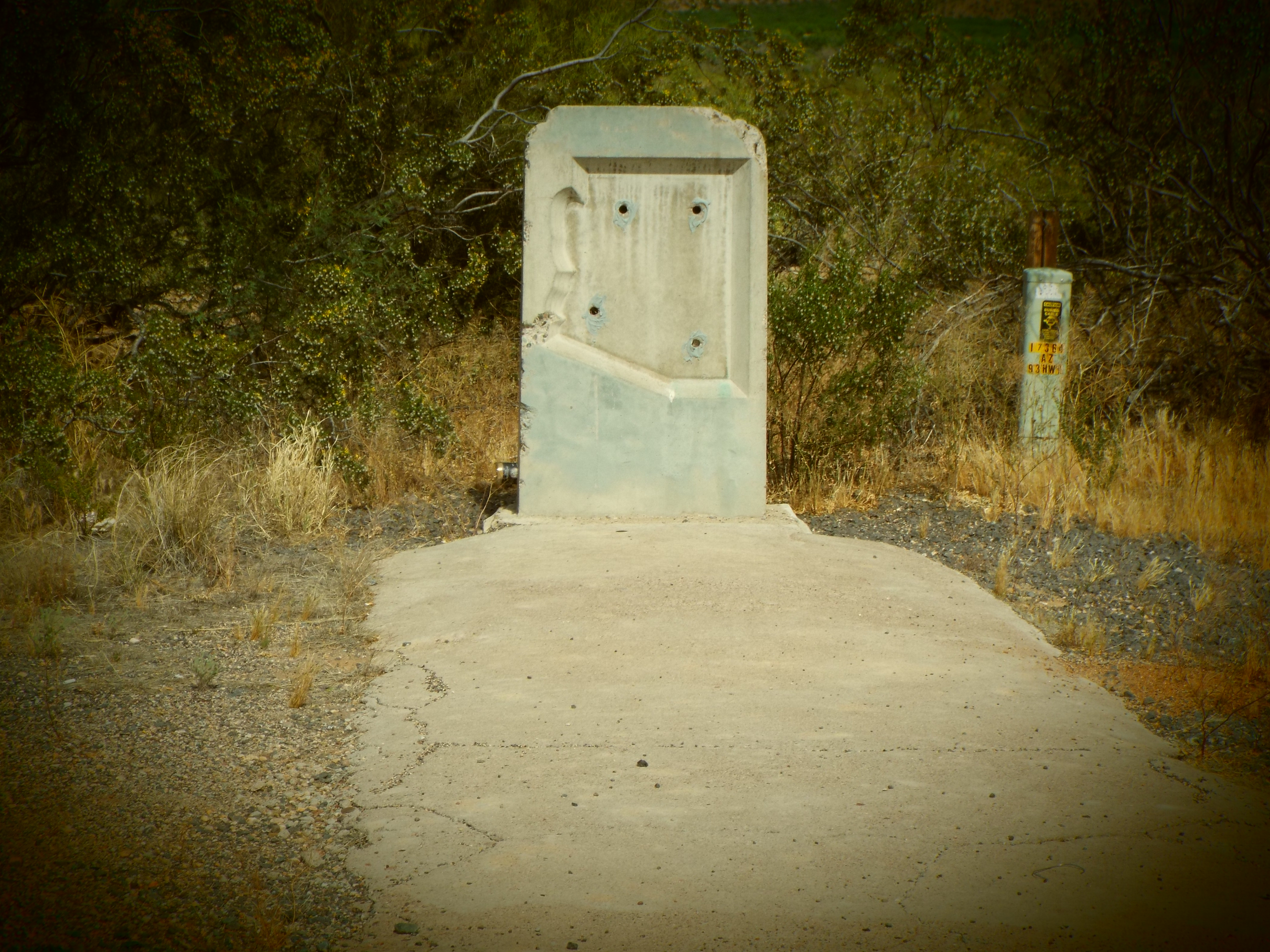
Vandalized historic marker

There is a vandalized historic marker in Wikieup whose inscription once read:

"First exploration probably by early Spanish explorers, Espejo in 1582 and Farfan in 1589. Explored later by Lt. Amiel W. Whipple in 1854. Important agriculture, mining, milling, and smelting area in our early days. The McCrackin Mine discovered by Jackson McCrackin and H. A. "Chloride Jack" Owen in 1874, lies 18 miles south. The Signal Mine was 12 miles south. Stamp mills were at Greenwood, 8 miles southwest and at Virginia City, 9 miles southwest. Cofer Hot Springs 3 miles east."

== Geography ==
Wikieup is in southeastern Mohave County in the valley of the Big Sandy River, between the Hualapai Mountains to the west and the Aquarius Mountains to the east. U.S. Route 93 passes through the community, leading northwest 54 miles (87 km) to Kingman, the Mohave county seat, and southeast 74 miles (119 km) to Wickenburg.

=== Climate ===
Wikieup has a hot desert climate (Köppen: BWh). The lowest recorded temperature was 14 °F (−10 °C) in 1990, with a high of 119 °F (48 °C) recorded in 1995. Average lows for January range from 33 to 64 °F (1 to 18 °C), with highs in July ranging from 68 to 105 °F (20 to 41 °C). Rainfall averages 9.88 inches (251 mm) annually.

Climate data for Wikieup, Arizona, 1991–2020 normals, extremes 1952–present
Month	Jan	Feb	Mar	Apr	May	Jun	Jul	Aug	Sep	Oct	Nov	Dec	Year
Record high °F (°C)	83 (28)	93 (34)	97 (36)	103 (39)	110 (43)	120 (49)	120 (49)	118 (48)	116 (47)	109 (43)	96 (36)	87 (31)	120 (49)
Mean daily maximum °F (°C)	65.7 (18.7)	68.1 (20.1)	75.0 (23.9)	82.4 (28.0)	91.0 (32.8)	101.1 (38.4)	105.1 (40.6)	103.6 (39.8)	98.0 (36.7)	87.0 (30.6)	74.9 (23.8)	64.6 (18.1)	84.7 (29.3)
Daily mean °F (°C)	50.0 (10.0)	51.9 (11.1)	57.5 (14.2)	63.5 (17.5)	71.8 (22.1)	80.8 (27.1)	87.5 (30.8)	86.6 (30.3)	80.1 (26.7)	68.9 (20.5)	57.3 (14.1)	48.9 (9.4)	67.1 (19.5)
Mean daily minimum °F (°C)	34.4 (1.3)	35.8 (2.1)	40.1 (4.5)	44.6 (7.0)	52.6 (11.4)	60.5 (15.8)	69.9 (21.1)	69.6 (20.9)	62.2 (16.8)	50.8 (10.4)	39.8 (4.3)	33.2 (0.7)	49.5 (9.7)
Record low °F (°C)	15 (−9)	8 (−13)	17 (−8)	21 (−6)	30 (−1)	39 (4)	50 (10)	47 (8)	37 (3)	25 (−4)	20 (−7)	14 (−10)	8 (−13)
Average precipitation inches (mm)	1.28 (33)	1.30 (33)	1.15 (29)	0.20 (5.1)	0.13 (3.3)	0.04 (1.0)	0.57 (14)	1.16 (29)	0.73 (19)	0.56 (14)	0.58 (15)	0.73 (19)	8.43 (214)
Average snowfall inches (cm)	0.2 (0.51)	0.0 (0.0)	0.0 (0.0)	0.0 (0.0)	0.0 (0.0)	0.0 (0.0)	0.0 (0.0)	0.0 (0.0)	0.0 (0.0)	0.0 (0.0)	0.0 (0.0)	0.0 (0.0)	0.2 (0.51)
Average precipitation days (≥ 0.01 in)	3.0	2.9	2.4	1.2	0.9	0.3	2.7	3.4	2.3	1.6	1.1	2.3	24.1
Source: NOAA

== Demographics ==
Historical population
Census	Pop.	Note	%±
2010	133		—
2020	135		1.5%
U.S. Decennial Census

== Education ==
Residents are zoned to the Owens-Whitney Elementary School District, which operates one K-8 school. Students may choose to attend Bagdad Unified School District or Kingman Unified School District for high school.

== Notable people ==
- Donald Machholz (1952–2022): American amateur astronomer who was credited with the discovery of 12 comets that bear his name.
