= Date Creek Mountains =

Landform in Yavapai County, Arizona

- Location within Arizona

Highest point
- Peak: Tenderfoot Hill, Date Creek Mountains (east terminus)
- Elevation: 3,477 ft (1,060 m)
- Coordinates: 34°10′38″N 112°51′33″W

Dimensions
- Length: 13 mi (21 km) E-W

Geography
- Country: United States
- State: Arizona
- Region(s): (northwest)-Sonoran Desert (Maria fold and thrust belt)
- District: Yavapai County
- Community: Congress, Arizona
- Borders on: Weaver Mountains-NE; Vulture Mountains-SE; Aguila Valley-S; McMullen Valley-SW; Butler Valley & Harcuvar Mtns-WSW; Alamo Lake-W; Maria fold and thrust belt–NW, W & SW

The Date Creek Mountains is a short, arid range in southwest Yavapai County, Arizona. Congress is on its southeast foothills, and Wickenburg lies 15 mi (24 km) southeast.

== Description and area ==
The short range is only about 13 mi (21 km) long. The Date Creek Mountains are located in the western region of the Arizona transition zone on its southwest. It borders the lower elevation Sonoran Desert to the southwest, where U.S. Route 93 in Arizona travels northwest x southeast, from Phoenix, Arizona to Kingman, Arizona, a stretch called the Joshua Tree Highway; the Yucca brevifolia Joshua trees find their southeast range here, as does an extension southeast of the Mojave Desert.

The Date Creek Range is also on the northeast border of landforms creating the separation between the southeast Mojave and northwest Sonoran Deserts. The region is named the Maria fold and thrust belt but here, southwest of the Date Creek's is the northwest of the region where three-ranges, and two-intermontane-valleys line parallel in an arc-shape. At these parallel landforms' northeast is the basin draining north to Alamo Lake. The Date Creek's lie to the ENE, the Aguila Valley lies to the southeast. The Poachie Range massif and the Arrastra Mountain Wilderness anchor this basin to the north, and northwest of the Date Creek Mountains.

The highpoint of the range is on its southeast, Tenderfoot Hill, 3,477 feet (1,060 m).

== Major thrust-faulted ranges ==
The major mountain ranges that are thrust northwesterly in the Maria fold and thrust belt region are, from north to south:

- Buckskin Mountains
- Butler Valley (Arizona)
- Harcuvar Mountains
- McMullen Valley
- Harquahala Mountains

Some of the thirty landforms in the fold-and-thrust-belt listed in a circular path around these three ranges are:

- NE, Alamo Lake State Park, NE Buckskin Mtns;
- Access roads from U.S. Route 93, northwest, dirt, and southwest, Arizona State Route 71 terminating at Aguila, Arizona, at the northeast of the Harquahala's;
- Southeast of the Harquahalas, three mountain ranges, and the Hassayampa and Harquahala Plains-(Harquahala Valley);
- The southwest and west perimeter of the three ranges is the Bouse Wash Drainage; the drainage is in the Ranegras Plain, but two small ranges, and the Bouse Hills abut the perimeter as well;
- The northwest abuts the Cactus Plain and the Cactus Plain Wilderness;
- The northwest also has the Buckskin Mountains extending into a western section at the confluence of the Colorado and Bill Williams Rivers. Buckskin Mountain State Park is located here.
- The Bill Williams River downstream from Alamo Lake State Park is the northern border of the three ranges, as well as the de facto border of fold-and-thrust-belt. The river is also a dividing line between the Mojave Desert north and northwest, and the Sonoran Desert, south and southeast; in California, the Colorado Desert subsection of the Sonoran Desert lies southwest.

== See also ==
- Maria fold and thrust belt
