= Harcuvar Mountains =

Landform in La Paz County, Arizona

- Location within Arizona

Highest point
- Peak: Smith Peak (Arizona)
- Elevation: 5,242 ft (1,598 m)
- Coordinates: 33°56′30″N 113°35′03″W

Dimensions
- Length: 25 mi (40 km) SW-NE
- Width: 5 mi (8.0 km)

Geography
- Country: United States
- State: Arizona
- Regions: Maria fold and thrust belt and Sonoran Desert
- Districts: La Paz County, AZ and Yavapai County, AZ
- Settlement(s): Wenden, Arizona–Salome, Arizona-(SW); Vicksburg, Harcuvar & Aguila, AZ-(SW & SE)
- Borders on: Buckskin Mtns, Butler Valley, McMullen Valley, Harquahala Mtns and Bill Williams River

The Harcuvar Mountains (Yavapai: Ahakuwa) are a narrow mountain range in western-central Arizona, United States. The range lies just east of the north–south Colorado River, and south of the east–west, west-flowing Bill Williams River, from Alamo Lake.

The range is part of a three-range sequence of mildly arc-shaped ranges, and two intermountain range valleys in the Maria fold and thrust belt, a region in western-central Arizona and southeast Southern California, with the Colorado River flowing south through the western part of the belt. The fold-and-thrust-belt region contains numerous plains, valleys, and mountain ranges, about 30 landforms in all.

The range is a narrow range about 25 mi long, and 5 mi wide, and trends southwest to northeast. The McMullen Valley is the southeast border of the range, and is traversed by U.S. Route 60.

Four peaks are found in the range; the highest peak is Smith Peak (Arizona), 5,242 feet (1,598 m) in the northeast, but not easily accessible by road. In the southwest, is Harcuvar Peak, at 4,618 feet (1,408 m), accessible by unimproved road, via Cottonwood Pass. Two other peaks lie in the center of the range; one lies adjacent and north of Cunningham Pass, called ECC Peak, at 3,000 feet (914 m), and further northeast, ECP Peak, at 4,593 feet (1,400 m).

In 1990, the Harcuvar Mountains Wilderness became part of the now over 109 million acre National Wilderness Preservation System established by the Wilderness Act of 1964. The Harcuvar Mountains Wilderness is in northeast La Paz County 82 miles northwest of Phoenix, Arizona.

== Regional access ==
One of the more important aspects of the Harcuvar Mountains is the major, and southern access route to Alamo Lake State Park approximately 30 miles (48 km) upriver on the Bill Williams River. The access road is the southern access to the lake, about 30 miles of unimproved road. It begins at Wenden, Arizona, and immediately climbs through the Harcuvars to Cunningham Pass. Another 24 miles traverses the Butler Valley's northeast, and the flatlands northeast of the Buckskin Mountains.

The entire southeast perimeter of the Harcuvar Mountains borders the McMullen Valley, with U.S. Route 80. The series of communities starting at the southwest are Vicksburg, Hope, and Harcuvar, (also located south of a small range, the Granite Wash Mountains), then Salome, Wenden, and lastly after a 26 miles (42 km) straight stretch, Aguila. At Aquila roads connect either northeast, or east to U.S. Route 93, the road to Kingman–Phoenix

== Three major thrust-faulted ranges ==
The major mountain ranges that run southeast to northwest in the Maria fold and thrust belt region are, from north to south:

- Buckskin Mountains
  - Butler Valley (Arizona)
- Harcuvar Mountains
  - McMullen Valley
- Harquahala Mountains

Some of the thirty landforms in the fold-and-thrust-belt listed in a circular path around these three ranges are: 1. NE, Alamo Lake State Park, NE Buckskin Mtns; 2. Access roads from U.S. Route 93, northwest, dirt, and southwest, Arizona State Route 71 terminating at Aguila, Arizona, at the northeast of the Harquahala's; 3. Southeast of the Harquahalas, three mountain ranges, and the Hassayampa and Harquahala Plains-(Harquahala Valley); 4. The southwest and west perimeter of the three ranges is the Bouse Wash Drainage; the drainage is in the Ranegras Plain, but two small ranges, and the Bouse Hills abut the perimeter as well; 5. The northwest abuts the Cactus Plain and the Cactus Plain Wilderness; 6. The northwest also has the Buckskin Mountains extending into a western section at the confluence of the Colorado and Bill Williams Rivers. Buckskin Mountain State Park is located here. 7. The Bill Williams River downstream from Alamo Lake State Park is the northern border of the three ranges, as well as the de facto border of fold-and-thrust-belt. The river is also a dividing line between the Mojave Desert north and northwest, and the Sonoran Desert, south and southeast; in California, the Colorado Desert subsection of the Sonoran Desert lies southwest.

== See also ==
- Maria fold and thrust belt
- Bouse Wash
- Centennial Wash (Maricopa County)
