= Granite Wash Mountains =

Mountain range in Arizona

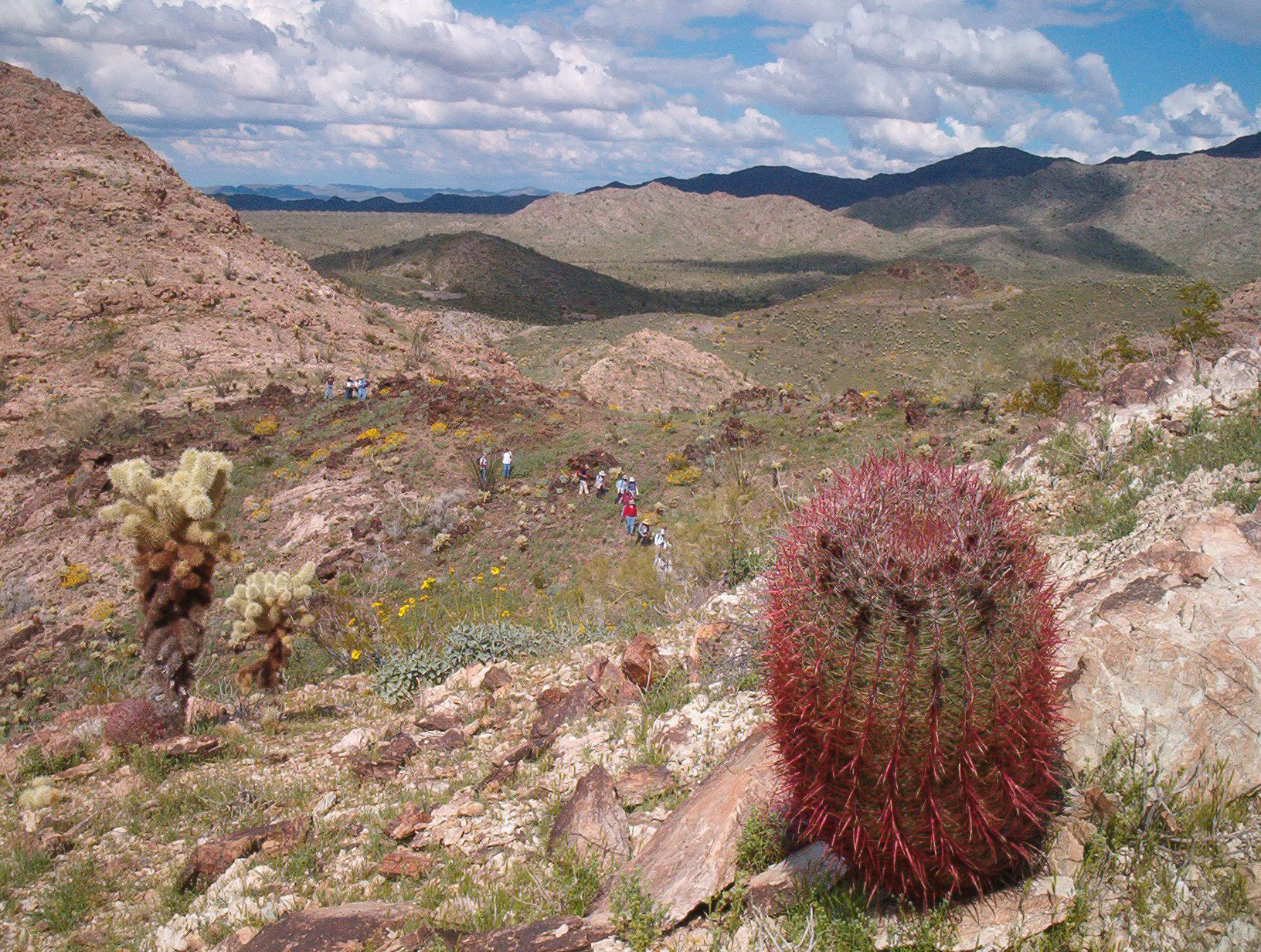

Highest point
- Peak: Salome Peak
- Elevation: 3,991 ft (1,216 m)
- Coordinates: 33°50′22″N 113°42′41″W

Dimensions
- Length: 8 mi (13 km) NW-SE-(water–divide)
- Width: 5 mi (8.0 km)

Geography
- Location within Arizona
- Country: United States
- State: Arizona
- Region(s): Bouse & Centennial Wash (Maria fold and thrust belt) ((northwest)-Sonoran Desert)
- District(s): La Paz County, Arizona, USA
- Settlements: McVay, AZ–Bouse, AZ; Salome, AZ, Harcuvar, AZ; Hope, AZ
- Range coordinates: 33°50′23″N 113°42′43″W
- Borders on: Harcuvar Mountains-NE-(attached); Little Harquahala Mountains-SE; Ranegras Plain–Bouse Wash-NW & W

The Granite Wash Mountains are a short, arid, low elevation mountain range of western-central Arizona, in the southeast of La Paz County. The range borders a slightly larger range southeast, the Little Harquahala Mountains; both ranges form a section on the same water divide between two desert washes. The washes flow in opposite directions, one northwest to the Colorado River, the other southeast to the Gila River.

== Description ==
The range is northwest-by-southeast trending and is in a region of about thirty landforms, plains, valleys, and mountain ranges, called the Maria fold and thrust belt. The region is in the Basin and Range and three mountain ranges are in a parallel, northwest-by-southeast trending thrust belt, with two intervening valleys. The Granite Wash Mountains are attached to the southwest end of the Harcuvar Mountains, the center range of the 3 basin and range-thrust mountains.

The Granite Wash range is on the same water divide as the Little Harquahala's and at the southwest end of the McMullen Valley; to the east, the range and water divide forces the upland drainage areas of the Centennial Wash to turn from southwest- to southeast-flowing towards the Gila River at the Gila Bend Mountains. To the west of the Granite Wash Mountains, the Bouse Wash flows northwest to the Colorado River, in the Lower Colorado River Valley.

== Maria fold and thrust belt ==
The three mountain ranges and two valleys bordered to the northeast:

- Buckskin Mountains
  - Butler Valley (Arizona)
- Harcuvar Mountains
  - McMullen Valley
- Harquahala Mountains

== Peaks and landforms ==
The highest elevation in the mountains is Salome Peak at 3,991 feet (1,216 m), in the range's center.

Granite Wash Pass is located at the northwest end of the southern mountain pair, the Little Harquahala's; Hope is west and Harcuvar, Arizona is east. The pass contains the Arizona and California Railroad line, as well as U.S. Route 60 in Arizona form Brenda at Interstate 10 in Arizona, and the route northeast to Aguila, then to Wickenburg, on U.S. 93.

=== Bouse Wash, Centennial Wash ===
The Granite Wash and Little Harquahala Mountains are on the northwest by southeast water divide between two washes. The Bouse Wash flows northwest to the Colorado River; Centennial Wash (Maricopa County) is east and flows southeast to meet the Gila River at the great Gila Bend, adjacent the Gila Bend Mountains.
