= Little Harquahala Mountains =

Landform in La Paz County, Arizona

- Location within Arizona

Highest point
- Peak: Martin Peak
- Elevation: 2,333 ft (711 m)

Dimensions
- Length: 13 mi (21 km) NW-SE
- Width: 6 mi (9.7 km)

Geography
- Country: United States
- State: Arizona
- Regions: Maria fold and thrust belt and Sonoran Desert
- County: La Paz
- Settlements: Salome, Harcuvar and Hope
- Range coordinates: 33°41′21″N 113°36′09″W
- Borders on: Centennial Wash and Bouse Wash

The Little Harquahala Mountains are a small, arid, low-elevation mountain range of western-central Arizona, in southeastern La Paz County.

The range is northwest-by-southeast-trending and is in a region of about thirty landforms, plains, valleys, and mountain ranges called the Maria fold and thrust belt. The region is in the Basin and Range and three mountain ranges are in a parallel, northwest-by-southeast-trending thrust belt, with two intervening valleys. The Little Harquahala Range borders the second valley and third mountain range, the McMullen Valley and Harquahala Mountains, on their southwest borders.

The range is a section of a water divide for tributaries to two river watersheds on the Gila and Colorado Rivers. An even smaller range is connected north on the water divide, the 8-mile (13 km) long Granite Wash Mountains.

== Maria fold and thrust belt ==
The three mountain ranges and two valleys bordered to the northeast:

- Buckskin Mountains
  - Butler Valley (Arizona)
- Harcuvar Mountains
  - McMullen Valley
- Harquahala Mountains

=== Peaks and landforms ===
The highest elevation in the mountains is Martin Peak at 2,333 feet (711 m), in the southeast. Harquar Peak at 2,100 feet (640 m) is located to the central-north.

Granite Wash Pass is located at the northwest end of the mountains; Hope is west and Harcuvar, Arizona is east. The pass contains a rail transportation line, as well as U.S. Route 60 in Arizona from Brenda at Interstate 10 in Arizona, and the route northeast to Aguila, then to Wickenburg, on U.S. 93.

=== Bouse Wash and Centennial Wash ===
The Little Harquahala Mountains are on the northwest-by-southeast water divide between two washes. The Bouse Wash flows northwest to the Colorado River; Centennial Wash (Maricopa County) is east and flows southeast to meet the Gila River at the "great Gila Bend", adjacent to the Gila Bend Mountains.

== See also ==
- List of Bouse and Centennial Wash landforms
