= Butler Valley (Arizona) =

Landform in La Paz County, Arizona

- Location within Arizona
- Length: 35 mi (56 km) SW x NE
- Width: 9 mi (14 km)

Geography
- Country: United States
- State: Arizona
- Regions: Maria fold and thrust belt; Sonoran Desert
- County: La Paz
- Borders on: Buckskin Mountains; Harcuvar Mountains
- Coordinates: 33.934°N 113.810°W
- Interactive map of Butler Valley

Butler Valley is a valley of the Maria fold and thrust belt in western Arizona, southwestern United States. It lies east of the Colorado River, and is south of the west-flowing Bill Williams River.

== Description ==
Butler Valley is one of the two valleys in a (major) three-mountain range, two-valley sequence. Other minor ranges are on the perimeters, but thirty landforms are part of the region. The valley drains southwesterly into the northwest flowing Bouse Wash Drainage. Cunningham Wash drains the valley southwest to meet with the Bouse. The valley also turns somewhat southwest to the north of the Harcuvar Mountains, where Cunningham Pass holds the 30-mile route, unimproved major access road to Alamo Lake State Park; the route traverses the Butler Valley in the northeast, then skirts the northeast of the Buckskins to meet the south side of Alamo Lake. Butler Valley is sparsely populated, with the road to Alamo Lake being the only paved road.

The northeast third of the valley drains northeast from a water divide, then north to Alamo Lake only 10 mi distant; Cunningham Wash drains to the southwest. At the northeast end of the Buckskin Mountains, a basin forms attached to Butler Valley on the valley's northeast, and with the Black Mountains (Yavapai County) bordered northeast; southeast is another up-drainage basin attached to the northeast of the McMullen Valley, the Aguila Valley to the southeast, and at the southwest of the small range, the Date Creek Mountains.

The majority of Butler Valley is owned by the Arizona State Land Department. More than 99% of the valley is owned by the state, held in trust for the support of public schools in the state. The valley is used as a reserve for groundwater, to store water from the Colorado River for Arizona. It holds more than 6 million acre-feet of water, and is strategically located near the Central Arizona Project.

In 2022, The Arizona Republic reported that the state land department had handed over thousands of acres to a Saudi company called Fondamonte, and gave it permission to withdraw unlimited amounts of groundwater to grow alfalfa, which would be exported to Saudi Arabia.

== Geology ==
The major mountain ranges that are thrust northwesterly in the Maria fold and thrust belt region are, from north to south:

- Buckskin Mountains
- Butler Valley
- Harcuvar Mountains
- McMullen Valley
- Harquahala Mountains

Some of the thirty landforms in the fold-and-thrust-belt listed in a circular path around these three ranges are:

1. Northeast, Alamo Lake State Park, Northeast Buckskin Mountains;
2. Access roads from U.S. Route 93, northwest, dirt, and southwest, Arizona State Route 71 terminating at Aguila, Arizona, at the northeast of the Harquahalas;
3. Southeast of the Harquahalas, three mountain ranges, and the Hassayampa and Harquahala Plains (Harquahala Valley);
4. The southwest and west perimeter of the three ranges is the Bouse Wash Drainage; the drainage is in the Ranegras Plain, but two small ranges, and the Bouse Hills abut the perimeter as well;
5. The northwest abuts the Cactus Plain and the Cactus Plain Wilderness;
6. The northwest also has the Buckskin Mountains extending into a western section at the confluence of the Colorado and Bill Williams Rivers. Buckskin Mountain State Park is located here.
7. The Bill Williams River downstream from Alamo Lake State Park is the northern border of the three ranges, as well as the de facto border of fold-and-thrust-belt. The river is also a dividing line between the Mojave Desert north and northwest, and the Sonoran Desert, south and southeast; in California, the Colorado Desert subsection of the Sonoran Desert lies southwest.
