= Maria fold and thrust belt =

Geologic feature in California and Arizona

Coordinates: 33.8984°N 114.5923°W

Maria Fold-and-Thrust-Belt
- Fault system
- Interactive map of Maria Fold-and-Thrust-Belt
- Location: San Bernardino County-CA; Mohave County-AZ-(N); La Paz County-AZ-(S), Mojave Desert-NW—Sonoran Desert-SE, California, United States
- Age: 86.3±1.3 – ~55 Ma
- Orogeny: Laramide

Area
  - Total: ~10,000 km^{2} (3,900 mi^{2}) (post-Basin & Range extension)

Dimensions
  - Length: ~160 km (99 mi) (post-Basin & Range ext.)
  - Width: ~60 km (37 mi) (post-Basin & Range ext.)

The Maria fold and thrust belt (MFTB) is a portion of the North American Cordillera orogen in which geological structures accommodate roughly north–south to northwest-southeast vergent Mesozoic age crustal shortening. This lies in contrast to the remainder of the Cordillera, in which shortening is predominantly east–west. Structures associated with the Maria Fold and Thrust Belt are exposed in a series of mountain ranges in southeastern California and western Arizona. Many of the deep structures of the MFTB have been exposed due to east–west to northeast-southwest Cenozoic age extension and unroofing.

In some parts of this fold-and-thrust-belt region, the extension resulted in the emplacement of metamorphic core complexes, the 'type example' of which is defined by the Whipple Mountains in southeastern California.

== Geology ==
The Maria fold-and-thrust-belt is defined as the region where the compression that helped create the North American Cordillera – abruptly changed directions. North of the Maria fold-and-thrust-belt, the mountain ranges trend north–south, with east–west compression due to the subduction of the Farallon slab beneath western North America. At the Maria fold-and-thrust-belt, compressional deformation shifts to being generally north–south, with the front of the mountain ranges being defined by a roughly east–west line. This line then shifts gently to the east-southeast, where the Cordilleran deformation diffuses into a broad shear zone in northeastern Mexico.

Another notable feature that differentiates it from the rest of the Cordillera is that the deformation involves the rocks of the North American craton. Deformation in the remainder of the Cordillera only involves rocks that were part of the near-shore and offshore, sedimentary sequences.

== Ecology ==
Since soils and climate differ across the Maria fold-and-thrust-belt, this regional geologic structure can be considered a "dividing line" for a number of flora and fauna species. For example, the species range of the endangered California Fan Palm, Washingtonia filifera does not extend north of the Maria fold-and-thrust-belt, or more specifically the Turtle Mountains.

== Ranges ==
The Maria fold-and-thrust-belt comprises a large number of ranges in the south-eastern Mojave and north-western Sonoran deserts, including the:

- Big Horn Mountains
- Big Maria Mountains
- Bouse Hills
- Buckskin Mountains
- Dome Rock Mountains
- Granite Wash Mountains
- Harcuvar Mountains
- Harquahala Mountains
- Little Harquahala Mountains
- Little Maria Mountains
- McCoy Mountains
- Mesquite Mountains
- Moon Mountains
- Mule Mountains
- New Water Mountains
- Palen Mountains
- Plomosa Mountains
- Rawhide Mountains
- Riverside Mountains
- Whipple Mountains

== Regional landforms ==
List of some regional landforms. (The ~east-west Bill Williams River appears as part of the central and northern perimeter of the Maria fold-and-thrust-belt, approximately paralleling the Rawhide Mountains, a slight northwest range on west end.)

- Alamo Lake State Park
- Bill Williams River
- Bouse Wash
- Butler Valley (Arizona)
- Cactus Plain
- Chemehuevi Wash
- Colorado River
- Colorado River Indian Reservation
- Lake Havasu
- La Posa Plain
- Lower Colorado River Valley
- McMullen Valley
- Ranegras Plain
- Rice Valley
- Vidal Valley

== See also ==
- List of mountain ranges of Arizona
- List of mountain ranges of California
- List of mountain ranges of the Lower Colorado River Valley
