= Buckskin Mountains (Arizona) =

Landform in La Paz County

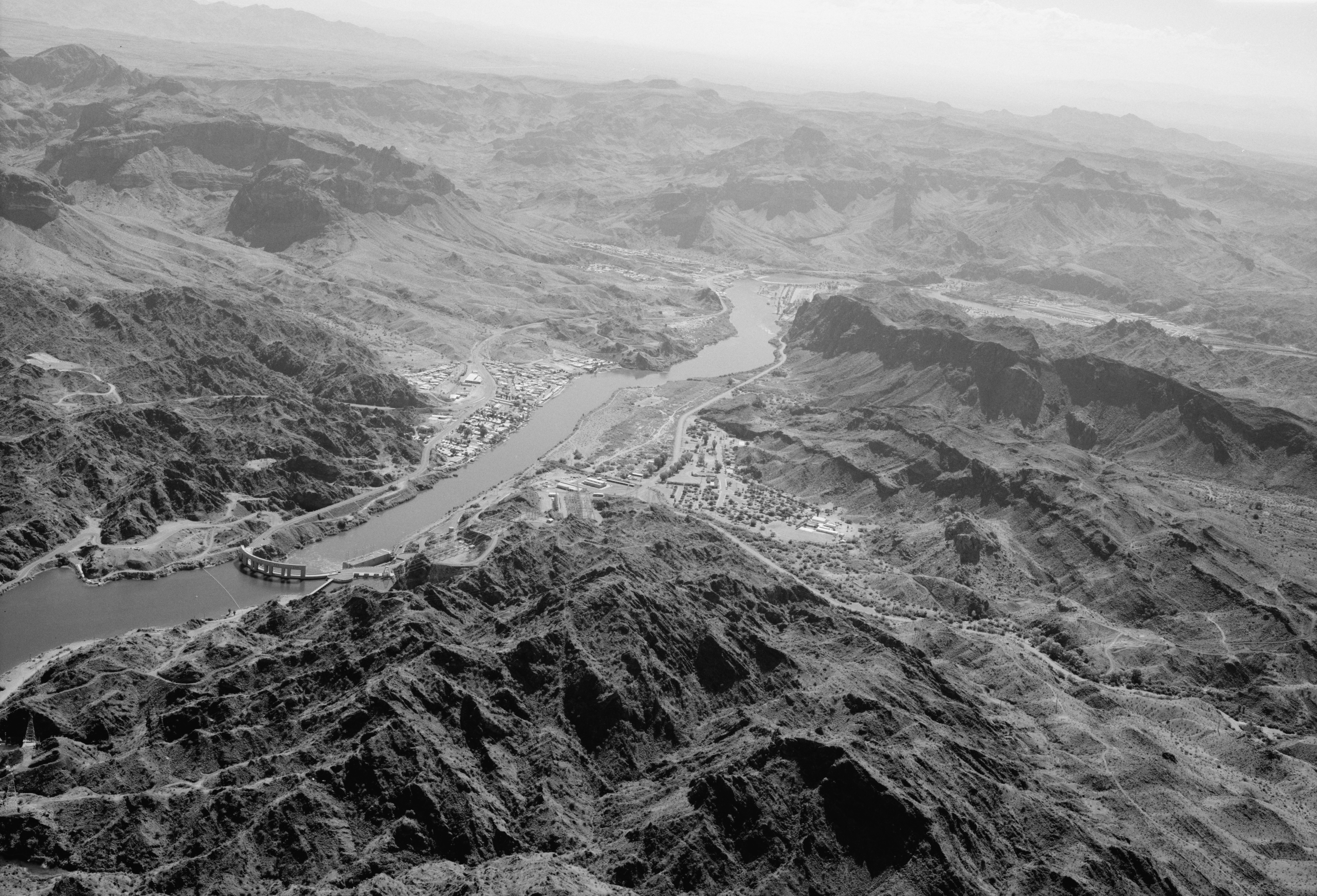
- (View south); At photo left: Buckskin Mountains (Arizona) and Castle Rock (Arizona) formation in the Buckskins, west-southwest region. Large massif at photo bottom, is the Whipple Mountains.

Highest point
- Peak: Battleship Peak
- Elevation: 2,569 ft (783 m)
- Coordinates: 34°04′28″N 113°48′29″W

Dimensions
- Length: 30 mi (48 km) E-W & (SW x NE)

Geography
- Location within Arizona
- Country: United States
- State: Arizona
- Regions: Maria fold and thrust belt, Sonoran Desert and Mojave Desert
- County: La Paz
- Communities: Bouse, AZ and Parker Dam, CA
- Range coordinates: 34°10′12″N 113°50′46″W
- Borders on: Bill Williams Mountains, Rawhide Mountains, Bill Williams River, Butler Valley, Harcuvar Mountains, Gibraltar Mountain Wilderness, Buckskin Mountain State Park and Alamo Lake State Park

The Buckskin Mountains is a mountain range in La Paz County, Arizona, United States. The range lies just east of the north–south Colorado River, and borders south of the east–west, west-flowing Bill Williams River.

== Description ==
The range is part of a three-range sequence of mildly arc-shaped ranges, and two intermountain valleys in the Maria fold and thrust belt, a region in western Arizona and southeast Southern California, with the Colorado River flowing south through the western part of the belt. The fold-and-thrust-belt region contains numerous plains, valleys, and mountain ranges, about 30 landforms in all.

The Buckskin Mountains also extend west into a section abutting the Colorado River. Buckskin Mountain State Park borders the south of the Bill Williams River.

== Buckskin Mountains: west, central, and southeast ==
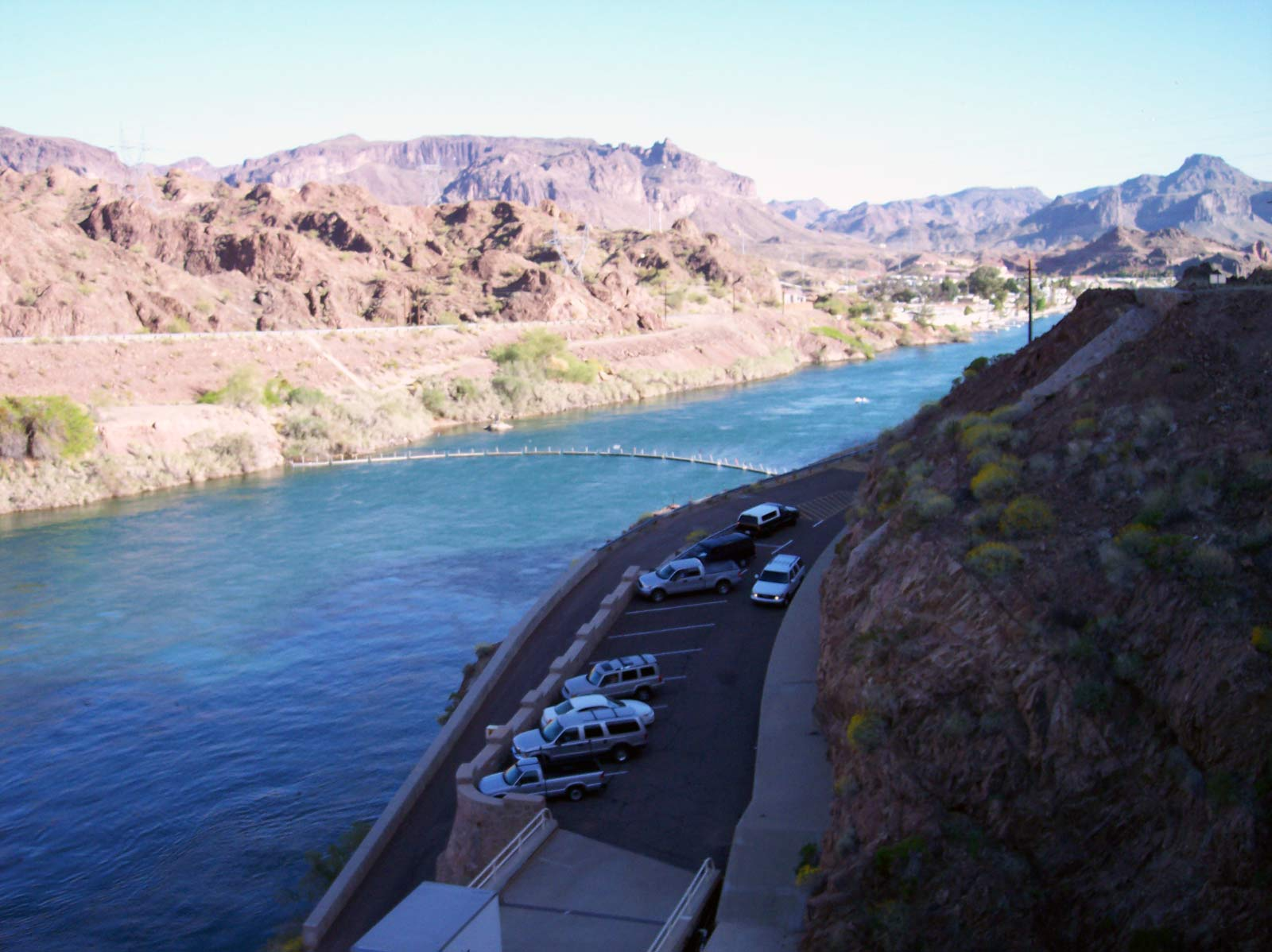
Extreme west & southwest terminus of the Buckskin Mountains at the Colorado River and Parker Dam. (view south) The long ridgeline peak is Castle Rock.

The southeast section of the Buckskin Mountains are part of a three-mountain range thrust-faulted system, with the Harcuvar and Harquahala Mountains. The highest peak in the section is Battleship Peak, 2,569 feet (783 m), at the southwest end, and directly northeast of Bouse in the Ranegras Plain, and the Bouse Wash Drainage.

The west end of the mountains abut the north–south Colorado River. Located here is the Gibraltar Mountain Wilderness, with Gibraltar Mountain, at 1,566 feet (477 m).

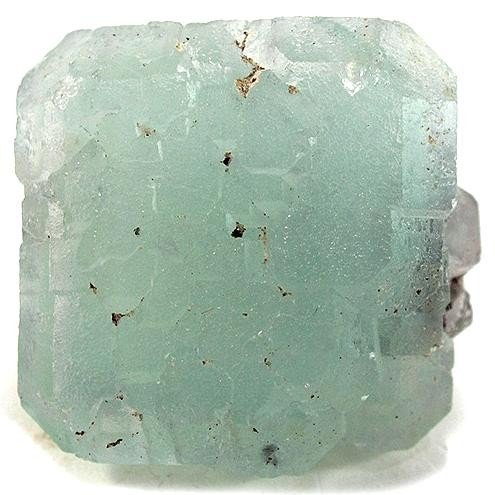
Fluorite-cube specimen from the Buckskin Mountains.

The entire north perimeter of the range is the Bill Williams River. Buckskin Mountain State Park is at its confluence in the northwest at the Colorado River. Abutting the Bill Williams in the center is the Swansea Wilderness; the northeast contains the Rawhide Mountains Wilderness on both sides of the river. The northeast of the range borders Alamo Lake State Park-(Alamo Lake), which also borders the Rawhide Mountains on the lake's northwest.

Another peak in the central-west, away from the range's east–west centerline, at the south is Planet Peak, at 3,141 feet (957 m). Planet Peak is directly adjacent at the northeast of the Cactus Plain and the East Cactus Plain Wilderness. The most easily identifiable Peak is "Black Peak," at 1,594 feet (486 m) to the South East. It is known to locals as "P Mountain" due to the large white "P" painted on its west side by the nearby town of Parker.

== Three major thrust-faulted ranges ==
The major mountain ranges that are thrust northwesterly in the Maria fold and thrust belt region are, from north to south:

- Buckskin Mountains
- Butler Valley (Arizona)
- Harcuvar Mountains
- McMullen Valley
- Harquahala Mountains

Some of the thirty landforms in the fold-and-thrust-belt listed in a circular path around these three ranges are: 1. NE, Alamo Lake State Park, NE Buckskin Mtns; 2. Access roads from U.S. Route 93, northwest, dirt, and southwest, Arizona State Route 71 terminating at Aguila, Arizona, at the northeast of the Harquahala's; 3. Southeast of the Harquahalas, three mountain ranges, and the Hassayampa and Harquahala Plains-(Harquahala Valley); 4. The southwest and west perimeter of the three ranges is the Bouse Wash Drainage; the drainage is in the Ranegras Plain, but two small ranges, and the Bouse Hills abut the perimeter as well; 5. The northwest abuts the Cactus Plain and the Cactus Plain Wilderness; 6. The northwest also has the Buckskin Mountains extending into a western section at the confluence of the Colorado and Bill Williams Rivers. Buckskin Mountain State Park is located here. 7. The Bill Williams River downstream from Alamo Lake State Park is the northern border of the three ranges, as well as the de facto border of fold-and-thrust-belt. The river is also a dividing line between the Mojave Desert north and northwest, and the Sonoran Desert, south and southeast; in California, the Colorado Desert subsection of the Sonoran Desert lies southwest.

== See also ==
- List of mountain ranges of Arizona
