= Granite Wash Pass =

Gap in La Paz County, Arizona, US

Coordinates: 33°44′53″N 113°40′25″W

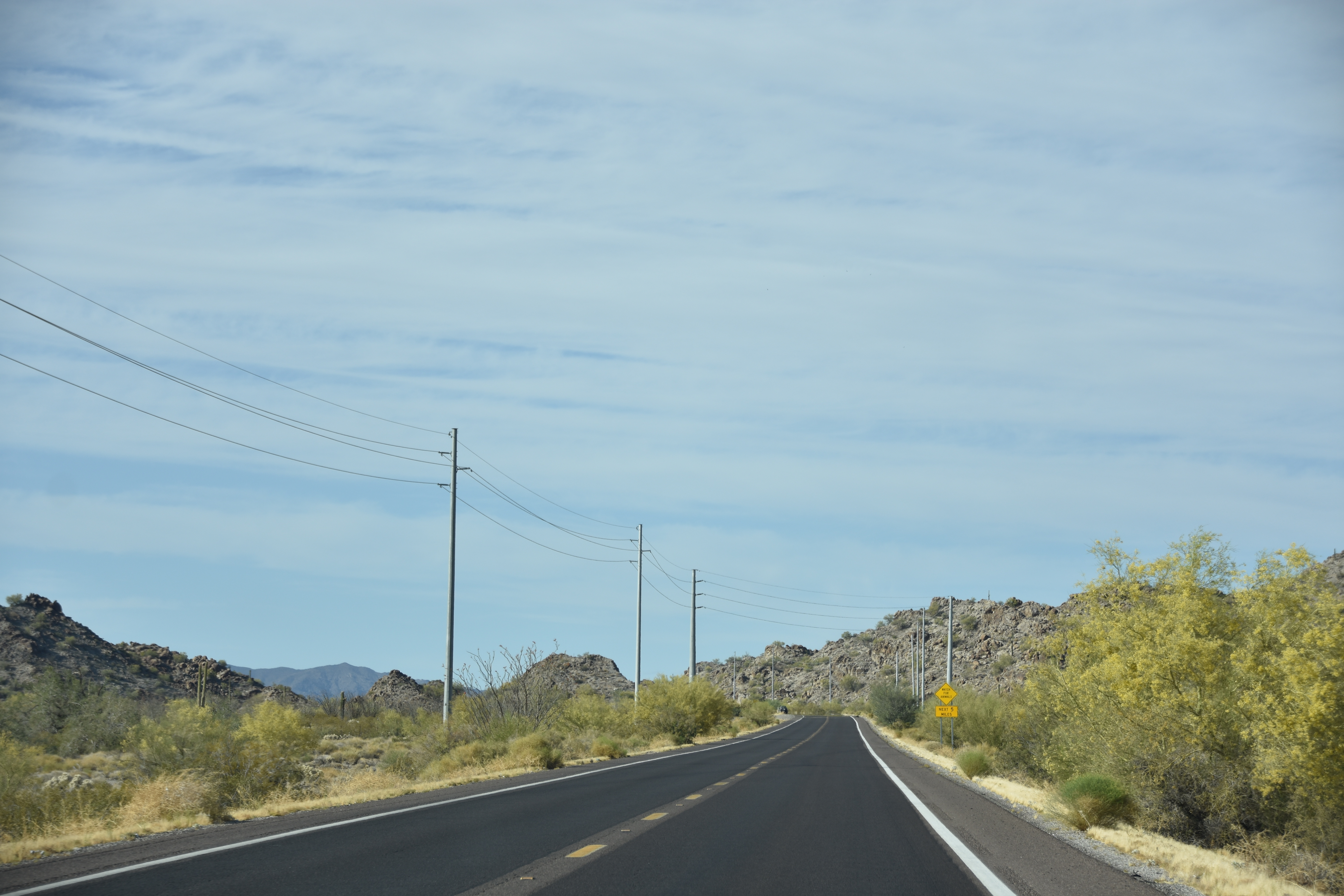
U.S. Highway 60 at Granite Wash Pass, Granite Wash Mountains, La Paz Mountains, Arizona

Granite Wash Pass is a gap between the Granite Wash Mountains and the Little Harquahala Mountains, in La Paz County, Arizona. Granite Wash Pass is located at the southwest end of the Granite Wash Mountains and the northwest end of the Little Harquahala Mountains. The apex of the pass is at an elevation of 1,834 feet/559 meters.

== History ==
The Granite Wash Pass has been a route between the Colorado River and the interior of Arizona from November 1863 when teamsters Gird and Sage discovered a route what became the La Paz–Wikenburg Road through Granite Wash Pass. In the early years a waterhole, Granite Water existed within the pass. The maps of the route in later years, Granite Water is no longer mentioned. Perhaps it was insufficient or had dried up. Granite Water might have been a temporary spring or waterhole created for a few years as a result of the extreme rainfall in Arizona by the storms that caused the Great Flood of 1862. Also stations for the stage lines like the one at Desert Station and the original watering place at Flint's had developed wells that provided more water.

Today the pass contains the Arizona and California Railroad line, as well as U.S. Route 60 in Arizona from Hope on the west side of the pass and Harcuvar, Arizona on the east.
