= Arizona transition zone =

Ecoregion section

Simplified Arizona geographic regions.

The Arizona transition zone is a diagonal northwest-by-southeast region across central Arizona. The region is a transition from the higher-elevation Colorado Plateau in Northeast Arizona and the Basin and Range region of lower-elevation deserts in the southwest and south.

Northwest Arizona transitions to the lower elevation Mojave Desert of southern California, Nevada and Utah, with an indicator species of Joshua trees and other species, and southwestwards regions of the Sonoran Desert, along the Lower Colorado River Valley; in Arizona's south, all of central and eastern desert Sonoran Desert regions merge southwards into Sonora, Mexico. The transition zone includes the Mogollon Rim and the White Mountains and extends into western New Mexico.

In the Arizona ecoregion section, the Arizona transition zone is the major section of the EPA designated, Level III ecoregion, Arizona/New Mexico Mountains ecoregion. The other two outlier subregions to the transition zone in Arizona, are the Kaibab Plateau of the North Rim of the Grand Canyon, and associated ranges of the Chuska Mountains region of the northeast Arizona and northwest New Mexico.

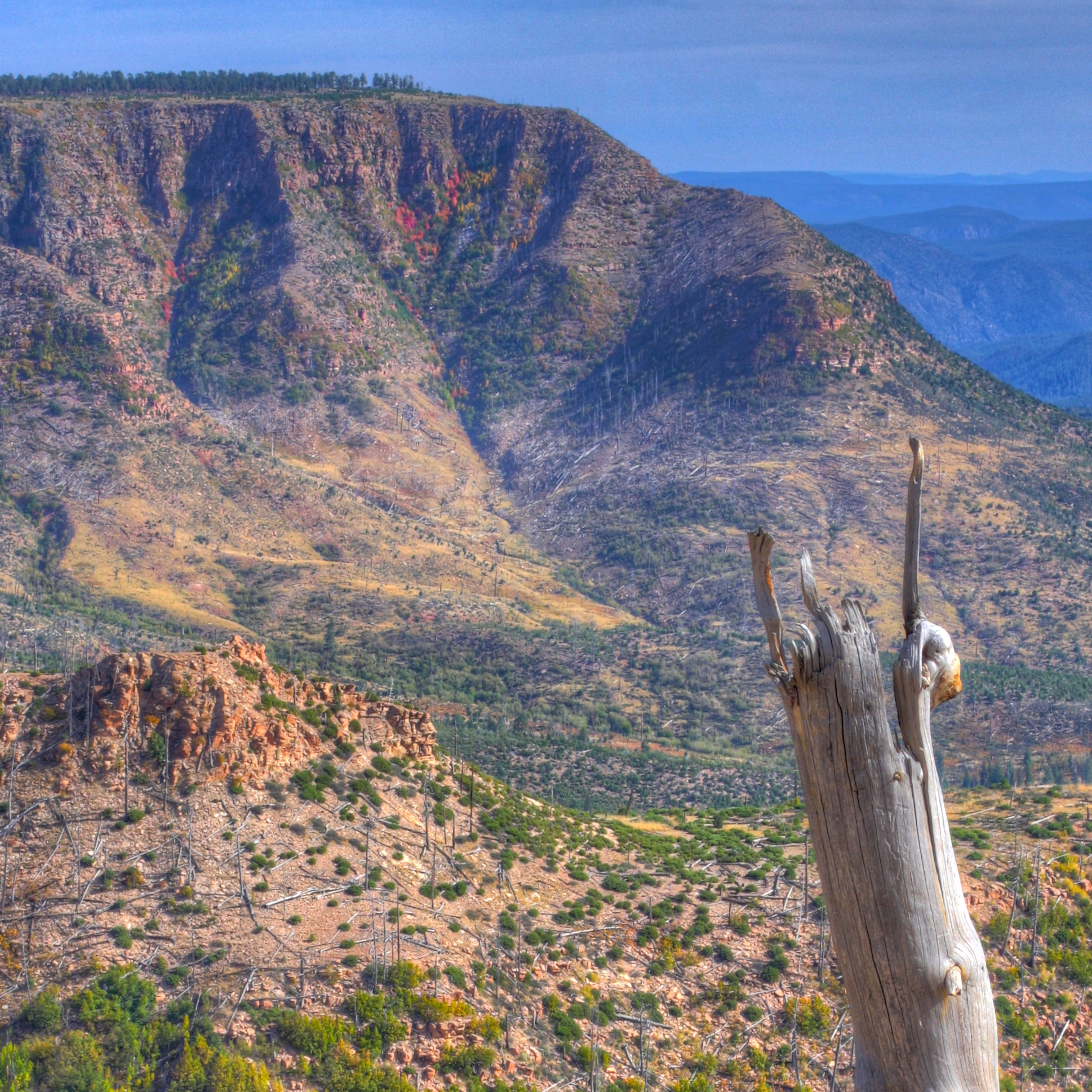
The edge of the Mogollon Rim east of Pine, Arizona

== Geography ==
The transition zone is dominated by the Mogollon Plateau at the southern edge of the Coconino Plateau of the Flagstaff region and the San Francisco volcanic field; the Mogollon Rim borders the plateau which extends from Oak Creek Canyon on the west, to the east at the highest elevations of Arizona in the central and western White Mountains.

== List of mountain ranges of the Arizona transition zone ==
The Arizona transition zone map is similar to the yellow transition region shown above.

=== Central mountain ranges ===
- Black Hills (Yavapai County)
- Dripping Spring Mountains (for Dripping Spring Quartzite)
- Limestone Hills
- Mazatzal Mountains
- New River Mountains
- Sierra Ancha
- Superstition Mountains
- Usery Mountains

=== Western region ranges ===
- Aquarius Mountains
- Black Hills (Yavapai County)
- Black Mountains (Yavapai County)
- Bradshaw Mountains
- Cottonwood Mountains
- Date Creek Mountains
- Hieroglyphic Mountains
- Juniper Mountains
- McCloud Mountains
- Mohon Mountains
- Music Mountains
- Peacock Mountains
- Poachie Range
  - (Alamo Lake, Aguila Valley)
- Santa Maria Mountains
- Sierra Prieta
- Sullivan Buttes
- Vulture Mountains
- Weaver Mountains

=== Eastern region ranges ===
- Big Lue Mountains
- Black Hills (Greenlee County)
- Blackjack Mountains, Arizona
- Gila Mountains (Graham County)
- Hayes Mountains
- Mescal Mountains
- Natanes Mountains
- Pinal Mountains
- Salt River Mountains (Gila County)
- Santa Teresa Mountains
- Sevenmile Mountains, Arizona
- Sierra Aguilada–(New Mexico)
- White Mountains–(central-southern regions)

== See also ==
- List of regions of Arizona
