= Dick Wick Hall =

American humorist (1877–1926)

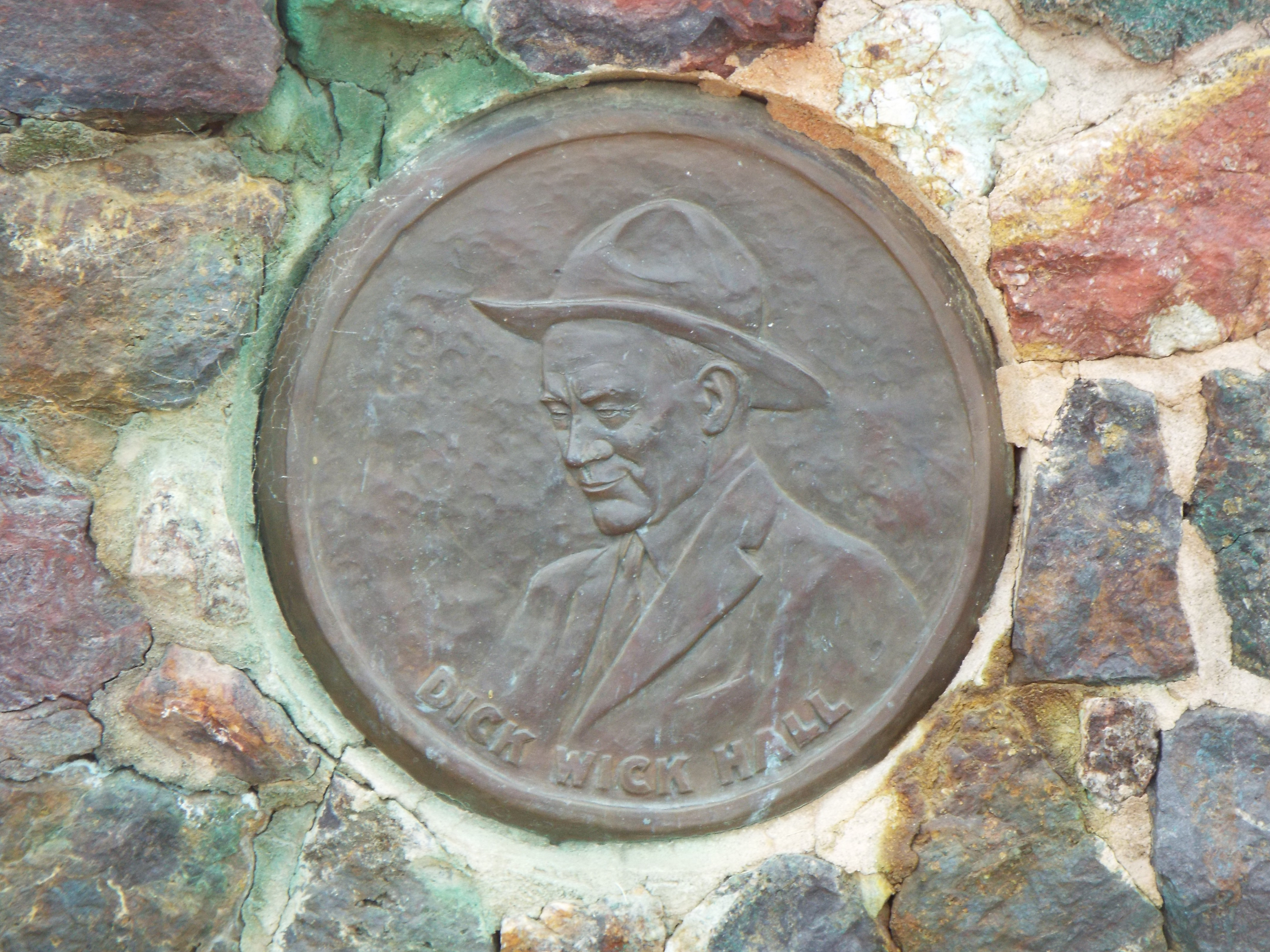
- Dick Wick Hall
- Born: DeForest Hall; March 20, 1877; Creston, Iowa
- Died: April 26, 1926 (aged 49); Los Angeles, California
- Education: University of Nebraska
- Occupations: Writer, Real Estate promoter
- Spouse: Daysie Mae Sutton

Dick Wickenburg "Dick Wick" Hall (born DeForest Hall, March 20, 1877 – April 28, 1926) was an American humorist. As co-founder and initial resident of Salome, Arizona he began publishing The Salome Sun, a newsletter containing tall tales and humorous prose. Hall created a variety of characters for his newsletter, the most famous being a seven-year-old frog that had never learned to swim. Excerpts from the Sun became a regular feature of The Saturday Evening Post, appearing in the magazine from 1920 until Hall's death in 1926.

== Life ==
Hall was born DeForest Hall to Thomas and Florence Hall on March 20, 1877, at his family's farm near Creston, Iowa. During his youth he was interested in plants and animals, and produced a sizable collection of mounted birds and animals. The collection would later be acquired by the University of Nebraska. He was educated in public schools before enrolling at the University of Nebraska. In college he studied engineering and ornithology. He left the university before graduation and worked briefly as a journalist and fireman on the Chicago, Burlington and Quincy Railroad.

After seeing a display of Hopi artifacts during a fair in Omaha, Nebraska, Hall decided to visit Arizona Territory. He arrived in the territory in 1898, spending some time on the Hopi Reservation before moving to Pleasant Valley. There he worked at construction, as a gardener, and as a census taker. In 1900, Hall moved to Phoenix where his brother, Ernest, was employed as territorial librarian. During February and March of that year he was business manager of the Arizona Graphic. In 1901, the brothers moved to Wickenburg and began publishing a newspaper, the News Herald. The following year, Hall had his name legally changed to "Dick Wickenburg Hall". As to why the new name was selected, Hall had never liked his given name and had gone by "Dick" as a child. The addition of "Wickenburg" was done to satisfy Hall's desire to have a middle name and in honor of Henry Wickenburg. The new name was shortened in common use to "Dick Wick Hall".

While the Hall's newspaper was turning into a failure, they purchased an interest in a gold mine in the Harcuvar Mountains. The mine, the Glory Hole Mine, was successful for a time and spawned a minor gold rush. About this time Hall decided to settle in the area near the mine. Toward this end, he partnered with Charles H. Pratt to claim 1,500 acres (610 ha) of land near to where the Santa Fe Railroad was planning to build a new rail line. They then sunk the first water well in northern Yuma County (now La Paz County). Hall named the new town "Salome – Where She Danced", supposedly after Pratt's wife, Grace Salome, removed her shoes and began hopping on the hot desert sand. The partners filed the paperwork establishing Salome on January 10, 1905. When they discovered that the initial estimate of where the railroad would build was incorrect, the town was then moved about 1 mile (1.6 km) to be closer to the new tracks. The town served as Hall's home for the rest of his life. In addition to his home, Hall opened a post office, restaurant, and store.

In 1909, Hall met Daysie Mae Sutton of Portland, Oregon during a business trip to Los Angeles. They married on April 29, 1911, and had two children: Dick Wick Jr. and Jane Elizabeth.

It was not until 1920 that a road connected Salome to the outside world. Prior to that all access was either by the railroad or a dirt trail. With the arrival of the road, Hall opened a gas station, the "Laughing Gas Service Station". To promote business he began placing signs about 25 miles (40 km) on the highway either side of the town. Examples of the signs read "Tickle Lizzie's Carburetor with Laughing Gas", "Old Rockefeller Made His Pile – And Maybe We Will – After a While", "The Softest, Sweetest Air on Earth – Free Hot Air", and "Smile, Smile, Smile. You Don‘t Have to Stay Here But We Do." Hall also began publishing a mimeographed newsletter, The Salome Sun, which he distributed to Laughing Gas' customers. The newsletter contained a variety of tall tales. Among the characters Hall developed on its pages were the Bald Barber, Sheep Dip Jim, Chloride Kate, and the Reptyle Kid. His best known creation was the Salome Frog. The frog was a seven-year old, 18 pounds (8.2 kg) bullfrog that carried a canteen "to water my back and keep it green". It had also never learned to swim due to the lack of waterholes in the desert.

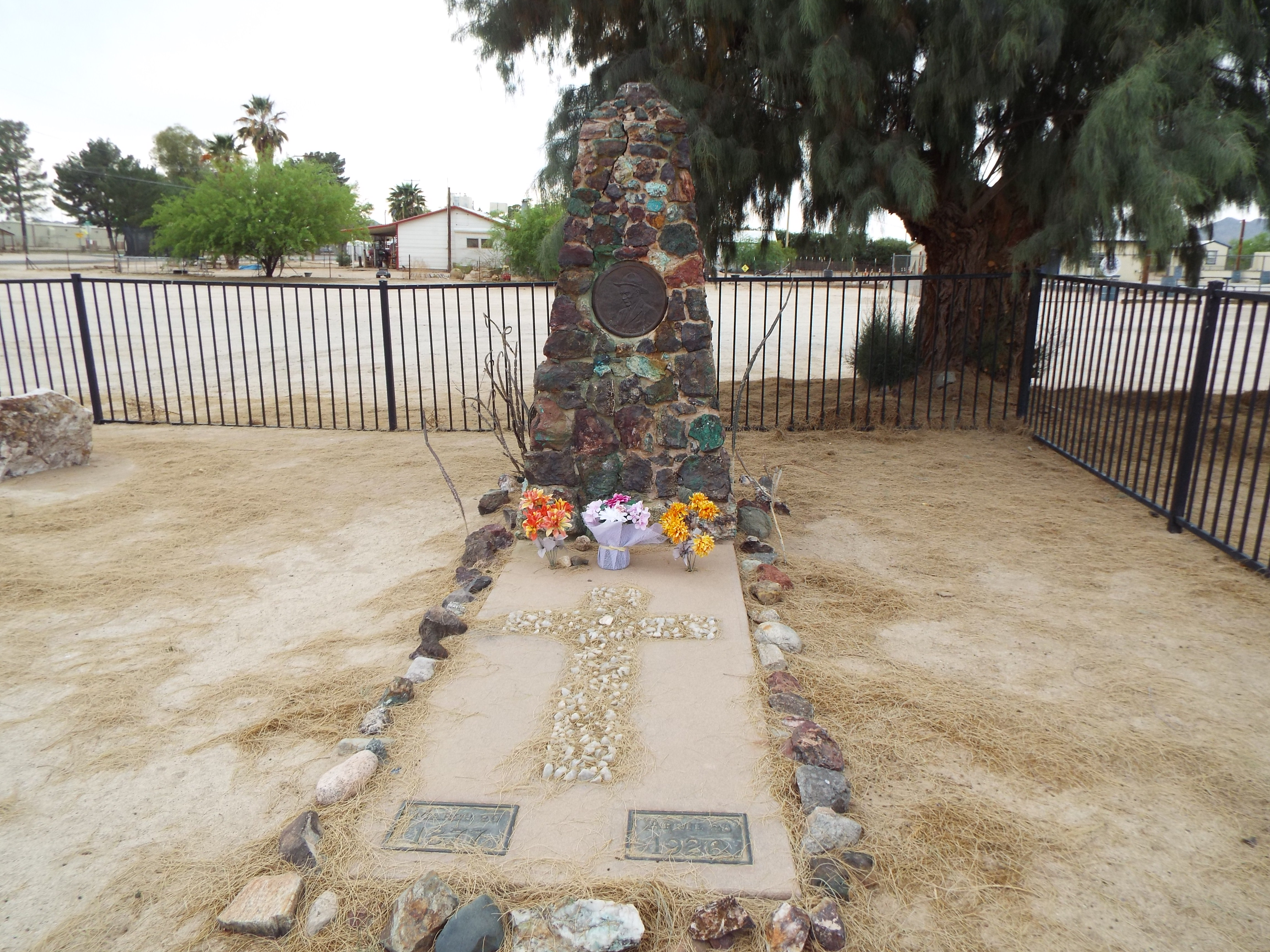
Dick Wick Hall's grave

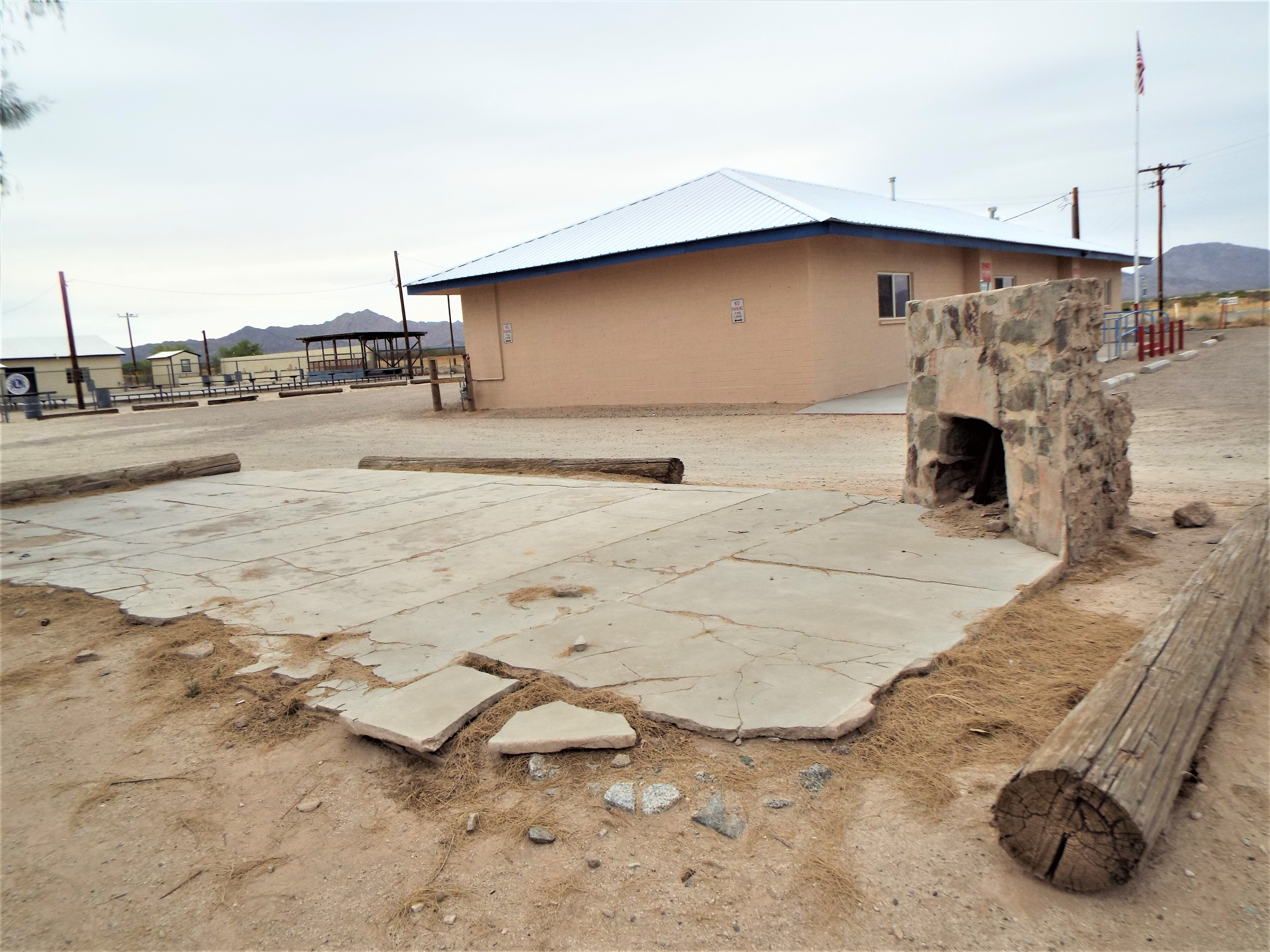
Dick Wick Hall house ruins

The sequence of events which caused the Sun to come to the attention of The Saturday Evening Post is unknown. The magazine did take notice and made Hall a regular contributor from 1920 until his death. Exposure in the Post led to Hall writing for other publications and eventually to a syndicated newspaper column. Back in Salome, Hall added the Blue Rock Inne and the Greasewood Golf Course to his portfolio of businesses. According to Hall, he obtained plans for his golf course from a visitor passing through Salome. By the time he began laying out the course, the plans had been soaked in perspiration and he read "yds" (yards) as "rds" (rods). The resulting Greasewood Course became the largest in the United States at roughly 40 miles (64 km) in total length. When writing about the course, Hall would warn of hazards such as bandits, Gila monsters, jumping cactus, and poison water holes.

In addition to his work as a humorist, Hall became an advocate for better roads in northern Yuma County. Toward this end he lobbied for creation of a paved road from Wickenburg to the Colorado River that passed through Salome. The majority of the counties political power was located in and around Yuma and the voters there saw little reason to spend money on the northern part of the county. Hall, rebuffed in his initial requests for the road, began using his column as a forum to mock "Yumaresque County". Hall's critics claimed his campaign for a new road were self-serving as the additional traffic would bring additional customers to his gas station. The writer countered by pointing out that his writing career offered much greater financial opportunities than the gas station and that he was actually losing money by spending his time and effort advocating for the road.

In early 1926, Hall had signed a contract to become a screenwriter for Universal Studios. While in Los Angeles he visited a dentist for a tooth extraction and left for Salome without any additional treatment. An infection developed and turned into sepsis. Hall died in Los Angeles on April 28, 1926, following a six-week illness. He was at the peak of his fame at the time of his death. Hall was buried in Salome. His grave was marked by a cross composed of nuggets donated by area prospectors while a statue of a large frog with a canteen strapped across its back stands nearby.

The Salome Lions Club hosts an annual "Dick Wick Hall Day" to commemorate the humorist. Moreover, his frog is the inspiration for the Salome High School's mascot.
