= Salome High School =

Public school in La Paz County, Arizona

Location
- 67488 East Salome Road; Salome, La Paz County, Arizona 85348; United States
- Coordinates: 33°46′30″N 113°36′10″W

Information
- School type: Public, high school
- School district: Bicentennial Union High School District #76
- Superintendent: Andrew Kauffman
- CEEB code: 030375
- Teaching staff: 11.00 (FTE)
- Grades: 9–12
- Gender: Co-educational
- Enrollment: 118 (2023–2024)
- Student to teacher ratio: 10.73
- Campus: Rural
- Colors: Green and white
- Athletics conference: AIA 1A – West
- Sports: Boys: baseball, basketball, football, soccer, track & field, volleyball, wrestling Girls: basketball, soccer, softball, track & field, volleyball
- Mascot: Frog
- Accreditation: Cognia
- Communities served: Aguila, Bouse, Cibola, Ehrenberg, Salome, Quartzsite, Wenden, and Vicksburg
- Website: sites.google.com/a/salomehs.org/salome-high-school/

Salome High School is a high school in Salome, Arizona. It is the only school in the Bicentennial Union High School District #76.

== Athletics ==
Salome is a member of the Arizona Interscholastic Association and competes as the Frogs in conference 1A - West in these sports:

- Boys: baseball, basketball, football, soccer, track & field, volleyball, wrestling
- Girls: basketball, soccer, softball, track & field, volleyball.

Arizona state championships

- Basketball (Boys): 1981, 1988
- Football: 1980
- Track & Field (Boys): 1981
- Track & Field (Girls): 1976, 2003
