= Weaver Mountains =

Landform in Yavapai County, Arizona

- Location within Arizona

Highest point
- Peak: Weaver Peak
- Elevation: 6,574 ft (2,004 m)
- Coordinates: 34°19′38″N 112°48′36″W

Dimensions
- Length: 25 mi (40 km) NW-SE
- Width: 12 mi (19 km)

Geography
- Country: United States
- State: Arizona
- Regions: Arizona transition zone and Sonoran Desert
- County: Yavapai
- Settlement: Yarnell
- Range coordinates: 34°13′21″N 112°44′59″W
- Borders on: Bradshaw Mountains, Hassayampa River and Date Creek Mountains

The Weaver Mountains are a smaller mountain range to the southwest of the Bradshaw Mountains in central-west Yavapai County, Arizona. Yarnell, at the summit of the Yarnell Hill, Arizona State Route 89, is at the center of the range.

== Description ==
The range is northwest–southeast trending, but more due east on the east end. The northeast, east, and southeast is separated from the Bradshaw Mountains by the Hassayampa River. A list of peaks in the range, from the northwest are: Ritter Peak, Weaver Peak, Rocky Boy Peak, Antelope Peak, Rich Hill, Weaver Mountain, and Wades Butte. Sam Powell Peak and Seal Mountain border the Hassayampa River. Weaver Peak is about 7 miles (11 km) west of Yarnell. At the west and southwest, Cottonwood Creek and a valley separates the Weaver Mountains from a smaller mountain range to the southwest, the Date Creek Mountains.

== History and attractions ==
The Weaver Mountains are noted for their mines; also placer gold.
