= Bill Williams River National Wildlife Refuge =

Protected area in Arizona, United States

- IUCN category IV (habitat/species management area)
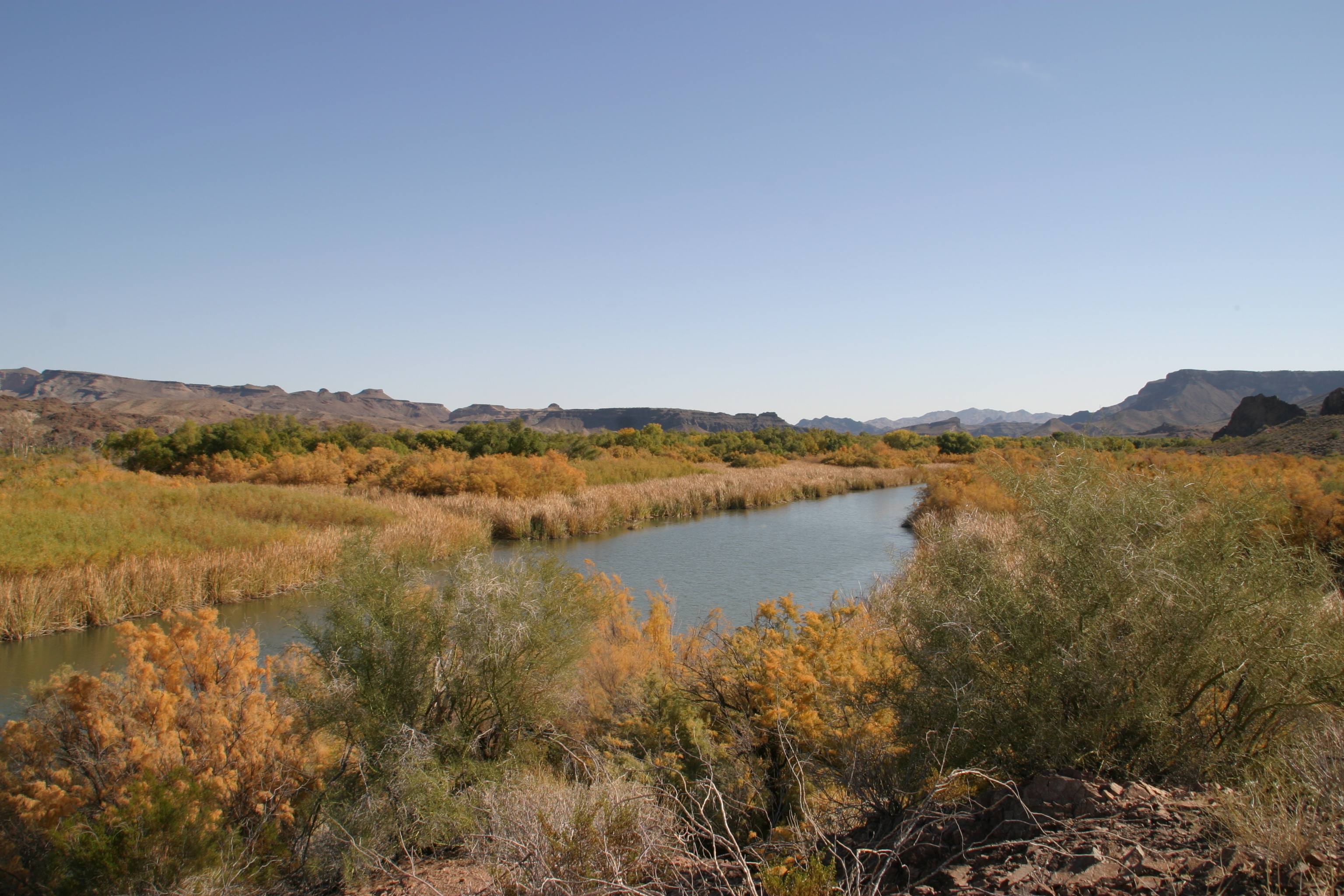

- Location within the United States Location within Arizona
- Location: La Paz / Mohave counties, Arizona, United States
- Nearest city: Parker, AZ / Lake Havasu City, AZ
- Coordinates: 34.269201°N 114.045492°W
- Area: 6,105 acres (24.71 km^{2})
- Established: 1941, 1993 (as Bill Williams)
- Governing body: U.S. Fish and Wildlife Service
- Website: Bill Williams River National Wildlife Refuge

The Bill Williams River National Wildlife Refuge protects the lower course of the Bill Williams River, to its mouth at Lake Havasu reservoir, in western Arizona. It is located within eastern La Paz and Mohave Counties, in the Lower Colorado River Valley region.

The federal wildlife refuge is managed by the United States Fish and Wildlife Service. Recreation activities include nature walks, bird watching, hiking, and kayaking on the Bill Williams River.

The Nature Conservancy acquired the land from the Arizona Ranch and Metals Company in 1977 and donated it to the Fish and Wildlife Service.

== Natural history ==
The habitats of the refuge are a blend of Mojave Desert and Sonoran Desert uplands, desert riparian zones, and marsh wetlands habitats, provides for a diverse array of flora and fauna.

=== Flora ===
The ecosystem within the Bill Williams River National Wildlife Refuge is situated in an ecotone (transition zone) between Mojave Desert and Sonoran Desert ecoregions, increasing diversity of plant species present within it, There are few places in the Arizona deserts where one can view saguaro cacti forests, wetland broadleaf cattail (Typha latifolia) stands, and cottonwood woodlands in a single viewshed.

The refuge protects the largest remaining stand of the cottonwood-willow forests plant community along the lower Colorado River, with Fremont's cottonwood (Populus fremontii) and Goodding's willow (Salix gooddingii) the primary tree species.

=== Fauna ===
The rare desert context riparian habitat of Bill Williams River NWR supports diverse resident fauna, and draws a variety of neotropical migratory birds, from Central and South America en route to their breeding grounds in the north.

The refuge is host to some endangered bird species, including the southwestern willow flycatcher (Empidonax traillii extimus), which nests on the refuge; and the Yuma rail (Rallus obsoletus yumanensis) which lives in the marsh's broadleaf cattail colonies, and is endemic to the Lower Colorado River Valley.

This refuge's wildlife includes:

- Birds: southwestern willow flycatcher, vermilion flycatcher, yellow-billed cuckoo, western tanager, lazuli bunting, Yuma rail
- Mammals: North American beaver, bobcat, cougar, gray fox, collared peccary, mule deer, desert bighorn sheep, ring-tailed cat.
- Amphibians: Colorado River toad (Incilius alvarius)
- Fish: razorback sucker and bonytail chub.

== Friends of the Refuge ==
The Friends of the Bill Williams River and Havasu National Wildlife Refuges is a non-profit membership organization that supports the Bill Williams River National Wildlife Refuge and the Havasu National Wildlife Refuge up on the Colorado River. They advocate for and strive to obtain grants to support refuge projects, conduct fund-raising activities to support environmental education programs, assist refuge staff with several of the refuge's annual events, and help the Fish and Wildlife Service operate and maintain the refuge facilities and programs by providing volunteer labor.

== See also ==
- Category:Natural history of the Lower Colorado River Valley
- Category:Wilderness areas within the Lower Colorado River Valley
