= Aguila Elementary School District =

School district in Arizona, United States

- 50023 N 514th Ave Aguila, Arizona, 85320

District information
- Type: Public
- Grades: PreK–8
- NCES District ID: 0400480

Students and staff
- Students: 137
- Teachers: 9.04
- Staff: 11.4
- Student–teacher ratio: 15.15

Other information
- Website: www.aguilaschool.org

Aguila School District 63 is a public school district based in Maricopa County, Arizona, serving the community of Aguila.
