= List of regions of Arizona =

This is a list of regions of Arizona, United States

Region	Description of Region	Notes
Arizona Strip	Arizona Strip	Mojave Desert
Arizona Sun Corridor	Arizona Sun Corridor	Megaregion extending from Prescott to Nogales
Arizona transition zone	Mogollon Rim and White Mountains (Arizona) in east	the transition zone region (diagonal across Arizona–NW-to-E-central); Colorado Plateau to northeast, lower level deserts of Basin and Range to west-(NW), SW, and south
Borderlands	United States–Mexico border	
Canyon Lands	Monument Valley	the Canyonlands of SE Utah and NE Arizona see: Physiographic regions of the world
Coconino Plateau	Coconino Plateau	
Colorado River	Colorado River	Mojave Desert in North; In south-Sonoran Desert/Colorado Desert(So. Calif.)
Colorado Plateau	Colorado Plateau	
Grand Canyon	Grand Canyon	
Kaibab Plateau	Kaibab Plateau	
Lower Colorado River Valley	Lower Colorado River regions	Regions below Hoover Dam south to the Colorado River Delta(Mexico) see: Category:Lower Colorado River Valley
Madrean sky islands	Madrean sky islands,	Southern Arizona, near Tucson, Nogales, Douglas
Mogollon Plateau	Mogollon Plateau	
Mogollon Rim	Mogollon Rim	
Mojave Desert	Mojave Desert	Mohave County, Arizona and associated areas
Monument Valley	Monument Valley the Canyon Lands	see: Physiographic regions of the world
Navajo Nation	Navajo Nation w/Monument Valley	Northeast Arizona and the Colorado Plateau
Northeast Arizona	Northeast Arizona	
Northern Arizona	Northern Arizona	
Oak Creek Canyon	Oak Creek Canyon bordering on west: Sycamore Canyon	
Phoenix Metropolitan Area	Phoenix Metropolitan Area	see also: Category:Phoenix metropolitan area
San Francisco volcanic field	San Francisco volcanic field	
Sonoran Desert	Mojave Desert, Sonoran Desert	by the Hoover Dam/Lake Mead, (w&nw)(Mojave Desert); Chihuahuan Desert by extreme SE Arizona; All of central, and sw Arizona-lower elevations below Mogollon Rim: part of Sonoran Desert; even the bottom of the Grand Canyon(a lower elevation) would have Sonoran Desert biota/Sonoran influence
Verde Valley	Verde Valley with/ Oak Creek Canyon	
White Mountains (Arizona)	White Mountains (Arizona)	
