= Swansea Wilderness =

Protected area in southern Arizona

- IUCN category Ib (wilderness area)
- Location within the United States
- Location: La Paz County and Mohave County, Arizona, United States
- Nearest city: Parker, AZ
- Coordinates: 34.21607°N 113.860401°W
- Area: 16,400 acres (66 km^{2})
- Established: 1990
- Governing body: U.S. Department of Interior Bureau of Land Management

Swansea Wilderness is a protected wilderness area in the central portion of the Buckskin Mountains divided by a large gorge formed by the Bill Williams River in the U.S. state of Arizona. Established in 1990 under the Arizona Desert Wilderness Act the area is managed by the Bureau of Land Management. The namesake of the area, the ghost town Swansea is located south of the wilderness area.

North of the river, the wilderness area extends into Mohave County onto the Black Mesa, west of the Rawhide Mountains. Elevation ranges from 670 feet (204 m) to 1900 feet (579 m).

== See also ==
- List of Arizona Wilderness Areas
- List of U.S. Wilderness Areas
