= Ranegras Plain =

Landform in La Paz County, Arizona

Coordinates: 33°39′16″N 113°48′38″W

Ranegras Plain is a plain in the eastern part of La Paz County, Arizona.

The Ranegras Plain is bounded by the Eagletail Mountains, Little Harquahala Mountains, Granite Wash Mountains and Bouse Hills to the northeast and to the southeast by the Plomosa, New Water and Little Horn Mountains. Its elevations range between 1,400 feet / 430 meters in the far southeast of the plain, where the Eagletail and Little Horn Mountains meet, to 930 feet / 280 meters in the far northwest, at Bouse, Arizona, where Bouse Wash, (the primary drainage of the plain), leaves the plain between the Plomosa Mountains and Bouse Hills.
