= Gibraltar Mountain Wilderness =

Protected area in La Paz County, Arizona

- IUCN category Ib (wilderness area)
- Location within the United States
- Location: La Paz County, Arizona, USA
- Nearest city: Parker, AZ
- Coordinates: 34°10′3″N 114°5′46″W
- Area: 18,790 acres (76 km^{2})
- Established: 1990
- Governing body: U.S. Department of Interior Bureau of Land Management

Gibraltar Mountain Wilderness is a protected wilderness area on the western edge of the Buckskin Mountains in the U.S. state of Arizona. Established in 1990 under the Arizona Desert Wilderness Act the area is managed by the Bureau of Land Management. This desert wilderness is primarily volcanic tuff crossed with deep canyons and sandy washes.

The namesake peak Gibraltar Mountain rises to an elevation of 1,568 feet (477 m), but is not the high point of the wilderness area. Vegetation in the area includes creosote bush, cholla, barrel cactus, and palo verde that support a small population of desert bighorn sheep.

== See also ==
- List of Arizona Wilderness Areas
- List of U.S. Wilderness Areas
