= East Cactus Plain Wilderness =

Protected area in La Paz County, Arizona

- IUCN category Ib (wilderness area)
- Location within the United States
- Location: La Paz County, Arizona, U.S.
- Nearest city: Parker, Arizona
- Coordinates: 34.0666878°N 113.9438288°W
- Area: 14,630 acres (5,920 ha)
- Designated: 1990
- Governing body: Bureau of Land Management

The East Cactus Plain Wilderness is a 14,630-acre (59.2 km^{2}) wilderness area on the Cactus Plain 10 miles (16 km) north of Bouse, Arizona. It is one of twenty-five wilderness areas located in the Lower Colorado River Valley region, south of Lake Mead–Hoover Dam. It is administered by the Bureau of Land Management.

== See also ==
- List of LCRV Wilderness Areas (Colorado River)
- List of Arizona Wilderness Areas
