= Artillery Mountains =

Landform in Mohave County, Arizona

Coordinates: 34.3677961°N 113.6010425°W

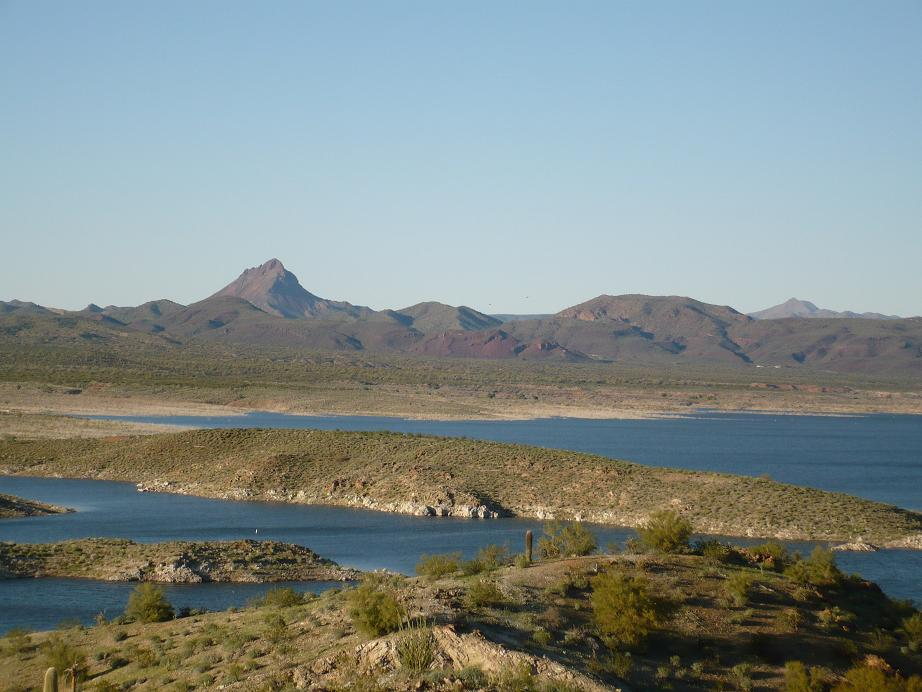
- Artillery Peak above Alamo Lake State Park

Highest point
- Peak: Artillery Peak-(volcanic plug)
- Elevation: 1,200 ft (370 m)

Dimensions
- Length: 12 mi (19 km) NW x E
- Width: 5 mi (8.0 km)

Geography
- Country: United States
- State: Arizona
- Borders on: Big Sandy River–Arrastra Mountain Wilderness-N & E Alamo Lake State Park-S; Rawhide Mountains & Wilderness-SW

The Artillery Mountains are a mountain range in Mohave County in western Arizona. High point of the range is Artillery Peak, 2,917 feet (889 meters) above sea level. Artillery Peak is at coordinates N 34.36946 W 113.58160 .

Mineral resources of the Artillery Mountains include manganese, uranium and gold. Rocher Deboule Minerals drilled their Artillery Mountains Manganese property in 2008, and discovered a resource of 2,553,000 tonnes of 3.82% Mn.

High Desert Gold acquired the Artillery Peak gold project in western Arizona in 2008.

At Uranium Energy's Artillery Peak uranium project, the firm hopes to discover a uranium deposit similar to the nearby Anderson Mine, which has a published reserve of 27 million pounds of uranium, in addition to a uranium resource of 70 million pounds, and another 80 million pounds of vanadium.
