= Bill Williams River =

River in Arizona

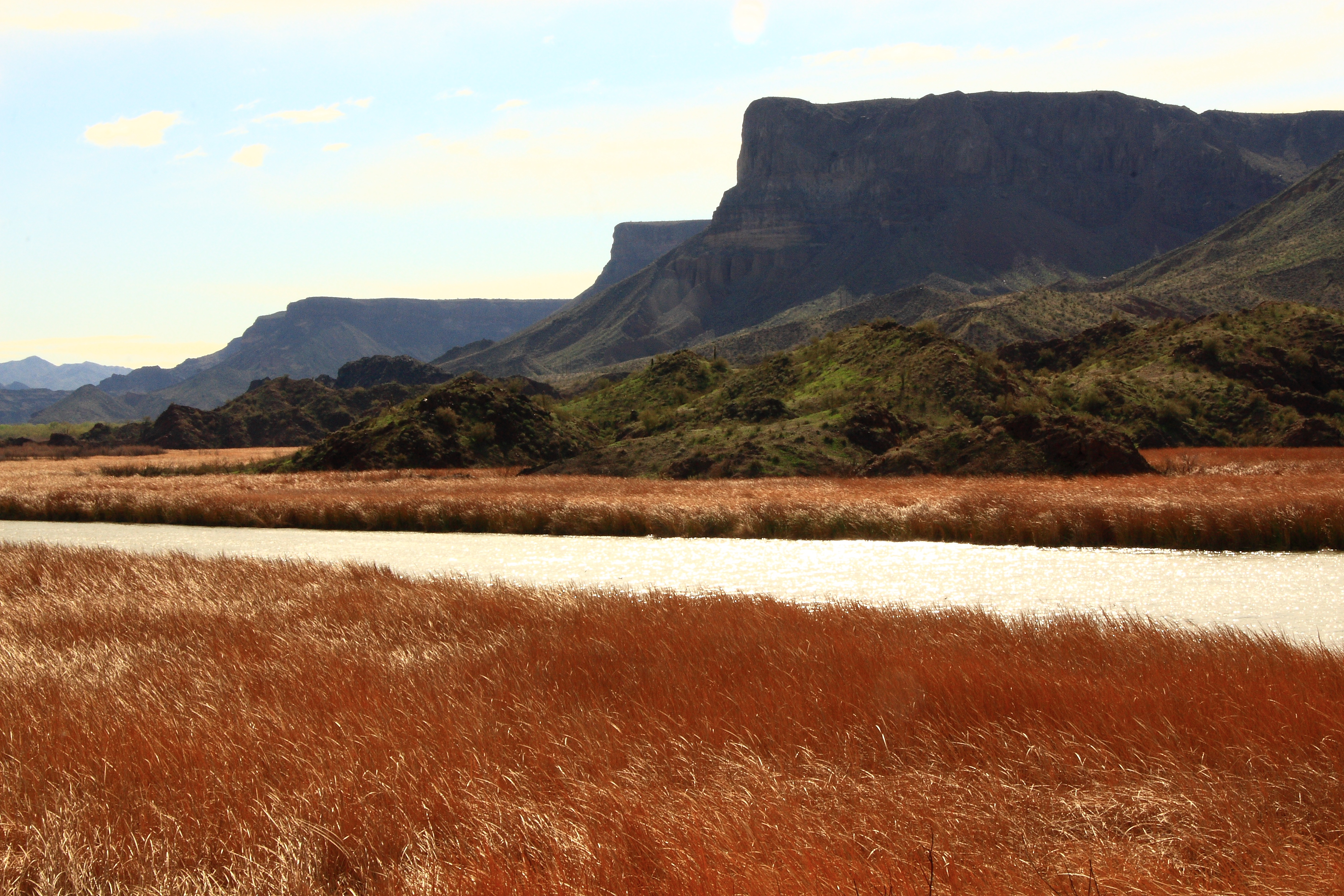
- Near mouth at Lake Havasu

- Location of the mouth of the Bill Williams River in Arizona
- Etymology: William S. Williams, 19th-century preacher and mountain man

Location
- Country: United States
- State: Arizona
- County: Mohave, La Paz

Physical characteristics
- Source: confluence of the Big Sandy and Santa Maria rivers
  - location: Alamo Lake
  - coordinates: 34°18′38″N 113°31′36″W
  - elevation: 1,175 ft (358 m)
- Mouth: Colorado River
  - location: Lake Havasu
  - coordinates: 34°18′16″N 114°08′07″W
  - elevation: 453 ft (138 m)
- Length: 46.3 mi (74.5 km)
- Basin size: 5,373 sq mi (13,920 km^{2})
- Discharge
  - location: mouth
  - average: 140 cu ft/s (4.0 m^{3}/s)
  - maximum: 1,845 cu ft/s (52.2 m^{3}/s)

The Bill Williams River is a 46.3-mile-long (74.5 km) river in west-central Arizona where it, along with one of its tributaries, the Santa Maria River, form the boundary between Mohave County to the north and La Paz County to the south. It is a major drainage westwards into the Colorado River of the Lower Colorado River Valley south of Hoover Dam and Lake Mead, and the drainage basin covers portions of northwest, and west-central Arizona. The equivalent drainage system paralleling the east–west lower reaches of the Bill Williams is the Gila River, which flows east-to-west across central Arizona, joining the Colorado River in the southwest at Yuma. The confluence of the Bill Williams River with the Colorado is north of Parker, and south of Lake Havasu City.

To the north of the river are the Artillery Mountains, the Rawhide Mountains and Bill Williams Mountain. To the south lie the Buckskin Mountains. The old mining camp of Swansea (now a ghost town) lies in the Buckskin Mountains about 3.7 miles (6.0 km) south of the river.

The two tributaries that form the Bill Williams are the Big Sandy River and the Santa Maria River. Alamo Lake, a flood control reservoir, lies just west of the confluence of the two tributaries. The reservoir and state park is a major fishing and recreation region on the river. The confluence of the Bill Williams River with the Colorado River is just north of Parker Dam and the entire riparian environment has state parks and wilderness areas: Buckskin Mountain State Park, Cattail Cove State Park, and the Gibraltar Mountain, Swansea, and Cactus Plain wilderness areas.

The river is named after mountain man Bill Williams.

== Flora and fauna ==
Fish species in the Bill Williams river include largemouth bass, yellow bullhead, green sunfish, bluegill, carp, mosquitofish, red shiner, razorback sucker, and others. The lowland leopard frog, North American river otter, beaver, muskrat, Arizona toad, and spiny-spotted turtle are among the major aquatic vertebrates found in or near the water. Plants in the riparian zones include several kinds of willows as well as bulrushes, and saltcedar. The Bill Williams Wildlife Refuge near Parker is frequented by at least 335 species of birds.

== Nature reserves ==
The city of Scottsdale, Arizona, formerly owned a ranch on the river and planned to export water from it. However, in 2006, Scottsdale sold the ranch & surroundings to the Phelps Dodge mining company, which operated it as a nature reserve, under a government program for companies to restore habitat in one area to balance environmental damage caused elsewhere.

The Bill Williams River National Wildlife Refuge protects the lower course of the river, to its mouth at Lake Havasu reservoir. The Sonoran Desert rare riparian habitat of Bill Williams River NWR draws a variety of Neotropical migratory birds, from Central and South America en route to their breeding grounds in the north. It has one of the last stands of the natural Cottonwood-Willow Forests plant community along the lower Colorado River, with Fremont's cottonwood (Populus fremontii) and Goodding's willow (Salix gooddingii) the primary tree species.

== See also ==
- List of rivers of Arizona

== Works cited ==
- Benke, Arthur C., ed., and Cushing, Colbert E., ed.; Blinn, Dean W. and Poff, N. Leroy (2005). "Chapter 11: Colorado River Basin" in Rivers of North America. Burlington, Massachusetts: Elsevier Academic Press. ISBN 0-12-088253-1. OCLC 59003378.
