= Arizona State Route 71 =

State highway in Arizona, United States

State Route 71
- SR 71 highlighted in red

Route information
- Maintained by ADOT
- Length: 24.16 mi (38.88 km)
- Existed: 1936–present

Major junctions
- South end: US 60 in Aguila
- Future I-11 / US 93 in Congress
- North end: SR 89 in Congress

Location
- Country: United States
- State: Arizona
- Counties: Maricopa, Yavapai

Highway system
- Arizona State Highway System; Interstate; US; State; Scenic Proposed; Former
← US 70	→ SR 72

State Route 71 (or SR 71) is a state highway in central Arizona that stretches between its northeast terminus at its junction with State Route 89 at Congress and its southwest terminus at its junction with U.S. Route 60 at Aguila. It primarily serves as a shortcut between Prescott and the major roads going to California as there are no towns located on the route other than at the ends of the highway.

== Route description ==
The route begins at U.S. Route 60 just east of the city of Aguila. The road bends slightly northeastward before heading straight north, with fields on the west side of the road. After crossing from Maricopa County into Yavapai County, SR 71 then heads northeastward into a desert area, continuing for several miles in a straight direction through the Mojave Desert. While heading northeast, the route meets U.S. Route 93, at the diamond interchange forming the intersection called the Joshua Tree Forest Parkway of Arizona. SR 71 then enters into the town of Congress, which is littered with several small houses. The route ends at an at-grade intersection with Arizona State Route 89.

== History ==
State Route 71
- Location: Safford to Eagar
- Existed: 1927–1936

The current road was originally designated a state route in 1936.

Prior to 1934, the SR 71 designation was given to a road from US 180 near Safford to US 60 in Eagar. This previous incarnation of SR 71 had existed since 1927 and was part of the original state highway system introduced by the Arizona State Highway Commission on 9 September 1927. SR 71 was absorbed into SR 81 in 1934 and subsequently SR 81 became an extension of US 666 (now US 191).

== Junction list ==
County	Location	mi	km	Destinations	Notes
Maricopa	Aguila	0.00	0.00	US 60 – Wickenburg, Phoenix, Los Angeles	Western terminus
Yavapai	Congress	17.46	28.10	Future I-11 / US 93 – Kingman, Wickenburg	Interchange
Yavapai	Congress	24.16	38.88	SR 89 – Prescott, Wickenburg	Eastern terminus
1.000 mi = 1.609 km; 1.000 km = 0.621 mi

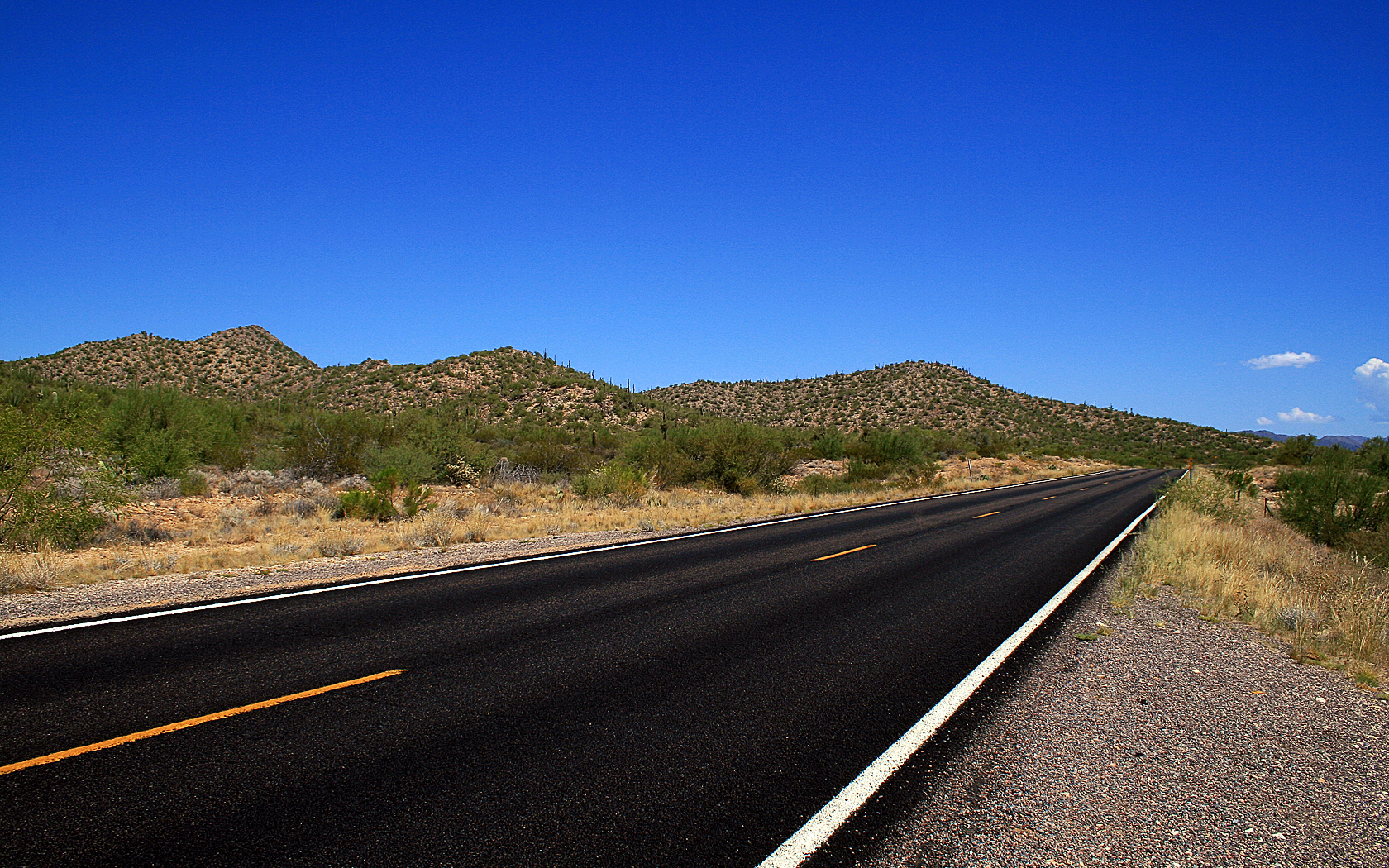
North East View of Arizona State Route 71 - 34° 6' 11.28" N 112° 59' 44.11" W

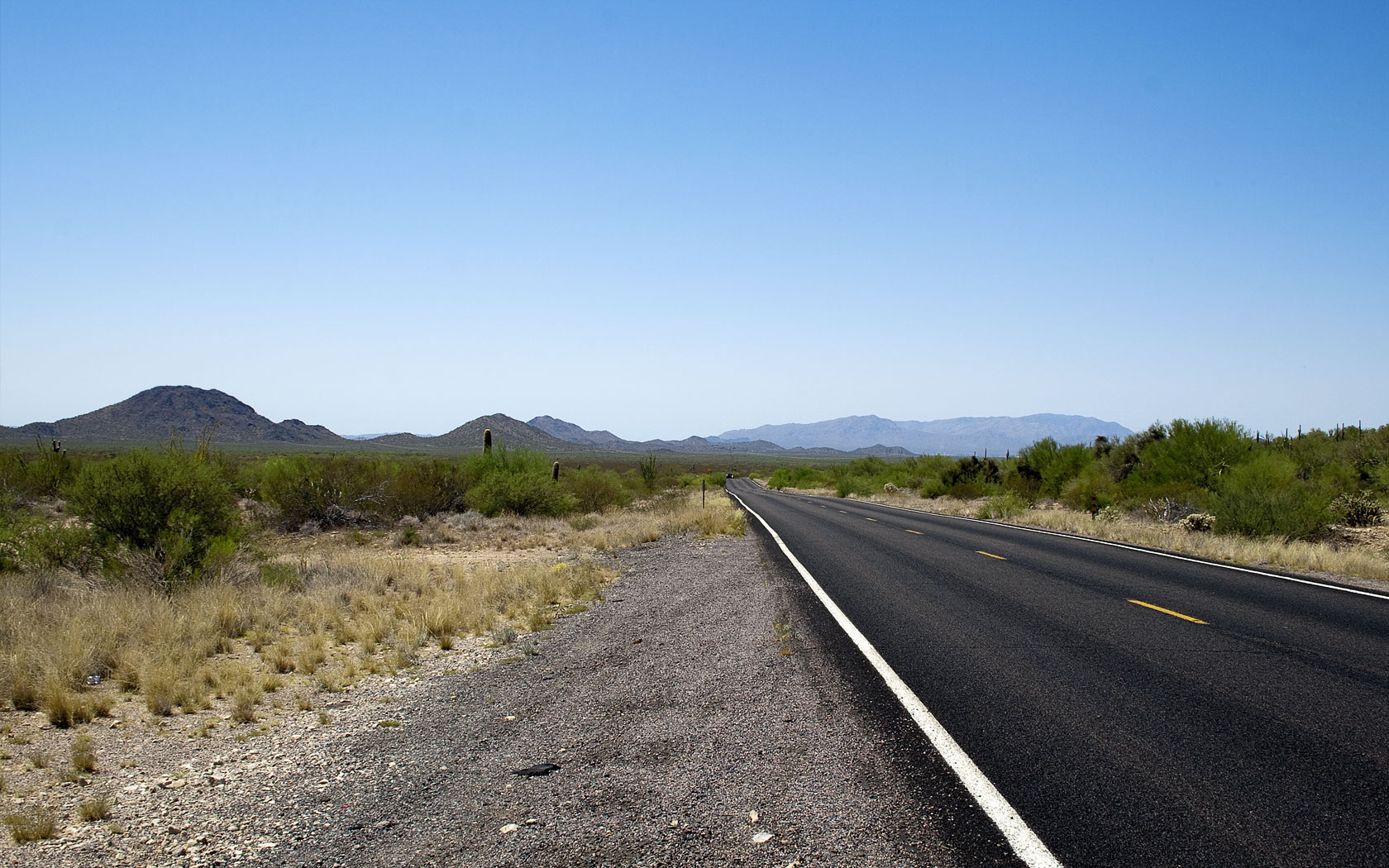
South West View of Arizona State Route 71 - 34° 6' 11.28" N 112° 59' 44.11" W
