= Centennial Wash (Maricopa County) =

Waterway in Arizona

Coordinates: 33.3937325°N 113.1256281°W

Centennial Wash is an ephemeral dry wash that forms the final watershed of the Gila River in central Arizona – before the river turns south. From the Centennial Wash confluence, the Gila turns south, then southwest to exit Arizona on the California border adjacent Yuma.

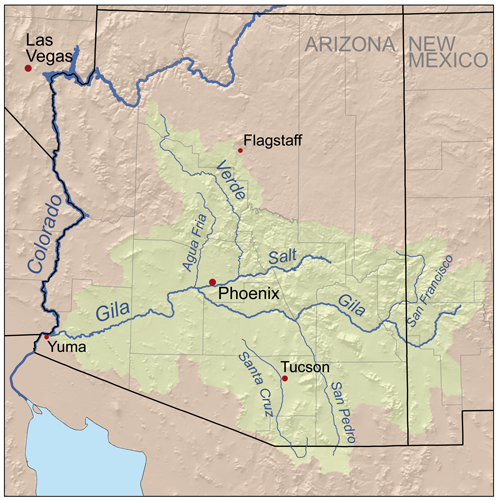
The Gila River drainage of Arizona. The Salt River(at Phoenix)-Verde River co-join as one major northern tributary, part of the drainage for the central and western Mogollon Rim. Centennial Wash enters from the northwest as the river corkscrews south and west, around the Gila Bend Mountains.

The Centennial Wash drainage is adjacent to the south-flowing Hassayampa River Drainage on the east; the next drainage east is the Agua Fria Drainage (as shown on map). To the south as the Gila River makes its turns, arriving at the Painted Rock Reservoir, the Hassayampa and Centennial Wash drainages abut the Lower Gila–Painted Rock Reservoir Drainage.

== See also ==
- Bouse Wash
- List of rivers of Arizona
