= Salome, Arizona =

CDP in La Paz County, Arizona

- Census-designated place
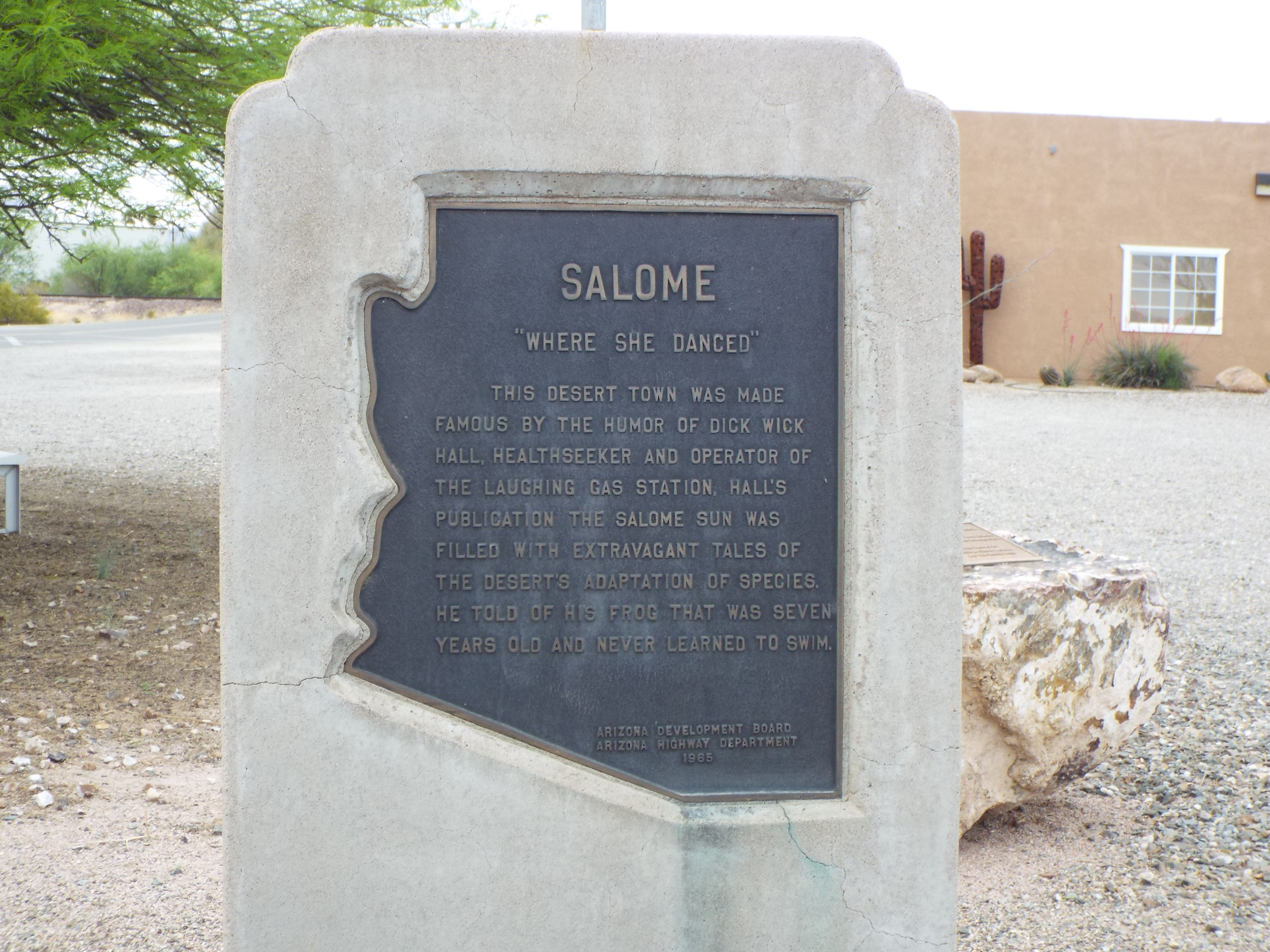
- Salome Marker

- Location in La Paz County and the state of Arizona

- Location in the United States
- Coordinates: 33°45′49″N 113°36′31″W
- Country: United States
- State: Arizona
- County: La Paz
- Established: 1904

Area
  - Total: 33.32 sq mi (86.31 km^{2})
  - Land: 33.32 sq mi (86.31 km^{2})
  - Water: 0 sq mi (0.00 km^{2})
- Elevation: 1,847 ft (563 m)

Population (2020)
  - Total: 1,162
  - Density: 34.9/sq mi (13.46/km^{2})
- Time zone: UTC-7 (MST (no DST))
- ZIP code: 85348
- Area code: 928
- FIPS code: 04-62700
- GNIS feature ID: 2409240

Salome (locally /səˈloʊm/, Tolkepaya Yavapai: Wiltaika) is an unincorporated community and census-designated place (CDP) in La Paz County, Arizona, United States. The population was 1,162 at the 2020 census. It was established in 1904 by Dick Wick Hall, Ernest Hall and Charles Pratt, and was named after Pratt's wife, Grace Salome Pratt.

== Geography ==
Salome is located in eastern La Paz County at 33°45′49″N 113°36′31″W (33.763728, -113.608555). U.S. Route 60 runs through the community, leading east 54 miles (87 km) to Wickenburg and west 25 miles (40 km) to Interstate 10 between Brenda and Quartzsite. The Salome Road runs southeast to Hassayampa and Buckeye.

According to the United States Census Bureau, the Salome CDP has a total area of 33.3 square miles (86.3 km^{2}), all land.

Southwest of central Salome is Harcuvar, (Mohave name implying 'there is little sweet water') which has a Kampgrounds of America and RV park.

== Demographics ==
Historical population
Census	Pop.	Note	%±
2000	1,690		—
2010	1,530		−9.5%
2020	1,162		−24.1%
U.S. Decennial Census

=== 2020 census ===
As of the 2020 census, Salome had a population of 1,162. The median age was 68.1 years. 9.6% of residents were under the age of 18 and 58.4% of residents were 65 years of age or older. For every 100 females there were 104.6 males, and for every 100 females age 18 and over there were 105.9 males age 18 and over.

0.0% of residents lived in urban areas, while 100.0% lived in rural areas.

There were 597 households in Salome, of which 10.7% had children under the age of 18 living in them. Of all households, 50.3% were married-couple households, 24.0% were households with a male householder and no spouse or partner present, and 18.6% were households with a female householder and no spouse or partner present. About 33.2% of all households were made up of individuals and 23.5% had someone living alone who was 65 years of age or older.

There were 991 housing units, of which 39.8% were vacant. The homeowner vacancy rate was 3.3% and the rental vacancy rate was 11.9%.

Racial composition as of the 2020 census
Race	Number	Percent
White	944	81.2%
Black or African American	2	0.2%
American Indian and Alaska Native	10	0.9%
Asian	12	1.0%
Native Hawaiian and Other Pacific Islander	16	1.4%
Some other race	90	7.7%
Two or more races	88	7.6%
Hispanic or Latino (of any race)	186	16.0%

=== 2000 census ===
As of the 2000 census, there were 1,690 people, 780 households, and 502 families residing in the CDP. The population density was 61.6 inhabitants per square mile (23.8/km^{2}). There were 1,176 housing units at an average density of 42.9 per square mile (16.6/km^{2}). The racial makeup of the CDP was 91.1% White, 0.3% Black or African American, 2.7% Native American, 0.3% Asian, 0.2% Pacific Islander, 3.1% from other races, and 2.3% from two or more races. 18.5% of the population were Hispanic or Latino of any race.

There were 780 households, out of which 16.3% had children under the age of 18 living with them, 57.4% were married couples living together, 3.5% had a female householder with no husband present, and 35.6% were non-families. 28.3% of all households were made up of individuals, and 15.6% had someone living alone who was 65 years of age or older. The average household size was 2.2 and the average family size was 2.6.

In the CDP, the population was spread out, with 17.3% under the age of 18, 3.6% from 18 to 24, 15.9% from 25 to 44, 29.3% from 45 to 64, and 33.8% who were 65 years of age or older. The median age was 57 years. For every 100 females, there were 109.4 males. For every 100 females age 18 and over, there were 109.8 males.

The median income for a household in the CDP was $22,866, and the median income for a family was $24,805. Males had a median income of $23,500 versus $21,786 for females. The per capita income for the CDP was $12,872. About 16.7% of families and 23.3% of the population were below the poverty line, including 32.4% of those under age 18 and 16.1% of those age 65 or over.

== Education ==
Salome is served by the Salome Elementary School District and the Bicentennial Union High School District.

== Infrastructure ==
The Salome Water Company serves Salome.

== Notable person ==
- Dick Wick Hall, humorist and writer
