= Buckskin Mountain State Park =

Park located near Parker, Arizona

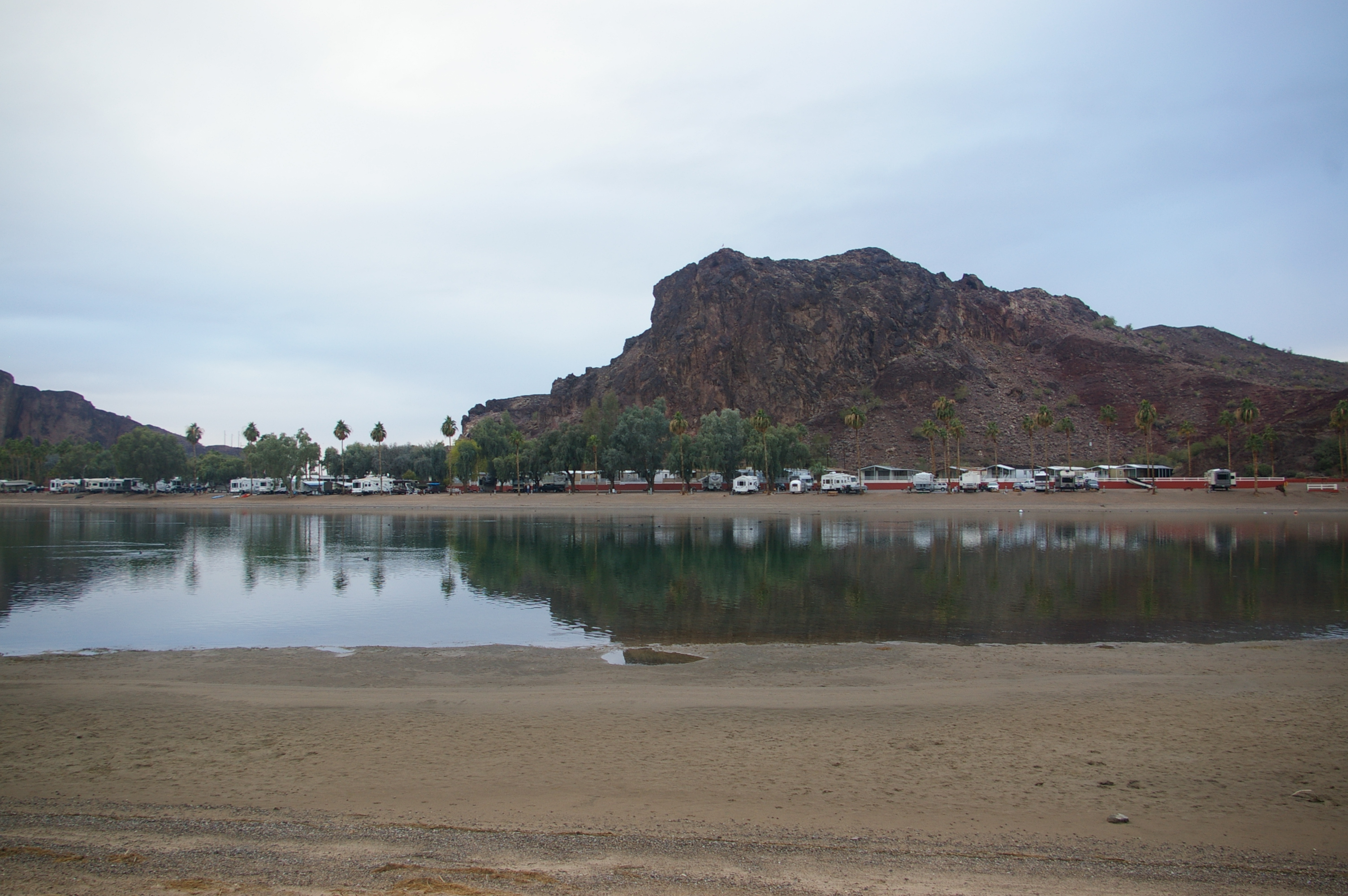

- Location within Arizona
- Interactive map of Buckskin Mountain State Park
- Location: La Paz County, Arizona, United States
- Coordinates: 34°15′15″N 114°09′39″W
- Area: 1,677 acres (679 ha)
- Elevation: 420 ft (130 m)
- Established: 1967
- Administrator: Arizona State Parks & Trails
- Visitors: 41,701 (in 2024)
- Website: Official website

Buckskin Mountain State Park is a public recreation area located near Parker, Arizona, United States. A second developed area of the state park is known as the River Island Unit or River Island State Park. Both park areas have shoreline on the Colorado River and views of the Buckskin Mountains. The park provides camping and water recreation opportunities.
