= Cactus Plain =

Landform in La Paz County, Arizona

Coordinates: 34.047°N 114.080°W

Cactus Plain is a plain east of the Colorado River and Parker Valley, in La Paz County, western Arizona, United States.

== Geography ==
Cactus Plain is a landform within the Lower Colorado River Valley. It is adjacent to Bouse Wash, which is on the south. The wash drains northwest-west into the Colorado River.

=== Protected areas ===
Recreation activities in both protected areas includes backpacking, day hiking, sightseeing, horseback riding, photography, and botanical and wildlife study.

==== Cactus Plain Wilderness Study Area ====
The 59,100 acres (23,900 ha) Cactus Plain Wilderness Study Area protects the western two-thirds of the Cactus Plain, managed by the Bureau of Land Management (BLM). It is 15 miles (24 km) southeast of Parker, and 3 miles (4.8 km) north of Bouse.

The wilderness study area is an immense open area of stabilized and semi-stabilized sand dunes, unique in western Arizona. Recreation activities include backpacking, day hiking, sightseeing, horseback riding, and botanical and wildlife study.

==== East Cactus Plain Wilderness ====
The 14,630 acres (5,920 ha) East Cactus Plain Wilderness area protects the eastern third of the Cactus Plain, managed by the BLM. It is 10 miles (16 km) 3 miles (4.8 km) north of Bouse.

It is predominantly a complex crescent dune, with dense dune–scrub vegetation, known only from this area in Arizona. The plant community is unique in its denseness and flora species diversity.

== See also ==
- List of LCRV Wilderness Areas (Colorado River)
- Protected areas of La Paz County, Arizona
