= Harquahala Mountains =

Landform in southwestern Arizona, US

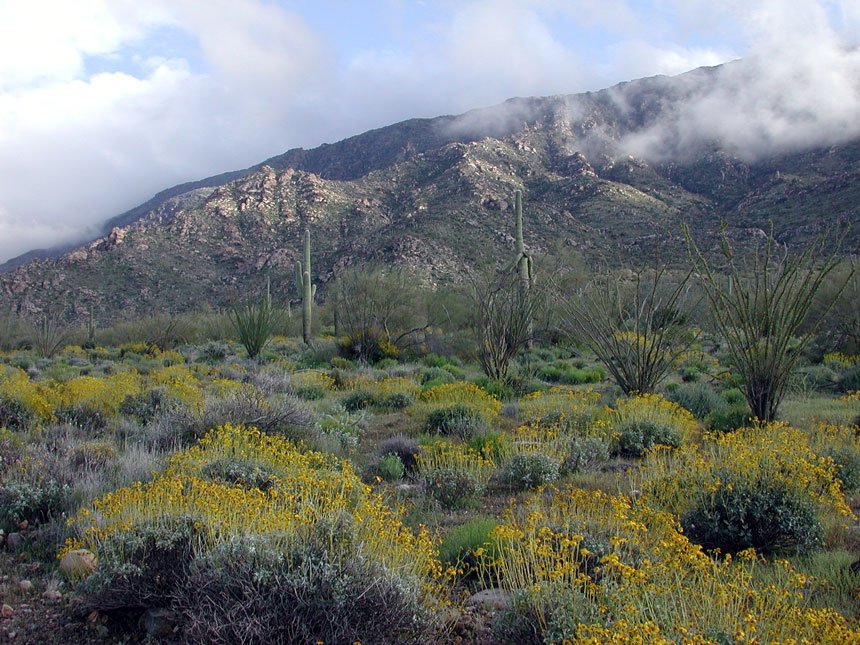
- Harquahala Mountains viewed from north side following an unusually wet spring. The bright yellow shrubs are brittlebush (Encelia farinosa).

Highest point
- Peak: Harquahala Peak
- Elevation: 5,681 ft (1,732 m)
- Prominence: 3,461 ft (1,055 m)

Dimensions
- Length: 32 km (20 mi) NE-SW
- Width: 20 km (12 mi)

Geography
- Range coordinates: 33°49′N 113°19′W

The Harquahala Mountains (Yavapai: ʼHakhe:la) are the highest mountain range in southwestern Arizona, United States and are located southwest of the towns of Aguila and Wenden. The name originated from the Yavapai 'ʼHakhe:la", which means "running water". The range is oriented from northeast to southwest and is approximately 32 km long and 20 km at its widest point. At the northeast are two prominent peaks, Eagle Eye Peak and Eagle Eye Mountain. One has a natural opening or bridge through it appearing as an eye high up, and is the namesake for the peaks and Aguila (Spanish for eagle). The highest point, Harquahala Peak, rises to 5,681 ft (1,732 m). Socorro Peak, 3270 ft (1,134 m), is at the southwest end of the range.

The very windy summit can be reached via a rough, 4-wheel drive road. This high point was used by the U.S. Army in the 1880s as a heliograph station. Then in 1920 a Smithsonian Astrophysical Observatory was constructed on this summit and operated for five years before being relocated to Table Mountain Observatory, near Wrightwood, California. Its purpose was to study variations in the solar output as a possible factor in climate prediction.

Designated in 1990, the 22,880-acre (93 km^{2}) the Harquahala Mountain Wilderness lies to the north and east of the summit at 33°49′40″N 113°17′52″W on the Maricopa / La Paz county line.

At the southwest end of the mountain range, there are gypsum mines and in the past there were extensive mines for gold and silver.

== See also ==
- List of mountain ranges of Arizona
- List of Arizona Wilderness Areas
