= Alamo Lake State Park =

State park in Arizona, United States

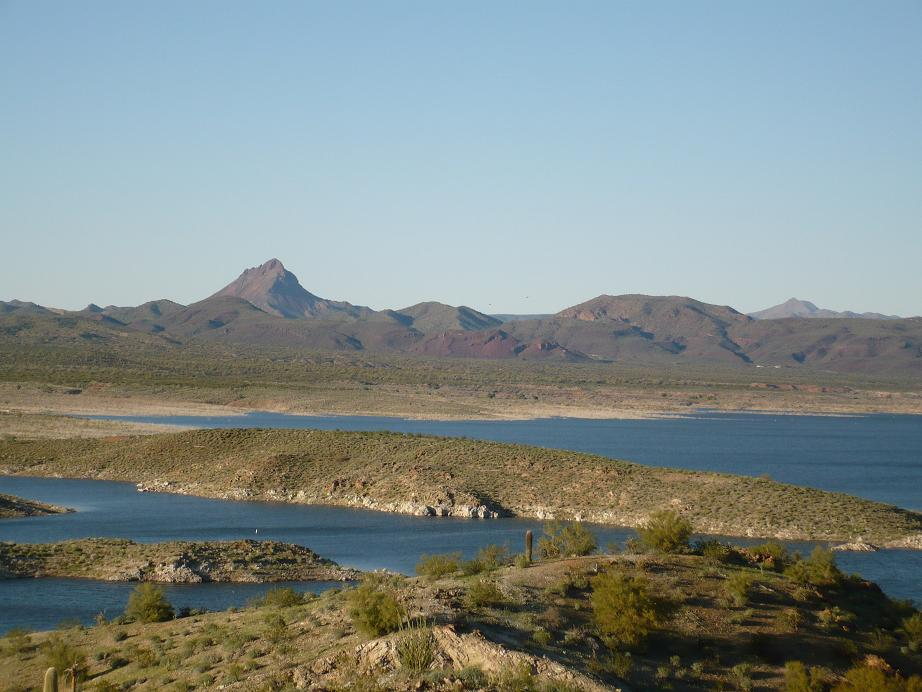
- Alamo Lake and Artillery Peak

- Location within Arizona
- Location: La Paz County, Arizona, United States
- Coordinates: 34°13′56″N 113°36′10″W
- Area: 4,900 acres (2,000 ha)
- Elevation: 1,300 ft (400 m)
- Established: 1969
- Administrator: Arizona State Parks & Trails
- Visitors: 55,090 (in 2024)
- Logo
- Website: azstateparks.com/alamo-lake

Alamo Lake
- Location within Arizona
- Location: La Paz / Mohave counties, Arizona
- Coordinates: 34°13′56″N 113°36′10″W
- Type: reservoir
- Primary inflows: Bill Williams River
- Primary outflows: Bill Williams River, evaporation
- Basin countries: United States
- Max. depth: 80 ft (24 m)
- Surface elevation: 1,237 ft (377 m)

Alamo Lake State Park is a state park of Arizona, United States, centered on Alamo Lake, a flood control and recreational reservoir. The park is located in western Arizona about 38 miles (61 km) north of Wenden. It is accessed via a paved two-lane road off either U.S. Route 60 to the south or U.S. Route 93 to the east. Owing to its remoteness, the park is often considered one of the "best kept secrets" of the state park system.

Alamo Lake State Park features camping facilities and attracts wildlife enthusiasts, as the park is home to numerous wildlife species including the bald eagle. The park's remoteness and distance from cities also makes it a destination for stargazing, as it is the darkest sky state park in Arizona.

== Alamo Lake ==
Alamo Lake itself is formed by the Alamo Dam that is part of the Alamo Lake State Park administered by the Arizona State Parks. The lake impounds runoff from the Bill Williams River, an intermittent tributary of the Colorado River. The dam was constructed in 1968 by the Army Corps of Engineers, primarily for flood control purposes. The dam is an earthfill dam that rises 283 feet (86 m) from the streambed.

While the Bill Williams River is often dry, heavy seasonal rains maintain the lake's depth. During extreme flood events, the reservoir can fill rapidly; the lake has been recorded to rise 11 feet (3.4 m) in a single night due to extreme flooding.

Unusually high flows during the 1970s and 1980s increased the depth and size of the reservoir to unexpected levels, giving birth to recreational and fishing possibilities. Since then, the lake has been stocked with numerous fish species, including largemouth bass, crappie, sunfish, channel catfish, flathead catfish and tilapia. The lake is host to fishing tournaments and has been the location of at least one Arizona state fishing record.

The park can be accessed by a paved road from Highway 60 at the Wenden turn-off to the north on Alamo Lake Road.

== Climate ==
According to the Köppen Climate Classification system, Alamo Lake State Park has a hot desert climate, abbreviated "BWh" on climate maps. The hottest temperature recorded in Alamo Lake State Park was 124 °F (51.1 °C) on July 29, 1995, while the coldest temperature recorded was 19 °F (−7.2 °C) on December 26, 1990, January 15, 2007, January 4–5, 2019, and January 22, 2023.

Climate data for Alamo Dam, Arizona, 1991–2020 normals, extremes 1975–present
Month	Jan	Feb	Mar	Apr	May	Jun	Jul	Aug	Sep	Oct	Nov	Dec	Year
Record high °F (°C)	84 (29)	90 (32)	102 (39)	107 (42)	114 (46)	123 (51)	124 (51)	121 (49)	118 (48)	110 (43)	98 (37)	84 (29)	124 (51)
Mean maximum °F (°C)	76.4 (24.7)	81.9 (27.7)	90.6 (32.6)	100.4 (38.0)	107.3 (41.8)	114.4 (45.8)	117.1 (47.3)	115.7 (46.5)	111.2 (44.0)	102.9 (39.4)	89.3 (31.8)	76.6 (24.8)	118.3 (47.9)
Mean daily maximum °F (°C)	65.6 (18.7)	70.1 (21.2)	77.2 (25.1)	85.0 (29.4)	94.3 (34.6)	104.6 (40.3)	108.1 (42.3)	106.8 (41.6)	101.3 (38.5)	89.6 (32.0)	75.8 (24.3)	64.5 (18.1)	86.9 (30.5)
Daily mean °F (°C)	48.8 (9.3)	52.9 (11.6)	59.3 (15.2)	66.6 (19.2)	75.7 (24.3)	84.9 (29.4)	90.8 (32.7)	89.6 (32.0)	82.9 (28.3)	70.5 (21.4)	57.7 (14.3)	48.0 (8.9)	69.0 (20.6)
Mean daily minimum °F (°C)	31.9 (−0.1)	35.6 (2.0)	41.4 (5.2)	48.3 (9.1)	57.1 (13.9)	65.2 (18.4)	73.5 (23.1)	72.5 (22.5)	64.4 (18.0)	51.3 (10.7)	39.5 (4.2)	31.4 (−0.3)	51.0 (10.6)
Mean minimum °F (°C)	26.8 (−2.9)	30.3 (−0.9)	34.9 (1.6)	41.0 (5.0)	49.0 (9.4)	57.4 (14.1)	66.8 (19.3)	66.5 (19.2)	56.3 (13.5)	43.9 (6.6)	33.0 (0.6)	26.1 (−3.3)	24.5 (−4.2)
Record low °F (°C)	19 (−7)	21 (−6)	26 (−3)	32 (0)	33 (1)	43 (6)	58 (14)	59 (15)	37 (3)	29 (−2)	25 (−4)	19 (−7)	19 (−7)
Average precipitation inches (mm)	1.03 (26)	1.13 (29)	0.77 (20)	0.24 (6.1)	0.08 (2.0)	0.06 (1.5)	0.82 (21)	1.18 (30)	0.74 (19)	0.55 (14)	0.56 (14)	0.66 (17)	7.82 (199.6)
Average precipitation days (≥ 0.01 in)	4.0	4.2	3.4	1.5	0.7	0.3	2.9	4.9	2.5	2.0	1.8	3.2	31.4
Source 1: NOAA
Source 2: National Weather Service
