= Bouse Wash =

Dry wash in La Paz County, Arizona

Coordinates: 33.8296°N 113.9471°W

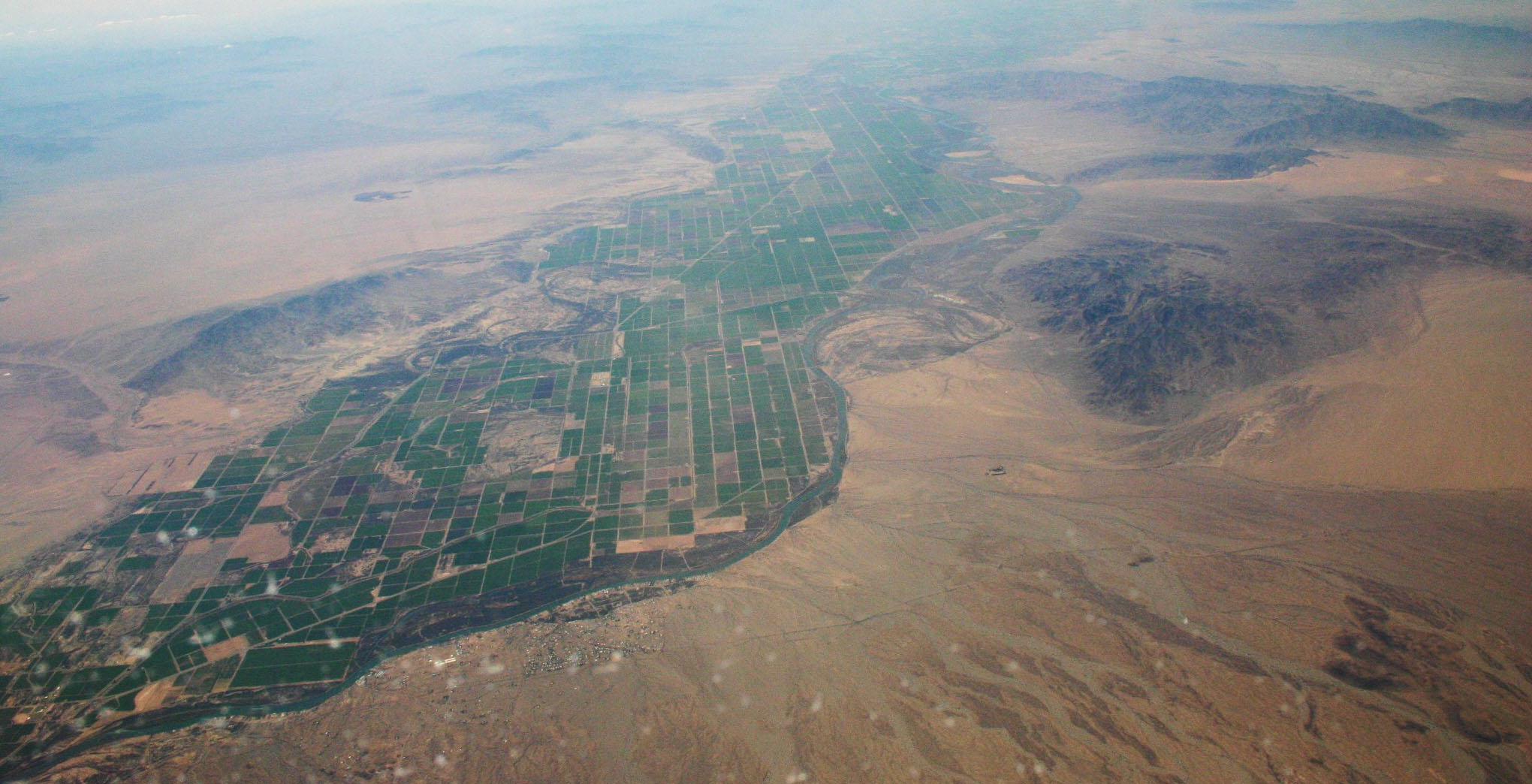
(view south) (photo left border) The Bouse Wash entering the Parker Valley from east. The wash skirts the north end of the dark black, short (in height & length), and mildly arced Mesquite Mountains (Arizona).

Bouse Wash is one of the larger eastern-bank dry washes that enter the Colorado River in the Lower Colorado River Valley. It is located in La Paz County, extreme western Arizona.

== Geography ==
Bouse Wash is located on the north rim of the La Posa Plain and the south rim of Cactus Plain.

The Arizona town of Bouse is on Bouse Wash, northeast of the La Posa Plain, between the Bouse Hills and the Plomosa Mountains.

=== Watersheds ===
Bouse Wash drains into the Colorado River at the north end of the Colorado River Indian Reservation, south of Parker. The Tyson Wash mouth is at the southern end of the reservation. The Bouse Watershed abuts the Tyson Watershed. The Bouse and Tyson Wash river mouths are both on the eastern shore of the Colorado River.

The Bouse Wash Watershed is west of a water divide that the Centennial Wash Watershed flows east from. Centennial is a tributary of the Gila River. Its confluence with the Gila is downstream from the confluence of the Hassayampa River, which flows south from Prescott and drains the western and southwestern regions of the Bradshaw Mountains.
