= Aguila, Arizona =

CDP in Maricopa County, Arizona

- Census-designated place
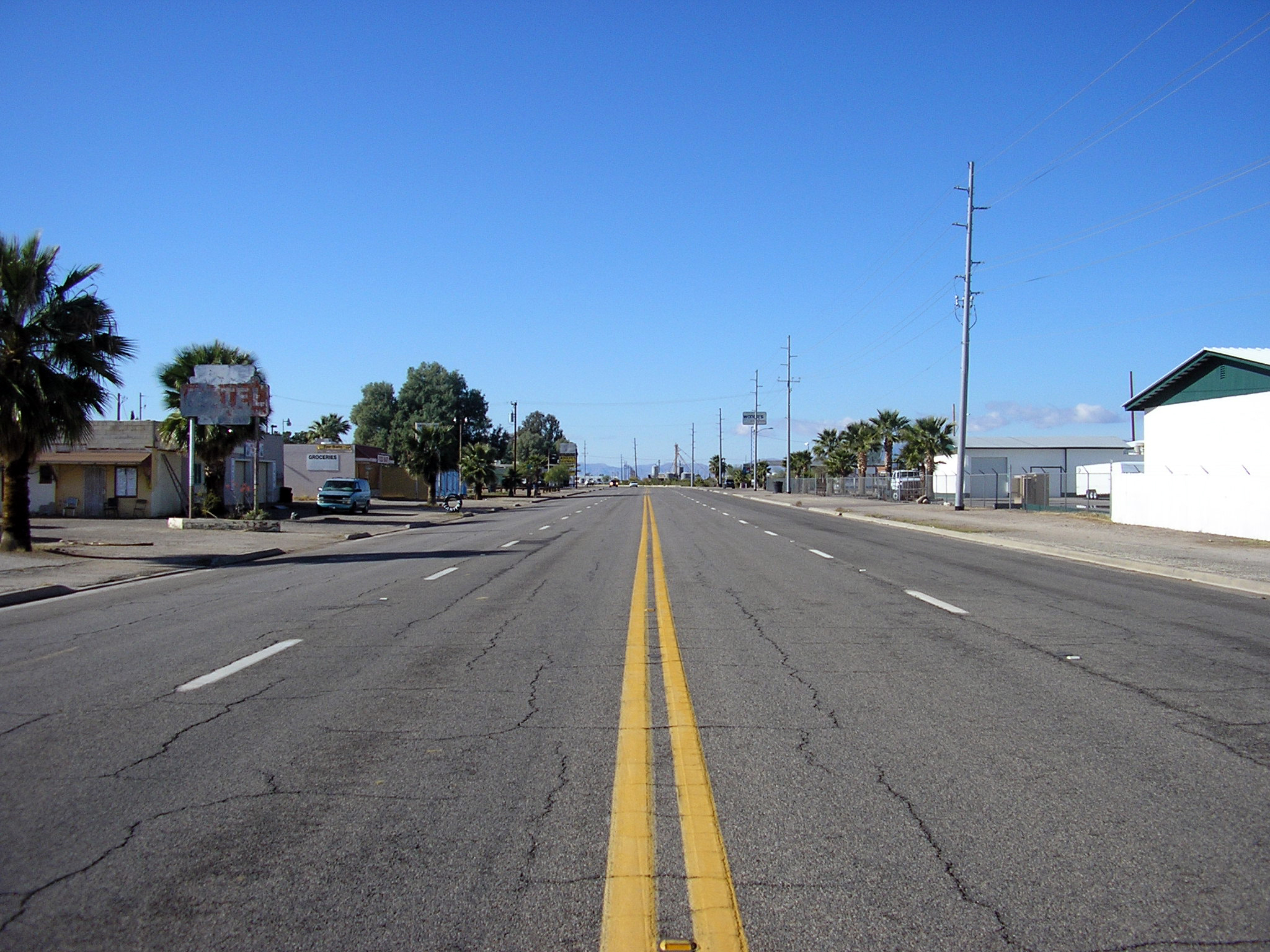
- Aguila in 2012, looking west on U.S. Route 60

- Location in Maricopa County, Arizona

- Location within Arizona Location within the United States
- Coordinates: 33°56′15″N 113°09′59″W
- Country: United States
- State: Arizona
- County: Maricopa

Area
  - Total: 1.63 sq mi (4.22 km^{2})
  - Land: 1.63 sq mi (4.22 km^{2})
  - Water: 0 sq mi (0.00 km^{2})
- Elevation: 2,175 ft (663 m)

Population (2020)
  - Total: 565
  - Density: 346.4/sq mi (133.76/km^{2})
- Time zone: UTC−7 (Mountain (MST))
- ZIP Code: 85320
- Area code: 928
- FIPS code: 04-00730
- GNIS feature ID: 2582720

Aguila is an unincorporated community and census-designated place (CDP) in Maricopa County, Arizona, United States. It is located on U.S. Route 60, 25 miles (40 km) west of Wickenburg and 22 miles (35 km) northeast of Wenden. Major economic activities include cantaloupe farming and formerly included mining. It uses the same street numbering system as Phoenix. As of the 2020 census, the population of Aguila was 565, down from 798 in 2010.

== History ==
Aguila was a stop on the Santa Fe, Prescott and Phoenix Railway. The former 1907 Aguila railroad depot is now located at the McCormick-Stillman Railroad Park in Scottsdale.

== Demographics ==
Historical population
Census	Pop.	Note	%±
1920	174		—
1930	528		203.4%
2010	798		—
2020	565		−29.2%

Aguila CDP, Arizona – Racial composition Note: the US Census treats Hispanic/Latino as an ethnic category. This table excludes Latinos from the racial categories and assigns them to a separate category. Hispanics/Latinos may be of any race.
Race (NH = Non-Hispanic)	% 2020	% 2010	Pop 2020	Pop 2010
White alone (NH)	14.7%	26.7%	83	213
Black alone (NH)	0.4%	0.9%	2	7
American Indian alone (NH)	0.9%	1.9%	5	15
Asian alone (NH)	1.2%	0%	7	0
Pacific Islander alone (NH)	0%	0.3%	0	2
Other race alone (NH)	0%	0.1%	0	1
Multiracial (NH)	1.2%	0.8%	7	6
Hispanic/Latino (any race)	81.6%	69.4%	461	554

Aguila first appeared on the 1920 U.S. Census as the 52nd Precinct of Maricopa County. In 1930, it simply appeared as the Aguila Precinct. It was recorded as having a Spanish/Hispanic majority for that census (the census would not separately feature that racial demographic again until 1980). Its population was 25 in 1940. and 120 in the 1960 census.

In 2010, it was made a census-designated place (CDP).

As of the census of 2010, there were 798 people living in Aguila. The population density was 508.1 people per square mile. The racial makeup was 64.7% White, 1.0% Black or African American, 3.6% Native American, 0.4% Asian, 0.3% Pacific Islander, 28.1% from other races, and 2.0% from two or more races. 69.4% of the population were Hispanic or Latino of any race.

== Climate ==
This area has a large amount of sunshine year round due to its stable descending air and high pressure. According to the Köppen Climate Classification system, Aguila has a desert climate, abbreviated "BWh" on climate maps.

Climate data for Aguila
Month	Jan	Feb	Mar	Apr	May	Jun	Jul	Aug	Sep	Oct	Nov	Dec	Year
Mean daily maximum °F (°C)	62.4 (16.9)	65.8 (18.8)	70.9 (21.6)	80.2 (26.8)	88.9 (31.6)	98.8 (37.1)	102.6 (39.2)	100.4 (38.0)	95.3 (35.2)	85 (29)	71.7 (22.1)	63.7 (17.6)	82.1 (27.8)
Mean daily minimum °F (°C)	33.1 (0.6)	35.7 (2.1)	38.9 (3.8)	44.5 (6.9)	51.8 (11.0)	60.6 (15.9)	70.2 (21.2)	69.7 (20.9)	62.4 (16.9)	50.3 (10.2)	38.5 (3.6)	33.3 (0.7)	49.1 (9.5)
Average precipitation inches (cm)	1 (2.5)	1.1 (2.8)	0.9 (2.3)	0.4 (1.0)	0.1 (0.25)	0.1 (0.25)	0.9 (2.3)	1.4 (3.6)	0.7 (1.8)	0.5 (1.3)	0.6 (1.5)	1 (2.5)	8.7 (22)
Source: Weatherbase

== Education ==
It is in the Aguila Elementary School District.
