= List of mountain ranges of the Lower Colorado River Valley =

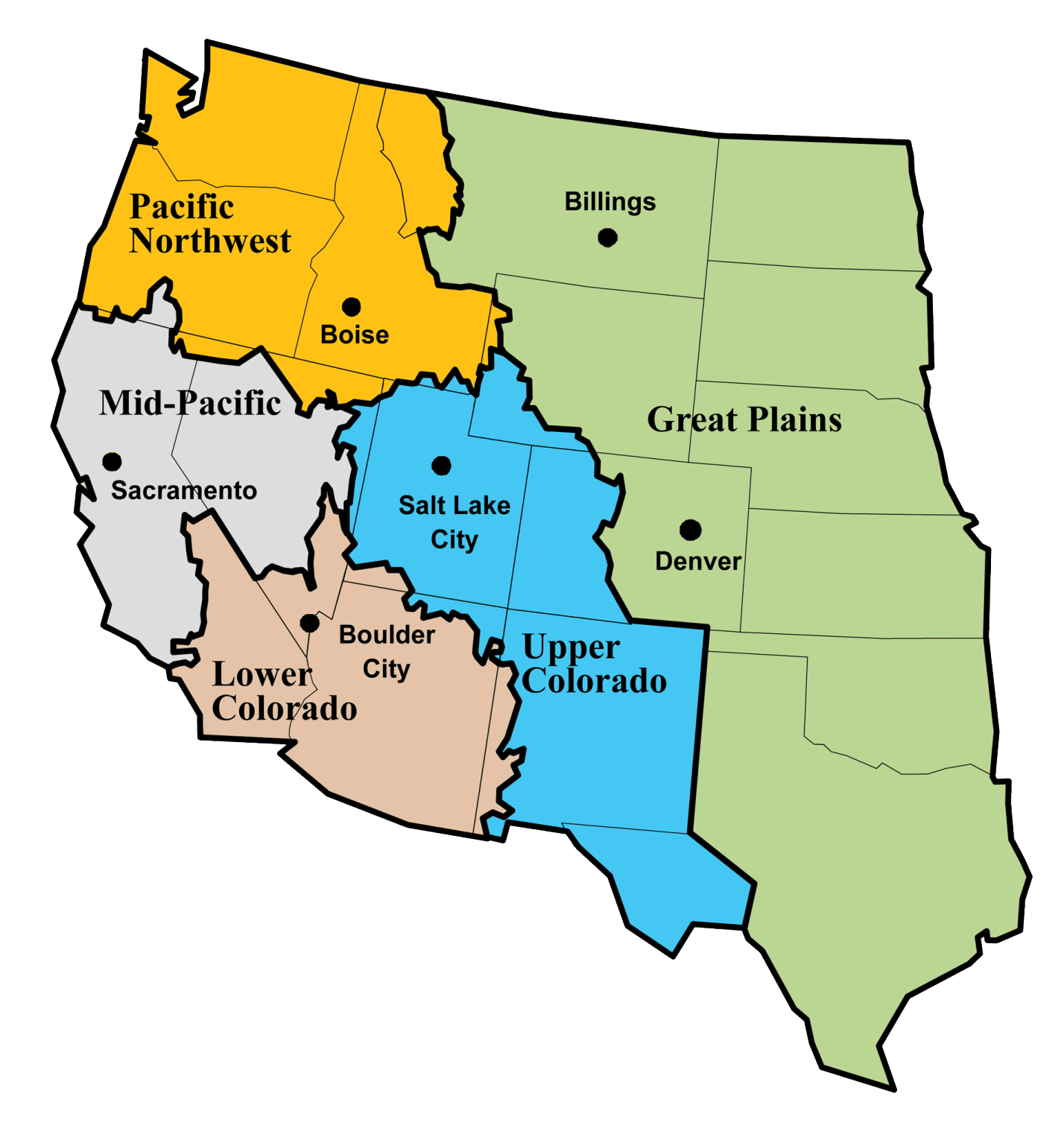
Bureau of Reclamation regions

This is a List of mountain ranges of the Lower Colorado River Valley, located in the western part of the southwestern United States; the eastern region would be the Rio Grande Valley of New Mexico, Texas, and northern Mexico.

This doubled list has the North–South running Colorado River sectioned into the west side of the river vs. the east side. The east side of the Colorado River is represented by the states of Arizona-Sonora, Mexico. The west side of the river is represented by southern Nevada, southeast Low Desert California, and a portion of northwestern Mexico, represented by the state of Baja California-(the North).

== West-bank, East-bank mountain ranges ==
The numbered Mountain ranges abut the Colorado River proper or are associated with valleys or plains, and are somewhat arbitrary. (Though the river flows north to south, a few ranges are East–West, or Northwest–Southeast, per the original Basin and Range faulting.)

- West Bank–Colorado Riv.
- ..
  - Mojave Desert
- (Boulder City, Nevada)
- 1–Eldorado Mountains–Nevada
- El Dorado Canyon, (Nelson, Nev.)
- 2–Newberry Mountains (Nevada)
- Pyramid Canyon
- 3–Dead Mountains
- 4–Sacramento Mountains (California)
- 5–Piute Range–Calif/Nevada
  - Lanfair Valley, Piute Range–Calif/Nevada
- New York Mountains-(Mojave National Preserve)–Calif/Nevada
- ..
- Turtle Mountains4–Sacramento Mountains (California)
  - Chemehuevi Valley
- 6–Chemehuevi Mountains
  - Chemehuevi Valley
- Turtle Mountains,7–-Whipple Mountains
  - Mojave Desert
  - Colorado Desert
- Turtle Mountains,8.5–Nopah Range-Vidal Valley
- ..
- 9–Riverside Mountains
- Sand dunes,--Rice Valley
- Big Maria Mountains
- Little Maria Mountains, 10–Big Maria Mountains
- 11–McCoy Mountains
- Palo Verde Valley
- 12–Mule Mountains (California)
- ..
- ..
- 13–Chuckwalla Mountains
- 14–Chocolate Mountains
- ...
- ..
  - 15–Imperial Dam Long Term Visitor Area=Senator Wash Hills
  - Algodones Dunes
- 16–Cargo Muchacho Mountains
- 17–Pilot Knob (Imperial County, California)
- Colorado Desert–W. Sonoran Des.
- ..
- West Bank–Colorado Riv.
- East Bank–Colorado Riv.
  - Mojave Desert
- Lake Mead
- Black Mtns: Mount Wilson (5445 ft)
- Detrital Plain, White Hills
- 1–Black Mountains, Cerbat Mountains
  - Black Canyon of the Colorado
  - Sacramento Valley
- 2–Black Mesa (western Arizona), Hualapai Mountains-(Hualapai Mountain)
- Mohave Valley, 2.5–Black Mesa (western Arizona)
- 3–Mohave Mountains
  - Dutch Flat
- Dutch Flat, McCracken Mountains, Poachie Range
- Aubrey Hills
  - Bill Williams Mountains
- Rawhide Mountains
  - Bill Williams River
  - and the Big Sandy River (Arizona)-(Kingman, Arizona)
- 4–Buckskin Mountains (Arizona)
  - Buckskin Mountain State Park
  - Cactus Plain
  - Sonoran Desert
- La Posa Plain, Plomosa Mountains
- 5–Dome Rock Mountains, Harcuvar Mountains
- Kofa Mountains
- Castle Dome Mountains
- 6–Trigo Mountains, Chocolate Mountains (Arizona)
  - Castle Dome Plain
- United States Army Yuma Proving Ground
- Laguna Mountains (Arizona)7–Muggins Mountains
  - Gila River
- Laguna Mountains (Arizona)
  - Yuma Desert
- 8–Gila Mountains, Tinajas Altas Mountains, Lechuguilla Desert
  - Sonoran Desert
  - Reserva de la Biosfera el Pinacate y Gran Desierto de Altar
- East Bank–Colorado Riv.

The western route parallelling the Colorado River, covers more plains, of the Colorado Desert/Mojave Desert, rising to, and down from various mountain passes, (for example south of Needles, California (the Sacramento Mountains (California)), or Searchlight, Nevada). Only washes drain from the west into the Colorado River.

== Alphabetical lists: West, East ==
- NEVADA
- Eldorado Mountains
- New York Mountains
- Newberry Mountains (Nevada)
- Piute Range
- CALIFORNIA
- Big Maria Mountains
  - Little Maria Mountains
- Cargo Muchacho Mountains
- Chemehuevi Mountains
- Chocolate Mountains
- Chuckwalla Mountains
- Dead Mountains
- Little Maria Mountains
  - Big Maria Mountains
- McCoy Mountains
- Mule Mountains (California)
- New York Mountains
- Nopah Range
- Pilot Knob (Imperial County, California)
- Riverside Mountains
- Sacramento Mountains (California)
- Turtle Mountains (California)
- Whipple Mountains
- ARIZONA
- Black Mesa (western Arizona)–(south portion of Black Mountains)
- Black Mountains (Arizona)
- Buckskin Mountains (Arizona)
- Castle Dome Mountains
- Cerbat Mountains
- Chocolate Mountains (Arizona)
- Dome Rock Mountains
- Harcuvar Mountains
- Hualapai Mountains-(Hualapai Mountain)
- Kofa Mountains
- Laguna Mountains (Arizona)
- McCracken Mountains
- Mohave Mountains
- Muggins Mountains
- Plomosa Mountains
- Poachie Range
- Rawhide Mountains
- Tinajas Altas Mountains
- Trigo Mountains
- White Hills (Arizona)

== See also ==
- Mountain ranges of the Lower Colorado River Valley index
- Mountain ranges of the Mojave Desert
- Mountain ranges of the Colorado Desert
- List of mountain ranges of the Sonoran Desert
- List of regions of the United States
- List of mountain ranges of Arizona
- List of mountain ranges of California
- List of mountain ranges of Nevada
- List of Arizona state parks
- List of Wildlife Refuges of the LCRV
