= List of mountain ranges of the Sonoran Desert =

A List of mountain ranges of the Sonoran Desert. Many of the mountains of southern Arizona are included, excluding the Madrean Sky Island ranges of southeast Arizona, extreme southwest New Mexico, or northeast Sonora, Mexico.

The Mojave Desert lies to the northwest; also in the northwest and west are mountain ranges of the lower elevation Colorado Desert, (west of the north–south section of the Colorado River of the Lower Colorado River Valley, in the southeast California deserts.)

Mountain ranges on the Baja California Peninsula east of the cordillera spine mountains are included. The middle section of the peninsula is the Vizcaino Desert; a few ranges are from the very south in Baja California Sur.

== Alphabetical list ==
- Agua Caliente Mountains
- Aguila Mountains
- Belmont Mountains
- Big Horn Mountains (Arizona)
- Big Maria Mountains
  - Little Maria Mountains
- Bryan Mountains
- Buckskin Mountains (Arizona)
- Bradshaw Mountains
- Cabeza Prieta Mountains
- Cargo Muchacho Mountains
- Castle Dome Mountains
- Chocolate Mountains
- Chocolate Mountains (Arizona)
- Chuckwalla Mountains
- Copper Mountains
- Crater Range
- Dome Rock Mountains
- Eagletail Mountains
- Gila Bend Mountains
- Gila Mountains (Yuma County)
- Goldfield Mountains
- Granite Wash Mountains
- Harcuvar Mountains–NE. La Paz County -- (SW. Yavapai County)
- Harquahala Mountains–E. La Paz County -- (W. Maricopa County)
  - Little Harquahala Mountains
- Hieroglyphic Mountains–Maricopa County -- (some in S. Yavapai County)
- Kofa Mountains–N. Yuma County - (S. La Paz County)
- Laguna Mountains (Arizona)–Yuma County (see also: Laguna Mountains(Calif))
- Little Buckskin Mountains
- Little Harquahala Mountains
  - Harquahala Mountains
- ( Little Horn Mountains–S. La Paz County -- (N. Yuma County) )
- Little Maria Mountains
- Little Mule Mountains
  - Mule Mountains (California)
  - Big Maria Mountains
- Maricopa Mountains
- ( Mazatzal Mountains–Southeast Yavapai County -- (and N. Maricopa, W. Gila County) )
- McCoy Mountains
- McDowell Mountains
- Middle Mountains–S. La Paz County -- (N. Yuma County)
- Mohawk Mountains
- Muggins Mountains
- Mule Mountains (California)
  - Little Mule Mountains
- New Water Mountains–S. La Paz County -- (connected to Kofa Mountains, N. Yuma County)
- Nopah Range
- Painted Rock Mountains
- Palomas Mountains
- Plomosa Mountains
- Phoenix Mountains
- Riverside Mountains
- Sand Tank Mountains
- Salt River Mountains
- Sierra Arida
- Sierra de la Lechuguilla
- Sierra Estrella
- Sierra Pinta
- Silver Bell Mountains
  - West Silver Bell Mountains
- Tank Mountains
- Tinajas Altas Mountains
- Trigo Mountains
- Tule Mountains
- Turtle Mountains (California)-(borders the Mojave Desert)
- Usery Mountains–Maricopa County -- (See: Usery Mountain Recreation Area.)
- Vulture Mountains
- Waterman Mountains
- West Silver Bell Mountains
  - Silver Bell Mountains
- Whipple Mountains-(borders the Mojave Desert)
- White Tank Mountains

== Colorado Desert, southeast Lower California ==
- Big Maria Mountains
- Cargo Muchacho Mountains
- Chocolate Mountains
- Chuckwalla Mountains
- Little Maria Mountains
- Little Mule Mountains
- McCoy Mountains
- Mule Mountains (California)
- Nopah Range
- Riverside Mountains
- Turtle Mountains (California)-(borders the Mojave Desert)
- Whipple Mountains-(borders the Mojave Desert)

== Mountain ranges of the United States ==
=== La Paz County, Arizona ===
The mostly east–west flowing Bill Williams River forms the northern border of La Paz County, Arizona with Mohave County to the north. This is an approximate delimiting line between the Mojave Desert north and northwest, and to the Sonoran Desert to the south, east, and southeast. The Colorado Desert-(subsection of the Sonoran) lies across the Colorado River to the west, but intergrades into the higher elevation Mojave Desert northwestwards.

- Buckskin Mountains (Arizona)
- Chocolate Mountains (Arizona)
- Dome Rock Mountains
- Granite Wash Mountains
- Harcuvar Mountains–NE. La Paz County -- (SW. Yavapai County)
- Harquahala Mountains–E. La Paz County -- (W. Maricopa County)
- (Kofa Mountains–N. Yuma County - (S. La Paz County) )
- Little Buckskin Mountains
- Little Harquahala Mountains
- ( Little Horn Mountains–S. La Paz County -- (N. Yuma County) )
- Middle Mountains–S. La Paz County -- (N. Yuma County)
- New Water Mountains
- Plomosa Mountains
- Trigo Mountains

=== Maricopa County, Arizona ===
- Belmont Mountains
- Big Horn Mountains (Arizona)
- Crater Range
- Eagletail Mountains
- Gila Bend Mountains
- Goldfield Mountains
- ( Harquahala Mountains–E. La Paz County -- (W. Maricopa County) )
- Hieroglyphic Mountains–Maricopa County -- (some in S. Yavapai County)
- Maricopa Mountains
- ( Mazatzal Mountains–Southeast Yavapai County -- (and N. Maricopa, W. Gila County) )
- McDowell Mountains
- Painted Rock Mountains
- Phoenix Mountains
- Sand Tank Mountains
- Sierra Estrella
- Salt River Mountains
- Usery Mountains–Maricopa County -- (See: Usery Mountain Recreation Area.)
- Vulture Mountains
- White Tank Mountains

=== Pima County, Arizona ===
- Agua Dulce Mountains
- Ajo Range–Pima County
  - Little Ajo Mountains
- Alvarez Mountains
- Artesa Mountains
- Baboquivari Mountains (Arizona)–Pima County; See: Baboquivari Peak Wilderness
- Batamote Mountains
- Bates Mountains
- Brownell Mountains
- Castle Mountains (Arizona)
- Cerro Colorado Mountains( 4207 )
  (on eastern border of Sonoran Desert region)
- Cimarron Mountains
- Coyote Mountains (Arizona)
- Crooked Mountains
- Diablo Mountains (Arizona)
- Empire Mountains
- Gakolik Mountains
- Granite Mountains (Arizona)–Pima County–see also: Granite Mountain (Arizona)-(Yavapai County)
  a separate "Granite Mountain" is in s. La Paz County
- Growler Mountains
- John the Baptist Mountains
- La Lesna Mountains
- Las Guijas Mountains
- Little Ajo Mountains
  - Ajo Range
- Mesquite Mountains
- North Comobabi Mountains
- Pozo Redondo Mountains
- Puerto Blanco Mountains
- Quijotoa Mountains
- Quinlan Mountains( 5014 )
  (on eastern border of Sonoran Desert region-(northern extension of Baboquivari Mountains))
- Roskruge Mountains
- San Luis Mountains( 5369 )
  (on eastern border of Sonoran Desert region)
- Santa Rosa Mountains (Arizona)
- Sauceda Mountains
- Sheridan Mountains
- Sierra Blanca Mountains
- Sierra de la Nariz
- Sierra de Santa Rosa
- Sierrita Mountains
- Sikort Chuapo Mountains
- Silver Bell Mountains
  - West Silver Bell Mountains
- Sonoyta Mountains
- South Comobabi Mountains
- Tortolita Mountains( 4652 )
  (both in Madrean sky island region, and also on border of Sonoran Desert ranges-(northeast Madrean))
- Tucson Mountains
- Waterman Mountains
- West Silver Bell Mountains
  - Silver Bell Mountains

On Eastern border of Sonoran Desert-(Madrean Sky Island)

- Baboquivari Mountains (Arizona)( 7730 )Pima County; See: Baboquivari Peak Wilderness
  (on eastern border of Sonoran Desert region-(separated from the major groups of mountains by the Altar Valley)

=== Pinal County, Arizona ===
- Mineral Mountains, Arizona
- Sacaton Mountains (Arizona)
- Tortolita Mountains( 4652 )
- West Silver Bell Mountains

=== Yavapai County, Arizona ===
- Bradshaw Mountains
- Harcuvar Mountains
- Hieroglyphic Mountains–Maricopa County -- (some in S. Yavapai County)

=== Yuma County, Arizona ===
- Agua Caliente Mountains
- Aguila Mountains
- Bryan Mountains
- Butler Mountains
- Cabeza Prieta Mountains
- Castle Dome Mountains
- Copper Mountains
- Gila Mountains (Yuma County)
- Kofa Mountains–N. Yuma County - (S. La Paz County)
- Laguna Mountains (Arizona)–Yuma County (see also: Laguna Mountains(Calif))
- ( Little Horn Mountains–S. La Paz County -- (N. Yuma County) )
- Middle Mountains–S. La Paz County -- (N. Yuma County)
- Mohawk Mountains
- Muggins Mountains
- ( New Water Mountains–S. La Paz County -- (connected to Kofa Mountains, N. Yuma County) )
- Palomas Mountains
- Sierra Arida
- Sierra de la Lechuguilla
- Sierra Pinta
- Tank Mountains
- Tinajas Altas Mountains
- Tule Mountains

== See also ==
- List of Madrean Sky Island mountain ranges - Sonoran - Chihuahuan Deserts
- List of mountain ranges of Arizona
