= List of mountain ranges of La Paz County, Arizona =

A list of mountain ranges of La Paz County, Arizona, the majority in the southern section of the Lower Colorado River Valley.

== Alphabetical list ==
- Buckskin Mountains (Arizona)–La Paz County
- Chocolate Mountains (Arizona)–La Paz County
- Dome Rock Mountains–La Paz County
- Granite Wash Mountains–La Paz County
- Harcuvar Mountains–NE. La Paz County -- (SW. Yavapai County)
- Harquahala Mountains–E. La Paz County -- (W. Maricopa County)
- (Kofa Mountains–N. Yuma County - (S. La Paz County) )
- Little Buckskin Mountains–La Paz County
- Little Harquahala Mountains–La Paz County
- Little Horn Mountains–La Paz County
- Middle Mountains–S. La Paz County -- (N. Yuma County)
- New Water Mountains–La Paz County
- Plomosa Mountains–La Paz County
- Trigo Mountains–La Paz County

== See also ==
- List of mountain ranges of the Sonoran Desert
- List of mountain ranges of the Lower Colorado River Valley
