= Tyson Wash =

Dry wash in southwest Arizona, USA

- View due west from Palm Canyon (dirt road climbs beige alluvial fan) (in foreground); Trigo Mountains, south, Dome Rock Mountains, north (farthest horizon: (in California): Chocolate, Palo Verde & Little Chuckwalla mountain ranges)

- Location of Tyson Wash in Arizona

Location
- Country: United States
- State: Arizona
- Region: Lower Colorado River Valley; NW-Sonoran Desert (SE-Mojave Desert-(NW & N))
- Municipality: Quartzsite

Physical characteristics
- Length: 50 mi (80 km), (S-to-N, then W)

Tyson Wash is one of the larger eastern-bank dry washes that enter the Colorado River in western Arizona. It drains the La Posa Plain south-to-north and is also coincident with the Plain's southern two thirds.

It is also the southwest drainage of a pair of drainages, the other being the Bouse Wash drainage. They are in the Lower Colorado River Valley, south of Parker, Arizona and both enter the region east of the Colorado River, with no Colorado River confluence; they both end at regions on the eastern border of the Colorado River Indian Reservation located along the Colorado River in the Parker Valley.

== Description ==
=== La Posa Plain ===
While northeasterly, the Bouse Wash drainage borders the Bill Williams River Drainage, (almost a de facto separation line of the Mojave Desert northwest and the Sonoran Desert south and east), the Tyson Wash drains the extensive 75-mile (120 km) long north-south La Posa Plain. Quartzsite, Arizona and four mountain ranges to the south, including western regions of the Kofa National Wildlife Refuge, all drain north into Tyson Wash. The Tyson Wash forms a water divide on the south as the Castle Dome Wash and Plain drain to the south and southwest.

Tyson Wash drains northward on the western perimeter of the La Posa Plain; the Trigo Mountains are southwest, and in the north the wash turns west around the north end of the Dome Rock Mountains-(see Table). As proof of the aridity of this stretch of the western Sonoran Desert, the main transportation route north–south on the La Posa Plain is a stretch of U.S. Route 95-State Route 95 which makes no turns, even minor, for 75 miles (121 km).

The La Posa Plain turns northwest to meet the Colorado River, and the south of the Parker Valley; Tyson Wash remains to the left (southwest) of the plain's direction and enters land abutting the southeast of the Colorado River Indian Reservation.

== Communities ==
The community of Quartzsite is located on the central-north section of the wash and east-central Dome Rock Mountains; Granite Mountain south of Interstate 10 and part of southwest Quartzsite, has drainage washes feeding into Quartzsite proper. The entire Quatzsite region is a winter visitor region noted for its winter population of recreational vehicles and for its rockhounding activities because of old mines, mineralized mountains, and mild winter temperatures. An annual bazaar is held focussed partially on Rocks and Minerals. Numerous access routes to the wash and mountain areas surround Quartzsite.

== Access from north ==
The northern region of the wash is accessed by dirt road west of AZ Route 95; the route is about 25 miles (40 km) long and ends at the southern area of the Colorado River Indian Reservation, 35 miles (56 km) north of Ehrenberg, Arizona. This access route off AZ Route 95 is 2.5 miles (4 km) south of an intersection to a paved route northeasterly to Bouse through the Plomosa Mountains; that paved route is called Plomosa Road-(Bouse-Quartzsite Road), and ends at Bouse, the Bouse Wash, and the north end of the Ranegras Plain.

== Table sequence of landforms ==
The landforms surrounding the Tyson Wash section of the southern La Posa Plain:

West Mtns North	Tyson Wash	La Posa Plain	East Mtns North
Colorado River & Parker Valley; La Posa Plain	Cactus Plain; La Posa Plain	Cactus Plain; La Posa Plain	Ranegras Plain (foothills)-Plomosa Mountains)
Colorado River & Colorado River Indian Reservation; Tyson Wash	xxxxxxx	La Posa Plain	Plomosa Mountains
Dome Rock Mountains	Tyson Wash	La Posa Plain	Plomosa Mountains
Interstate 10 –Quartzsite	Interstate 10 –Quartzsite	Interstate 10 –Quartzsite	Interstate 10 –Quartzsite
Dome Rock Mountains	Tyson Wash	La Posa Plain	New Water Mountains (abuts north of Kofa Mountains)
Trigo Mountains	Tyson Wash	La Posa Plain	Palm Canyon (northwest)-Kofa Mountains
Chocolate Mountains	Tyson Wash water divide	water divide	King Valley (northern)-Castle Dome Mountains

Three plains converge at the north of the La Posa Plain. The Ranegras Plain from the southeast contains Bouse Wash. The Cactus Plain is in the center. The three plain region is bordered on the northeast by parallel mountain ranges and valleys referred to as the Maria fold and thrust belt. The entire belt region contains about thirty landforms of plains, valleys, and mountain ranges.
