= Ibex Peak (Arizona) =

Landform in La Paz County, Arizona

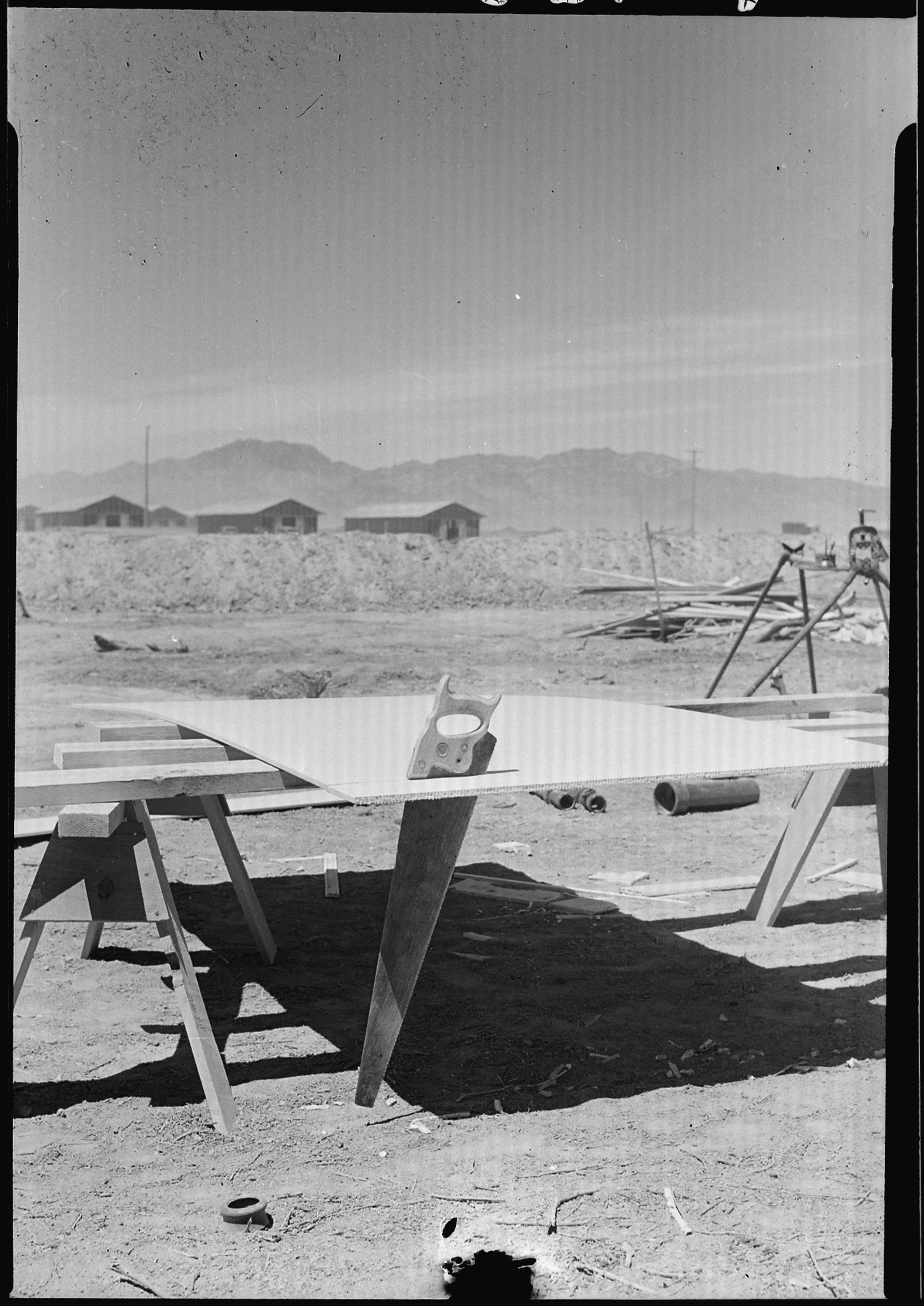
- View of Ibex Peak (at left) from Poston, Arizona

Highest point
- Elevation: 2,824 ft (861 m) NAVD 88
- Coordinates: 33°46′09″N 114°02′01″W

Geography
- Location within Arizona Location within the United States
- Location: La Paz County, Arizona, U.S
- Parent range: Plomosa Mountains

Ibex Peak (Arizona), at 2,824 feet (861 m), is a highpoint in the northern section of the Plomosa Mountains of western Arizona, near the Colorado River. The mountain range is a north–south range on the east side of the north–south La Posa Plain which parallels the Colorado River and the river valley of Parker Valley.
