= Parker Valley =

Landform within the Lower Colorado River Valley

Coordinates: 33°36′39″N 114°31′09″W

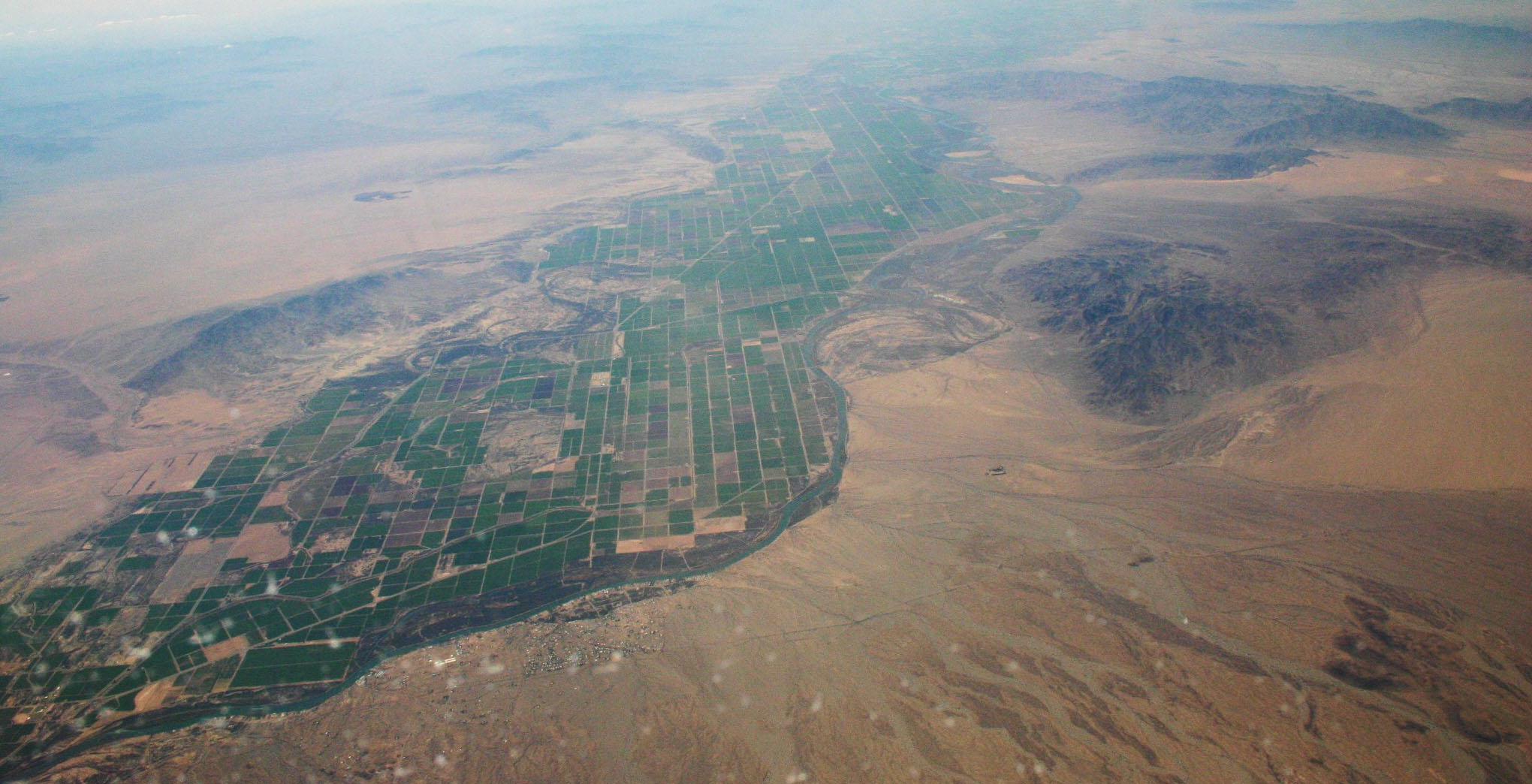
Aerial view south of the Parker Valley, with California right/west and Arizona left/east.

The Parker Valley is located along the Lower Colorado River within the Lower Colorado River Valley region, in southwestern Arizona and southeastern California.

Its natural habitats are within the Sonoran Desert (Arizona) and Colorado Desert (California) ecoregions. Riparian zone habitats on the river include Mesquite Bosques. The river has supported irrigated agricultural conversion of the valley's landscape.

== Geography ==
Three major drainages of the Colorado River enter in the Parker Valley region. The Bill Williams River and Bouse Wash have confluences with the Colorado in the northern valley area, from watersheds on the east. Tyson Wash crosses the La Posa Plain and enters downstream, with its watershed east of the river in the Colorado River Indian Reservation.

In California, the Vidal Valley and the Whipple Mountains border the Parker Valley on the northwest, and the Palo Verde Valley on the southwest. In Arizona the Buckskin Mountains border the valley on the north, the Cactus Plain and Dome Rock Mountains border it on the east.

=== Populated places ===
Settlements within Parker Valley include: Parker and Poston in Arizona; and Earp and Big River in California. It is at the northern area of the Colorado River Indian Reservation on the Colorado River, and is also at the northern perimeter of the La Posa Plain.

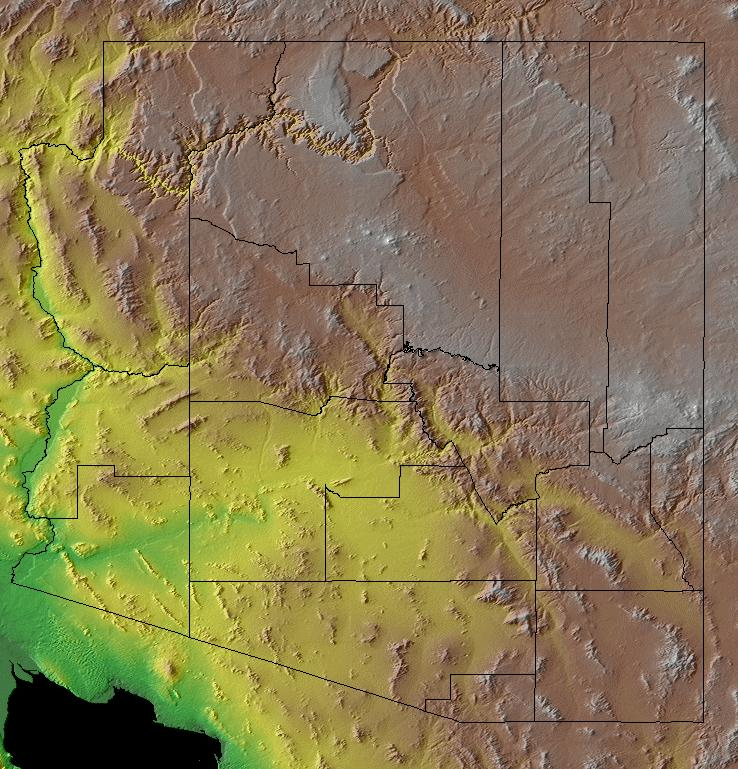
The long Parker Valley (green) along the Colorado River in southwestern Arizona and southeastern California, shown running north–south on left side of Arizona topographic map.

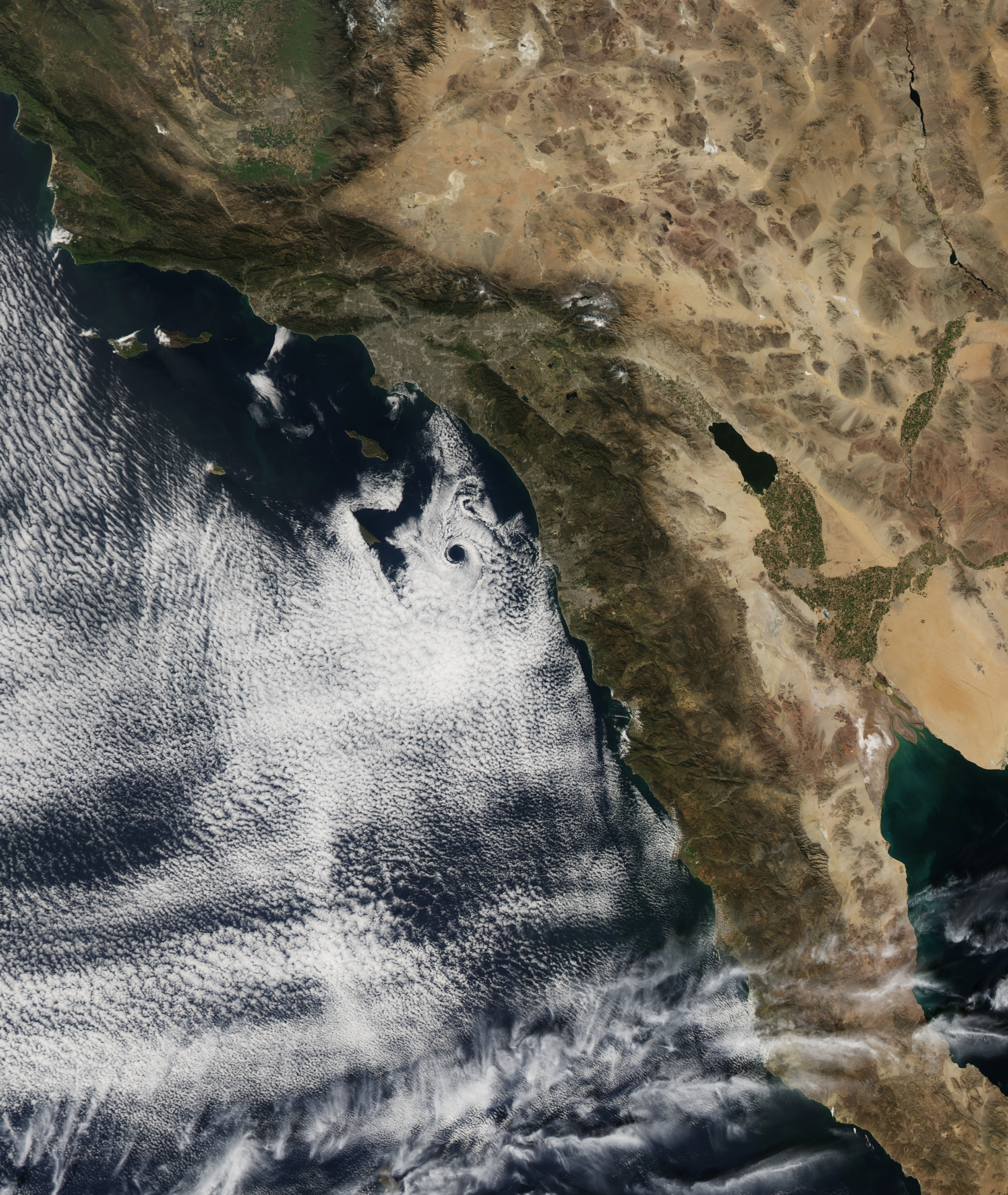
View of entire region: the larger valley just south, is the Yuma Valley area containing Yuma, Arizona.
The Yuma Valley is shown merging into the El Centro, California region at the south of the Salton Sea

== See also ==
- Valleys of the Lower Colorado River Valley
