= Palo Verde, California =

Palo Verde
- Unincorporated Community; Census-designated place
- Location in Imperial County and the state of California

- Location in the United States
- Coordinates: 33°25′58″N 114°43′56″W
- Country: United States
- State: California
- County: Imperial

Area
  - Total: 0.580 sq mi (1.502 km^{2})
  - Land: 0.580 sq mi (1.502 km^{2})
  - Water: 0 sq mi (0 km^{2}) 0%
- Elevation: 233 ft (71 m)

Population (2020)
  - Total: 152
  - Density: 262/sq mi (101/km^{2})
- Time zone: UTC-8 (Pacific (PST))
  - Summer (DST): UTC-7 (PDT)
- ZIP code: 92266
- Area codes: 442/760
- FIPS code: 06-55422
- GNIS feature IDs: 247170, 2409022

Palo Verde (Spanish for "Green Stick"; Mojave: Hanyomalivah) is a census-designated place (CDP) in Imperial County, California. Its name comes from the native desert tree, Palo Verde (Parkinsonia florida), which in turn takes its name from the Spanish words for stick (palo) and green (verde), and shares its name with the Palo Verde Valley, the valley in which it is located.

As of the 2020 census, Palo Verde had a population of 152.

The Imperial County line passes just north of the town. A community named Ripley, in Riverside County lies along SR78 between Blythe and Palo Verde.

The ZIP Code for the community is 92266 and there is no postal delivery; residents use post office boxes. There is a U.S. Postal Service post office and an Imperial County Sheriff's substation. The first post office to operate at Palo Verde opened in 1903 as Paloverde, changed its name to Palo Verde in 1905, and closed in 1940. A post office was re-established in 1949.

== Geography ==
Palo Verde is located on the Riverside County line 65 miles (105 km) northeast of El Centro, The population was 171 at the 2010 census, down from 236 in 2000. It is part of the 'El Centro, California Metropolitan Statistical Area'. State Route 78 (Ben Hulse Highway) runs north–south through the community. The majority of its population lives east of SR78 and west of the nearby Colorado River. It is also in the southern portion of the Palo Verde Valley.

According to the United States Census Bureau, the CDP has a total area of 0.6 square miles (1.6 km^{2}), all land.

=== Climate ===
Climate data for Palo Verde (230 feet above sea level)
Month	Jan	Feb	Mar	Apr	May	Jun	Jul	Aug	Sep	Oct	Nov	Dec	Year
Record high °F (°C)	89 (32)	93 (34)	100 (38)	107 (42)	114 (46)	123 (51)	123 (51)	120 (49)	121 (49)	111 (44)	95 (35)	87 (31)	123 (51)
Mean daily maximum °F (°C)	68 (20)	72 (22)	79 (26)	87 (31)	96 (36)	105 (41)	108 (42)	107 (42)	101 (38)	89 (32)	76 (24)	66 (19)	88 (31)
Daily mean °F (°C)	55 (13)	59 (15)	65 (18)	72 (22)	81 (27)	89 (32)	94 (34)	94 (34)	87 (31)	75 (24)	62 (17)	54 (12)	74 (23)
Mean daily minimum °F (°C)	42 (6)	46 (8)	50 (10)	56 (13)	65 (18)	72 (22)	80 (27)	80 (27)	72 (22)	60 (16)	48 (9)	41 (5)	59 (15)
Record low °F (°C)	20 (−7)	22 (−6)	30 (−1)	38 (3)	43 (6)	46 (8)	62 (17)	62 (17)	51 (11)	27 (−3)	26 (−3)	24 (−4)	20 (−7)
Average precipitation inches (mm)	0.49 (12)	0.61 (15)	0.50 (13)	0.09 (2.3)	0.03 (0.76)	0.01 (0.25)	0.27 (6.9)	0.53 (13)	0.41 (10)	0.17 (4.3)	0.25 (6.4)	0.49 (12)	3.85 (95.91)
Source: Weather Channel

== Demographics ==
Historical population
Census	Pop.	Note	%±
2000	236		—
2010	171		−27.5%
2020	152		−11.1%
U.S. Decennial Census; 1860–1870 1880–1890; 1900 1910 1920; 1930 1940 1950; 1960 1970 1980; 1990 2000 2010

Palo Verde first appeared as a census-designated place in the 2000 U.S. census.

=== 2020 ===
The 2020 United States census reported that Palo Verde had a population of 152. The population density was 262.1 inhabitants per square mile (101.2/km^{2}). The racial makeup of Palo Verde was 108 (71.1%) White, 4 (2.6%) African American, 2 (1.3%) Native American, 1 (0.7%) Asian, 0 (0.0%) Pacific Islander, 6 (3.9%) from other races, and 31 (20.4%) from two or more races. Hispanic or Latino of any race were 33 persons (21.7%).

The whole population lived in households. There were 84 households, out of which 4 (4.8%) had children under the age of 18 living in them, 23 (27.4%) were married-couple households, 3 (3.6%) were cohabiting couple households, 25 (29.8%) had a female householder with no partner present, and 33 (39.3%) had a male householder with no partner present. 45 households (53.6%) were one person, and 27 (32.1%) were one person aged 65 or older. The average household size was 1.81. There were 32 families (38.1% of all households).

The age distribution was 5 people (3.3%) under the age of 18, 2 people (1.3%) aged 18 to 24, 15 people (9.9%) aged 25 to 44, 62 people (40.8%) aged 45 to 64, and 68 people (44.7%) who were 65 years of age or older. The median age was 62.7 years. There were 72 males and 80 females.

There were 153 housing units at an average density of 263.8 units per square mile (101.9 units/km^{2}), of which 84 (54.9%) were occupied. Of these, 68 (81.0%) were owner-occupied, and 16 (19.0%) were occupied by renters.

=== 2010 ===
The 2010 United States census reported that Palo Verde had a population of 171. The population density was 289.6 inhabitants per square mile (111.8/km^{2}). The racial makeup of Palo Verde was 124 (73%) White, 2 (1%) African American, 5 (3%) Native American, 1 (1%) Asian, 0 (0%) Pacific Islander, 26 (15%) from other races, and 13 (8%) from two or more races. Hispanic or Latino of any race were 33 persons (19%).

The Census reported that 171 people (100% of the population) lived in households, 0 (0%) lived in non-institutionalized group quarters, and 0 (0%) were institutionalized.

There were 84 households, out of which 11 (13%) had children under the age of 18 living in them, 28 (33%) were opposite-sex married couples living together, 4 (5%) had a female householder with no husband present, 7 (8%) had a male householder with no wife present. There were 7 (8%) unmarried opposite-sex partnerships, and 0 (0%) same-sex married couples or partnerships. 40 households (48%) were made up of individuals, and 17 (20%) had someone living alone who was 65 years of age or older. The average household size was 2.04. There were 39 families (46% of all households); the average family size was 2.90.

The population was spread out, with 25 people (15%) under the age of 18, 15 people (9%) aged 18 to 24, 23 people (14%) aged 25 to 44, 65 people (38.0%) aged 45 to 64, and 43 people (25%) who were 65 years of age or older. The median age was 54.5 years. For every 100 females, there were 119.2 males. For every 100 females age 18 and over, there were 121.2 males.

There were 211 housing units at an average density of 357.3 units per square mile (138.0 units/km^{2}), of which 84 were occupied, of which 35 (41.7%) were owner-occupied, and 49 (58.3%) were occupied by renters. The homeowner vacancy rate was 17%; the rental vacancy rate was 17%. 63 people (37% of the population) lived in owner-occupied housing units and 108 people (63%) lived in rental housing units.

=== 2000 ===
As of the census of 2000, the median income for a household in the CDP was $12,772, and the median income for a family was $14,333. Males had a median income of $13,281 versus $9,792 for females. The per capita income for the CDP was $7,275. About 45% of families and 47% of the population were below the poverty line, including 71% of those under the age of eighteen and 13% of those 65 or over.

== Politics and government ==
In the state legislature, Palo Verde is in the 18th senatorial district, represented by Democrat Steve Padilla, and the 36th Assembly district, represented by Republican Jeff Gonzalez.

Federally, Palo Verde is in California's 25th congressional district, represented by Democrat Raul Ruiz.

Palo Verde receives water from the Palo Verde County Water District.

== See also ==
- San Diego–Imperial, California
- El Centro Metropolitan Area
- Blythe, California
