= Trigo Mountains Wilderness =

Protected area in Yuma County, Arizona

- IUCN category Ib (wilderness area)
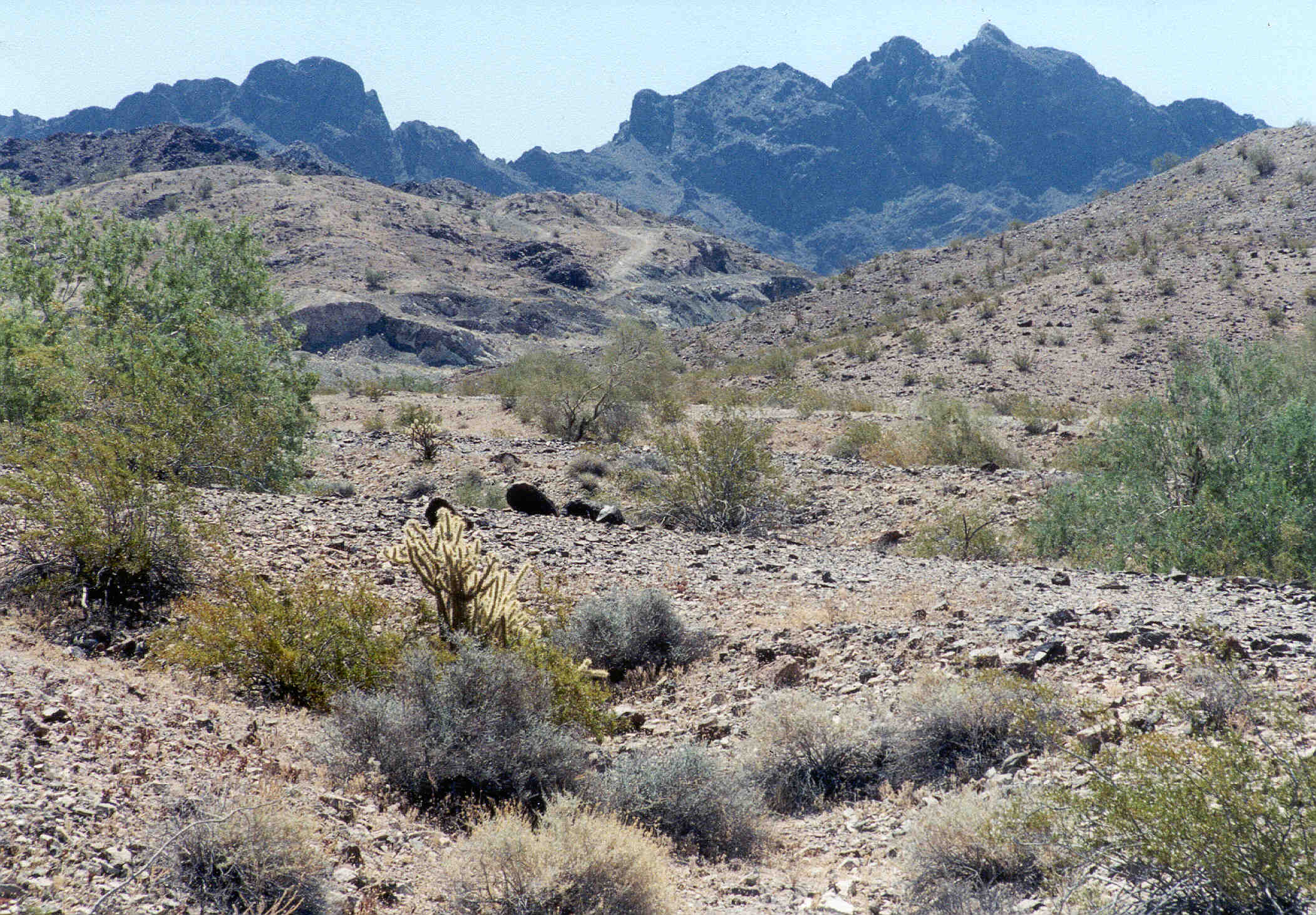

- Location within Arizona Location within the United States
- Interactive map of Trigo Mountains Wilderness
- Location: La Paz County, Arizona, United States
- Nearest city: Yuma
- Coordinates: 33.1809058759°N 114.622290287°W
- Area: 30,300 acres (12,262 ha)
- Established: 1990
- Governing body: Bureau of Land Management

Trigo Mountains Wilderness is a 30,300-acre (12,262 ha) wilderness area in the U.S. state of Arizona and was established in 1990. It is located 30 miles (48 km) north of Yuma east of the Colorado River in an area called the Lower Colorado River Valley. It is a 15-mile (24 km) stretch of ridgeline of the rugged desert Trigo Mountains and is adjacent to historical mines, the Red Cloud and Hart Mine. These rugged desert mountain ecosystems are home to the Desert Bighorn Sheep.

The wilderness area is one of the many wildernesses located within the Lower Colorado River Valley. The Trigo Mountains Wilderness is the northeastern mountain border of the Imperial National Wildlife Refuge along the Colorado River. It is also just east of the Cibola National Wildlife Refuge. The northeast boundary of the wilderness borders the Yuma Proving Ground.

This ecoregion portion of the Colorado River Valley, of two waterfowl refuges, and mountains is associated with the US Army installation of the Yuma Proving Grounds. A major mountain system lies just eastwards, the Kofa National Wildlife Refuge, (with its adjacent Wilderness Area). It is separated by bajada plains from the Trigo Mountains, and other ranges; local tribes of burros and mustangs occur; also mountain lions and bobcat. Free species movements occur, though some animal control is required for the burros and horses along the major route US 95, (north–south route).

== See also ==
- List of U.S. Wilderness Areas
- List of Arizona Wilderness Areas
- List of Arizona Wilderness Areas (LCRV)
