= West Silver Bell Mountains =

Mountain range of south-central Arizona

- Location within Arizona

Highest point
- Peak: Solo Peak, West Silver Bell Mountains
- Elevation: 2,747 ft (837 m)
- Coordinates: 32°30′12″N 111°40′25″W

Dimensions
- Length: 10 mi (16 km) NW-SE
- Width: 4 mi (6.4 km)

Geography
- Country: United States
- State: Arizona
- Region: Sonoran Desert
- Districts: Pima County and Pinal County
- Settlement: Saguaro
- Range coordinates: 32°30′12″N 111°40′25″W
- Borders on: Aguirre Valley and Silver Bell Mountains
- Topo map(s): USGS Silver Bell West, Greene Reservoir and Gap Tank 7.5 Min. Quads

The West Silver Bell Mountains are a small 10 mile (16 km) long mountain range of south-central Arizona, United States. The range lies in the north-central arid Sonoran Desert; the Madrean Sky Islands region of southeast Arizona, around Tucson is adjacent to the southeast.

The range lies mostly in Pima County with only the northernmost end extending into southern Pinal County The range lies 25 mi west of Marana, and 25 mi south of Eloy–Casa Grande, all cities on Interstate 10 in Arizona. Casa Grande also begins the west route of Interstate 8 to Yuma and San Diego.

== Description ==
The West Silver Bell Mountains are a small, low elevation range, in eastern regions of Arizona's Sonoran Desert. Lower elevation regions west or southwest are even more arid, as the Sonoran Desert gets closer to the Gran Desierto de Altar in northwestern Mexico.

The West Silver Bell Mountains are northwest–southeast trending, and merge in the southeast with the Silver Bell Mountains. Both mountain ranges are named for the townsite of Silver Bell, and the Silver Bell Mine at the southern region of the Silver Bell Mountains. The southwest end of the Sawtooth Mountains of Pinal County lies 10 km (6 mi) to the northwest. To the west across Aguirre Valley lie the Slate Mountains of Pinal County and the Santa Rosa Mountains of Pima County.

The West Silver Bell Mountains lie to the northeast of the Aguirre Valley, a 35 mi (56 km) long, northwest-by-southeast trending valley bordered by five regional, low-elevation mountain ranges. The valley is Basin and Range oriented, and the north merges into the floodplain region near the confluence of the northwest-flowing section of the Santa Cruz River with the Gila River. The community of Saguaro lies at the southeast end foothills of the West Silver Bell Mountains, and is also bordered east by the main Silver Bell range foothills.

The high point of the range is Solo Peak, 2,747 feet (837 m), on the northwest end of the range 32°30′12″N 111°40′25″W. At the southeast end of the range, and slightly offset to the northeast is the Malpais Hill, 2,682 feet (817 m); Malpais Hill is also connected to the northwest part of the Silver Bell Mountains.

The portion of the range in Pima County lies within the Ironwood Forest National Monument.
