= Earp, California =

Unincorporated community in California, United States

- Unincorporated community
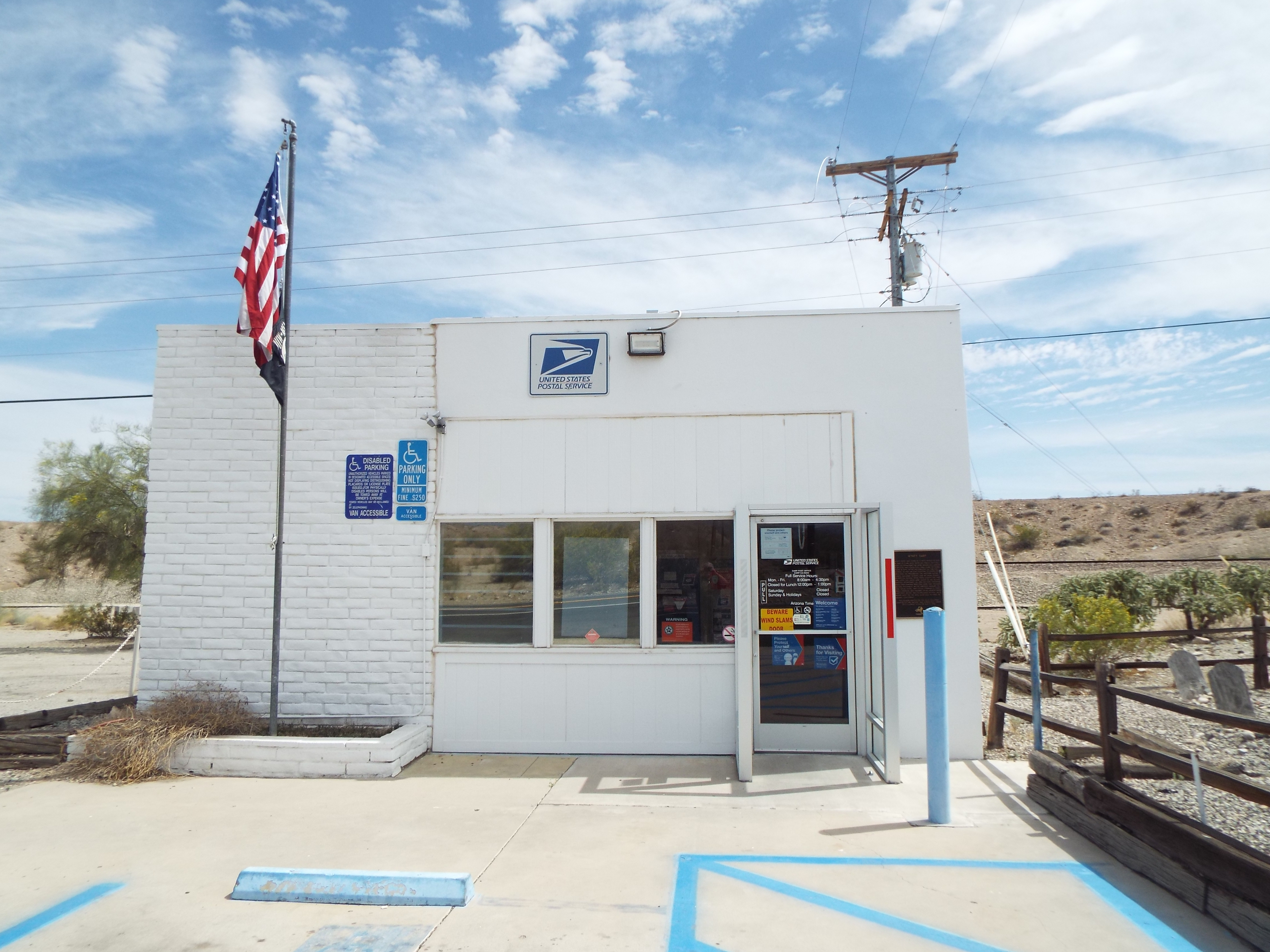
- Earp Post Office

- Location within the state of California Earp, California (the United States)
- Coordinates: 34°09′54″N 114°18′04″W
- Country: United States
- State: California
- County: San Bernardino
- Elevation: 397 ft (121 m)
- Time zone: UTC-8 (Pacific (PST))
  - Summer (DST): UTC-7 (PDT)
- ZIP codes: 92242
- Area code: 760

Earp, California is an unincorporated community in San Bernardino County in the Sonoran Desert close to the California/Arizona state line at the Colorado River in Parker Valley.

The town, originally named Drennan in 1910, was renamed Earp in 1929. It was named for famed Old West lawman Wyatt Earp who with his common-law wife, Josephine Sarah Marcus, lived part-time in the area beginning in 1906. Earp staked more than 100 copper and gold mining claims near the base of the Whipple Mountains.

They bought a small cottage in nearby Vidal and lived there during the fall, winter and spring months of 1925 – 1928, while he worked his "Happy Days" mines in the Whipple Mountains a few miles north. It was the only permanent residence they owned the entire time they were married. They spent the winters of his last years working the claims but lived in Los Angeles during the summers, where Wyatt died on January 13, 1929.

Though the town was never incorporated, the post office near Earp's mining claims at the eastern terminus of Highway 62 near Parker, AZ was renamed "Wyatt Earp, California" after Earp's death in 1930 with a ZIP code of 92242. For amusement only there is a tiny cemetery showing the fake grave of Wyatt Earp (his actual grave is in the Hills of Eternity Cemetery in Colma, just south of San Francisco).

The post office is more than 220 miles (350 km) from the county seat in San Bernardino, California; further than any other in the county. The entire region on the California side falls under area code 760.

Unofficial alternate names of the area are listed as Big River, Drenna and Drennan.

Since Earp is an unincorporated community of San Bernardino County, County CEO Leonard X. Hernandez would be considered the Chief Administrator of Earp.

== Images of Earp ==
These are images of the area where the Earp Post Office is located. Included is the symbolic cemetery dedicated to Wyatt Earp.

Earp

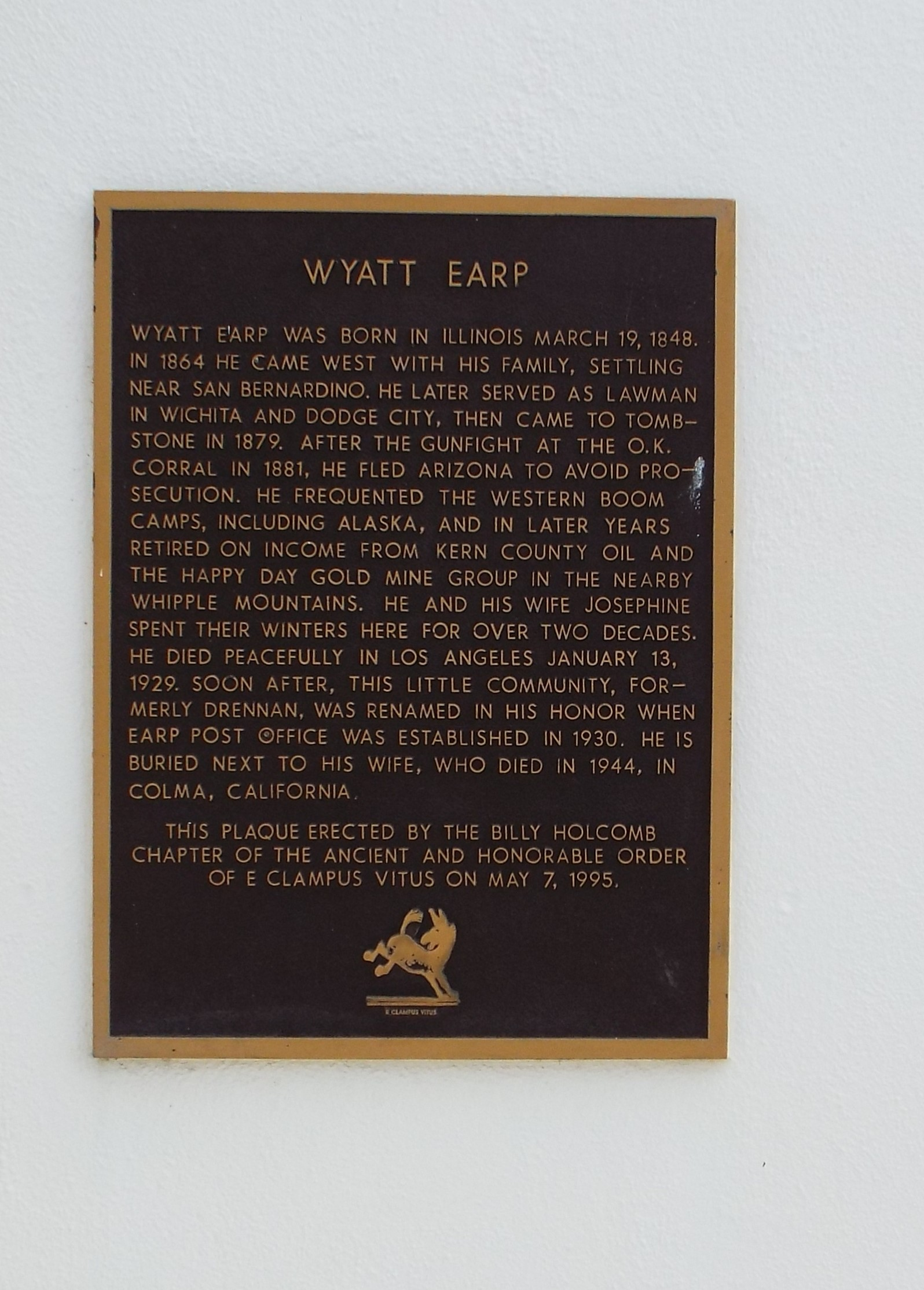
Earp Post Office Marker

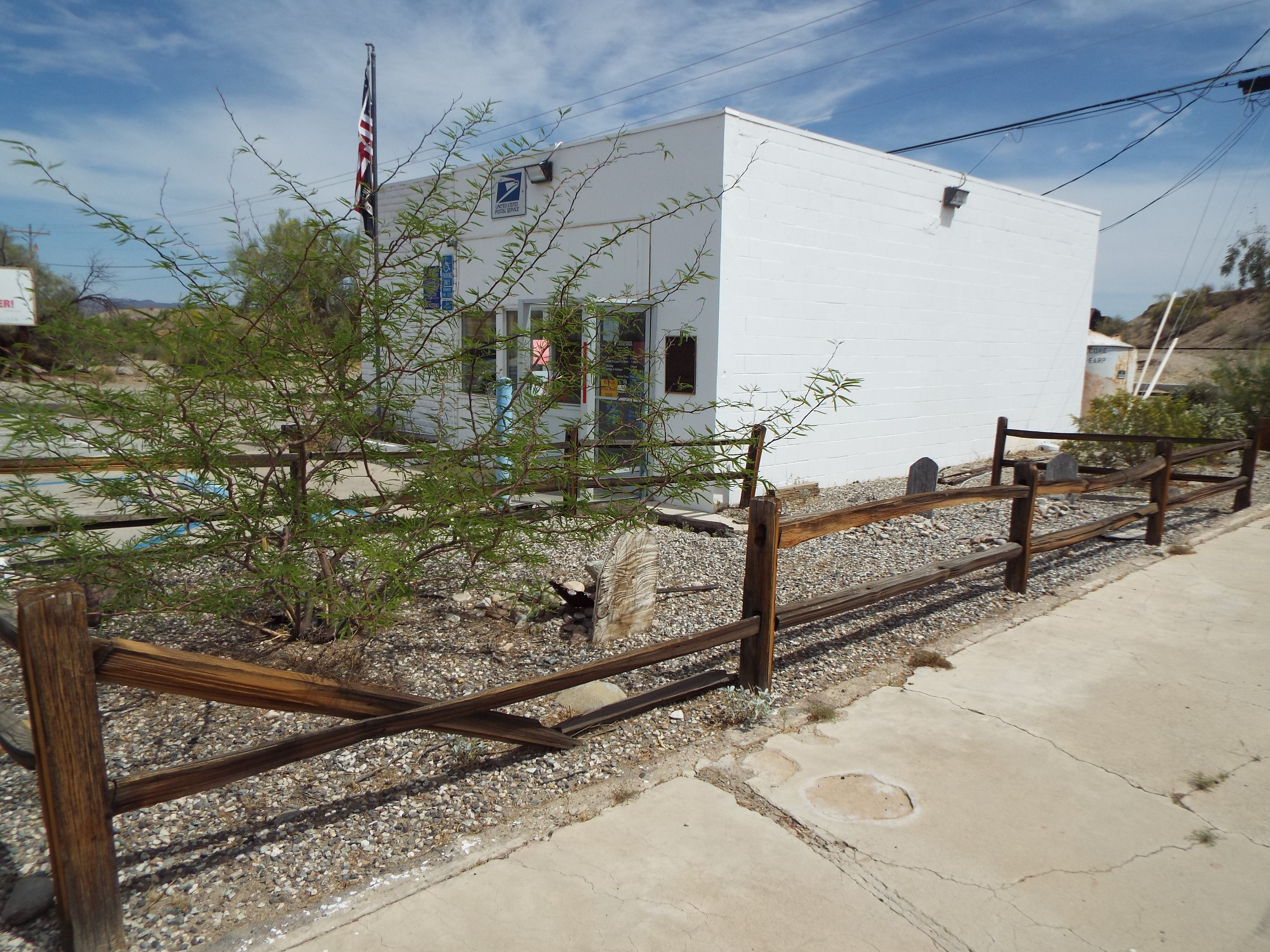
Earp Post Office and symbolic cemetery

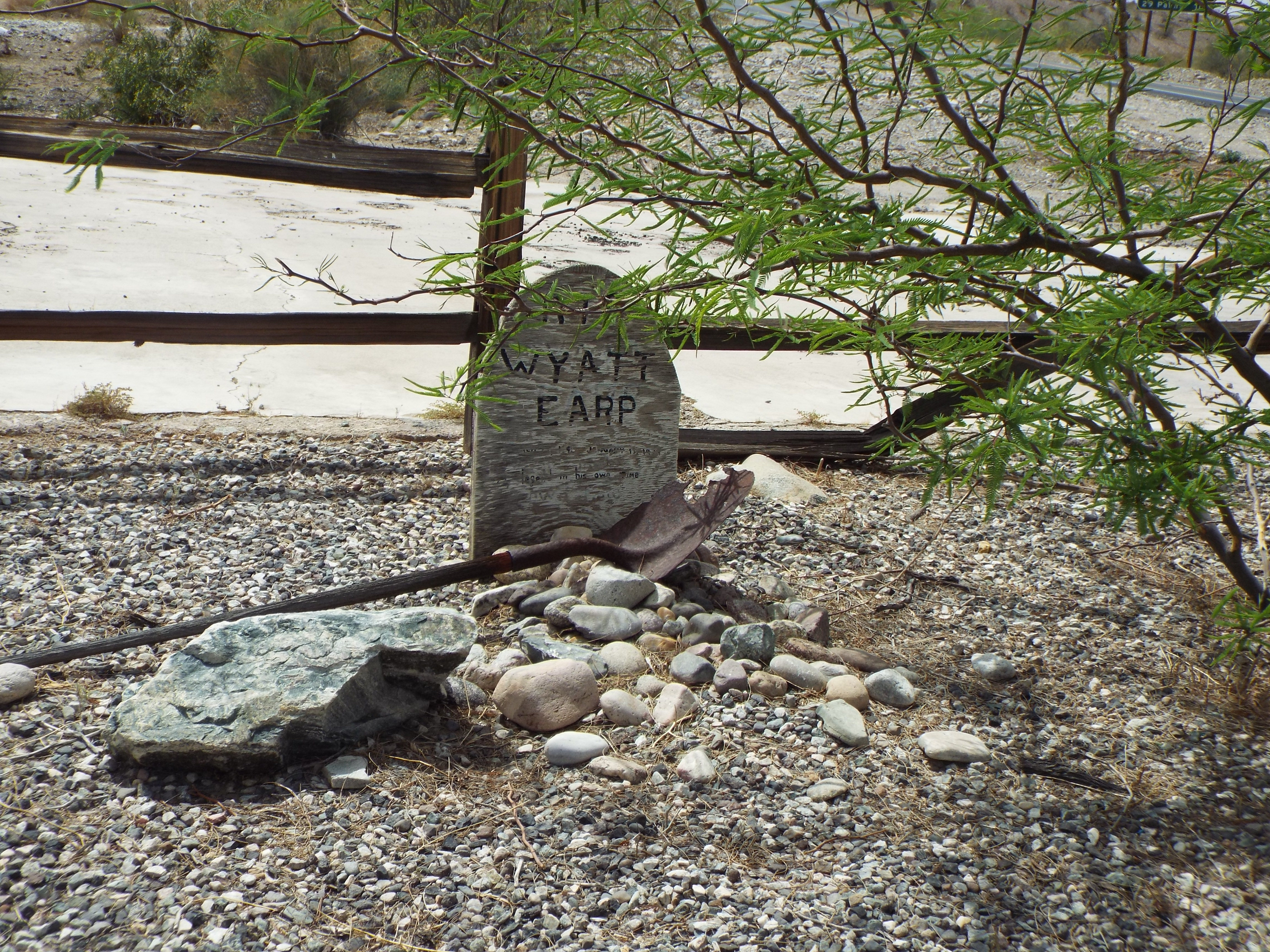
The Wyatt Earp symbolic grave

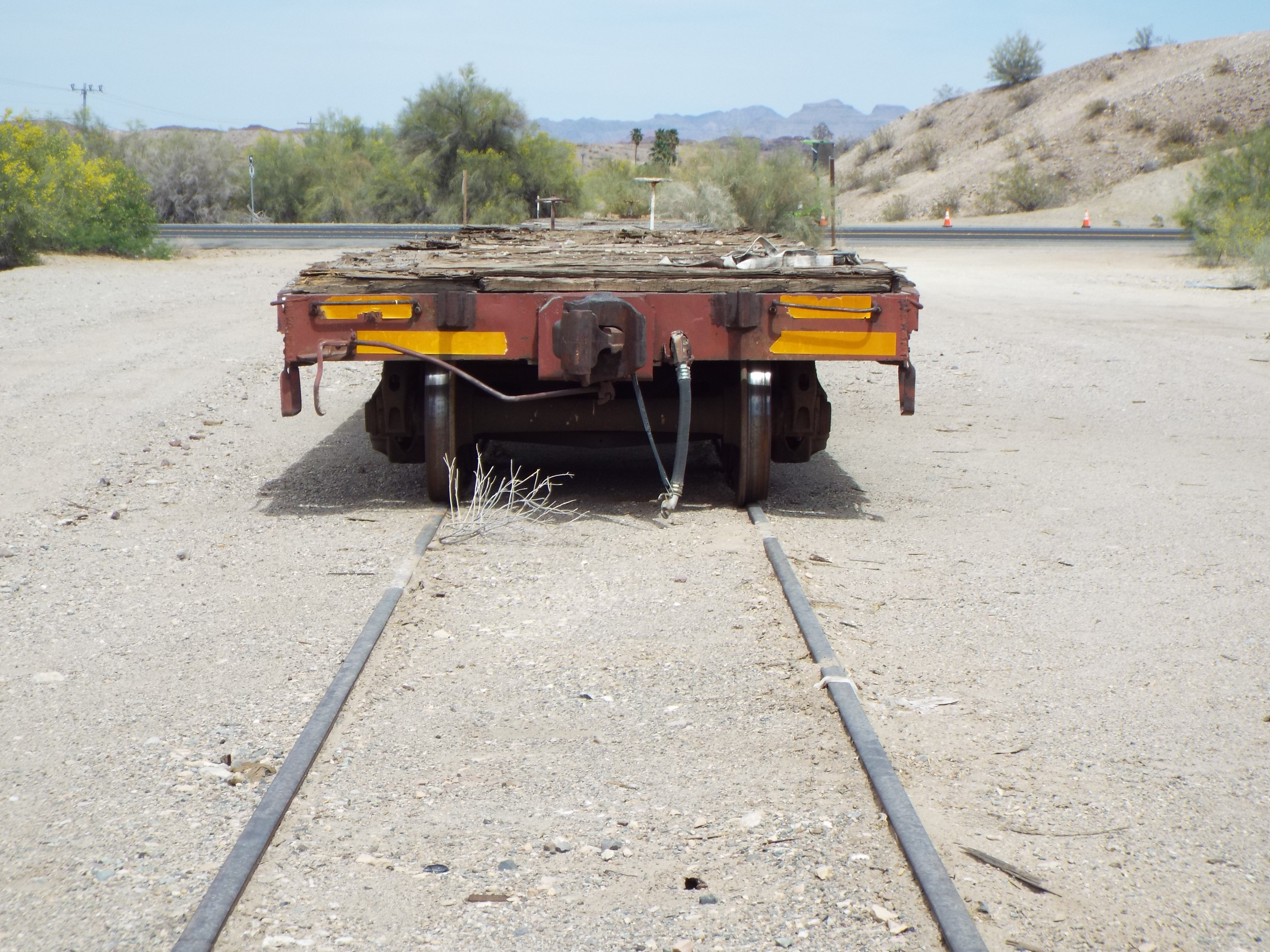
Abandoned Railroad Car in Earp

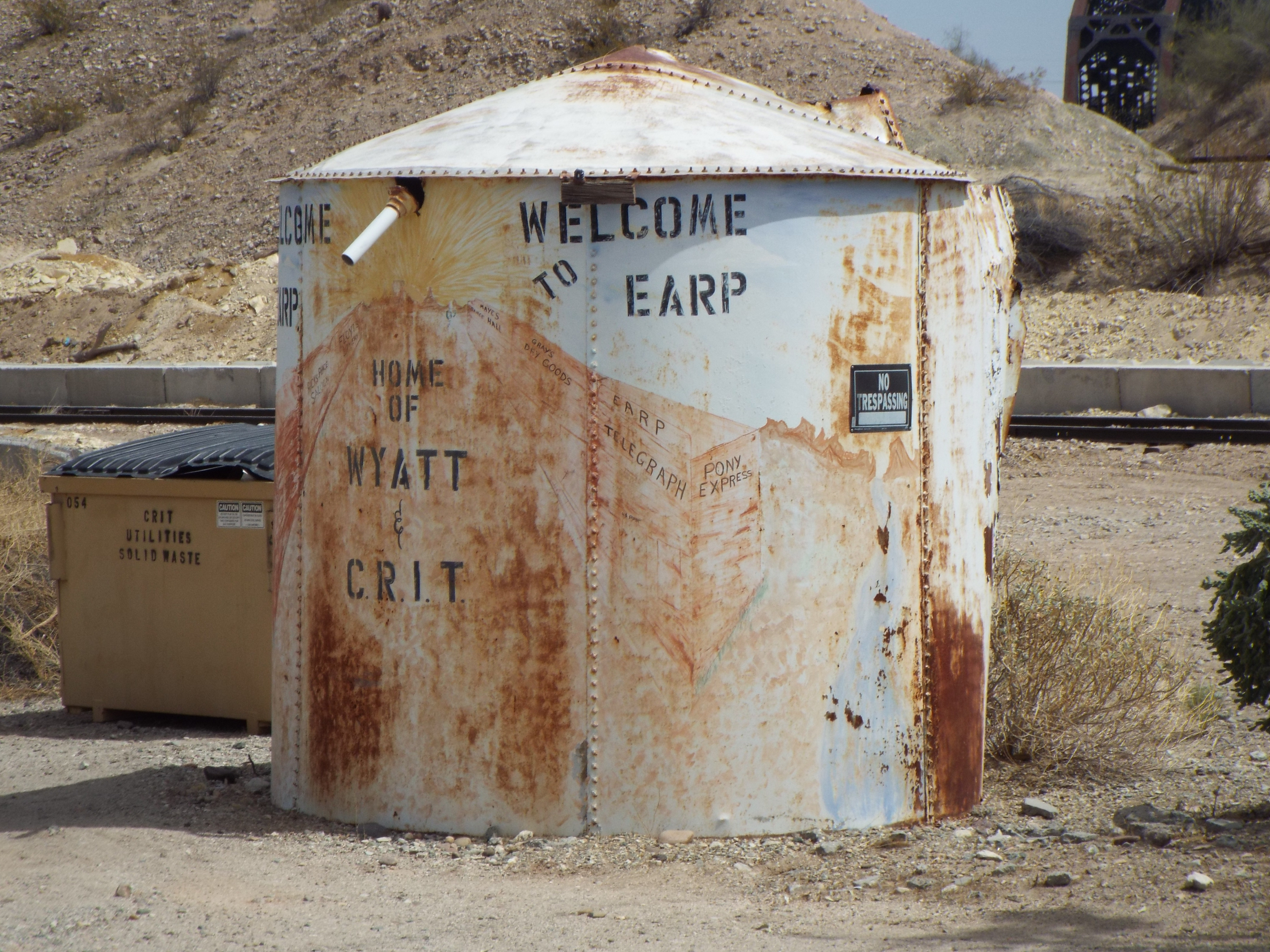
Top portion of the old Water Tower in Earp

== External links and references ==
- Map and GPS coordinates
- U.S. Geological Survey Geographic Names Information System: Earp
