= Little Mule Mountains =

Landform in Imperial County, California

- Location within California

Highest point
- Elevation: 381 m (1,250 ft)

Geography
- Country: United States
- State: California
- District: Imperial County
- Range coordinates: 33°18′27.116″N 115°5′21.899″W
- Topo map: USGS Little Mule Mountains

The Little Mule Mountains are a mountain range in Imperial County, California.
