= Dome Rock Mountains =

Mountain range in La Paz County, Arizona, USA

Highest point
- Peak: Cunningham Mountain
- Elevation: 3,314 ft (1,010 m)
- Coordinates: 33°34′12″N 114°20′59″W

Dimensions
- Length: 30 mi (48 km) N-S-(NW-SE)
- Width: 8 mi (13 km)

Geography
- Country: United States
- State: Arizona
- Region: Sonoran Desert–(northwestern)
- Range coordinates: 33°41′N 114°20′W
- Borders on: La Posa Plain-E; Plomosa Mountains-E (Trigo Mountains-SW)
- Topo map: USGS Blythe

The Dome Rock Mountains are a mountain range in southern La Paz County, Arizona. The range borders the Colorado River on the west and the Colorado River Indian Reservation on the northwest located in the Lower Colorado River Valley. Quartzsite, Arizona lies on the eastern foothills of the range.

The Dome Rock Mountains are on the southwest of the regional Maria fold and thrust belt.

== Range summary ==
The Dome Rock Mountains are a north-south trending range about 30 miles (48 km) long. The Palo Verde Valley borders the range on the west, adjacent to the Colorado River. Interstate 10 bisects the range connecting Ehrenberg on the Colorado River with Quartzsite to the east of the mountains. Quartzsite lies on the western edge of the La Posa Plain which drains the western Kofa National Wildlife Refuge. The Tyson Wash drainage flows north at the western perimeter of the La Posa Plain and turns westwards at the north end of the Dome Rock Mountains to meet the Colorado River region.

Cunningham Mountain at 3,314 feet (1,010 m) is the highest peak of the Dome Rock Mountains and is located about 6 miles (10 km) south of Interstate 10. In the north Middle Camp Mountain rises to 2,515 feet (767 m) about 2 miles (3 km) north of I-10. Numerous mines and dry washes are located in the range. The western mountain washes drain to the Colorado River, and the eastern washes drain into the La Posa Plain and the north-flowing Tyson Wash.

== Dome Rock Mountains access ==
The northern portion of the mountains can be accessed from the west via Arizona State Route 95; from the east through the Colorado River Indian Reservation, and I 10.

Quartzsite is in the east center of the range and provides numerous access points. Ehrenberg to the west provides access to areas of the western mountain flank.

== Graves found ==
Miners' graves and a cabin have been found near the Yellow Dog Mine.

== See also ==
- List of mountain ranges of La Paz County, Arizona
- List of LCRV Wilderness Areas (Colorado River)
- Kofa National Wildlife Refuge
