= Mule Mountains (California) =

Mountain range in California, United States

- Location within California

Highest point
- Elevation: 378 m (1,240 ft)

Geography
- Country: United States
- State: California
- District: Riverside County
- Range coordinates: 33°30′32″N 114°49′53″W
- Topo map: USGS Roosevelt Mine

The Mule Mountains of California are located in the southeastern part of the state in the United States. The range lies in a northeast-southwesterly direction south of the McCoy Mountains and west of the Palo Verde Valley and Colorado River. The mountain range is approximately 18 miles (29 km) long and is located just south of Interstate 10, about 5 mi (8 km) southeast of Chuckawalla Valley State Prison. The northern end of the range is in Riverside County, and the southern end is in Imperial County. Downtown Blythe, California is about 12 mi (19 km) to the northeast.
