= New Water Mountains =

Landform in La Paz County, Arizona

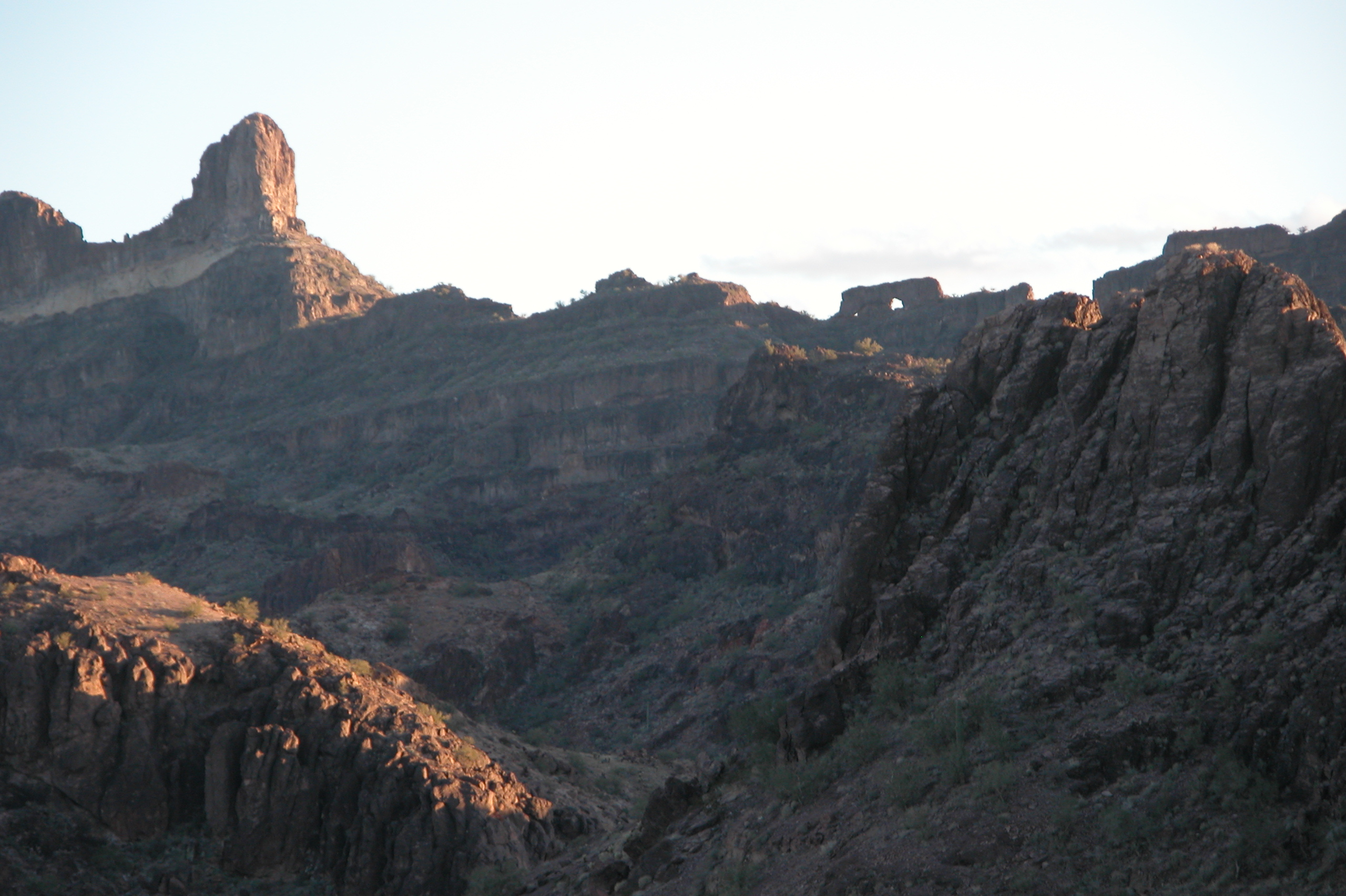
- Eagles Eye Arch in New Water Mountains

Highest point
- Peak: Black Mesa (New Water)
- Elevation: 3,639 ft (1,109 m)

Geography
- Country: United States
- State: Arizona
- Range coordinates: 33°31′44″N 113°54′48″W

The New Water Mountains is a mountain range in southwestern Arizona. The range is on the northern border of the Kofa National Wildlife Refuge as well as the northern Kofa Mountains.

It is a northwest–southeast trending range, about 20 miles (32 km) long and composed of volcanic rocks. The southeast third of the range is in the Kofa Refuge, and the mountain range merges northwesterly into the Plomosa Mountains of southern La Paz County. The central part of the range is the New Water Mountains Wilderness with a lengthy east–west border on the northern Kofa National Wildlife Refuge of about 12 miles. The highest point is Black Mesa at 3,639 feet (1,109 m).

Three northerly routes access the mountain range; the central route accesses the Ramsey Mine and eventually the central dry wash on the north; other mines, such as the Republic Mine, are in these mountains, as well as some springs (Dripping Springs); also Brintley Well on a fourth westerly access route. The closest community to the north side of the mountain range is Brenda, Arizona, east of Quartzsite. Brenda is on US 60, four miles (6.4 km) northeast of Interstate 10.

The mountains are known for their biological diversity. Species known to have resided in the area include the spotted leaf-nosed snake, the long-nosed snake, night snake, the glossy snake, and the desert spiny lizard.

== See also ==
- List of mountain ranges of La Paz County, Arizona
- List of mountain ranges of Arizona
- List of LCRV Wilderness Areas (Colorado River)
