= La Posa Plain =

Landform in western Arizona, United States

Coordinates: 33.599194°N 114.1816121°W

The La Posa Plain is a wide, generally flat plain in western Arizona near the Colorado River and is on the west and northwest border of the Kofa National Wildlife Refuge. The plain lies to the east of the Colorado River Indian Reservation and east of the Dome Rock and Trigo Mountains. Quartzsite, Arizona, lies on the western part of the plain, which crosses both Interstate 10 and U.S. Route 95.

View of southern frontier of La Posa Plain, looking westward from inside Palm Canyon, Kofa Mountains

The Plomosa, New Water and Kofa ranges border to the east. To the south the plain terminates at a drainage divide between the Castle Dome Mountains to the southeast and the Chocolate Mountains to the southwest.

The northern reaches of the plain is crossed by the Bouse Wash west of Bouse and extends on to east of Parker, terminating along the Cactus Plain south of the Buckskin Mountains. Arizona State Route 72 crosses the plain between Bouse and Parker.

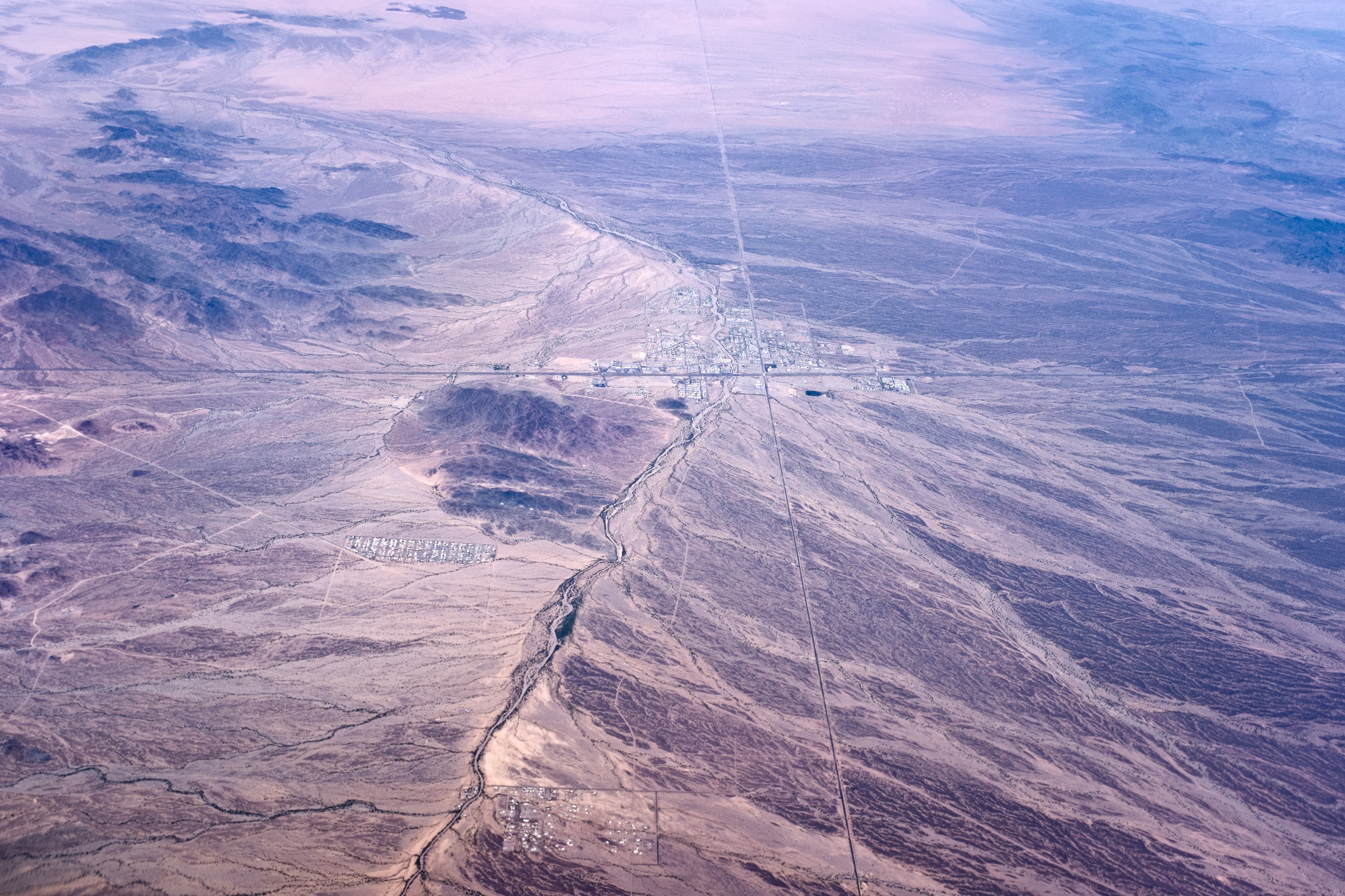
Quartzsite, Arizona & southern La Posa Plain, looking north downhill on the La Posa Plain. The mountain range at the west (left) is the Dome Rock Mountains.
