= Palo Verde Valley =

Valley in California, United States

Coordinates: 33°21′27″N 114°42′32″W

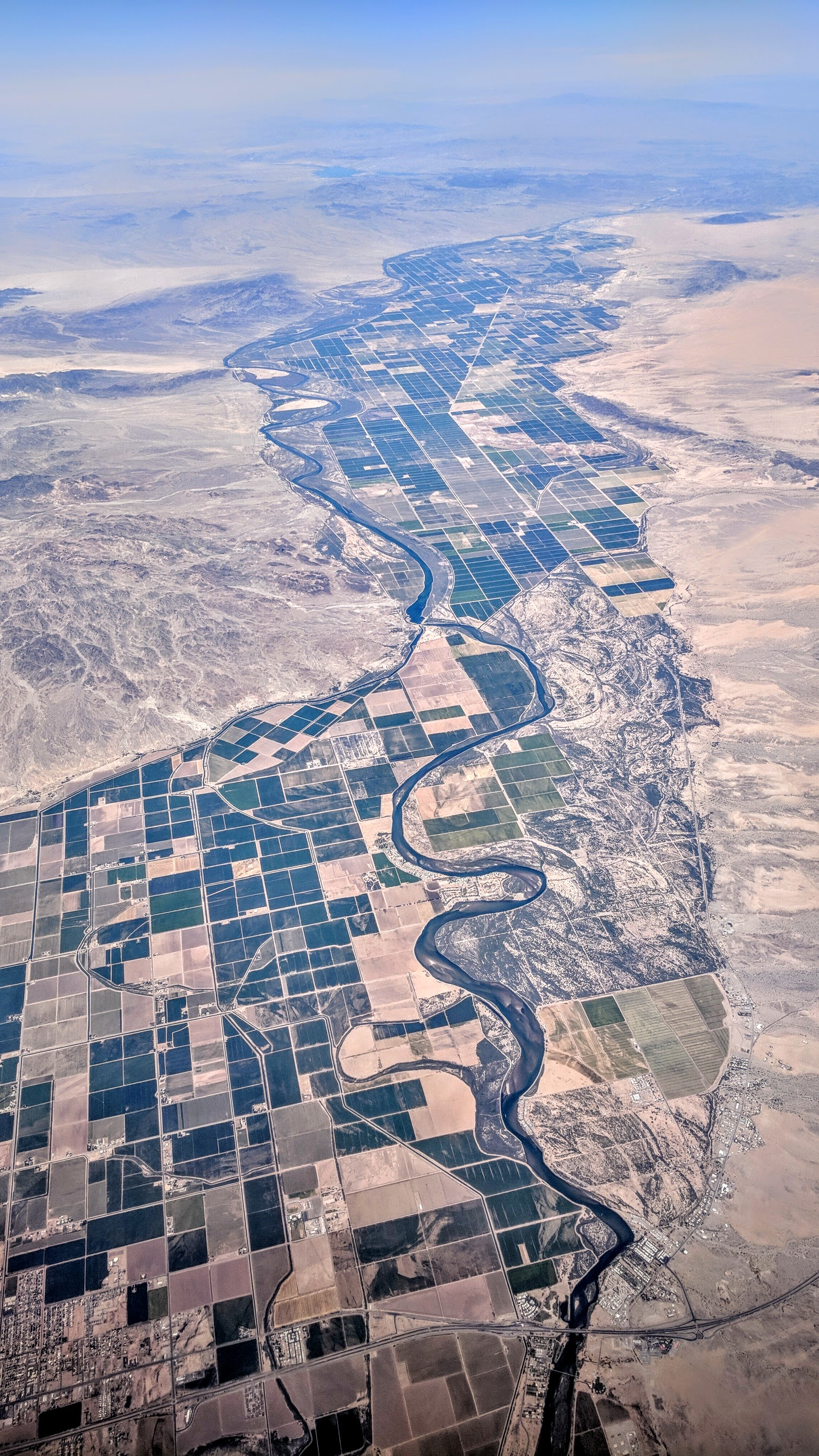
Aerial view looking north along the Palo Verde Valley and into the Parker Valley, where the Colorado River defines the border between California (left) and Arizona (right). A portion of the city of Blythe, California, and Ehrenberg, Arizona, and Interstate Highway 10 are visible at the bottom.

The Palo Verde Valley (Spanish: Valle de Palo Verde) is located in the Lower Colorado River Valley, next to the eastern border of Southern California with Arizona, United States. It is located on the Colorado Desert within the Sonoran Desert south of the Parker Valley. Most of the valley is in Riverside County, with the southern remainder in Imperial County. La Paz County borders to the east on the Colorado River.

The region is the ancestral home of several Native American tribes: the Quechan, the Chemehuevi and Matxalycadom or Halchidhoma, some who have Indian reservations in California and Arizona along the Colorado and Gila Rivers today.

== Geography ==
The Palo Verde Valley is part of the Sonoran Desert's Colorado Desert. The Big Maria Mountains are north of the valley, and the Colorado River forms the valley's boundaries to the east and south. Other mountains nearby are the McCoy Mountains to the west (north in Interstate 10), the Chocolate Mountains to the south, the Little Maria Mountains to the northwest, and the Dome Rock Mountains to the east.

== Features ==
Agriculture is the valley's most important industry since indigenous farming. Crops include melons, alfalfa, cotton and vegetables. The Palo Verde Irrigation District (PVID), with its water sourced from the Palo Verde Diversion Dam, controls the canal system for these fields. Dating back to Thomas Henry Blythe's filing in 1877, the PVID has the most senior Colorado River water rights of any California agency.

The city of Blythe is in the center of the Palo Verde Valley and is the only incorporated community. Other communities include Mesa Verde, Ripley, and Palo Verde. Across the Colorado from the southern edge of the Palo Verde Valley is Cibola Valley.

=== Water transfers to MWD ===
In a 2005 agreement, Metropolitan Water District of Southern California (MWD) negotiated with PVID in Blythe to fallow, or idle, farm land for 35 years. The deal will transfer water that would have been used for farming in the area of Blythe, Ripley and Palo Verde to MWD.

According to a 1990 pilot study, water diversions and fallowed farm land reduced farming employment. The MWD provided $6 million in a development fund to reimburse the community for losses caused by shifting water to urban areas.

California currently uses more than its allotted share of water from the Colorado River. The transfer agreement also seeks to address over-use of river water. It is partly designed to reduce overall diversions from the river.

In 2015, MWD purchased more than 12,000 acres (4,900 hectares) in the valley in addition to 9,000 acres (3,600 hectares) owned as of 2004, and is now PVID's biggest landowner. The Irvine Ranch Water District also purchased 3,100 acres (1,300 hectares). On August 4, 2017, PVID filed a lawsuit against MWD over the latter's most recent land purchase and six land leases, which was accused of illegally obtaining water rights.

== Transportation ==
Interstate 10 goes through the Palo Verde Valley in an east-west direction across Blythe. US Route 95 goes through the northeastern part of the Valley. California State Route 78's northern terminus is near the valley's western edge from Interstate 10.

The Blythe Airport is west of the valley.

Rail transportation by the Arizona and California Railroad served the valley until 2007.

Public transportation, by bus is operated by Palo Verde Valley Transit Agency, which offers lifeline service to the Coachella valley. FlixBus and Greyhound Lines also serve the community of Blythe on their routes between Los Angeles and Phoenix.

== See also ==
- Parker Valley
