= Plomosa Mountains =

Landform in La Paz County, Arizona

Coordinates: 33.700°N 114.051°W

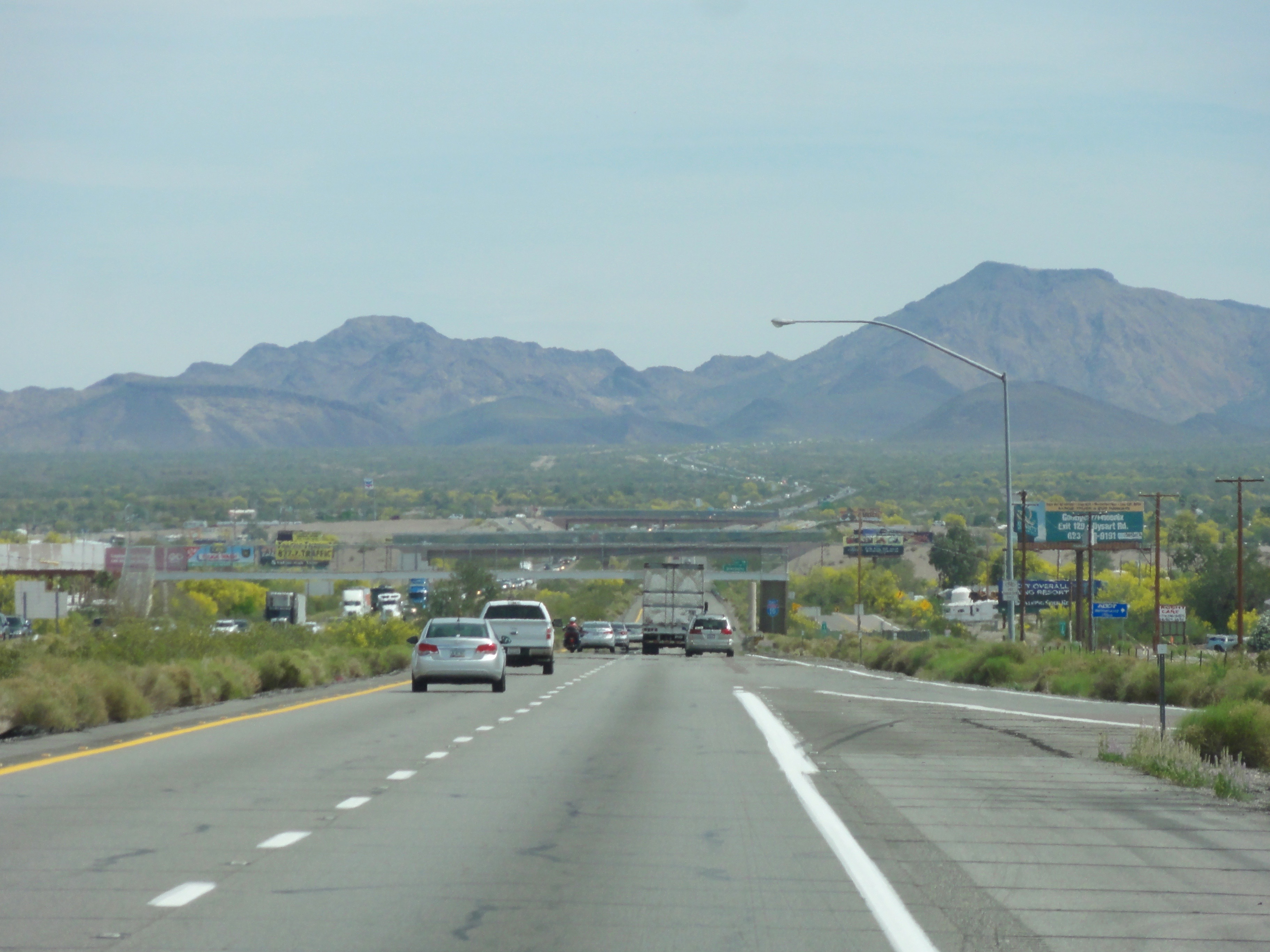
- section of west flank of Plomosa Mountains (as viewed from Quartzsite, Arizona on Interstate 10 in Arizona) (high resolution expandable photo)

Highest point
- Peak: Black Mesa (Plomosa Mountains)
- Elevation: 3,639 ft (1,109 m)

Dimensions
- Length: 25 mi (40 km) N-S
- Width: 6 mi (9.7 km)

Geography
- Country: United States
- State: Arizona
- Borders on: La Posa Plain and the Dome Rock Mountainsto the West; New Water Mountains to the SE

The Plomosa Mountains are a mountain range in La Paz County, Arizona, running generally south of Bouse, Arizona near the Arizona/California border. Quartzsite lies to the west across the La Posa Plain. The Harcuvar Mountains and Little Harquahala Mountains lie to the east across the Ranegras Plain. The New Water Mountains lie to the southeast beyond Black Mesa.

Interstate 10 crosses the center of the range. The Plomosa ghost town and mining camp lie on the southwest side of the range.

Evidence of both thrust faulting and strike-slip faulting is present in the Plomosa Mountains.

The highpoint of the range is Black Mesa (La Paz County) in the southern regions. Ibex Peak is a highpoint in the north.
