= Trigo Mountains =

Landform in La Paz County, Arizona

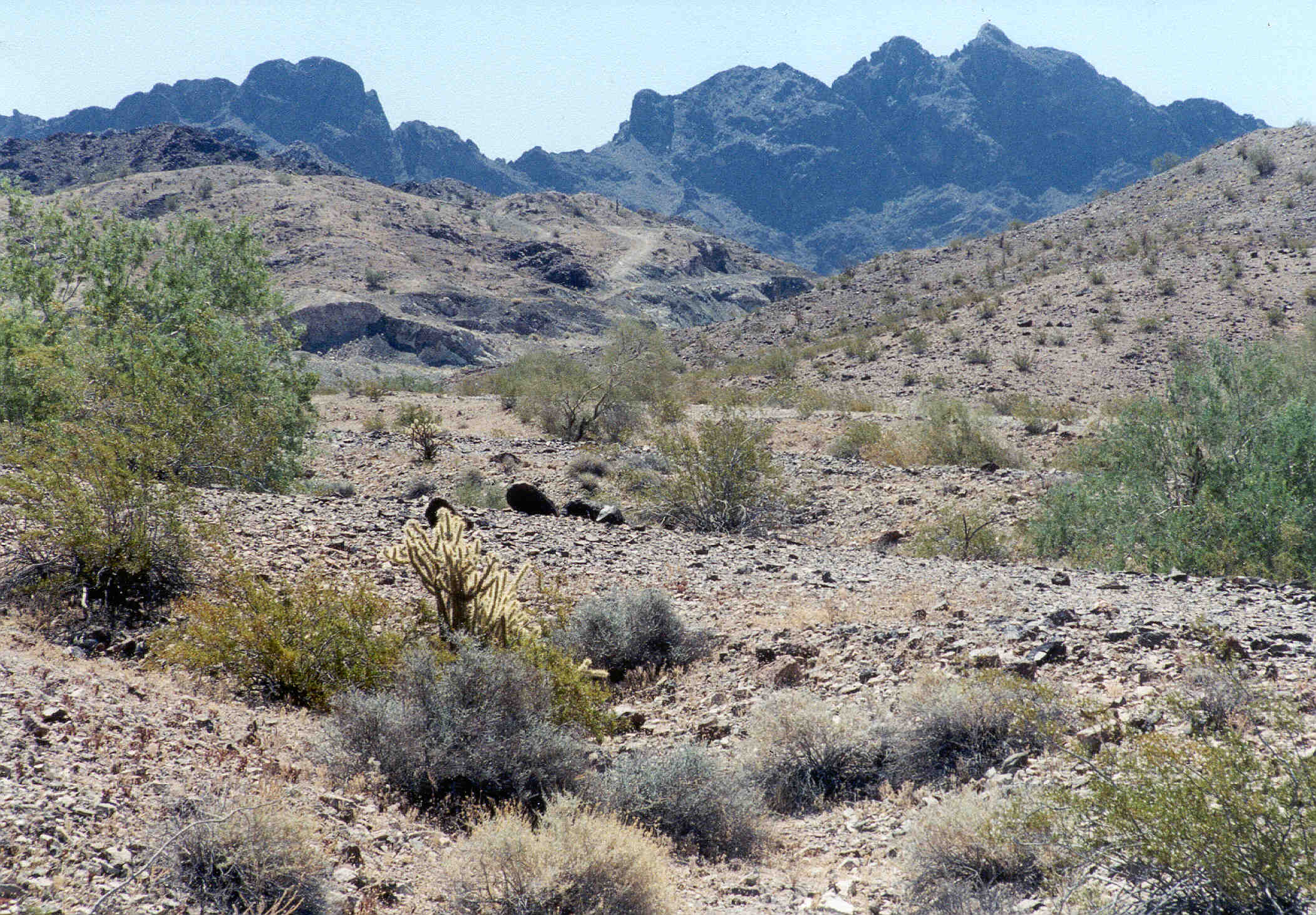
- A single Buckhorn Cholla-(2 meters), Creosote bushes-(Larrea tridentata), and two green Desert Ironwood trees-(Olneya tesota), North Trigo Peaks in the distance.

Highest point
- Peak: Coyote Peak
- Elevation: 2,808 ft (856 m)

Geography
- Location within Arizona
- Country: United States
- State: Arizona
- Range coordinates: 33°18′17″N 114°32′50″W

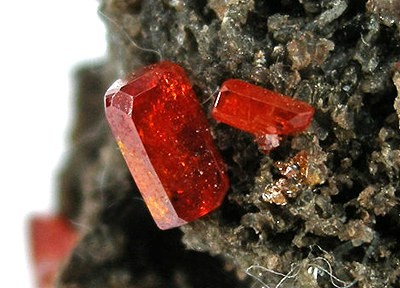
Vanadinite from the old Hamburg or Princess mine , Trigo Mountains

The Trigo Mountains are a north-south trending mountain range in La Paz County, Arizona, bordering the Colorado River on the east in the Lower Colorado River Valley. The range lies north of the Colorado River as it turns east, north of Martinez Lake and the Imperial Reservoir. The Trigo Mountains are on a north-south stretch of the Colorado River, and form the eastern perimeter of the Imperial National Wildlife Refuge.

Parts of the Trigo Mountains are included in the Trigo Mountains Wilderness and the Yuma Proving Ground.

== Specifics of the range ==
The Trigo Mountains are north-south trending with the northern and central range arcing to the northeast. The curving range parallels the similar-(half the size) curving range to the southeast, the Chocolate Mountains, and the arc-curving ranges would be presumed to be a resultant of the same time-framed thrust-faulting event during the formation of the Basin and Range Province.

The highest peak of the Trigos is Mohave Peak at 2,771 feet (845 m) in the southeast, isolated from the main trend of the range. The largest peak that terminates the mountain range in the north is unnamed, at 2,170 feet (661 m) as part of the North Trigo Peaks.

== Access ==
Access from the south is made at the Colorado River at Martinez Lake, and then a 4-wheel drive dirt road to the Red Cloud Mine. Access to the northern regions is more general, by way of the valley containing the Colorado River Indian Reservation on the east bank of the river in Arizona.

Blythe, California is 12 miles (19 km) northwest of the northern ranges; Yuma, Arizona-Winterhaven, California are about 25 miles (40 km) south of the central range.

== See also ==
- List of mountain ranges of La Paz County, Arizona
- List of mountain ranges of Arizona
- Trigo Mountains Wilderness
