= Lower Colorado River Valley =

Landform in Arizona and California

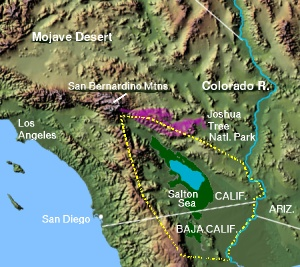
A section of the LCRV showing the Colorado Desert (yellow dotted line) in the west, the Salton Sea, and the three US bordering states on the Colorado River. Portions of the Mexican states of Baja California and Sonora also shown. Proximity to San Diego and the rain shadow of coastal mountains is also shown.

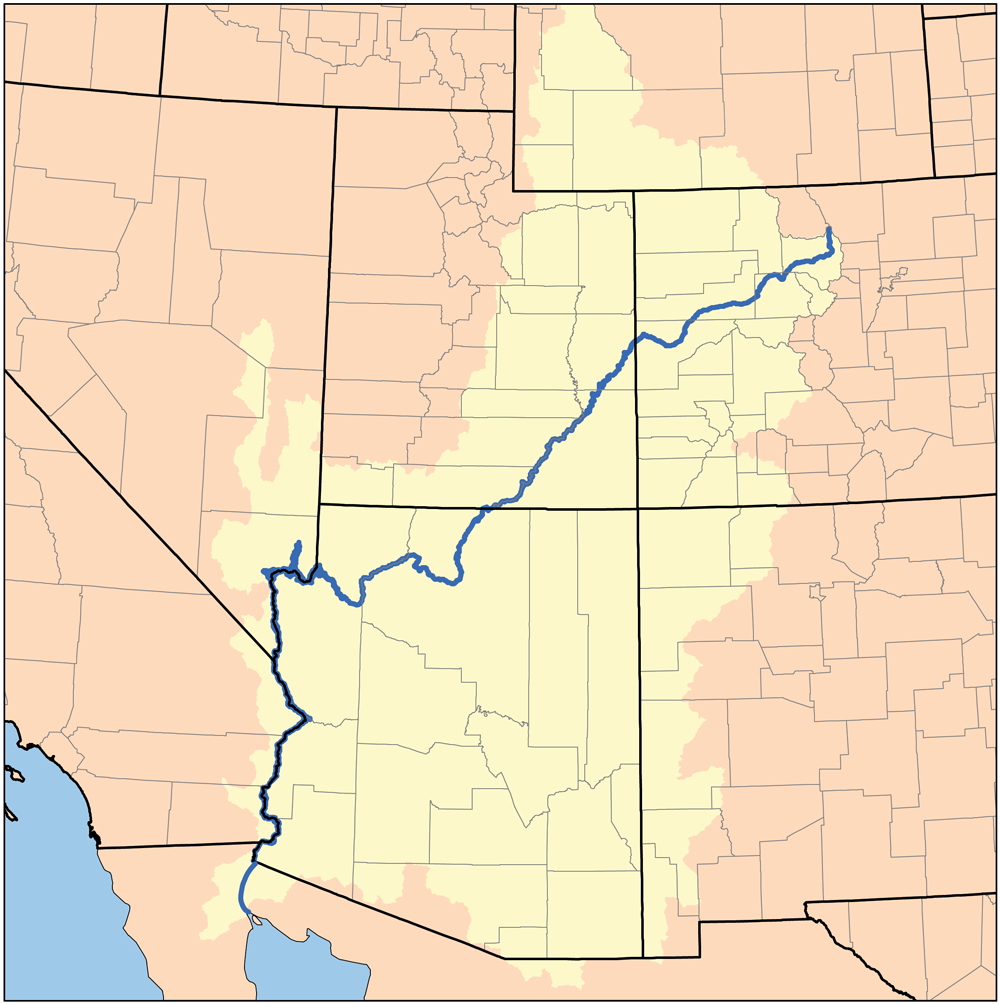
The Colorado River watershed; the LCRV arbitrarily starts south of Lake Mead, at Hoover Dam in Nevada.

The Lower Colorado River Valley (LCRV) is the river region of the lower Colorado River of the southwestern United States in North America that rises in the Rocky Mountains and has its outlet at the Colorado River Delta in the northern Gulf of California in northwestern Mexico, between the states of Baja California and Sonora. This north–south stretch of the Colorado River forms the border between the U.S. states of California/Arizona and Nevada/Arizona, and between the Mexican states of Baja California/Sonora.

It is commonly defined as the region from below Hoover Dam and Lake Mead to its outlet at the northern Gulf of California (Sea of Cortez); it includes the Colorado River proper, canyons, the valley, mountain ranges with wilderness areas, and the floodplain and associated riparian environments. It is home to recreation activities from the river, the lakes created by dams, agriculture, and the home of various cities, communities, and towns along the river, or associated with the valley region. Five Indian reservations are located in the LCRV: the Chemehuevi, Fort Mojave and Colorado River Indian Reservations; at Yuma are the Quechan and Cocopah reservations.

== Ecology ==
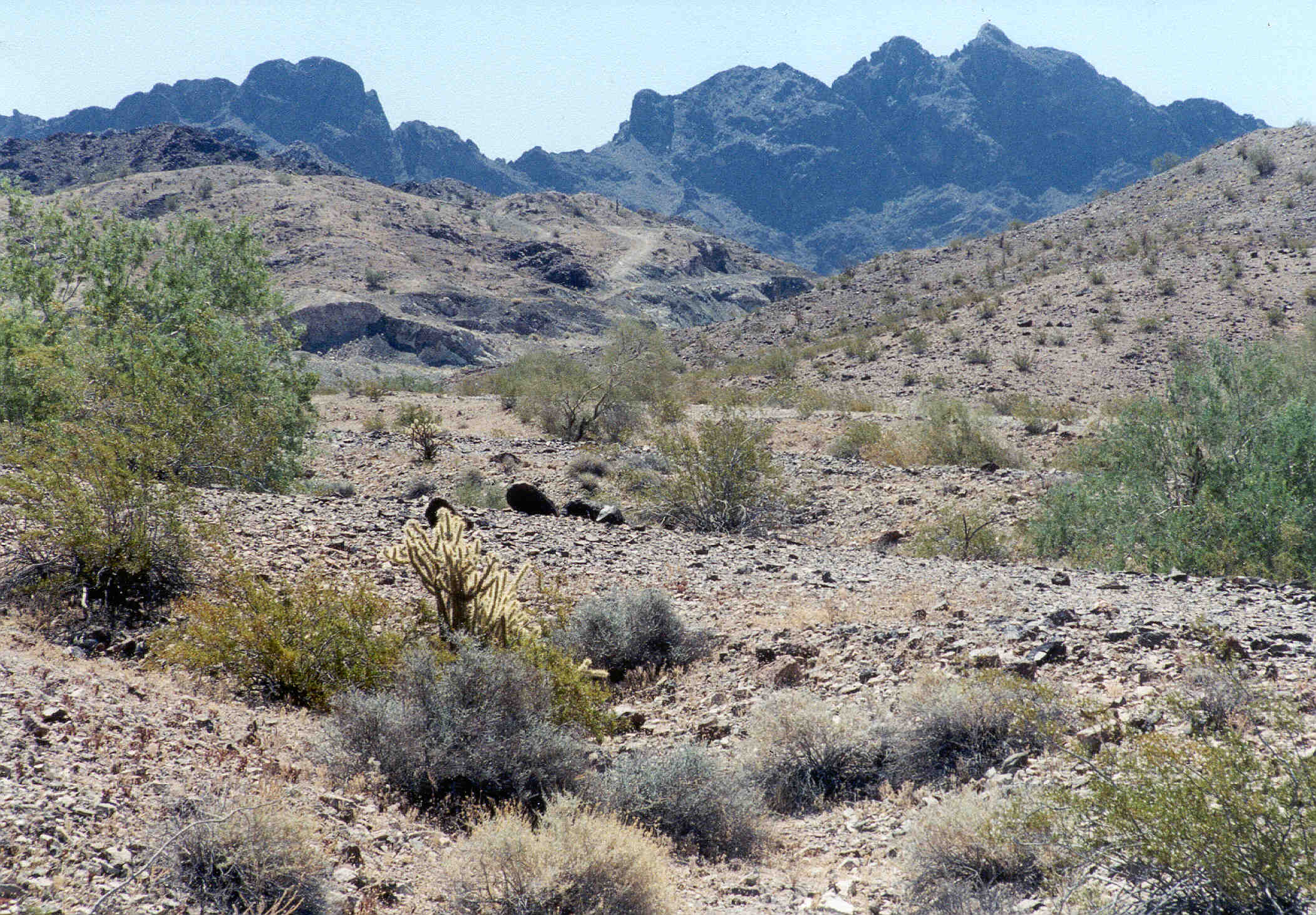
Trigo Mountains Wilderness, a ridgeline wilderness area on the eastern border of the river proper, 30 miles north of Yuma–Winterhaven. A buckhorn cholla cactus is in foreground; creosote bush scrubland on hillsides.

Some of the highest air temperatures in North America are recorded in the LCRV, rivaling Death Valley; specifically Bullhead City, Lake Havasu City, Laughlin, Needles, Yuma, or the southeastern deserts of California, west of the Colorado River where extreme heat is the main summertime weather feature. Worldwide, only deserts in Africa and in the Middle East are hotter. The LCRV is defined by three deserts. The Mojave Desert is in southeast California, southern Nevada, and northwest Arizona. South of the Mojave the Sonoran Desert spans both sides of the Colorado River. The Lower Colorado River Valley is in the western part of the Sonoran Desert, which is called the Colorado Desert. the Sonoran Desert region proper extends from areas west of the river, and then southeastwards to southeast Arizona, south along the eastern side of the Baja Peninsula cordillera to Baja California Sur, and southeast Sonora state, Mexico to the northern border of neighboring Sinaloa.

The LCRV extends about 350 miles (563 km) from Hoover Dam to the Colorado River Delta. The Sonoran Desert itself is more than twice as extensive north-to-south, and about 450 miles (724 km) in width. Two species, desert ironwood and the lesser long-nosed bat, have geographic ranges identical to the Sonoran Desert, and are indicator species of the Sonoran Desert region. The spring flowering of ironwood, and the bat species migration arrivals also become indicators of annual or multi-year climate trends for regions of the Sonoran Desert.

=== Flora ===
The Lower Colorado River Valley has unique plant communities because it is the most arid part of the desert and it has the highest temperatures, in excess of 120 °F (49 °C) during the summer. The low humidity means that most plants must have mechanisms that deal with severe water loss through evaporation. The soils tend to be typical desert soils, coarse and without well-developed organic horizons, and plants can only obtain soil water during and very soon after the infrequent rains.

Dominant plants in the valleys are low shrubs such as Ambrosia dumosa (white bursage) and Larrea tridentata (creosote bush). Over half of the floral diversity comprises annual species, with even higher percentages in drier habitats. Vulnerable species and plant communities include saltbush/wolfberry flats, saguaro, nightblooming cereus cacti, tamarisks, barrel cactus, Sonoran panicgrass, and acuna cactus (a subspecies of Sclerocactus johnsonii).

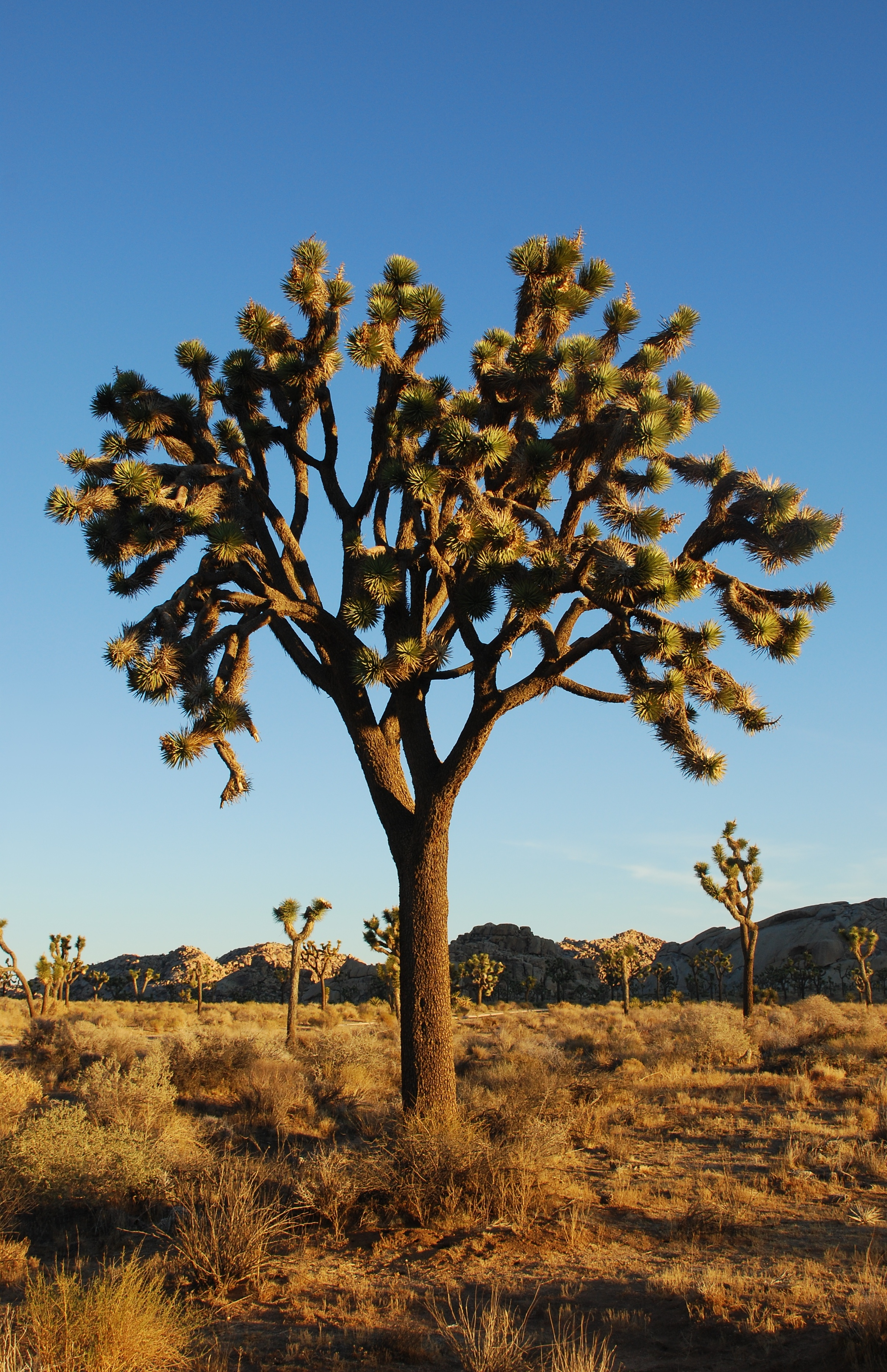
Yucca brevifolia (Joshua tree)

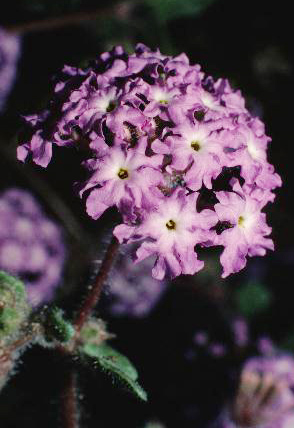
Abronia villosa (sand verbena)

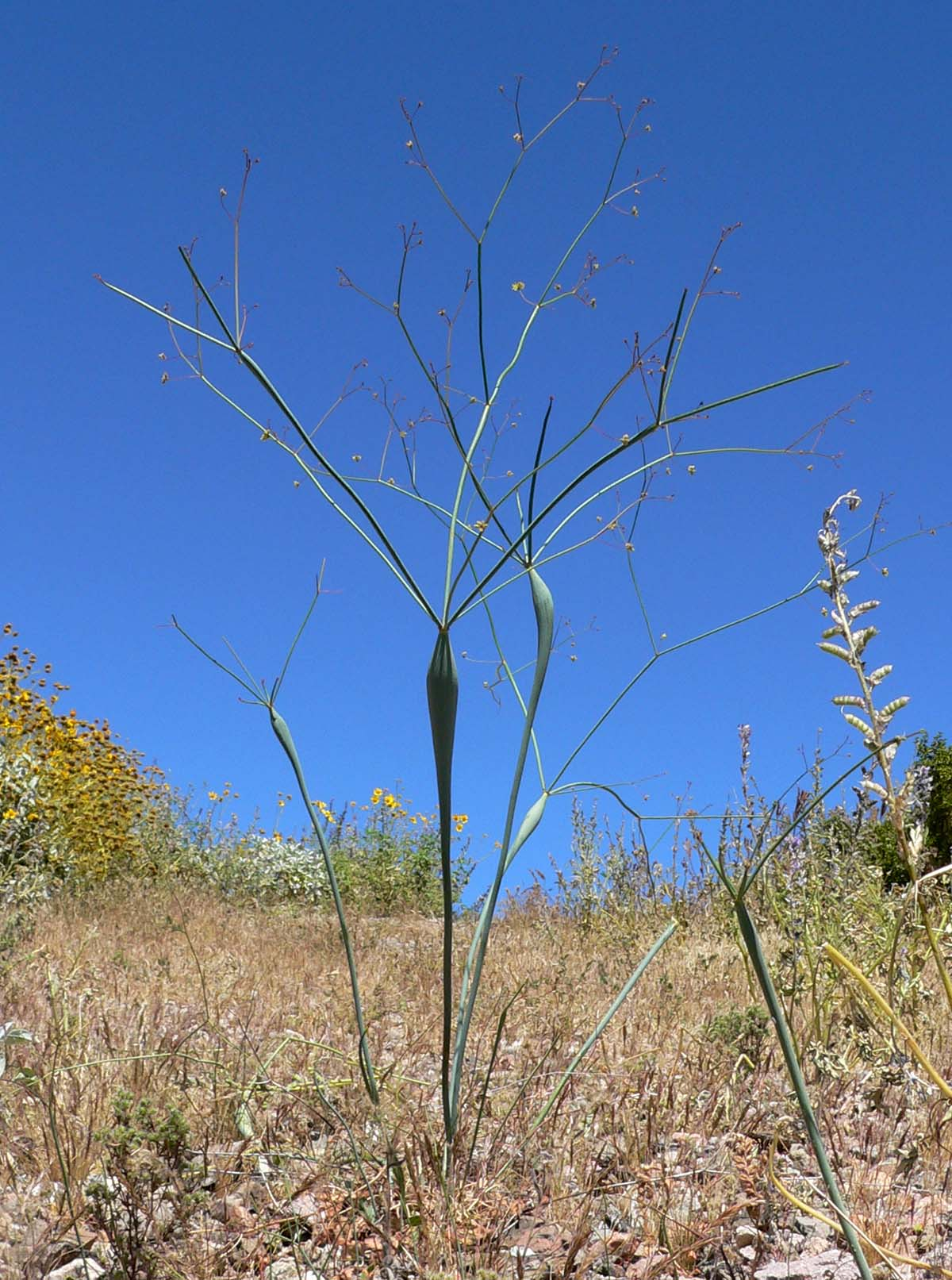
Eriogonum inflatum (desert trumpet)

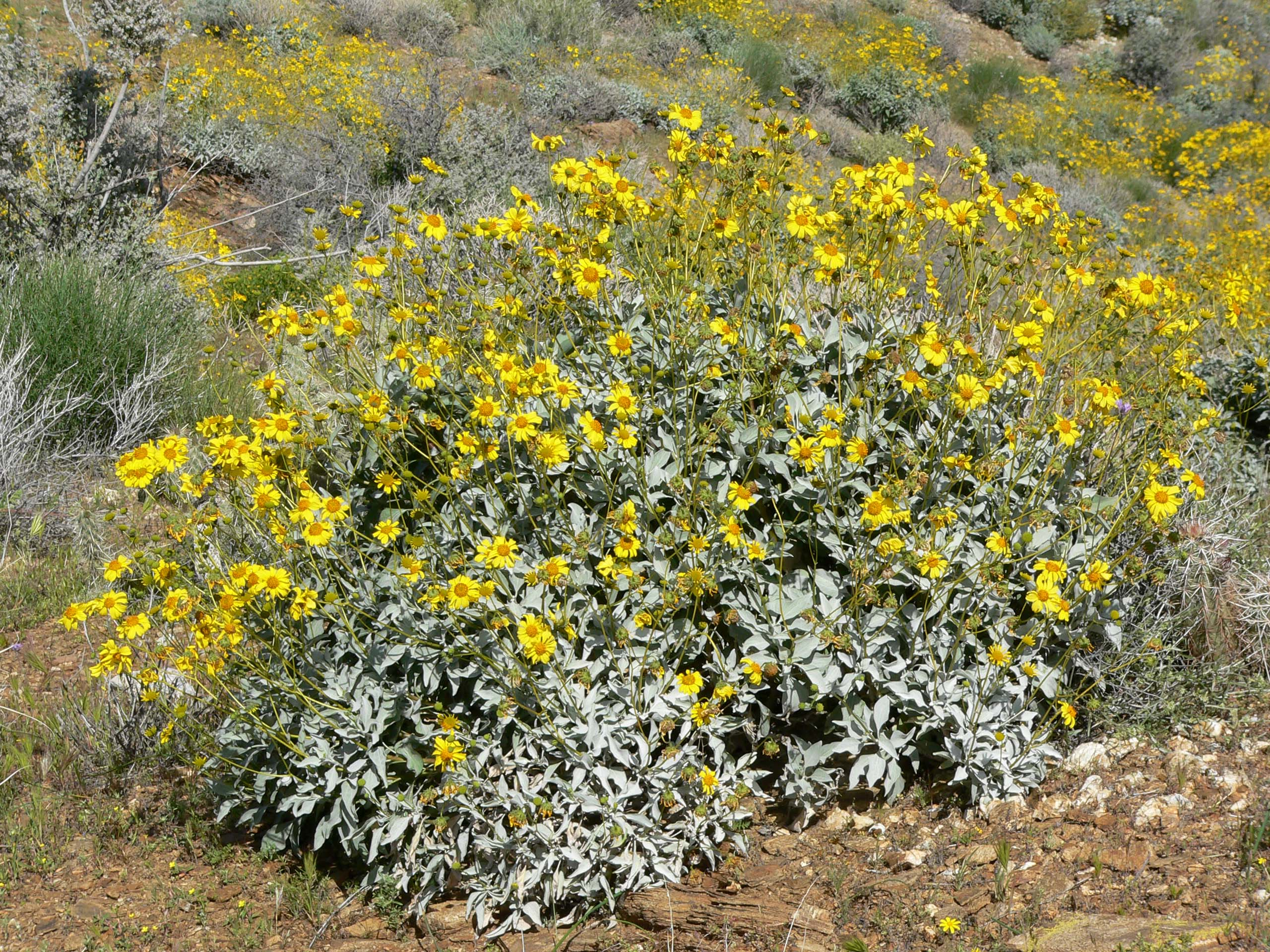
Encelia farinosa (brittlebush)

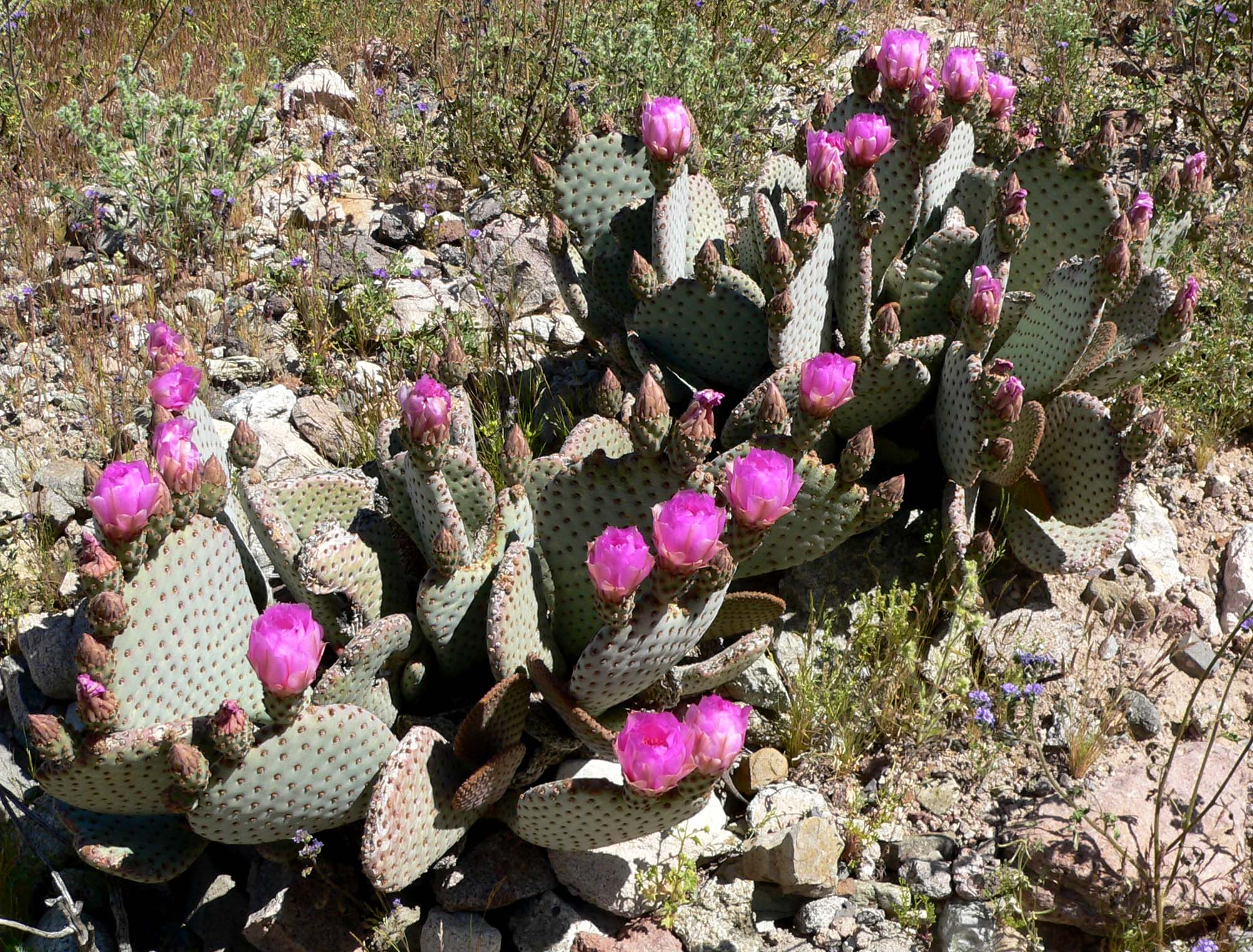
Opuntia basilaris

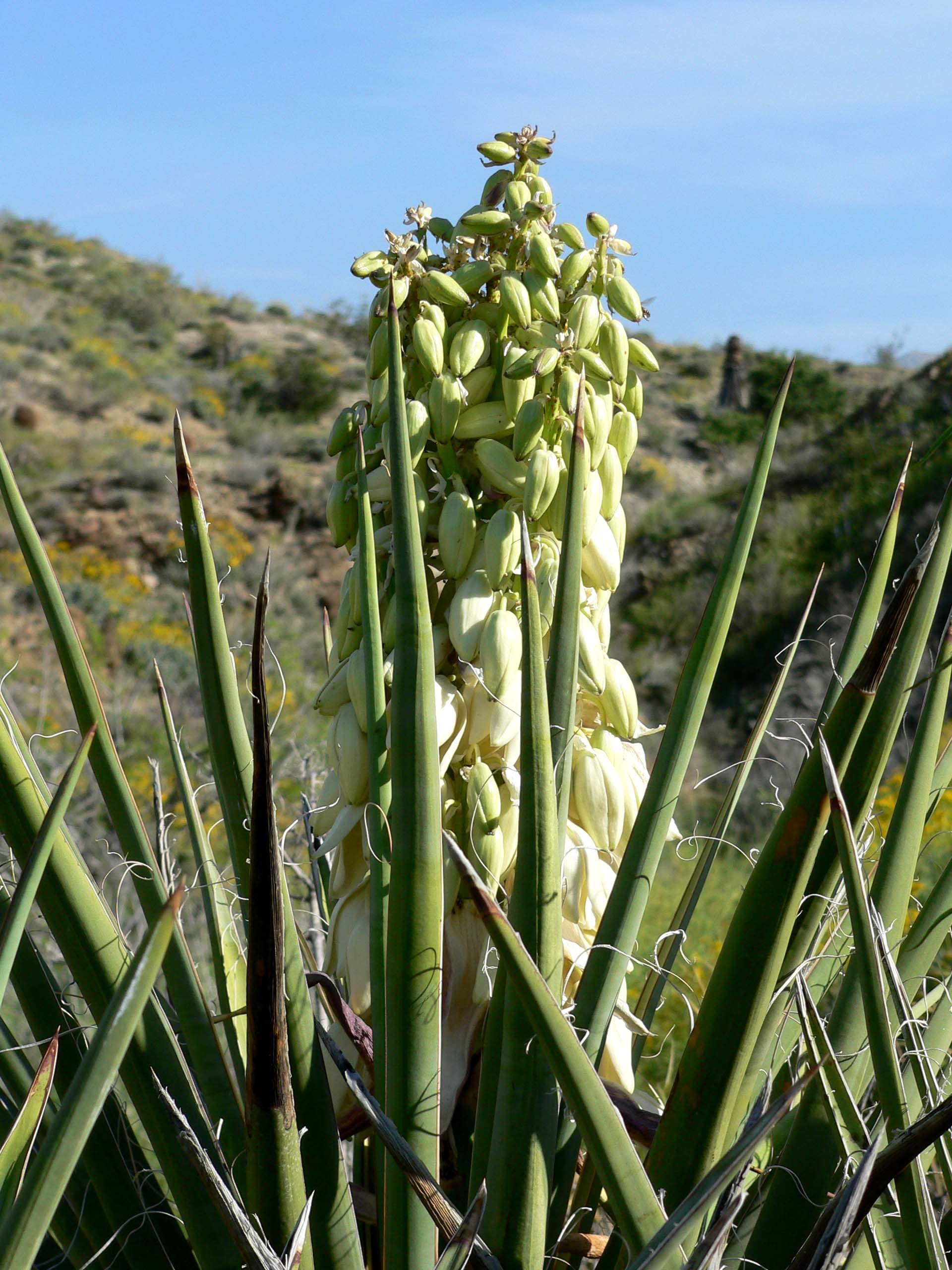
Yucca schidigera

=== Threats ===
The Lower Colorado River Valley subregion of the Sonoran Desert bioregion has multiple threats. Some major threats include urbanization, clearing of land for agriculture, human occupancy – especially as a result of imported external resources, and camping and camptrailers on BLM land. Other threats include harvesting for fuelwood, campfires, etc. of desert ironwood, destruction of land by offroad vehicles, especially in sand dunes, and harvesting and manipulation of groundwater.

== List of major cities and communities ==
- Laughlin, Nevada in Clark County, Nevada
- Needles, California in San Bernardino County
- Bullhead City, Arizona
- Mojave Valley, Arizona
- Lake Havasu City, Arizona
- Silver Cliffs, Arizona/California
- Vidal, California
- Parker, Arizona
- Blythe, California
- Quartzite, Arizona
- Winterhaven, California in Imperial County, California
- Yuma, Arizona in Yuma County, Arizona
- San Luis, Arizona
- San Luis Río Colorado, Sonora

== Complete list of towns, areas, etc, north to south ==
Nevada–California–Baja California side

- Cottonwood Cove, Nevada
- Lake Mohave
- Laughlin–Bullhead City
- Needles–Mohave Valley, AZ
- Sacramento Mountains
- Chemehuevi Mountains
- Chemehuevi Valley–(Lake Havasu City)
- Whipple Mountains
- Earp
- Big River
- Blythe–Quartzsite
- Winterhaven–Yuma
- Los Algodones, Baja California
- Colorado River Delta (at Gulf of California)

Arizona–Sonora side

- Willow Beach, Arizona
- Lake Mohave
- Bullhead City
- Mohave Valley, in Mohave County, Arizona
- Topock–Topock Marsh
- Lake Havasu City
- Bill Williams River
- Earp–Parker
- Quartzsite, in La Paz County, Arizona
- Ehrenberg
- Cibola
- Yuma in Yuma County, Arizona
- San Luis Río Colorado, Sonora
- Colorado River Delta (at Gulf of California)

=== Feeder-valleys, or included small valleys ===
Nevada–California–Baja California side

- Eldorado Valley–(endorheic)
- Piute Valley
- Laughlin–Bullhead City
- Needles–Mohave Valley, AZ
- Mohave Valley–(included)
- Sacramento Mountains
- Mohave Valley–(included)
- Chemehuevi Mountains
- Chemehuevi Valley–(Lake Havasu City)
- Whipple Mountains
- Vidal Valley
- Parker Valley–(included)
- Palo Verde Valley–(included)
- Colorado River Delta

Arizona–Sonora side

- Sacramento Valley–(Sacramento Wash)
- Mohave Valley–(included)
- (east of Whipple Mtns massif)–Bill Williams River–(Arizona)
  - Maria fold and thrust belt Region
- Parker Valley–(included)—La Posa Plain
- Ehrenberg, Arizona
- Cibola, Arizona
- Yuma Valley–(included)-Yuma, Arizona
- Colorado River Delta
