= Chocolate Mountains (Arizona) =

Mountain range of the Sonoran Desert

Coordinates: 33.1847584°N 114.3921694°W

The Chocolate Mountains of Arizona, USA, are located in the southwestern part of the state east of the Trigo Mountains and southwest of the Kofa National Wildlife Refuge. The mountains are located about 30 miles (48 km) east of the Chocolate Mountains of California, but the two ranges are not connected. The range in Arizona lies in a southwest-northeasterly direction west of Highway 95 on the U.S. Army Yuma Proving Ground. This area is patrolled by the Military Police from Marine Corps Air Station Yuma.

There is an historical mine.

== See also ==
The Chocolate Cliffs are one of several parallel lines of bluffs that form the Grand Staircase in Utah.
