= Vidal Valley =

Valley in the far eastern Colorado Desert

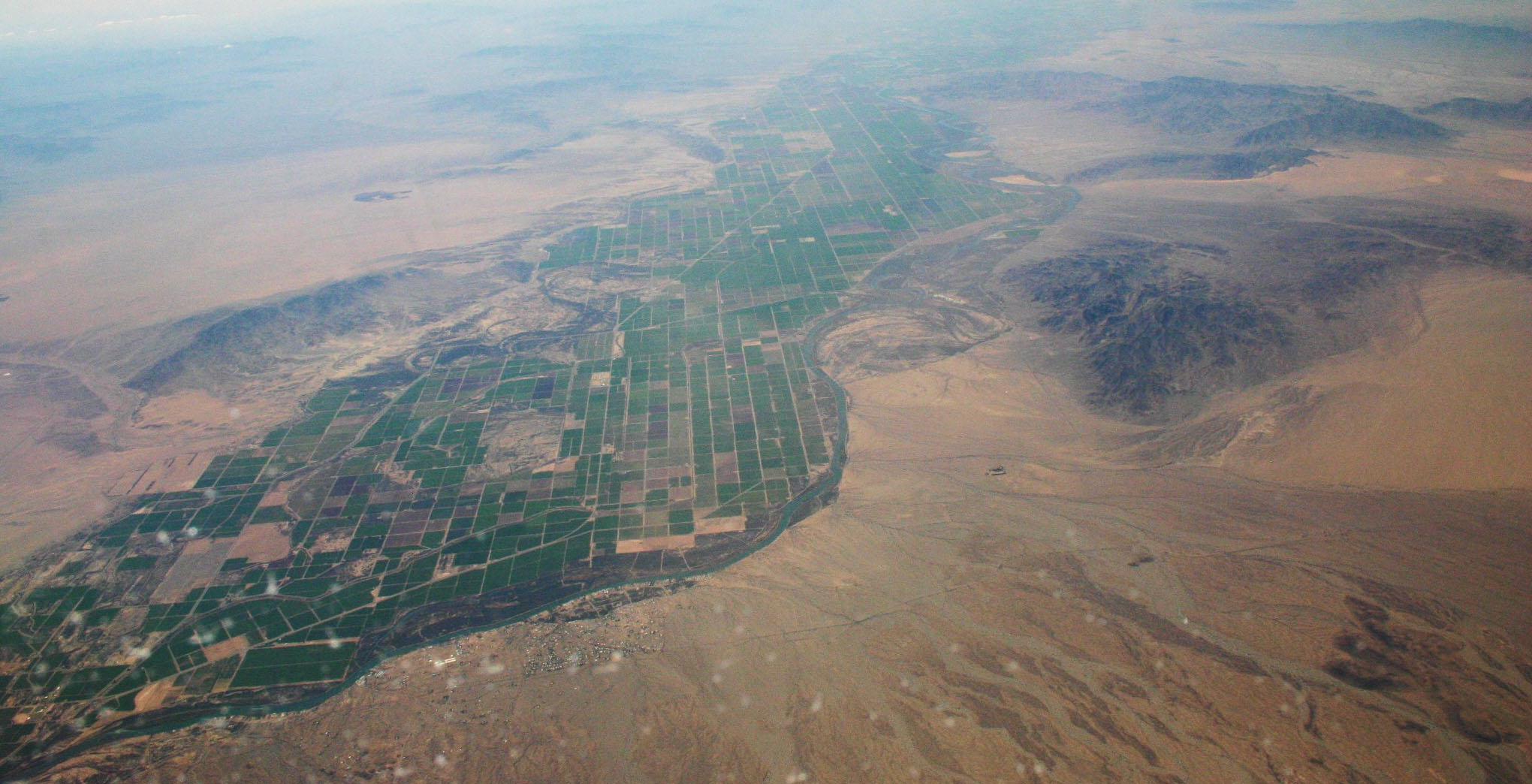
- (view to south); Aerial view of the Parker Valley, with the extreme southeast exit of Vidal Valley (photo, bottom right) into the Colorado River region (Parker Valley). Also shows Riverside Mountains & attached West Riverside Mountains at center right. The Big Maria Mountains are above at right (on horizon) to the south. The small mountain range across the Colorado River in Arizona (to the east) is the Mesquite Mountains.

- Location within southern California
- Length: 20 miles (32 km)
- Width: 10 miles (16 km)

Geography
- Location: San Bernardino County, CA & Riverside County, CA
- Population centers: Vidal Junction, Vidal, Rig River
- Coordinates: 34°11′20″N 114°34′26″W
- Rivers: Vidal Wash & Colorado River
- Interactive map of Vidal Valley

Vidal Valley is a 20-mile (32 km) long valley in the far eastern Colorado Desert bordering the Colorado River. Most of the valley is in eastern San Bernardino County, California, but the outfall on the Colorado River is in northeast Riverside County. Vidal Valley forms the large border of the south side of the east-west block of the Whipple Mountains massif, the landform that forces the Colorado to flow southeast, then back southwest. The southeast exit of the valley into Parker Valley on the Colorado River skirts the north end of the Riverside Mountains (see photo). The Colorado River Aqueduct crosses the midpoint of the valley at Vidal Junction, California. The Vidal Valley also lies due east of the Danby Dry Lake landform.

== Geography ==
Vidal Valley is bordered by the Whipple Mountains on the northeast and the Riverside Mountains on the south. The valley drains mostly northwest-to-southeast, with its outfall into a southwest-flowing section of the Colorado River. The north of the valley is bordered on the west by the Turtle Mountains, and the south side of the Chemehuevi Valley. The center point of the valley, both east-west and north-south is at Vidal Junction located at U.S. Route 95 in California and California State Route 62. Vidal Junction is located at 34°11′20″N 114°34′26″W.

=== Natural history ===
The Vidal Valley is in the climate, ecoregion, and plant community transition zone to the higher Mojave Desert on the north from the lower-elevation Colorado Desert on the south.

=== Watersheds ===
The Vidal Valley watershed enters the Colorado River opposite the Bouse Wash Watershed in western Arizona. Both watersheds enter the Parker Valley, mostly occupied by the Colorado River Indian Reservation. As desert washes, typically little or no water flows at the outfall points into the Colorado River, except during rainstorm events. Both the Vidal Valley and the Bouse Wash are in the north of the Imperial Reservoir Watershed.

The headwater region of the valley is north of Vidal Junction; the water divide is east of the Turtle Mountains, and due west of the east-west trending Whipple Mountains block. North of the water divide is the southside of Chemehuevi Valley and Chemehuevi Wash.

== See also ==
- Lower Colorado River Valley
- Tyson Wash, (adjacent Bouse Wash)
