= Rice Valley =

Landform in Riverside County, Arizona

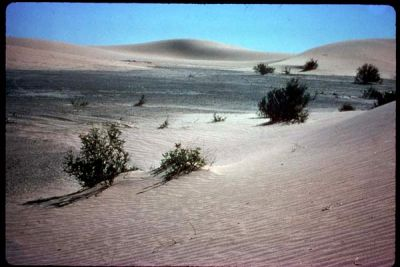
- Sand dune region in Rice Valley Wilderness

- Location within California
- Length: 22 miles (35 km)
- Width: 15 miles (24 km)

Geography
- Location: Riverside County, California, United States
- Borders on: Little Maria Mountains-SW; Arica Mountains(minor range)-W; Danby Dry Lake & Ward Valley (California)-NNW; Turtle Mountains CA-N; West Riverside Mountains-NE & E "Big Wash"-E; Big Maria Mountains-SE & S
- Coordinates: 34°05′01″N 114°50′59″W
- Interactive map of Rice Valley

The Rice Valley is a valley of the southeastern Mojave Desert, located within Riverside County, California.

== Geography ==
Rice Valley is a mostly endorheic valley filled with bajadas from neighboring mountain ranges draining into Rice Dry Lake, and sand dune fields formed by northwest and westerly winds.

In the non-endorheic southeast region of Rice Valley the small drainage named Big Wash seasonally flows out between the Big Maria Mountains on the south, and the West Riverside Mountains on the north, to its mouth on the Colorado River on the west side of the Parker Valley.

The endorheic Ward Valley, adjacent on the northwest, has Danby Dry Lake as its low point. Southwest across neighboring mountain ranges are the endorheic Palen Valley with Palen Dry Lake as its lowpoint, and Chuckwalla Valley with Ford Dry Lake as its lowpoint.

California State Route 62 is an east/west highway passing through the valley.

=== Rice Valley Wilderness Area ===
The Rice Valley Wilderness Area is within Rice Valley, managed by the Bureau of Land Management-BLM. The Big Maria Mountains Wilderness Area is adjacent on the southeast.

== History ==
The Rice Army Airfield is an abandoned World War II airfield of the Desert Training Center in the valley. It was the proposed site of the Rice Solar Energy Project, put on indefinite hold in 2014.

The former Rice Shoe Tree was located in Rice, a former town around a Santa Fe Railroad siding in the valley. The Shoe Tree burned down in 2003, and was 'replaced' by the present day 'Rice Shoe Garden' along a fence.

== See also ==
- List of valleys of the Lower Colorado River Valley
- Valleys of the Mojave Desert
