= Ward Valley (California) =

Valley of far eastern San Bernardino County, California

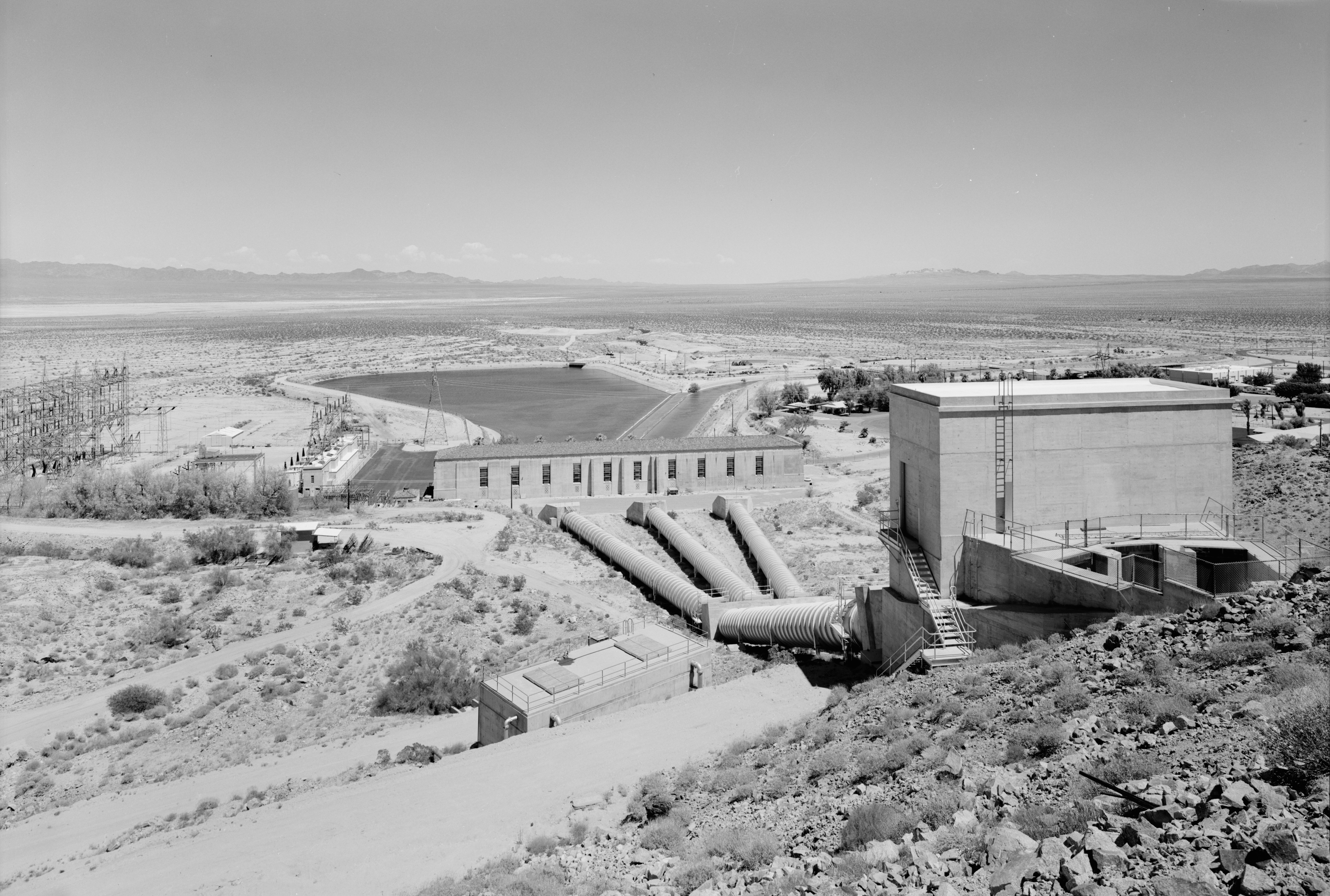
- Danby Dry Lake in south region of Ward Valley, from the Iron Mountain Pump Plant

- Location within California
- Floor elevation: 709 ft (216 m)
- Length: 55 mi (89 km)
- Width: 9 mi (14 km)

Geography
- Location: San Bernardino County, California, United States
- Population centers: Milligan, CA; Mountain Springs Summit, California; Goffs, CA; Rice, CA
- Borders on: Old Woman Mountains-W; Piute Mountains-W & NW; Sacramento Wash (California)-N; Bigelow Cholla Garden Wilderness-NE; Sacramento Mountains (California)-ENE; Stepladder Mountains-E; Turtle Mountains (California)-E & SE; Rice Valley & Arica Mountains-SSE; Granite Mountains (California)-S & SSW; Iron Mountains (California)-SW; Cadiz Dunes Wilderness-SW & W
- Coordinates: 34°16′18″N 115°04′44″W
- Interactive map of Ward Valley (California)

The Ward Valley (California) is a lengthy, almost-true north-south-trending valley in far-eastern San Bernardino County, California.

The south end of the valley expands slightly northwest-by-southeast, and contains Danby Dry Lake, a 13-mi (21 km) long dry lake, or playa. Mountain ranges surround the valley on all sides. The neighboring valleys eastward over the mountain ranges, Chemehuevi Valley, Vidal Valley, and Rice Valley, are all western tributary valleys to the south-flowing Colorado River along the Lower Colorado River Valley corridor.

The center of the valley is approximately just east of the Oro Plata Mine at the east of the Old Woman Mountains. The Iron Mountains with the Iron Mountain Pump Plant of the Colorado River Aqueduct lie on the southwest margin of the valley.

== Geography ==
Ward Valley contains the three dry lake beds, from west to east: Bristol Lake, Cadiz Dry Lake, and Danby Lake.

Geographically, the entire region of Ward Valley is a transition from higher-elevation bajadas and mountain ranges of the Mojave Desert to lower-elevation sections of Mojave Desert- and the northwest region of the Sonoran Desert in southeast California, called the Colorado Desert. The region has mostly arid mountain ranges, bajadas, flatlands, sand dune fields (from prevailing, seasonal winds), and playas (salt flats).

The lengthy north section of Ward Valley is drained by one major wash, named Homer Wash. Its outfall end, due to scant rainfall, and distance from Danby Lake, ends about 5 mi (8.0 km) from the north side of the lake, as a result of ground infiltration.

== See also ==
- Rice Valley
- Danby Lake
- Valleys of San Bernardino County
