= Mopah Range =

Landform in San Bernardino County, California

- Location within California

Highest point
- Elevation: 923 m (3,028 ft)

Geography
- Country: United States
- State: California
- District: San Bernardino County
- Range coordinates: 34°16′23″N 114°44′19″W
- Topo map: USGS Savahia Peak SW

The Mopah Range is a desert mountain range, in the Lower Colorado River Valley region, in southeastern San Bernardino County, California.

== Geography ==
The Mopah Range are located directly adjacent to and linked with the larger Turtle Mountains Range. They are in the northern Colorado Desert region of the Sonoran Desert, and the southern reach of Mojave Desert.

The Colorado River and Whipple Mountains are to the east, and the Iron Mountains to the west. Vidal Junction, California is to the southeast, and the Colorado River Aqueduct passes to the south.

== Turtle Mountains Wilderness Area ==
The Mopah Range is part of the Turtle Mountains Wilderness Area. The Mopahs include broad bajadas to highly eroded volcanic peaks, spires, and cliffs. The Mopah Range contains the two signature Mopah Peaks, which are rhyodactic or volcanic plugs. The northernmost peak is a landmark known as Mexican Hat. The area has numerous springs and seeps. The Mopahs are considered part of the greater Lower Colorado River Valley region.

=== Natural history ===
The Mopah Range is located in an ecological transition zone between the Mojave Desert (High Desert) and Colorado Desert region of the Sonoran Desert (Low Desert) and therefore contains a high diversity of plant and animal species. The Turtle Mountain range is a northern or southern 'delimiter of occurrence' for some species; for example the endangered California fan palm (Washingtonia filifera) encounters the northern limit of its range in the Mopah-Turtle Mountains.

Dominate vegetation in the Turtle Mountains Wilderness Area consists of the creosote bush-bur sage with creosote bush (Larrea tridentata) and the palo verde-cactus shrub ecosystems with the palo verde tree (Parkinsonia microphylla). In the washes, Colorado/Sonoran microphylla woodlands can be found. These woodlands include such things as smoke tree (Psorothamnus spinosus), honey mesquite (Prosopis velutina), and catclaw (Acacia greggii).

Wildlife species include desert bighorn sheep, coyote, black-tailed jackrabbits, ground squirrels, kangaroo rats, quail, roadrunners, golden eagles, prairie falcons, rattlesnakes, the desert tortoise and several species of lizards.

=== Recreation ===
Hiking, horseback riding, camping, rock hounding, photography, and backpacking can be enjoyed in this wilderness. The area is popular with rock hounding hobbyists and is nationally known for chalcedony specimens in a form known as "Mopah roses". Coffin, Mopah, and Mohawk Springs, natural palm oases, are popular hiking destinations.
