= Water tunnel (physical infrastructure) =

Below-ground channels used to transport water

Water tunnels are tunnels (below-ground channels) used to transport water to areas with large populations or agriculture. They are frequently part of aqueducts. Some aqueducts, such as the Delaware Aqueduct are single long tunnels. In other cases, such as the San Jacinto Tunnel on the Colorado River Aqueduct, water tunnels form parts of far longer aqueducts. In cases where the outflow of a water tunnel is into an existing stream or river flowing to the point of water use, the term aqueduct is less likely to be used, as with the Harold D. Roberts Tunnel from Dillon Reservoir to the North Fork South Platte River.

== Notable water tunnels, or systems including water tunnels ==
- Alva B. Adams Tunnel from the western slope of the Colorado River drainage system

to the eastern Front Range of Colorado, 13.1 miles (21.1 km)

- Angeles Tunnel 7.2 miles (11.6 km)
- Bagur Navile Tunnel 6 miles (9.7 km)
- Bosporus Water Tunnel 3.4 miles (5.5 km)
- Chicago Tunnel and Reservoir Plan 109.4 miles (176.1 km)
- Denver Water
  - Moffat Tunnel 6.2 miles (10.0 km)
  - Harold D. Roberts Tunnel from Dillon Reservoir 23.3 miles (37.5 km)
- Dingshan Tunnel on the Irtysh–Karamay–Ürümqi Canal (China) 4.6 miles 7.4 km
- Metropolitan Water District of Southern California
  - San Jacinto Tunnel on the Colorado River Aqueduct 13 mi (21 km)
- New York City water supply system
  - Catskill Aqueduct 28 miles (45 km) of grade tunnel, 35 miles (56 km) of pressure tunnel.
  - Delaware Aqueduct 85 miles (137 km)
  - New York City Water Tunnel No. 3 60 miles (97 km)
- Päijänne Water Tunnel, 75 miles (121 km), is one of the longest tunnels in the world and the primary source of fresh water in Helsinki and its suburbs
- Saksahan Derivation Tunnel, 3.3 miles (5.3 km), connects Saksahan reservoirs and Inhulets river, bypassing Northern and Southern quarries under downtown Kryvyi Rih
- San Juan–Chama Project
  - Azotea Tunnel 12.8 miles (20.6 km)
- The Inter-reservoirs Transfer Scheme (IRTS), 1.74 miles (2.80 km), provides fresh water for Kwai Chung and Sha Tin neighborhoods in New Territories of Hong Kong

== See also ==
- Canal tunnel
- Culvert
- Qanat
