= Arica Mountains =

Landform in Riverside County, California

- Location within California

Highest point
- Elevation: 659 m (2,162 ft)

Dimensions
- Length: 2.5 mi (4.0 km) NNW
- Width: 1 mi (1.6 km) E-W

Geography
- Country: United States
- State: California
- District: Riverside County
- Range coordinates: 34°1′29″N 114°56′1″W
- Topo map: USGS Arica Mountains

The Arica Mountains are a small mountain range in northern Riverside County, California. The range lies along the south edge of Rice Valley 6.2 miles (10.0 km) southwest of the old Rice townsite on California State Route 62. They lie 6 miles (9.7 km) north of the Little Maria Mountains and 9 miles (14 km) southwest of the Turtle Mountains. The Granite Mountains lie about 8 miles to the west. They are in the Colorado Desert, in the Lower Colorado River Valley region. They are north the Palen Mountains and Big Maria Mountains; and northwest of Blythe, California.

== Palen/McCoy Wilderness Area ==
The southwest portion of the Arica Mountains lies within the Palen/McCoy Wilderness Area. managed by the Bureau of Land Management.

Within the Palen-McCoy Wilderness are the Arica, Granite, Palen, Little Maria, and McCoy Mountains, which are five distinct mountain ranges separated by broad sloping alluvial fans-bajadas. Because this large area incorporates so many major geological features, the diversity of vegetation and landforms is exceptional. The desert wash woodland found here provides food and cover for burro deer, coyote, bobcat, gray fox, and mountain lion. Desert pavement, bajadas, interior valleys, canyons, dense ironwood forests, canyons and rugged peaks form a constantly changing landscape pattern.
