= Riverside Mountains =

Mountain range in California, United States

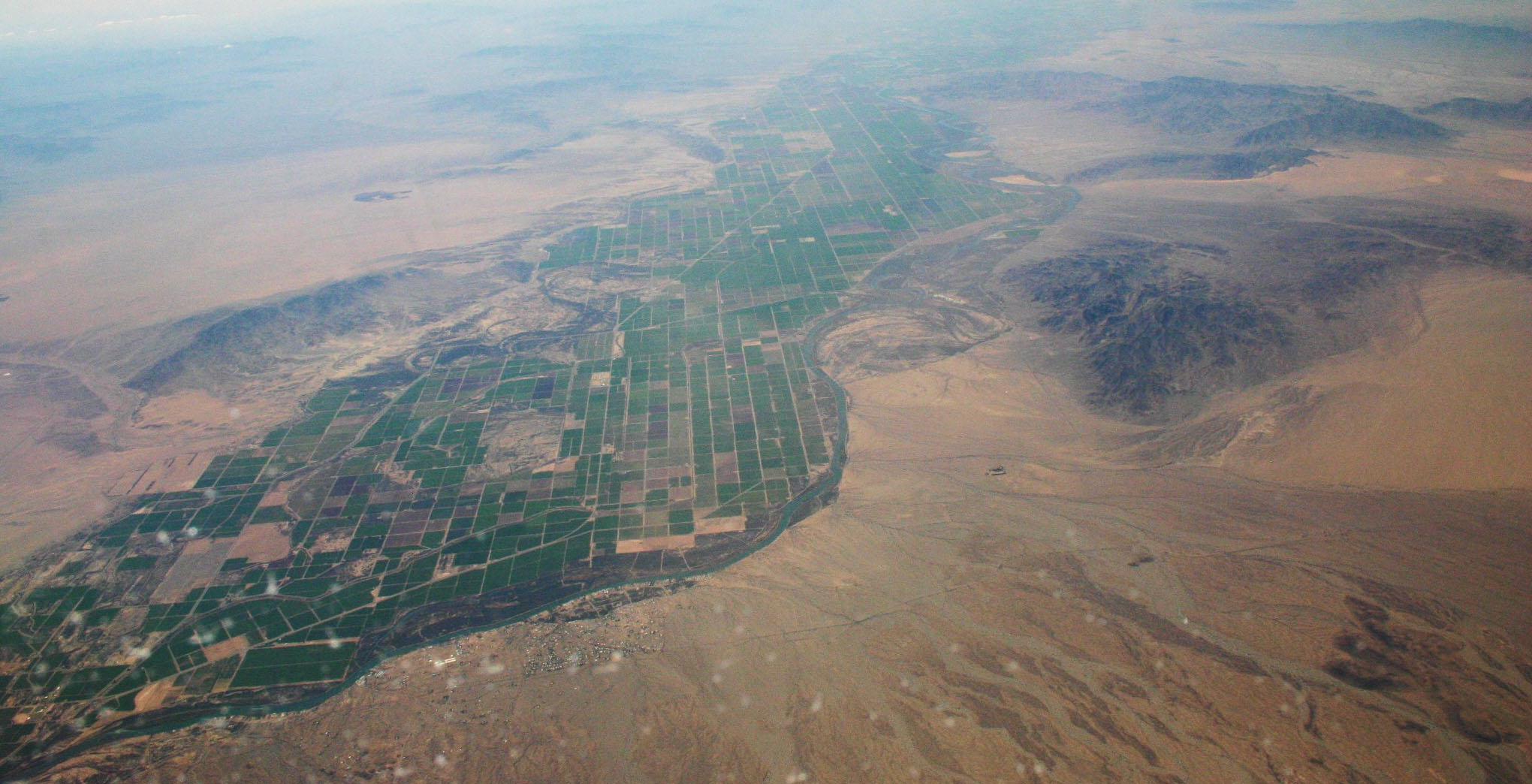
- (view to south); Aerial view of Riverside Mountains at center right-(the West Riversides are just to right (out of view) but attached to the south of the Riversides). The Big Maria Mountains are above at right (on horizon) to the south. The small mountain range across the Colorado River in Arizona (to the east) is the Mesquite Mountains.

Highest point
- Elevation: 2,252 ft (686 m)

Geography
- Location within California
- Country: United States
- State: California
- Regions: Colorado Desert and Sonoran Desert)
- County: Riverside County
- Municipality: Vidal Junction
- Range coordinates: 34°1′23.058″N 114°32′28.851″W
- Topo map: USGS Vidal

The Riverside Mountains are a mountain range in Riverside County, California. The town of Vidal, California is located in the West Riverside Mountains.

== Geography ==
The Riverside Mountains are in the Colorado Desert, in the Lower Colorado River Valley region. They are southeast of the Turtle Mountains and north of the Big Maria Mountains, and the Colorado River borders its eastern perimeter. The high point of the range is 2,252 feet (686 m).

== Riverside Mountains Wilderness ==
The Riverside Mountains Wilderness was established in 1994 and is managed by the Bureau of Land Management. The Colorado River parallels this 24,004 acre wilderness on its eastern edge.

The landscape varies from gently sloping bajadas to steep, rugged interiors. Washes emerging from canyons divide the bajadas below. Numerous peaks in the Riverside Mountains give this small range a rough, craggy appearance. Two sensitive plant species, the foxtail cactus and California barrel cactus; and a small herd of Burro deer (Odocoileus hemionus eremicus) live in the Riverside range.

== Geology ==
=== Maria Fold and Thrust Belt ===
The Riverside Mountains are one of several ranges that constitute the Maria Fold and Thrust Belt (MFTB). The Maria Fold and Thrust Belt underwent generally thick-skinned (involving basement rocks) north–south-trending crustal shortening in the Cretaceous. The structures of the MFTB are exposed by to later generally east–west-trending large-scale crustal extension in the Miocene, through what is known to geologists as the Colorado River Extensional Corridor. This north–south shortening is anomalous, as crustal shortening in the rest of the North American Cordillera is oriented generally east–west because of the generally east–west compression that was due to the subduction of the Farallon plate under western North America. Also unlike the rest of the North American Cordillera, deformation in the Maria Fold and Thrust Belt involved rocks of the North American Craton, most notably the Grand Canyon sequence of sedimentary rocks.

=== Rocks ===
The Riverside Mountains contain rocks from both the lower and upper plates of a large detachment fault and metamorphic core complex system as a result of the Miocene-age extension. The lower plate consists of a stack of metamorphosed units, which comprise Jurassic metavolcanics, the metamorphosed Grand Canyon sequence, the metamorphosed McCoy Mountains Formation and related Mesozoic rocks, and the Precambrian basement. The upper plate of the detachment fault consists of a small sedimentary basin containing Tertiary-age syntectonic (deposited during tectonic activity) volcanic units, conglomerates, and other sedimentary rocks.

== See also ==
- West Riverside Mountains
- Category:Flora of the California desert regions
- Category:Protected areas of the Colorado Desert
- Category:Wilderness areas within the Lower Colorado River Valley
- Category:Bureau of Land Management areas in California
