= Granite Mountains (Riverside County, California) =

Landform in Riverside County, California

- Location within California

Highest point
- Elevation: 1,326 m (4,350 ft)

Geography
- Country: United States
- State: California
- District: Riverside County
- Range coordinates: 33°58′13″N 115°04′22″W
- Topo map: USGS Palen Pass

The Granite Mountains are a mountain range in northern Riverside County, California, United States. The range is east of Joshua Tree National Park, and is one of four mountain ranges in the Mojave Desert to share this name. The range is about 12 miles northwest to southeast, and about 4 miles wide. It is in the Palen/McCoy Wilderness, administered by the Bureau of Land Management.

== Geography ==
The range is in the southeast part of the Granite Pass USGS topographic quadrangle map, in the southwest part of East of Granite Pass, the northeast corner of West of Palen Pass, and the northern part of Palen Pass. The range is east of the Coxcomb Mountains in Joshua Tree Wilderness, south of Iron Mountain, West of the Arica Mountains and the Little Maria Mountains, and north of the Palen Mountains. The high point is 4351 feet above sea level, at 33.9701741N, -115.0728024W.

== Geology ==
As mapped by Stone, Miller, and others, Granite Mountain is largely underlain by Cretaceous, sphene-biotite, porphyritic, granodiorite. It is moderately to strongly foliated and contains euhedral phenocrysts of light-gray potassium feldspars. The feldspar phenocrysts are 0.8 to 4 in (2.0 to 10.2 cm) long and exhibit distinctive concentric zones of mafic mineral inclusions. Sills, dikes, and lenses of strongly foliated to unfoliated leucogranite intrude the granodiorite. In the northern part of Granite Mountain, the granodiorite contains vertical to steeply inclined roof pendants of porphyritic biotite-hornblende granodiorite gneiss, tonalite gneiss, and quartz diorite gneiss. The age of these gneisses are either Mesozoic or Proterozoic.

== Biology ==
Little has been published on the flora and fauna of these mountains. A hiker's blog mentions Parkinsonia (palo verde) and Yucca. The Calflora database lists Brassica tournefortii (Saharan mustard), Crossidium squamiferum, Fouquieria splendens (ocotillo), Grimmia orbicularis, Juniperus californica (California juniper), and Stillingia spinulosa (broad leaved stillingia). One document notes that these mountains are part of the range for desert bighorn sheep (Ovis canadensis nelsoni).
