= Rice Solar Energy Project =

Proposed solar power facility project for Rice Valley

- Country: United States
- Location: Riverside County, California
- Coordinates: 34°4′0″N 114°48′30″W
- Status: Proposed
- Construction cost: $750 million

Solar farm
- Type: CSP
- CSP technology: Solar power tower
- Site resource: 2,598 kWh/m^{2}/yr

Power generation
- Nameplate capacity: 150 MW
- Capacity factor: 34%
- Annual net output: 450 GW·h

External links
- Website: www.ricesolarenergy.com

The Rice Solar Energy Project was a 150 MW concentrating solar power facility project proposed for Rice Valley in the southern Mojave Desert, within Riverside County in southern California, United States. It was put on indefinite hold in 2014.

== Description ==
Proposed by Rice Solar, a subsidiary of SolarReserve, the thermal power tower facility would have been located on 1,410 acres (570 ha) of private land on the site of the former Rice Army Airfield, near the former settlement of Rice.

The project's innovative molten salt storage system was to capture solar energy and deliver power to the grid even after the sun goes down. The facility was "expected to power 68,000 homes, create up to 450 construction jobs, and generate more than $48 million in state and local tax revenue over the first 10 years of operation."

=== Details ===
The project was developed by Rice Solar Energy, LLC, a subsidiary of SolarReserve, LLC. The facility would have consisted of about 17,000 heliostats focused onto a central receiver tower with an overall height of 653 feet (199 m), and an integrated thermal storage system, which uses molten salt, a mixture of sodium nitrate and potassium nitrate, as heat carrier. The power plant would have been located on 1,410 acres (570 ha) of private land, with previously disturbed and natural habitat sections.

The project had undergone extensive environmental review and had proposed mitigations for environmental impacts from its construction and operation. SolarReserve was to fund the acquisition and enhancement of 1,522 acres (616 ha) to compensate for impacts to desert tortoise habitat on private and public land.

In December 2011, Secretary of the Interior Ken Salazar approved a transmission line, access road and substation on public lands that will connect the Rice project to the power grid in California.

In January 2013, the California Public Utilities Commission (CPUC) approved SolarReserve's amended 25-year power purchase agreement (PPA) with Pacific Gas and Electric (PG&E).

=== Indefinite hold ===
As of October 2014, SolarReserve put the Rice Solar Project on "indefinite hold". The reason was the investment tax credit for renewable energy slated to drop from 30 percent to 10 percent at the end of 2016, and only available for projects that are fully online by then."

== See also ==
- Solar power in the Mojave Desert
