= West Riverside =

West Riverside may refer to:

- West Riverside, New Orleans, a neighborhood of New Orleans, Louisiana
- West Riverside, Montana
- West Riverside, a suburb of Riverside, Tasmania
- Jurupa Valley, California, previously referred to as West Riverside

== See also ==
- West Riverside Mountains in Riverside County, California
