= Rice Valley Wilderness =

Protected wilderness area in California, United States

Coordinates: 33°56′54″N 114°44′41″W

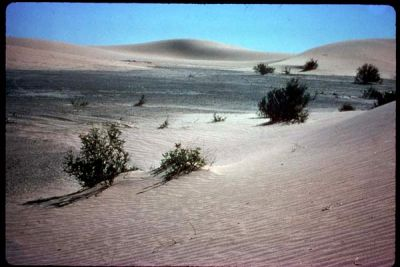
Sand dunes within the Rice Valley Wilderness

The Rice Valley Wilderness is a wilderness area near Blythe and Rice in the Mojave Desert region of California, managed by the Bureau of Land Management.

The 41,777-acre wilderness includes portions of the Big Maria Mountains, along with a stretch of sand dunes that is part of one of the state's largest dune systems. Congress designated the area as part of the 1994 California Desert Protection Act.
