= Rice Army Airfield =

Defunct airport, Riverside County, California

Rice Army Air Field
- Part of Fourth Air Force
- Riverside County, near Rice, California
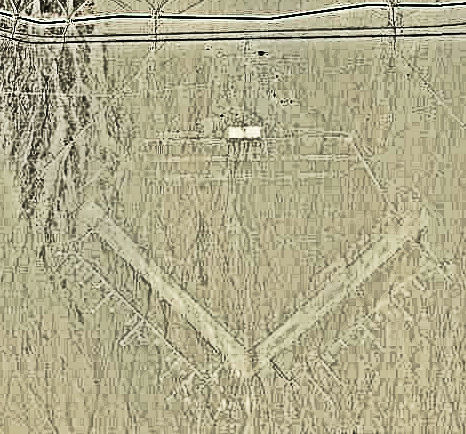
- 2006 USGS airphoto (detail enhanced image)

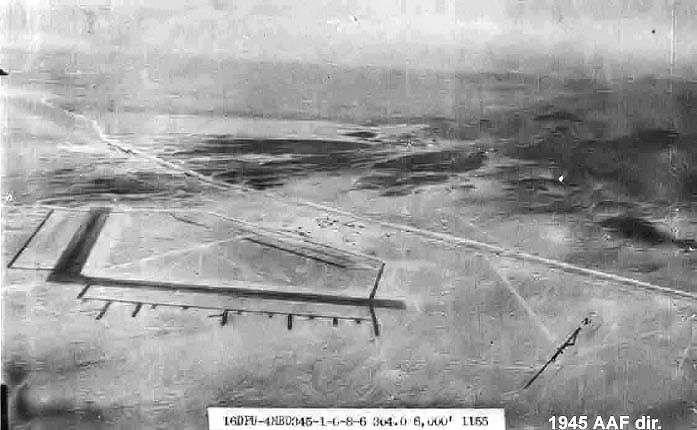
- 1945 USAAF oblique airphoto

Site information
- Type: Army Airfield
- Controlled by: United States Army Air Forces

Location
- Coordinates: 34°03′56″N 114°48′48″W

Site history
- Built: 1942
- In use: 1942–1944

Garrison information
- Garrison: Fourth Air Force

Rice Army Air Field (also known as Rice Air Base or Rice AAF) is an abandoned World War II airfield in Rice Valley of the southern Mojave Desert, located 1-mile (1.6 km) east-southeast of the community of Rice. The airfield is located in Riverside County just south of the San Bernardino county line and State Route 62.

== Wartime use ==
Rice AAF was acquired 29 September 1942 and was part of the World War II Desert Training Center in the Mojave Desert of Southern California. It apparently was a civil airfield before the war, known as "Rice Municipal Airport", its origins are unknown.

The mission of the training center was to prepare United States Army ground forces in preparation for Operation Torch – the invasion of North Africa. The center was commanded by then Brigadier General George Patton. The facility was assigned to United States Army Air Forces Fourth Air Force. The airfield consisted of two 5,000-foot runways with numerous dispersal pads extending off the runways to the south, and support facilities and barracks to house about 3,000 personnel.

Under the IV Air Support Command in 1942 and early 1943; the 71st Reconnaissance Group and the 85th Bombardment Group flew reconnaissance and dive bomber training missions with the Army ground forces in the DTC.

After most Army units had deployed to overseas theaters by mid-1943, Rice AAF became a Fourth Air Force group training facility for units deploying to combat commands overseas, training pilots and aircrew with a wide variety of tactical aircraft, from light observation planes to medium bombers. Known units assigned to Rice were:

- 312th Bombardment Group, 13 April – 15 August 1943
- 339th Fighter Group, September 1943 – March 1944

By May 1944, the airfield was assigned to the 15th Bombardment Wing at March Field as a sub-base. Military operations at Rice Army Air Field ended in August 1944, and the field was declared surplus in October. The facility was inactivated and turned over to the Army Corps of Engineers on 1 January 1946.

== Civil use ==
The War Assets Administration turned the military airfield to civil control, and was reused starting at some point in 1949 as a civilian airport.

Rice was depicted as an active public-use airfield on the March 1952 San Diego Sectional Chart. The chart depicted Rice as having a 5,000' paved runway. The status of the Rice airfield evidently changed to a private airfield at some point between 1952 and 1955, as that is how it was depicted on the September 1955 San Diego Sectional Chart. The Rice Airport was evidently abandoned (for reasons unknown) at some point between 1955 and 1958.

The property is currently free of permanent existing structures, offering a blank canvas for development. Existing runway areas are in place and provide an opportunity for rehabilitation or redesign to support future aviation or alternative uses. Two runways, one oriented NW/SE; the other NE/SW are faintly visible in aerial photography along with numerous fighter dispersal pads. A concrete parking area still exists about 0.5 miles (0.80 km) south of California Highway 62, which runs east/west north of the airfield. Dirt bike and dune buggy trails in the area obscure any evidence of roads or building foundations in what probably was the ground station. Generally, the entire area has reverted to its natural state.

As of January 2013 it was proposed that the Rice AAF site be used for the Rice Solar Energy Project.

== See also ==
- California World War II Army Airfields
- Desert Training Center
- Rice, California
