= Mesquite Mountains (Arizona) =

Landform in La Paz County, Arizona

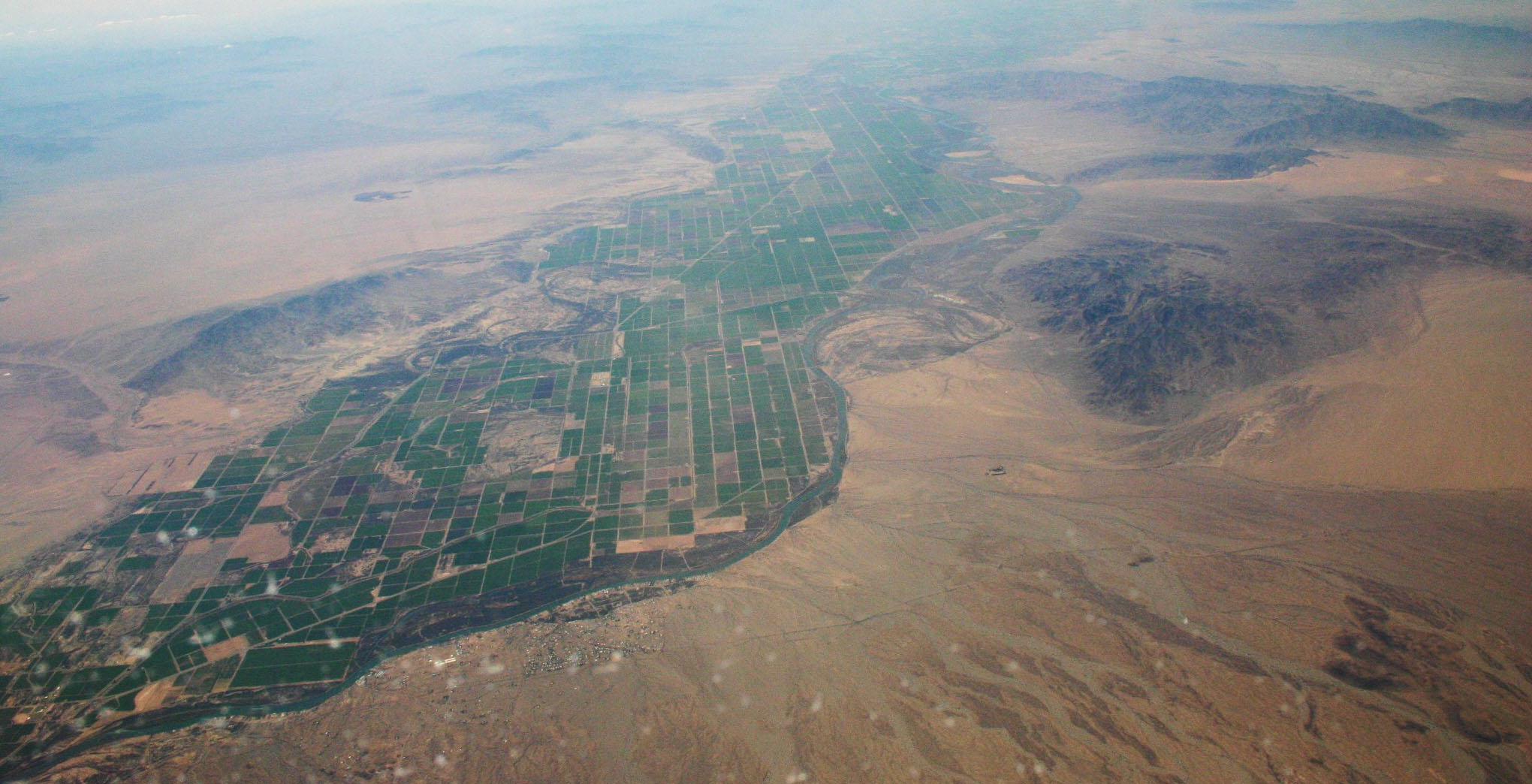
- (view to south); Aerial view of Riverside Mountains at center right-(the West Riversides are just to right (out of view) but attached to the south of the Riversides). The Big Maria Mountains are above at right (on horizon) to the south. The small mountain range across the Colorado River in Arizona (to the east) is the Mesquite Mountains (Arizona).

Highest point
- Elevation: 1,644 ft (501 m)
- Prominence: Mesquite Mountain

Dimensions
- Length: 13 mi (21 km) NE by SW

Geography
- Location within Arizona
- Country: United States
- State: Arizona
- Regions: (northwest)-Sonoran Desert; Parker Valley & Lower Colorado River Valley
- County: La Paz County
- CDP: Poston, Arizona
- Range coordinates: 33°59′31″N 114°17′02″W

The Mesquite Mountains (Arizona) are a mountain range in the U.S. state of Arizona. They are located along the east side of Parker Valley in the Lower Colorado River Valley is a small, lower elevation 13-mi (21 km) long mildly arced-shaped mountain range.

The range is an extension of the range abutting it south-southwestwards, the Dome Rock Mountains. Bouse Wash drains the plains to the east of the two ranges (the La Posa Plain), and the Bouse Wash turns into the Colorado River Valley (Parker Valley), by rounding the north terminus of the Mesquite Mountains.

The highpoint of the range is Mesquite Mountain, at the center-south of the range.
