= Midland, California =

Midland
- Ghost town
- Location within the state of California
- Coordinates: 33°51′40″N 114°48′08″W
- Country: United States
- State: California
- County: Riverside
- Time zone: UTC-8 (Pacific (PST))
  - Summer (DST): UTC-7 (PDT)

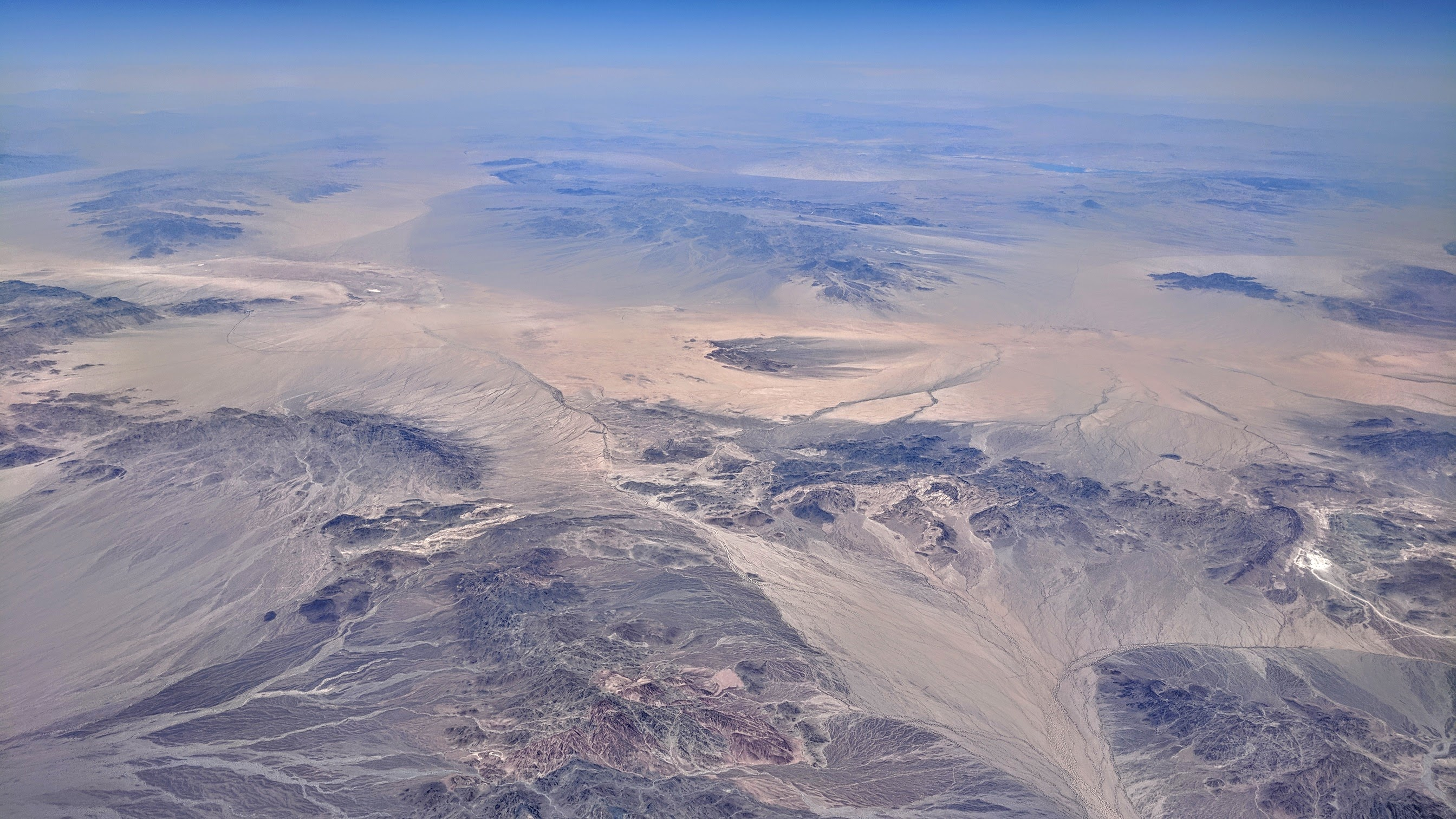
Aerial view of the desert area east of Joshua Tree National Park, including (at the far right) the abandoned gypsum mine Standard Mine and its associated company/ghost town of Midland, California

Midland is a ghost town in Riverside County in the southeastern part of the U.S. state of California. It is adjacent to the Little Maria Mountains and located about 20 mi (32 km) northwest of Blythe. It is accessible from Blythe in the south via Lovekin Boulevard and Midland Road, and from Rice in the north via Rice-Midland Road.

From 1925 to the 1960s, Midland was a company town owned by the U.S. Gypsum Co. The company had mined vast amounts of gypsum found in the area. Midland was also the site of a large plant that produced wallboard and plasterboard. For some time, there was a three-part railroad between the quarry and the crusher, the last part being a 3 ft (914 mm) narrow gauge line running few miles. The town's water was shipped from Blythe by rail. At its peak, the town had a population of approximately 1,000.

As the character of the gypsum found in the area was considered too heavy as the years went on, company activity in Midland subsided and then ended in 1966.

Many winter scenes in Hollywood films during the 20th century utilized faux snow that originated from Midland.

In the 1960s (before the town's demise), a gypsum mine 3 mi (4.8 km) west of the plant and abandoned in 1948 was converted into the largest fallout shelter in the county.

Most of the buildings of Midland were torn down, and today only foundations remain. In 1970, a 150,000-gallon water tank from Midland was moved on skids by tractor to the new Mesa Ranch Mobile Home Park and a housing site in northwest Blythe.
