= San Jacinto Tunnel =

Water tunnel in California, United States

Coordinates: 33.8761°N 116.8762°W

The San Jacinto tunnel is considered the key link in Colorado River Aqueduct system. The 13 mi (21 km) long, 16 ft (4.9 m) diameter tunnel runs beneath the San Jacinto Mountains between Cabazon, California and Gilman Hot Springs in Riverside County, California, United States.

== History ==
The $23 million project started on April 8, 1933. Tunnel crews dug from four directions: the two main portals and two ventilation shafts.

On July 1, 1934, one of the tunnel crews narrowly escaped the tunnel as ground water burst in and began filling the tunnel and shafts at a rate of nearly 8,000 US gallons per minute (0.50 m3/s). Metropolitan Water District of Southern California (MWD) Chief Engineer Frank E. Weymouth had noted in his 1930 report on the tunnel routes that the Parker route “involves less risk than any of the other proposed lines.” The continued intrusion of water was more than the original contractors could handle, and in February 1935 the MWD terminated the contract and took over the job. More pumps were brought in and a portion of the tunnel was re-routed. Three crews of 34 men, working eight-hour shifts worked on the tunnel.

The MWD continued to encounter tunnel seepage. The amount varied but never dropped below 540 US gallons per minute (0.034 m3/s), and sometimes topped 30,000 US gallons per minute (1.9 m3/s). By 1935 the seepage had become a concern around the San Jacinto Valley as springs, creeks and streams began to run dry. On October 21, 1935 the Riverside County Board of Supervisors passed a resolution calling on the MWD to prevent water from entering the tunnel or from flowing away from the place it was encountered. The MWD responded by stating that water entering the tunnel during digging is nearly unavoidable, and that lining of the tunnels near the end of construction should prevent further inflow. Lawsuits were filed against MWD by nearby landowners and most of these were settled out of court, with MWD paying out over $350,000 between 1936 and 1944.

The largest settlement was known as the Poorman contract. The Poorman family owned a 1,700 acres (6.9 km2) dairy ranch on the south side of the San Jacinto River, across from Gilman Hot Springs, along with 3,600 acres (15 km2) of grass and grazing in the upper Perris valley. The ranches were managed by Ed Poorman, known locally as the founding president of the Ramona Pageant Association. Ed Poorman's brother, Samuel Poorman, was an attorney for the Los Angeles Department of Water and Power. In 1937, after noticing a drop in groundwater, Samuel Poorman negotiated a settlement with the MWD for the loss of groundwater, but instead of taking cash, the Poormans took their share in water.

The settlement was negotiated in secret and included two additional landowners. The Pico family of California, owners of a 3,200 acre (13 km2) ranch southwest of the Poorman's ranch, also agreed to take water in return for dropping their claim against the MWD. Dairy farmer Clayton Record Sr. agreed to take five percent of the seepage water in exchange for right of way across his property. The contract was signed on February 11, 1937, turning over the entire seepage flow to the three ranchers, with 57 percent going to the Poormans. The pipeline that would carry water from the west portal to Lake Mathews crossed the Poorman ranch, and a safety blowout (where excess pressure could be released in an emergency) was built on the property where their share was delivered.

Other local ranchers and water companies were caught off guard by the settlement. The Nuevo Water Company had been negotiating with the MWD since 1936 to have the seepage water pumped higher up the San Jacinto River where it could be allowed to sink back into the natural water table. Nuevo thought it was close to a settlement when suddenly the MWD signed the Poorman contract and cut off all negotiations.

=== Completion ===
In November 1938, the two segments of the tunnel met under the mountain, no more than a few inches off. With the excavation completed, the tunnel was then grouted with concrete. This operation filled in cracks and crevices and reduced the tunnel to its finished size of 16 feet (4.9 m) in diameter. About 24,100 tons of cement were used in the attempts to seal off the seepage, averaging about 20 sacks per foot of tunnel. As leaks were sealed, pressure would build and create a new leak elsewhere. Eventually the seepage was reduced to 540 US gallons per minute (0.034 m3/s), and on October 14, 1939, the San Jacinto Tunnel was completed, well ahead of schedule.

As pressure increased over time, the tunnel grouting failed and seepage more than quadrupled. In February 1942, the Riverside County Board of Supervisors renewed its protest against exporting local water. The MWD responded by stating that local claims had been settled and that a substantial amount of the water was being used for local agriculture.

On June 21, 1944, the Water and Natural Resources Committee of the Hemet Valley Chamber of Commerce called a meeting of concerned ranchers from Hemet, San Jacinto, Perris, Lakeview and Nuevo. They organized themselves as the San Jacinto River Protective Committee, with Irwin Farrar elected as chairman. The committee focused on development of the local area, and claimed that water that was being carried out of the area by the MWD could irrigate up to 4,000 acres (16 km2) each year. The committee made two demands of the MWD: stop seepage in the San Jacinto tunnel, and return the estimated 150,000 acre feet (190,000,000 m3) of water than had been carried away since 1934. Over $9000 was raised in donations to aid the battle with the MWD. On December 15, 1944, the committee met with the MWD Water Problems Committee and requested that water be pumped from the west portal further up the San Jacinto River and be released above the Soboba Indian Reservation where the water could spread, and return to the local water table. The MWD agreed to study the matter.

The San Jacinto River Protective Committee arranged filings of four lawsuits against the MWD by various water users along the San Jacinto River. The four plaintiffs were the Nuevo Water Company, the Hemet Packing Company (owners of a 1,000 acres (4.0 km2) ranch in Lakeview), the Centinela Ranch near San Jacinto, and Leland Houk, who had a ranch southwest of Hemet. The MWD responded, maintaining that it had acted in good faith and claimed that 16,400 acre feet (20,200,000 m3) of water has been returned at the Cosa Loma outlet and Lakeview siphon, as agreed in the Poorman contract.

After further negotiations and meetings, the MWD agreed to attempt to reseal the tunnel. In December 1946, the tunnel was shut down and work was begun to remediate the leakage. The tunnel was lined with concrete varying from 19 inches to 6 feet (1.8 m) in thickness. The seepage was temporarily reduced, but pressure again built up and the seepage increased. By the end of 1947, the MWD and the San Jacinto River Conservation District (formerly the San Jacinto River Protective Committee) agreed that it was impossible to completely stop the seepage. By the fall of 1952, all the Poorman rights were acquired by the newly formed Eastern Municipal Water District of Southern California. Benefit of the seepage water was conveyed to EMWD customers in the form of district-wide credits against water rates.
