= McCoy Mountains =

Mountains in southeastern California, US

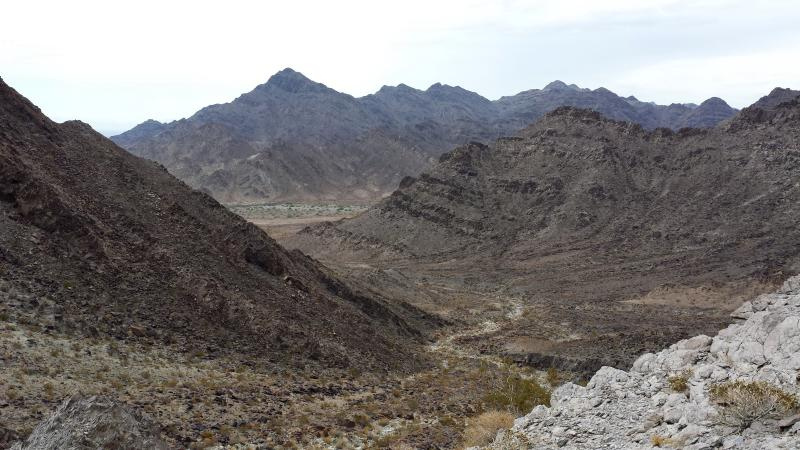
- North-central McCoy Mountains

Highest point
- Elevation: 834 m (2,736 ft)

Geography
- Location within California
- Country: United States
- State: California
- District: Riverside County
- Range coordinates: 33°41′20.079″N 114°50′39.874″W
- Topo map: USGS McCoy Peak

The McCoy Mountains are located in southeastern California in the United States. The southeast terminus of the range lies adjacent the western edge of the Parker Valley in a southern stretch of the Lower Colorado River Valley corridor.

== Geography ==
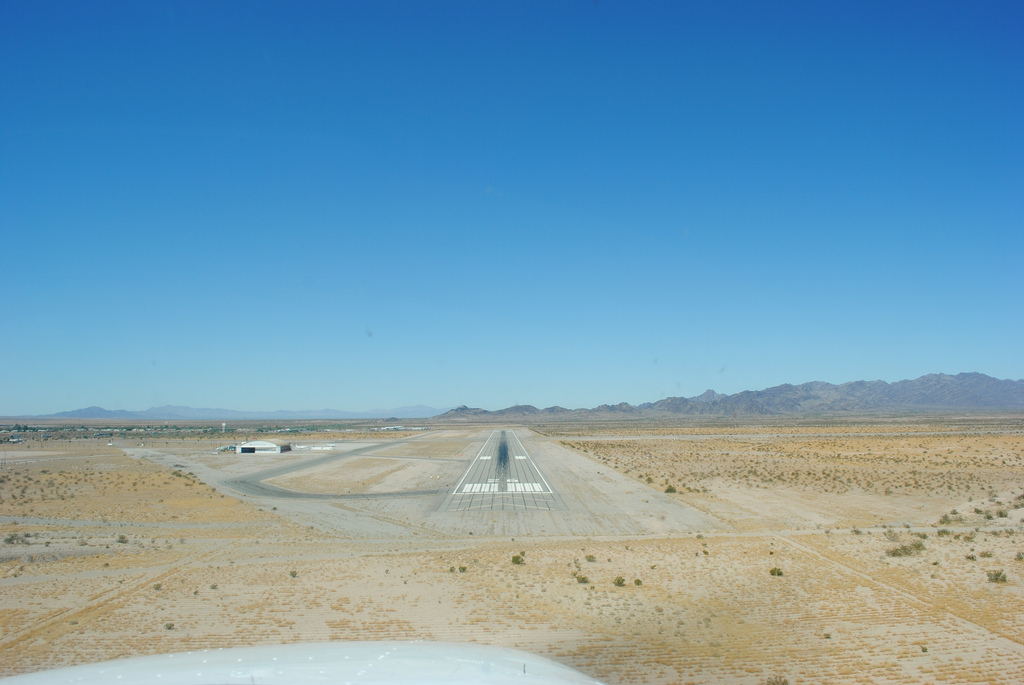
Southern terminus of McCoy Mountains viewed on due-east approach to Blythe Airport. (approx. 4 mi west)

The range lies in a northwest-southeasterly direction east of the Palen Mountains and south of the Little Maria Mountains. The mountain range is approximately 18 miles long and is located just north of Interstate 10, and about seven miles northeast of Chuckawalla Valley State Prison.

The mountains reach an elevation of 2,054 feet above sea level at McCoy Peak, at the southern end of the range. Downtown Blythe, California is about 10 miles to the east.

== Palen/McCoy Wilderness Area ==
The McCoy Mountains are in the Palen/McCoy Wilderness Area, managed by the Bureau of Land Management.

Within the Palen-McCoy Wilderness are the Granite, McCoy, Palen, Little Maria, and Arica Mountains, which are five distinct mountain ranges separated by broad sloping Alluvial fans-baJadas. Because this large area incorporates so many major geological features, the diversity of vegetation and landforms is exceptional. The desert wash woodland found here provides food and cover for burro deer, coyote, bobcat, gray fox, and mountain lion. Desert pavement, bajadas, interior valleys, canyons, dense ironwood forests, canyons and rugged peaks form a constantly changing landscape pattern.

== See also ==
- Category:Flora of the California desert regions
- Category:Protected areas of the Colorado Desert
- Category:Wilderness areas within the Lower Colorado River Valley
- Category:Bureau of Land Management areas in California
