= Palen Mountains =

Landform in Riverside County, California

- Location within California

Highest point
- Elevation: 596 m (1,955 ft)

Geography
- Country: United States
- State: California
- District: Riverside County
- Range coordinates: 33°47′48″N 115°03′39″W
- Topo map: USGS Palen Mountains

The Palen Mountains are located in the southern Mojave Desert – northern Colorado Desert in eastern Riverside County, California, US. The range lies southeast of the Coxcomb Mountains, and northeast of the Chuckwalla Mountains near Interstate 10. The mountains lie in a southwest-northeasterly direction and are approximately 15 miles long and nine miles wide at their widest point.

== Desert Lily Preserve ==
Palen Pass, at 1,472 feet above sea level, lies at the northern end of the chain, with Palen Dry Lake and the Bureau of Land Management designated and managed Edmund C. Jaeger Nature Sanctuary to the west of the range in the southern Palen Valley. It preserves the beautiful Desert Lily (Hesperocallis undulata), many other native desert plants, and an important undeveloped "land bridge" wildlife corridor.

== Palen/McCoy Wilderness Area ==
The Palen Mountains are in the Palen/McCoy Wilderness Area, managed by the Bureau of Land Management.

Within the Palen-McCoy Wilderness are the Palen, Granite, Arica, Little Maria, and McCoy Mountains, which are five distinct mountain ranges separated by broad sloping alluvial fans-bajadas. Because this large area incorporates so many major geological features, the diversity of vegetation and landforms is exceptional. The desert-wash woodland found here provides food and cover for burro deer, coyote, bobcat, gray fox, and mountain lion. Desert pavement, bajadas, interior valleys, canyons, dense ironwood forests, canyons, and rugged peaks form a constantly changing landscape pattern.

== See also ==
- Category:Flora of the California desert regions
- Category:Protected areas of the Colorado Desert
- Category:Wilderness areas within the Lower Colorado River Valley
- Category:Bureau of Land Management areas in California
