= West Riverside Mountains =

Mountain range in California

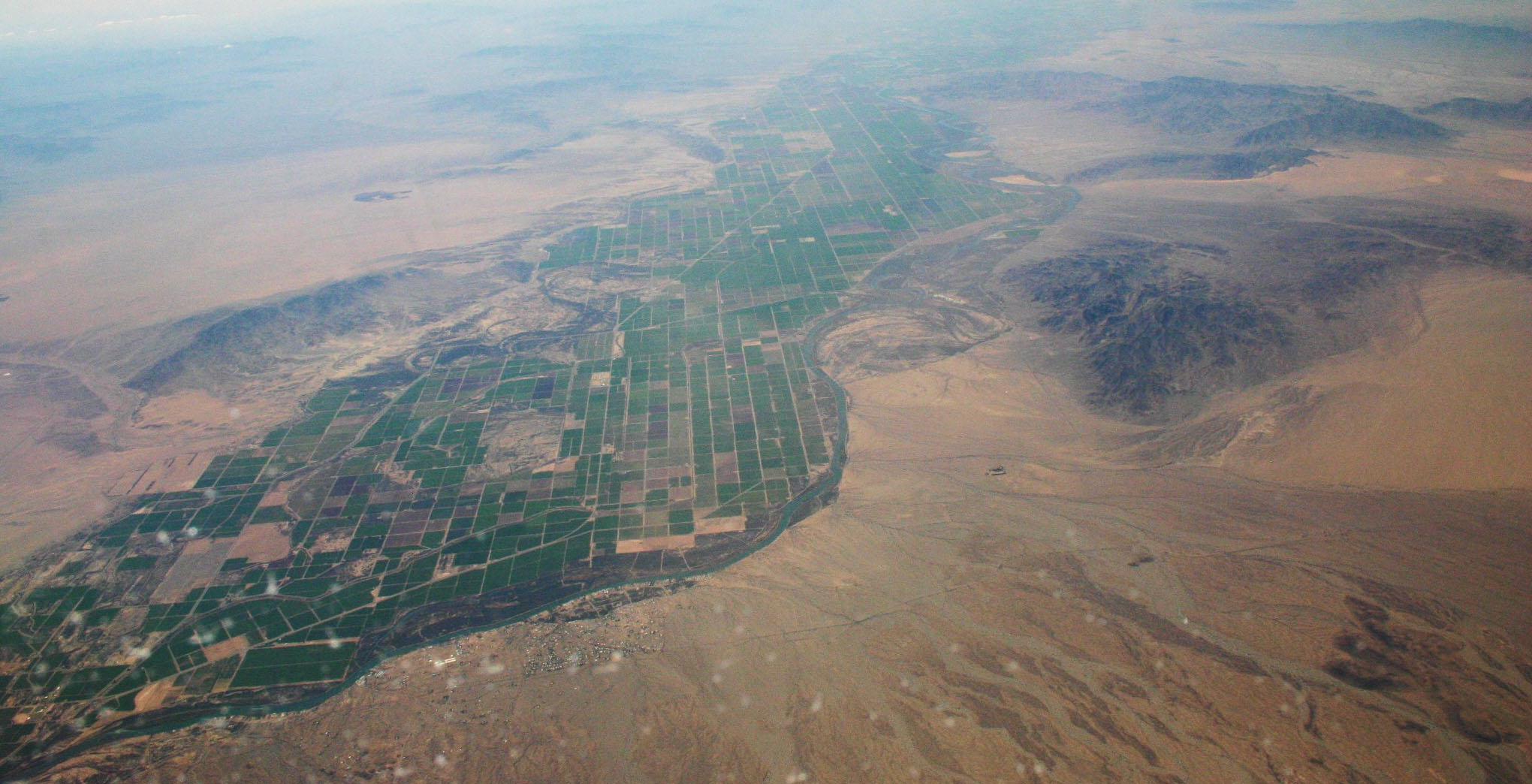
- (view to south); Aerial view of West Riverside Mountains & Riverside Mountains at center right. The Big Maria Mountains are above at right (on horizon) to the south. The small mountain range across the Colorado River in Arizona (to the east) is the Mesquite Mountains.

Highest point
- Elevation: 803 m (2,635 ft)
- Coordinates: 34°03′27″N 114°38′52″W

Dimensions
- Length: 4.5 mi (7.2 km) north-south
- Width: 3.8 mi (6.1 km) east-west

Geography
- Location within California
- Country: United States
- State: California
- District: Riverside County
- Range coordinates: 34°03′28″N 114°38′52″W
- Topo map(s): USGS Grommet, Vidal

The West Riverside Mountains are a mountain range in eastern Riverside County, California. They extend about 0.75 miles into San Bernardino County. The Riverside Mountains are 1 mile southeast; the Turtle Mountains are 9 miles to the northwest.

== See also ==
- Riverside Mountains
- Parker Valley
