= Iron Mountains (California) =

Mountain range in California, USA

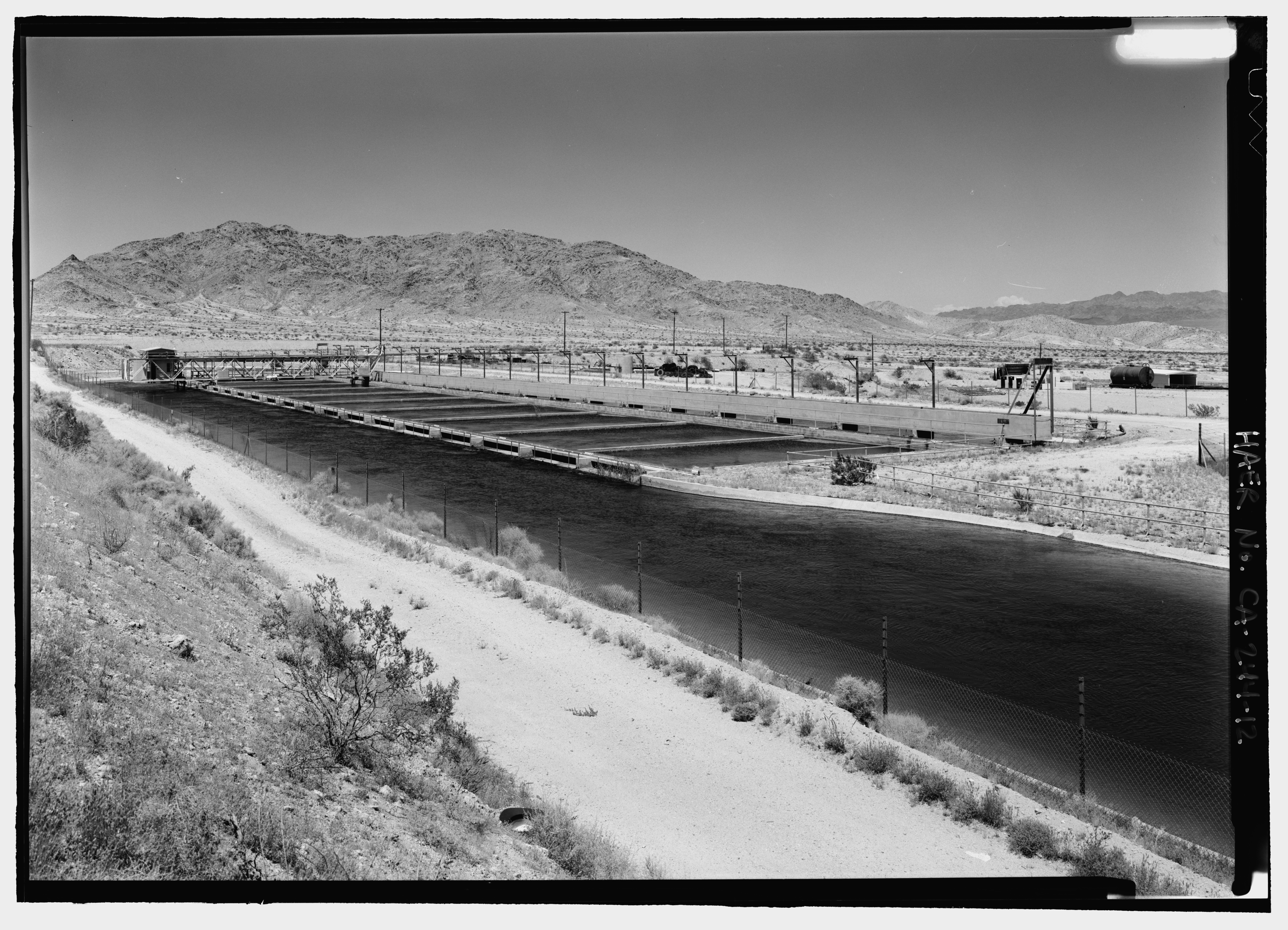
- Canal connecting to the Iron Mountain Pump Plant at the southeast foothills region of the Iron Mountains (California). (view due west)

Highest point
- Elevation: 2,182 feet (665 m)

Dimensions
- Length: 12.5 mi (20.1 km) NNW-SSE
- Width: 7.5 mi (12.1 km) E-W

Geography
- Location within California
- Country: United States
- State: California
- District: San Bernardino County
- Range coordinates: 34°10′16″N 115°12′34″W
- Topo map: USGS Iron Mountains

The Iron Mountains are a mountain range in eastern San Bernardino County, California. The southern end of the range extends into Riverside County north of Granite Pass.

The range is bordered on the east by Ward Valley with the Turtle Mountains beyond. To the north lie the Old Woman Mountains. To the west across Cadiz Valley lie the Calumet Mountains. To the southwest lie the Coxcomb Mountains within Joshua Tree National Monument and to the south across Granite Pass and California State Route 62 are the Granite Mountains.

The Iron Mountain Pump Plant sits adjacent to the east side of the range and the Colorado River Aqueduct traverses the range through the Iron Mountain Tunnel.

During World War II, from 1942 to 1944, near the Iron Mountains the US Army built Camp Iron Mountain to train troops and prepare them to do battle in North Africa to fight the Nazis. At Camp Iron Mountain were stationed the 2nd Armored Division under General George S. Patton. The Iron Mountain Pump Plant airstrip is the former Camp Iron Mountain Airfield.
