= Little Maria Mountains =

Mountain range in California, United States

- Location within California

Highest point
- Elevation: 483 m (1,585 ft)

Geography
- Country: United States
- State: California
- District: Riverside County
- Range coordinates: 33°52′54.063″N 114°53′21.888″W
- Topo map: USGS Little Maria Mountains

The Little Maria Mountains are located in southeastern California in the United States. The range lies in a northwest-southeasterly direction east of the Palen Mountains and west of the Big Maria Mountains. The mountain range is approximately 15 miles long and is located about 12.6 miles north of Interstate 10, and 12 miles southwest of the abandoned Rice Army Airfield near State Route 62. The Victor Mine is found at the southeastern end of the range near Midland.

== Geology ==
The Little Maria Mountains are one of several ranges that constitute the Maria Fold and Thrust Belt. The Maria Fold and Thrust Belt underwent generally thick-skinned (involving basement rocks) North-South trending crustal shortening in the Cretaceous. The structures of the MFTB are exposed by later generally East-West trending large-scale crustal extension in the Miocene, through what is known to geologists as the Colorado River Extensional Corridor. This North-South shortening is anomalous, as crustal shortening in the rest of the North American Cordillera is oriented generally East-West because of the generally East-West compression that was due to the subduction of the Farallon plate under western North America. Also unlike the rest of the North American Cordillera, deformation in the Maria Fold and Thrust Belt involved rocks of the North American Craton, most notably the Grand Canyon sequence of sedimentary rocks.

== Palen/McCoy Wilderness Area ==
The Little Maria Mountains are in the Palen/McCoy Wilderness Area, managed by the Bureau of Land Management.

Within the Palen-McCoy Wilderness are the Little Maria, Granite, Arica, Palen, and McCoy Mountains, which are five distinct mountain ranges separated by broad sloping Alluvial fans-bajadas. Because this large area incorporates so many major geological features, the diversity of vegetation and landforms is exceptional. The desert wash woodland found here provides food and cover for burro deer, coyote, bobcat, gray fox, and mountain lion. Desert pavement, bajadas, interior valleys, canyons, dense ironwood forests-(Olneya tesota), canyons, and rugged peaks, form a constantly changing landscape pattern.
