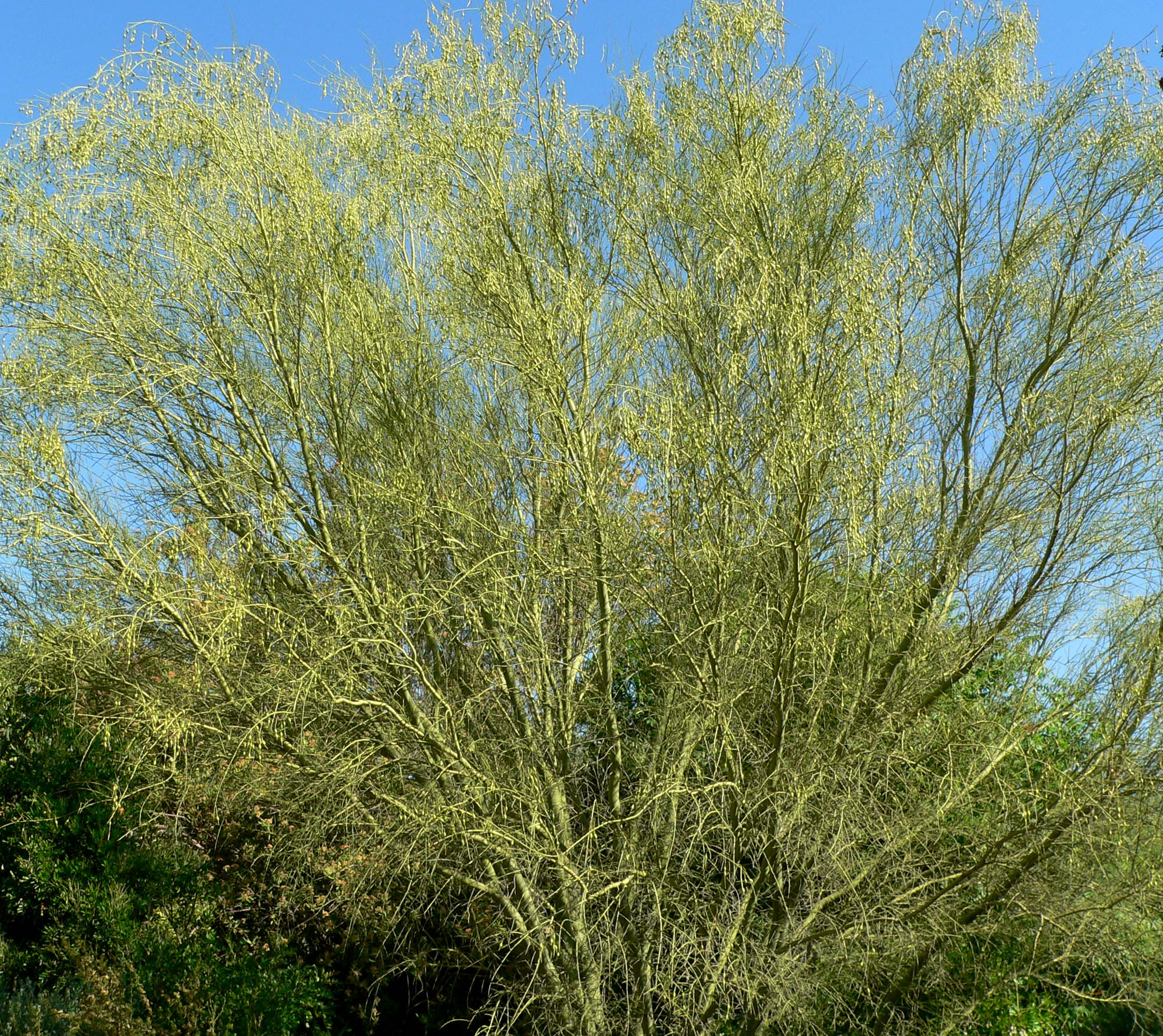

Scientific classification
- Kingdom: Plantae
- Clade: Embryophytes
- Clade: Tracheophytes
- Clade: Spermatophytes
- Clade: Angiosperms
- Clade: Eudicots
- Clade: Rosids
- Order: Fabales
- Family: Fabaceae
- Subfamily: Caesalpinioideae
- Genus: Parkinsonia
- Species: P. microphylla

Binomial name
- Parkinsonia microphylla Torr.
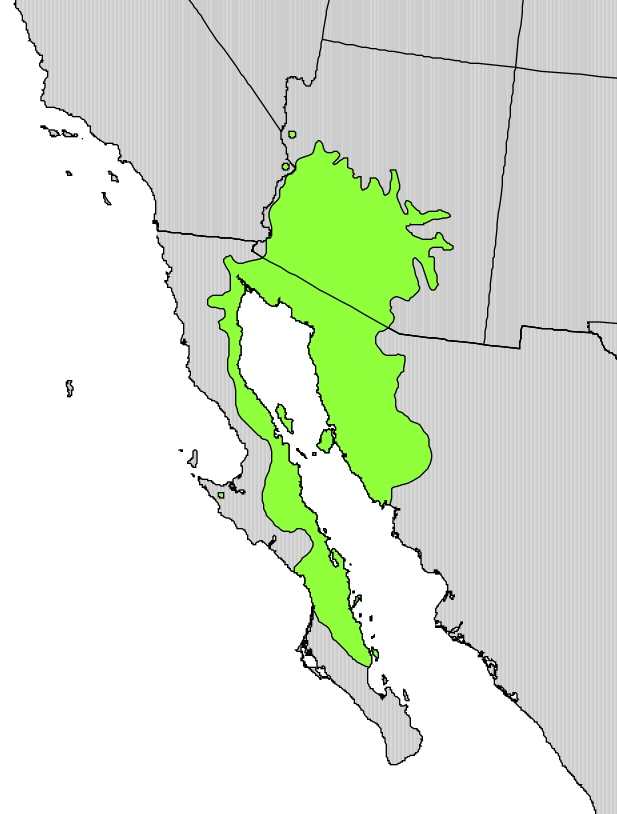
- Natural range

Synonyms
- Cercidium microphyllum (Torr.) Rose & I.M. Johnst.

= Parkinsonia microphylla =

Species of tree

Parkinsonia microphylla, the yellow paloverde, foothill paloverde or little-leaved palo verde; syn. Cercidium microphyllum), is a species of palo verde.

It is native to the Southwestern United States in southeastern California and southern Arizona; and to northwest Mexico in the states of Sinaloa, Sonora, and Baja California. The plant is mostly found on slopes, and is one of the most common trees of the Sonoran Desert.

== Description ==
Parkinsonia microphylla is a bristling, upright-branching tree. The species is slow-growing, sometimes living for several hundred years. It typically grows to heights of around 5 metres (16 ft), although rarely it can reach 6–7 metres (20–23 ft) tall.

The leaves are yellowish green, and during extensively dry and hot periods the tree will shed them. It has the characteristic of performing photosynthesis in its bark (hence the green color), and this is what allows it to survive leafless in hotter periods.

The flowers are found on the end of a branch, small, pale yellow and occur in late spring. The tree may not flower every year, depending on rainfall. If there is enough rainfall, seeds will also appear in 4–8 cm long, soft pods which dip in between each seed. They ripen in July, and stick to the branches.

The seedlings are very sensitive to drought for the first two to three months of their lives; only about 1.6% will survive after germinating.

Threats

Buffelgrass is an exotic species of grass native to Africa, introduced into the Sonoran Desert for livestock grazing. It spreads very quickly and can kill the paloverde seedlings by using available water, which could be a threat in the future.

== Ecology ==
It is a honey plant, and its twigs are browsed by wildlife, such as the jackrabbit. In times of scarcity, it may be gnawed by livestock. Rodents will often carry and store the seeds underground, where some of them will germinate after a rainy season.

== Uses ==
The Seri people, a Native American group of northwestern Mexico, call this tree ziipxöl [ʃiːpχʷɬ]. They grind up the seeds for flour, boil the green pods with meat, and eat the sweet green seeds as well as the flowers. The seeds are also strung to make jewelry.

=== Cultivation ===
Parkinsonia microphylla is cultivated as an ornamental tree for use in xeriscapic, modernist, and native plant gardens. It is also used as a small tree in parking lot plantings of commercial developments.

== Gallery ==
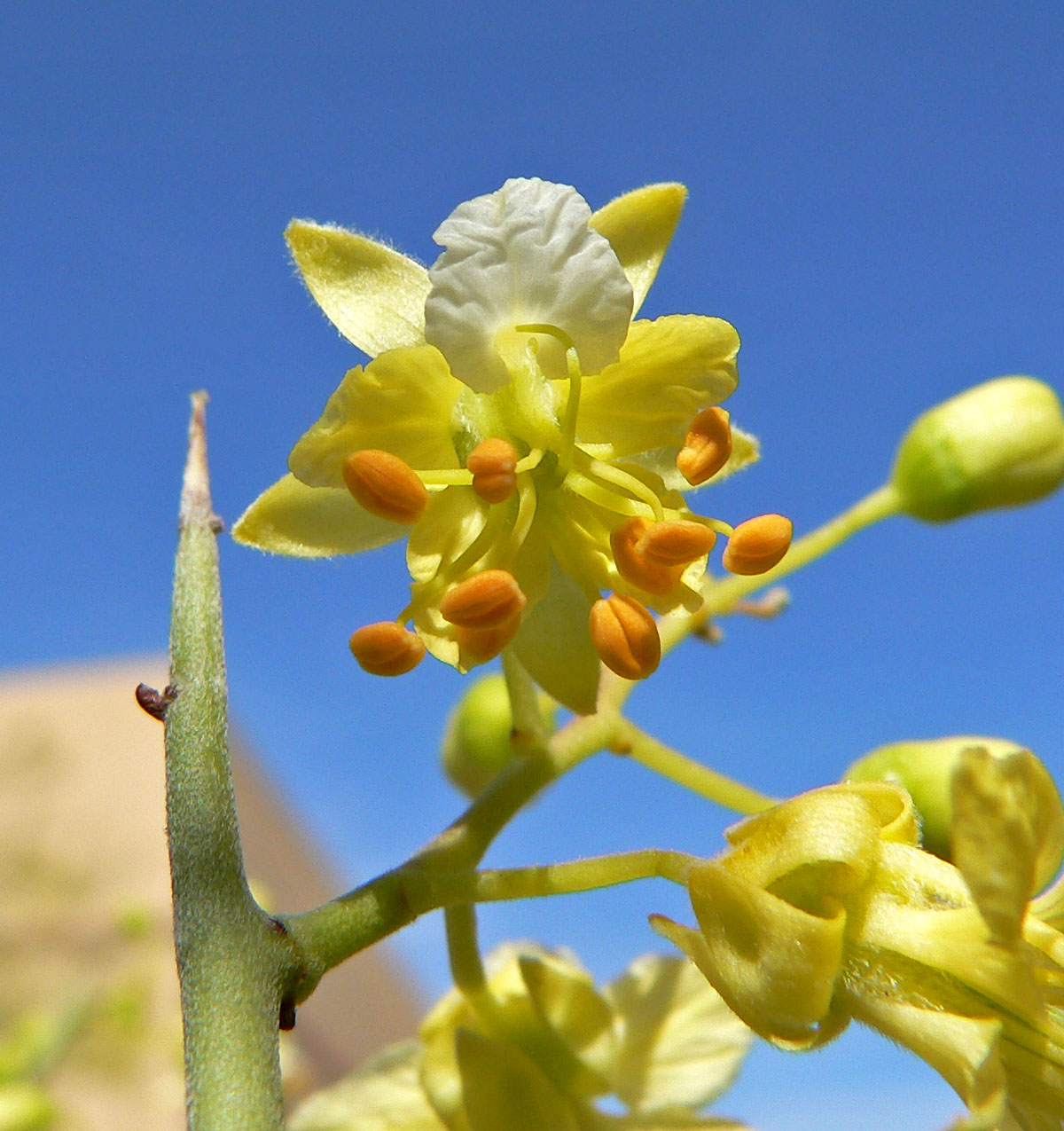
Flowers

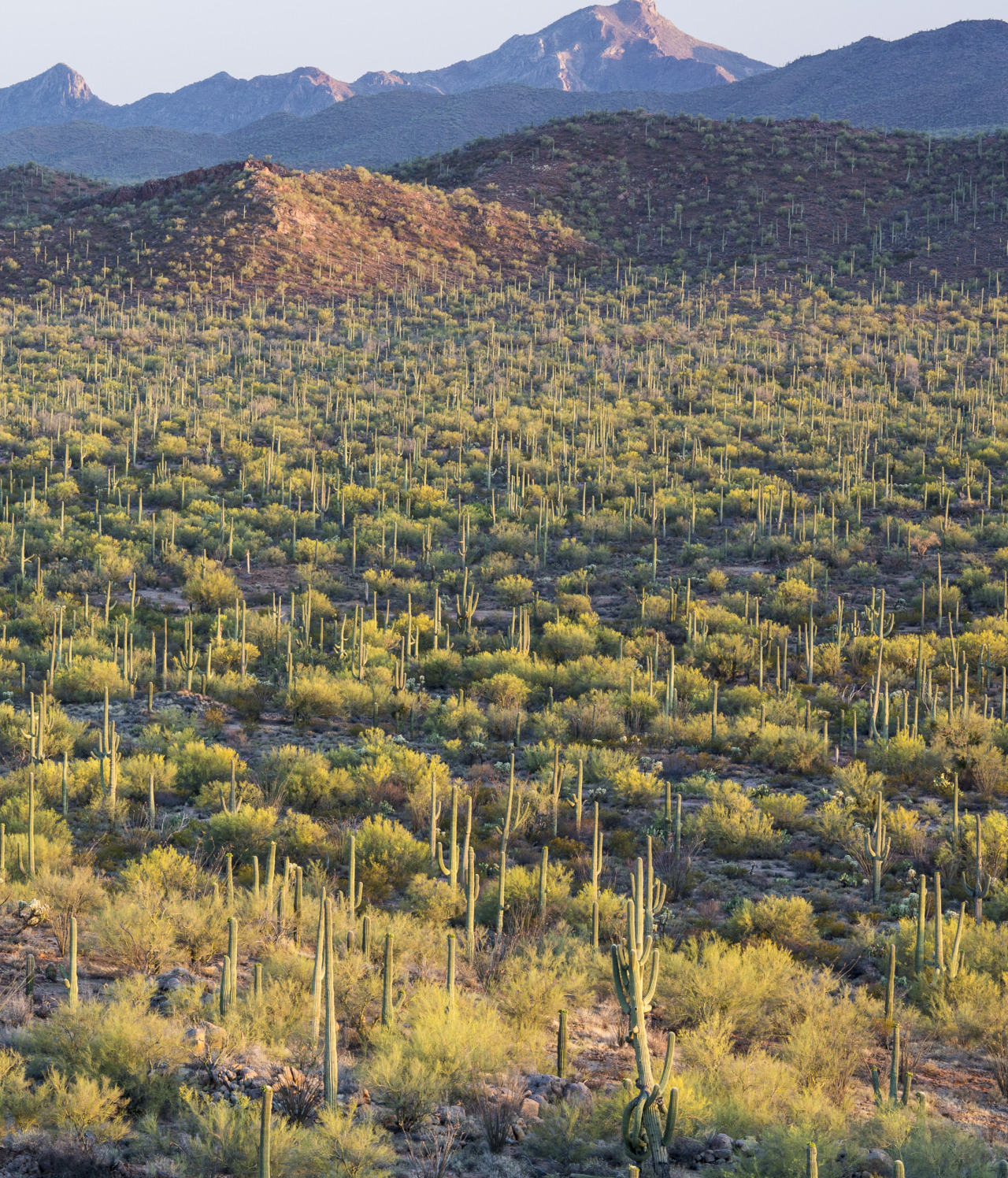
Saguaro and Palo Verde forest, Ironwood Forest National Monument

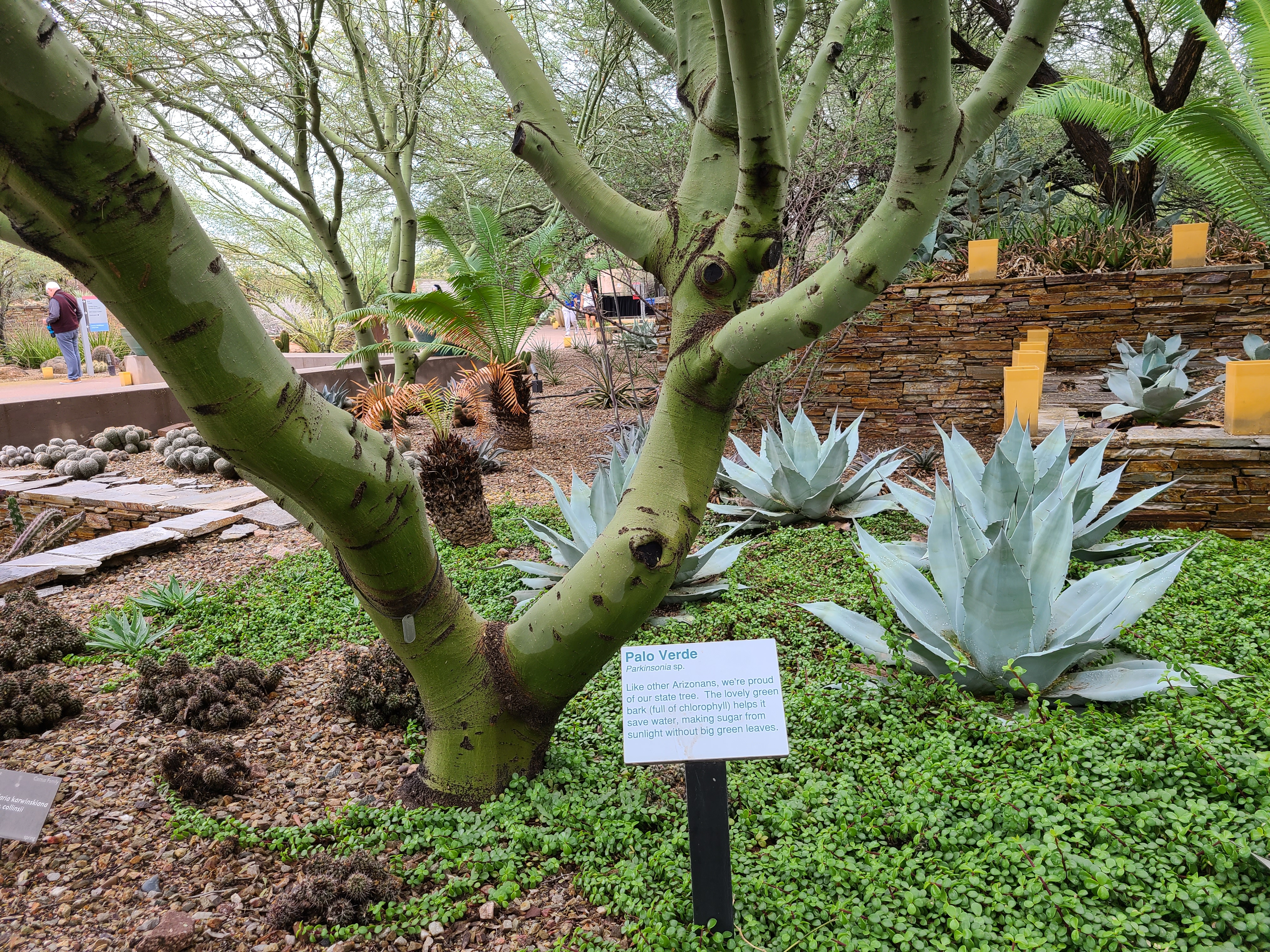
Trunk of the Parkinsonia microphylla at the Desert Botanical Garden
