= Turtle Mountains (California) =

Mountain range in California, United States

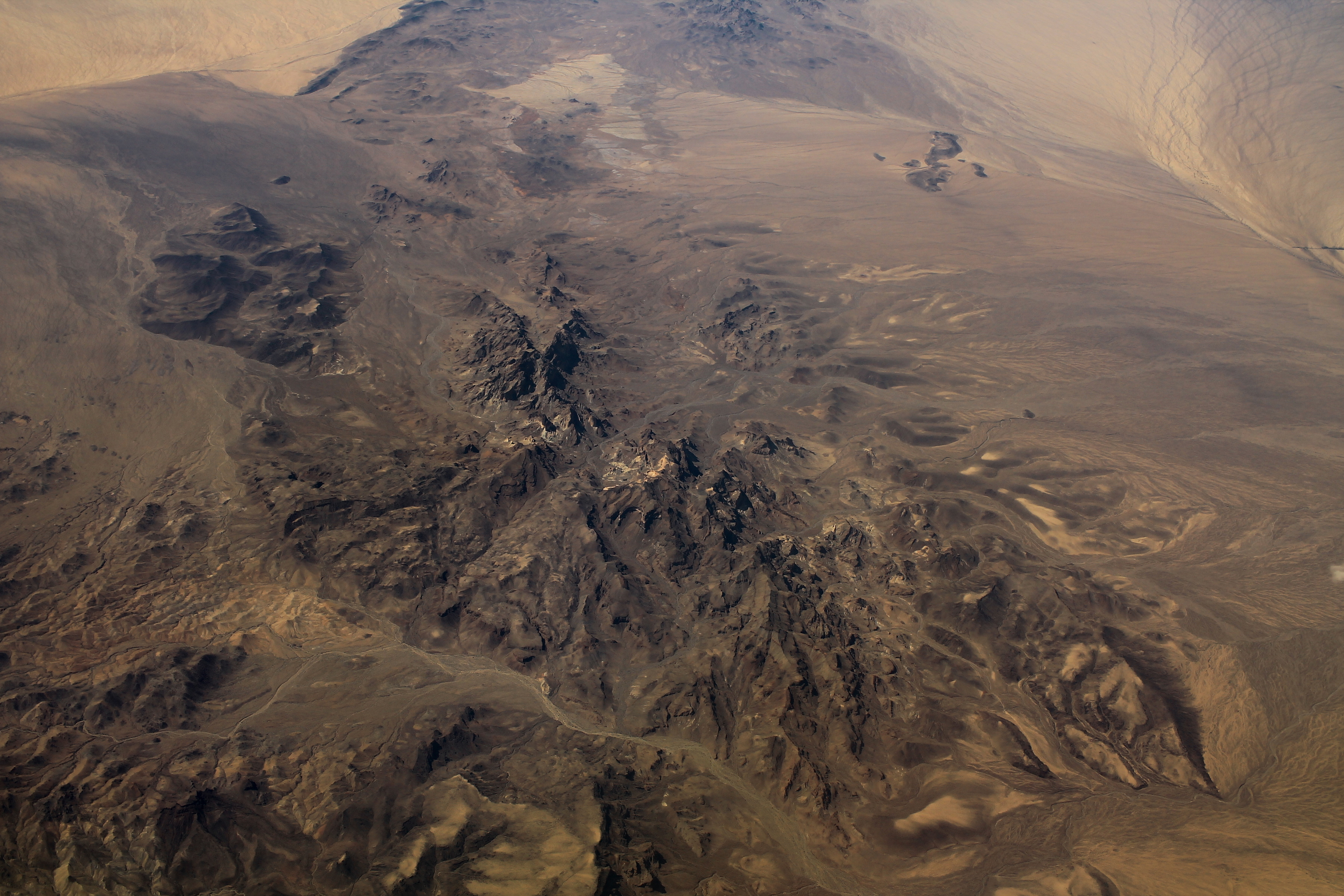
- Aerial view of the Turtle Mountains

Highest point
- Elevation: 960 ft (290 m)
- Coordinates: 34°17′10″N 114°51′3″W

Geography
- Location within California
- Country: United States
- State: California
- District: San Bernardino County
- Topo map: USGS Mopah Peaks

U.S. National Natural Landmark
- Type: NNL
- Date: 1973

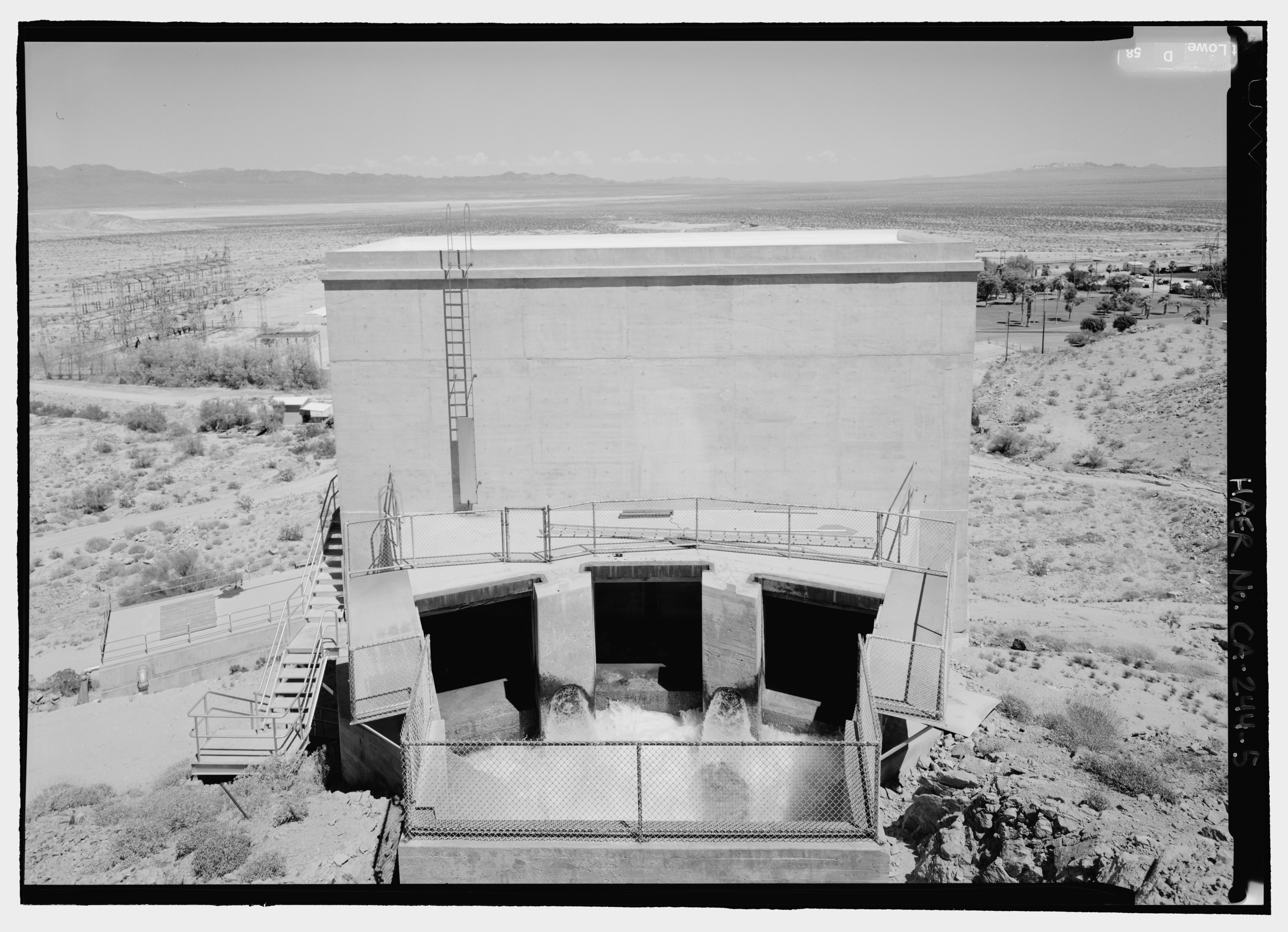
(view due east) Turtle Mountains at left across Ward Valley & Danby Lake. (view from southeast Iron Mountains)

The Turtle Mountains (Amat 'Achii'ar in the Mojave language), are located in northeastern San Bernardino County, in the southeastern part of California. The colorful Turtle Mountains vary from deep reds, browns, tans and grays, to black. The area has numerous springs and seeps. The Turtle Mountains are also a National Natural Landmark, with two mountain sections of entirely different composition.

== Geography ==
The Turtle Mountains are 30 miles (48 km) southwest of Needles, California, west off of U.S. Highway 95; with Vidal Junction close on the southeast, Twentynine Palms to the west, and Blythe is south. The Turtle Mountains are considered part of the greater Lower Colorado River Valley region.

The range is directly west of and connected with the Mopah Range. They lie in a north–south direction east of Ward Valley and the Old Woman Mountains. They are west of the Whipple Mountains and Colorado River. The Turtle Mountains reach an elevation of 1310+ meters (4297.9+ feet). They are a registered National Natural Landmark in recognition of their exceptional natural values.

== Geology ==
The Turtle Mountains are one of several ranges that constitute the Maria Fold and Thrust Belt. The Maria Fold and Thrust Belt underwent generally thick-skinned (involving basement rocks) North-South trending crustal shortening in the Cretaceous, followed by generally east–west trending large-scale crustal extension in the Miocene. This North-South shortening is anomalous, as crustal shortening in the rest of the North American Cordillera is oriented generally east–west because of the generally east–west compression that was due to the subduction of the Farallon plate under western North America. Also unlike the rest of the North American Cordillera, deformation in the Maria Fold and Thrust Belt involved rocks of the North American Craton, most notably the Grand Canyon sequence of sedimentary rocks.

== Wilderness ==
Established in 1994 by the U.S. Congress, the Turtle Mountains Wilderness ranges from broad bajadas to highly eroded volcanic peaks, spires, and cliffs. The 177,309 acre wilderness area is managed by the U.S. Bureau of Land Management and is bordered by the Stepladder Mountains Wilderness to the north.

=== Natural history ===
The Turtle Mountains are located in an ecological transition zone between the Mojave Desert (High Desert) and Colorado Desert region of the Sonoran Desert (Low Desert) and therefore contains a high diversity of plant and animal species. The Turtle Mountain range is a northern or southern 'delimiter of occurrence' for some species; for example the endangered California fan palm (Washingtonia filifera) encounters the northern limit of its range in the Mopah-Turtle Mountains.

Dominant vegetation in the Turtle Mountains Wilderness Area consists of the creosote bush-bur sage with creosote bush (Larrea tridentata) and the palo verde-cactus shrub ecosystems with the palo verde tree (Parkinsonia microphylla). In the washes, Colorado/Sonoran microphylla woodlands can be found. These woodlands include such things as smoke tree (Psorothamnus spinosus), honey mesquite (Prosopis velutina), and catclaw (Acacia greggii).

Wildlife species include desert bighorn sheep, coyote, black-tailed jackrabbits, ground squirrels, kangaroo rats, quail, roadrunners, golden eagles, prairie falcons, rattlesnakes, the desert tortoise and several species of lizards.

=== Recreation ===
Hiking, horseback riding, camping, rock hounding, photography, and backpacking can be enjoyed in this wilderness. The area is popular with rock hounding hobbyists and is nationally known for chalcedony specimens in a form known as "Mopah roses". The natural palm oases of Coffin, Mopah, and Mohawk Springs, are popular hiking destinations.
