= Danby Lake =

Lake in the state of California, United States

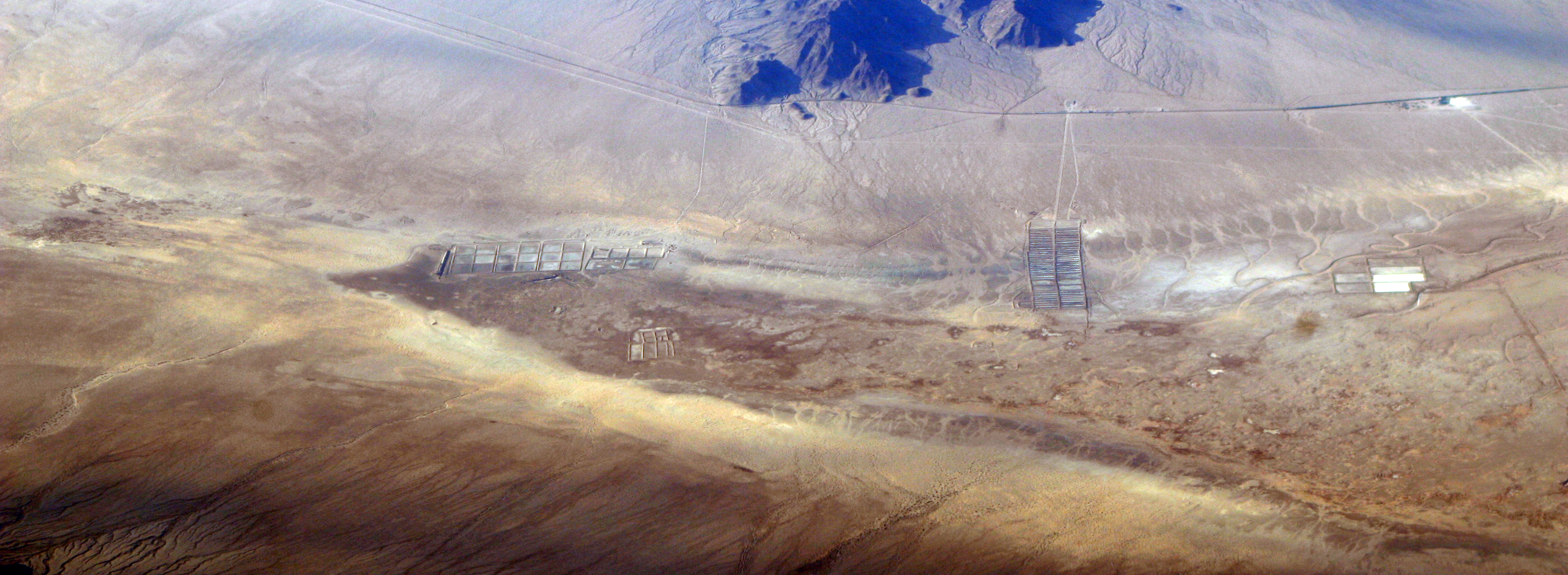
- Western extent of Danby Lake from the south

- Location within California Location within the United States
- Location: Mojave Desert; San Bernardino County, California
- Coordinates: 34.2397°N 115.1480°W
- Lake type: Endorheic basin
- Primary outflows: Terminal (evaporation)
- Basin countries: United States
- Max. length: 15 km (9.3 mi)
- Max. width: 4 km (2.5 mi)
- Shore length^{1}: 50 km (31 mi)
- Surface elevation: 192 m (630 ft)
- ^{1} Shore length is not a well-defined measure.

Danby Lake (also known as Danby Dry Lake) is a dry lake bed in the Mojave Desert of San Bernardino County, California, 50 mi (80 km) northwest of Blythe. The lake is approximately 9 mi (14 km) long and 2.5 mi (4.0 km) at its widest point.

== See also ==
- List of lakes in California
