= Colorado River Aqueduct =

Water conveyance in Southern California

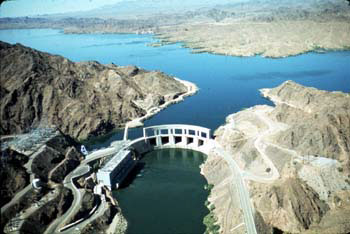
- Parker Dam on Lake Havasu where Colorado River waters are initially drawn into the system
- Coordinates: 34°17′23″N 114°10′19″W
- Begins: Lake Havasu, San Bernardino County; 34°17′24″N 114°10′20″W
- Ends: Lake Mathews, Riverside County; 33°50′14″N 117°22′41″W
- Maintained by: Metropolitan Water District of Southern California

Characteristics
- Total length: 242 mi (389 km)
- Capacity: 1,600 cu ft/s (45 m^{3}/s)

History
- Construction start: 1933
- Opened: 7 January 1939

Location
- Interactive map of Colorado River Aqueduct

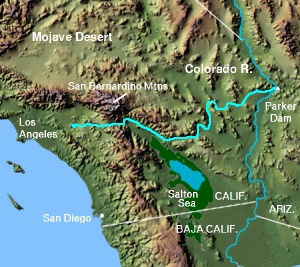
Map of the Colorado River Aqueduct

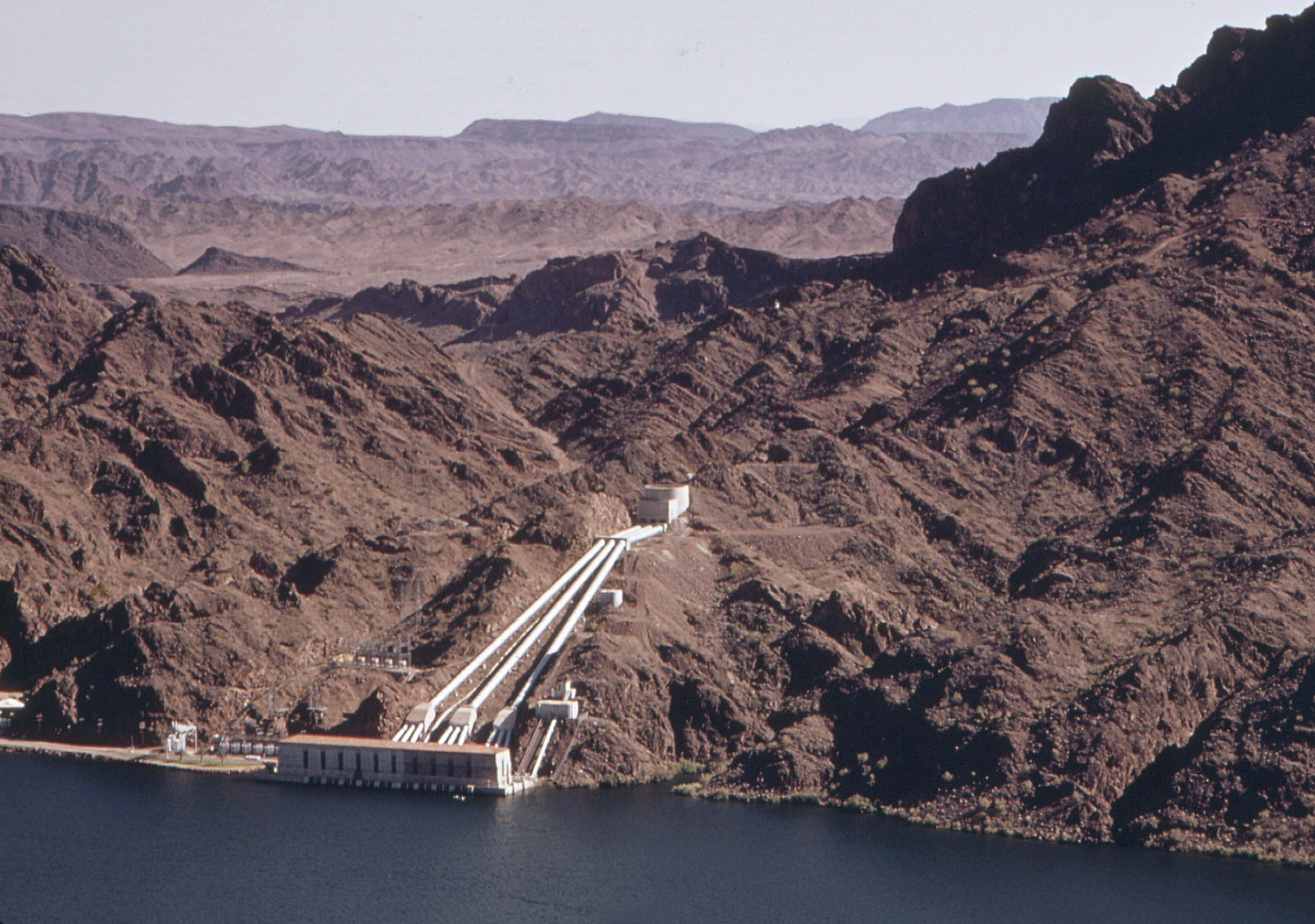
Whitsett Pumping Plant, located on Lake Havasu reservoir, lifts water 291 feet (89 m) for the Colorado River Aqueduct, on the California side.

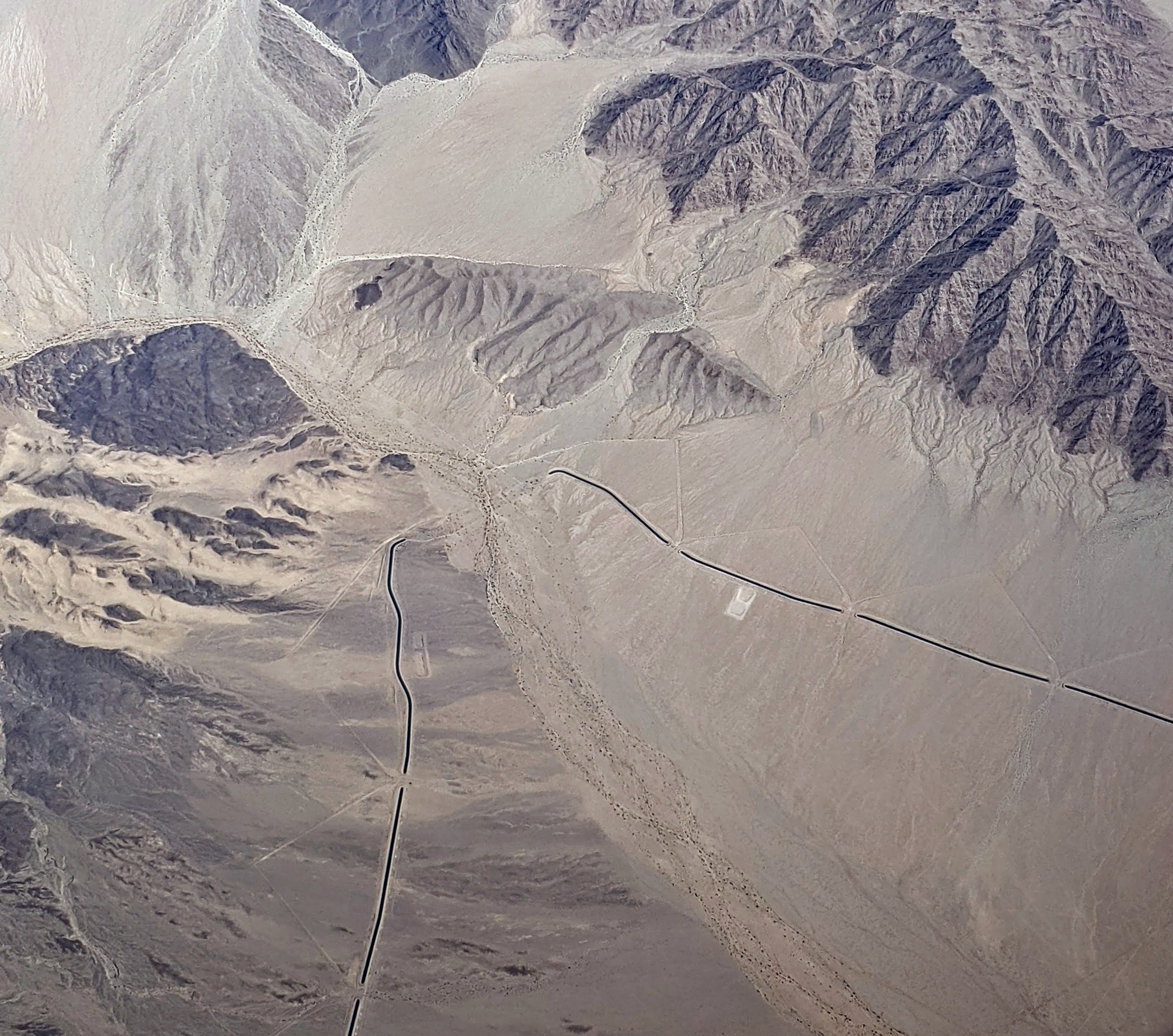
Colorado River Aqueduct near Joshua Tree National Park, including Pinto Wash Syphon, north of Desert Center

The Colorado River Aqueduct, or CRA, is a 242 mi (389 km) water conveyance in Southern California in the United States, operated by the Metropolitan Water District of Southern California. The aqueduct impounds water from the Colorado River at Lake Havasu on the California–Arizona border, west across the Mojave and Colorado deserts to the east side of the Santa Ana Mountains. It is one of the primary sources of drinking water for Southern California.

Originally conceived by William Mulholland and designed by Chief Engineer Frank E. Weymouth of the MWD, it was the largest public works project in southern California during the Great Depression. The project employed 30,000 people over an eight-year period and as many as 10,000 at one time.

The system is composed of two reservoirs, five pumping stations, 62 mi (100 km) of canals, 92 mi (148 km) of tunnels, and 84 mi (135 km) of buried conduit and siphons. Average annual throughput is 1,200,000 acre⋅ft (1.5 km^{3}).

== Route ==
The Colorado River Aqueduct begins near Parker Dam on the Colorado River. There, the water is pumped up the Whipple Mountains where the water emerges and begins flowing through 60 mi (97 km) of siphons and open canals on the southern Mojave Desert. At Iron Mountain, the water is again lifted, 144 ft (44 m). The aqueduct then turns southwest towards the Eagle Mountains. There the water is lifted two more times, first by 438 ft (134 m) to an elevation of more than 1,400 ft (430 m), then by 441 ft (134 m) to an elevation of 1,800 ft (550 m) above sea level. The CRA then runs through the deserts of the Coachella Valley and through the San Gorgonio Pass. Near Cabazon, the aqueduct begins to run underground until it enters the San Jacinto Tunnel at the base of the San Jacinto Mountains. On the other side of the mountains the aqueduct continues to run underground until it reaches the terminus at Lake Mathews. From there, 156 mi (251 km) of distribution lines, along with eight more tunnels, delivers water to member cities. Some of the water is siphoned off in San Jacinto via the San Diego canal, part of the San Diego Aqueduct that delivers water to San Diego County.

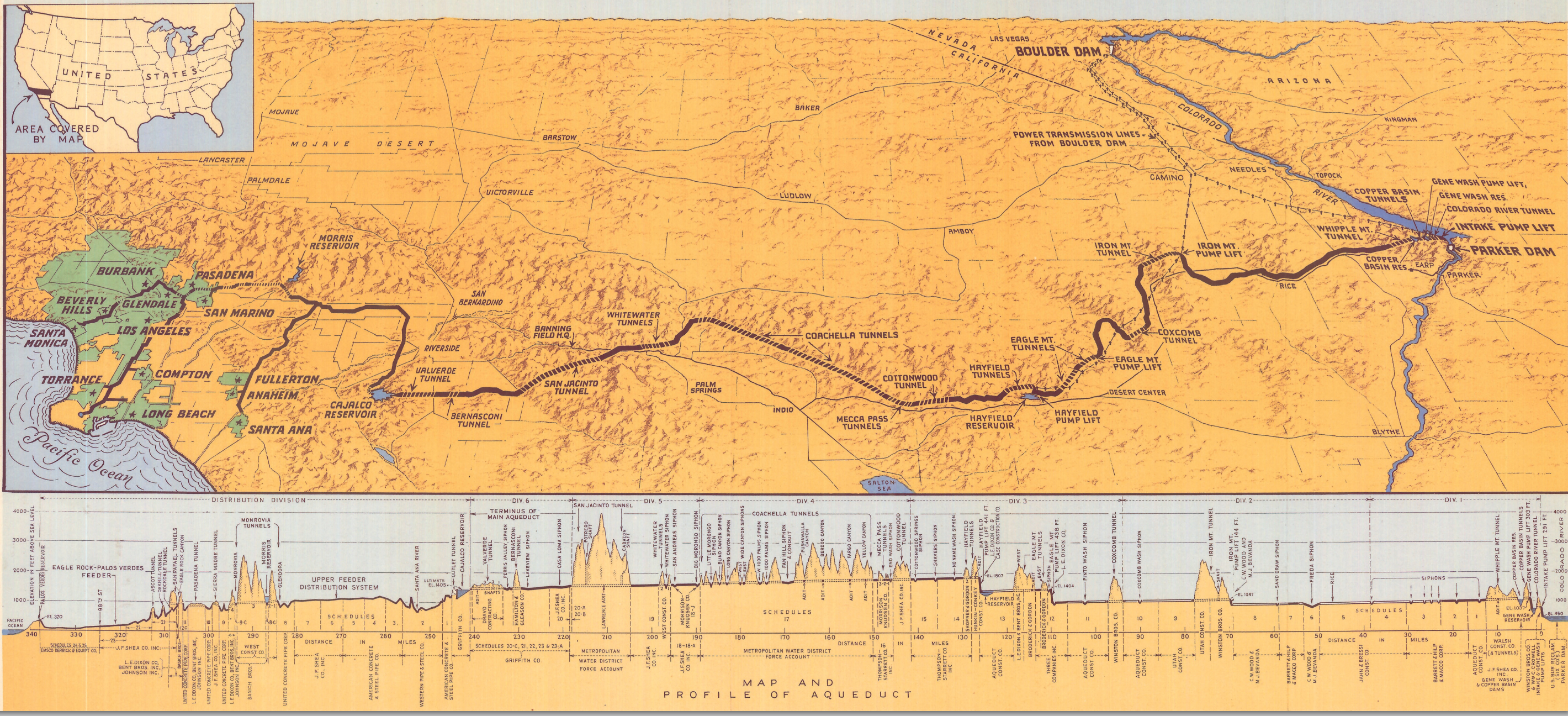
Map from The Metropolitan Water District of Southern California, History and First Annual Report for the Period Ending June 30, 1938. F. E. Weymouth, General Manager and Chief Engineer, Los Angeles 1939.

== Background and construction ==
As the Los Angeles metropolitan area grew in the early 1900s, Mulholland and others began looking for new sources of water. Eventually, Los Angeles laid claim to the waters of the Owens Valley, east of the Sierra Nevada, and in 1913 completed the 240-mile (390 km) Los Angeles Aqueduct to deliver its waters to the burgeoning city. By the early 1920s, Los Angeles had grown so rapidly that the Owens River watershed could no longer supply the city's needs for domestic and agricultural water. By 1923, Mulholland and his engineers were looking east to an even larger water supply, the Colorado River. The plan was to dam the Colorado River and carry its waters across hundreds of miles of mountains and deserts. In 1924, the first steps were taken to create a metropolitan water district, made up of various cities throughout southern California. The Metropolitan Water District ("Met") was incorporated on December 6, 1928, and in 1929 took over where Los Angeles had left off, planning for a Colorado River aqueduct. (During the same period, as a hedge against the possible abandonment of the planned Colorado River aqueduct, Los Angeles also undertook an extension of the Los Angeles Aqueduct to the Mono Lake Basin.)

The MWD considered eight routes for the aqueduct. In 1931, the MWD board of directors chose the Parker route which would require the building of the Parker Dam. The Parker route was chosen because it was seen as the safest and most economical. A $220 million bond was approved on September 29, 1931. Work began in January 1933 near Thousand Palms, and in 1934 the United States Bureau of Reclamation began work on the Parker Dam. Construction of the aqueduct was finished in 1935. Water first flowed in the aqueduct on January 7, 1939.

The CRA contributed to urban growth in the south coast region. Although the CRA brought "too much, too expensive" water in its early years of operation, subsidies (via property taxes) and expansion of MWD's service area brought reduced prices and expanded demand. (Holding supply constant, that meant that the quantity demanded rose to meet supplies.) By 1954, Met's revenue from selling water exceeded the cost of delivering it. By 1973, revenue from sales exceeded revenue from taxes. Since about 80 percent of Met's costs are fixed, revenue needed to cover far more than operating expenses in order to pay for all costs.

In 1955, the aqueduct was recognized by the American Society of Civil Engineers (ASCE) as one of their "Seven Modern Civil Engineering Wonders".

== In popular culture ==
The Colorado River Aqueduct was featured by Huell Howser in California's Gold.

== See also ==
- San Jacinto Tunnel
- Kaleshwaram Lift Irrigation Project
- Ganga Water Lift Project
- Los Angeles Aqueduct
