= Big Maria Mountains =

Mountain range in southern California

- Maria Grandes
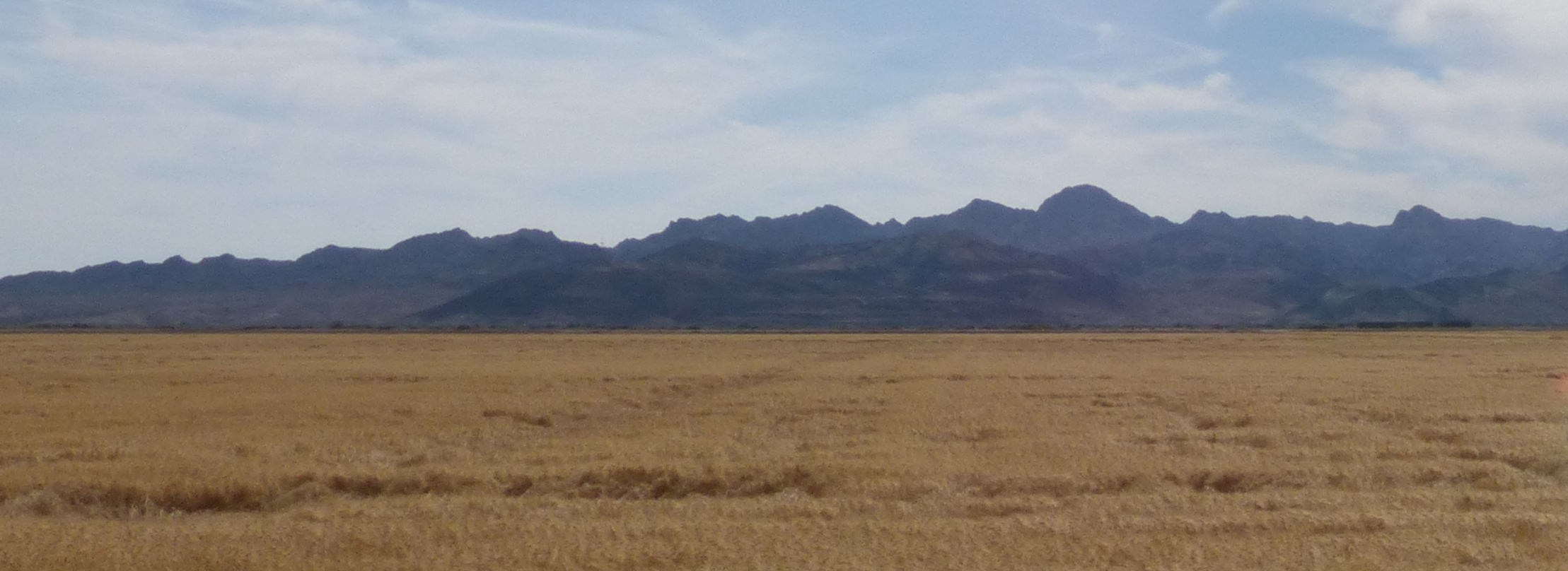
- A view of the Big Maria Mountains from the Parker Valley

Highest point
- Elevation: 3,383 ft (1,031 m)

Geography
- Location within California
- Country: United States
- State: California
- District: Riverside County
- Range coordinates: 33°51′0″N 114°42′3″W
- Topo map: USGS Big Maria Mountains SW

The Big Maria Mountains are located in the southeastern part of the U.S. state of California, near the Colorado River and Arizona. The range lies between Blythe and Vidal, and west of U.S. Route 95 in California and east of Midland. The mountains are home to the Eagle Nest Mine and reach an elevation of 1,030 m (3,380 ft). A power line that runs from Parker Dam to Yuma, Arizona runs through the range. A smaller range, the Little Maria Mountains, lie to the west of the Big Marias.

The Big Marias are an Area of Critical Environmental Concern administered by the Bureau of Land Management.

== Geology ==
The Big Maria Mountains are one of several ranges that constitute the Maria fold and thrust belt (MFTB). The MFTB underwent generally thick-skinned (involving basement rocks) north–south trending crustal shortening in the Cretaceous. The structures of the MFTB are exposed by to later generally east–west trending large-scale crustal extension in the Miocene, through what is known to geologists as the Colorado River Extensional Corridor

This north–south shortening is anomalous, as crustal shortening in the rest of the North American Cordillera is oriented generally east–west because of the generally east–west compression that was due to the subduction of the Farallon plate under western North America. Also unlike the rest of the North American Cordillera, deformation in the MFTB involved rocks of the North American Craton, most notably the Grand Canyon sequence of sedimentary rocks.

== Ecology ==
Foxtail cactus (Escobaria vivipara subsp.) and California barrel cactus (Ferocactus cylindraceus) dot the landscape, and a Burro mule deer (Odocoileus hemionus var. eremicus) herd relies on the Colorado River for survival.

== Wilderness area ==
The Big Maria Mountains Wilderness Area is managed by the Bureau of Land Management for recreation and nature reserve protection.

The terrain of the Big Maria Mountains within the wilderness area varies from gently sloping Alluvial fans (bajadas) to numerous rough, craggy peaks disjointed by steep canyons. The northern boundary lies south of a major drainage known as Big Wash, and the eastern edge parallels U.S. Route 95 in California and the Colorado River. The west and south boundaries follow power lines and contours along the base of the mountains.

== Rice Valley Wilderness ==
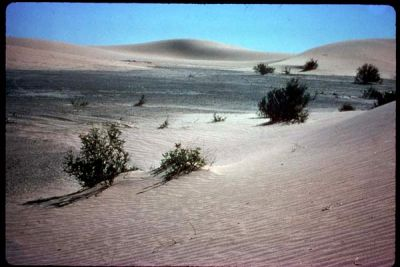
Sand dunes in Rice Valley

The Bureau of Land Management also manages the Rice Valley Wilderness in and near the Big Maria Mountains.

The broad, flat plains of Rice Valley and the northwestern tip of the steep and rugged Big Maria Mountains lie within the borders of this wilderness. A system of small dunes rising 30 to 40 feet above the surface form a long, narrow band running through the middle of the valley floor. The valley is part of a massive Erg-sand sheet which extends from Cadiz Valley through Ward Valley, representing a part of one of the largest dune systems in the Desert Region of California. The Big Maria Mountains rise above the valley to an elevation of 2,000 feet.

== See also ==
- Little Maria Mountains
