= Rice, California =

Unincorporated community in California, United States

- Ghost town
- Location within the state of California Rice, California (the United States)
- Coordinates: 34°5′1″N 114°50′59″W
- Country: United States
- State: California
- County: San Bernardino
- Elevation: 832 ft (254 m)

Population (2000)
  - Total: 0
- Time zone: UTC-8 (Pacific (PST))
  - Summer (DST): UTC-7 (PDT)
- GNIS feature ID: 248157

Rice, formerly named Blythe Junction, is a ghost town in the Rice Valley and the southern tip of the Mojave Desert, and within unincorporated San Bernardino County, southern California.

== History ==
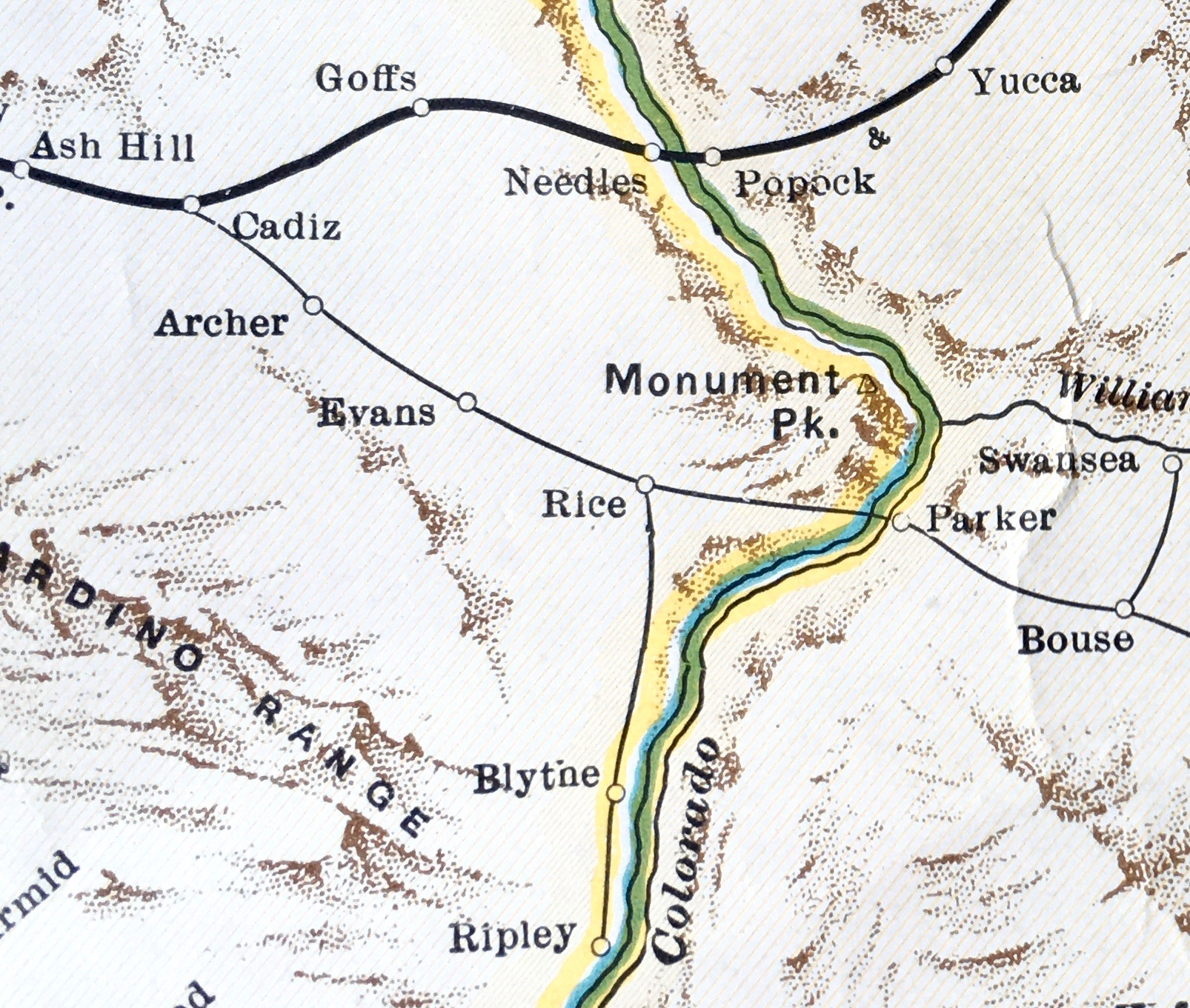
Route in 1930

The town, located on present-day California State Route 62 between Twentynine Palms and the Colorado River, grew around a Santa Fe Railroad subdivision and siding. The subdivision and siding are still in use, but have since changed hands and currently belong to the Arizona and California Railroad, a short line serving southeastern California from Rice to Cadiz, California, and southwestern Arizona at Parker. It was the starting point of the abandoned Ripley Branch that goes through Blythe to Ripley, California.

== Rice Army Airfield/Rice Airport ==
To the east of Rice is the Rice Municipal Airport, which was acquired by the United States Army's 4th Air Support Command in 1942 as a sub-base of Thermal Army Airfield, and was operational by the end of the year. While the airfield's date of construction is unknown, it was not depicted on a 1932 Los Angeles Airways Chart, indicating construction sometime in the ten years between 1932 and 1942. Rice Army Airfield consisted of two intersecting paved 5,000 foot runways and numerous dispersal pads south of the runways. In 1944 the airfield was transferred from Thermal Army Airfield to March Field. Operations at Rice Field were ended by August 1944, and the field was declared surplus on October 31, 1944.

The desert training area near Rice Army Airfield was at one time considered as the site for the world's first atomic-bomb test ("Trinity"), and in fact was the second-choice site. Instead, a site near Alamogordo, New Mexico, was chosen.

== Rice Shoe Tree ==
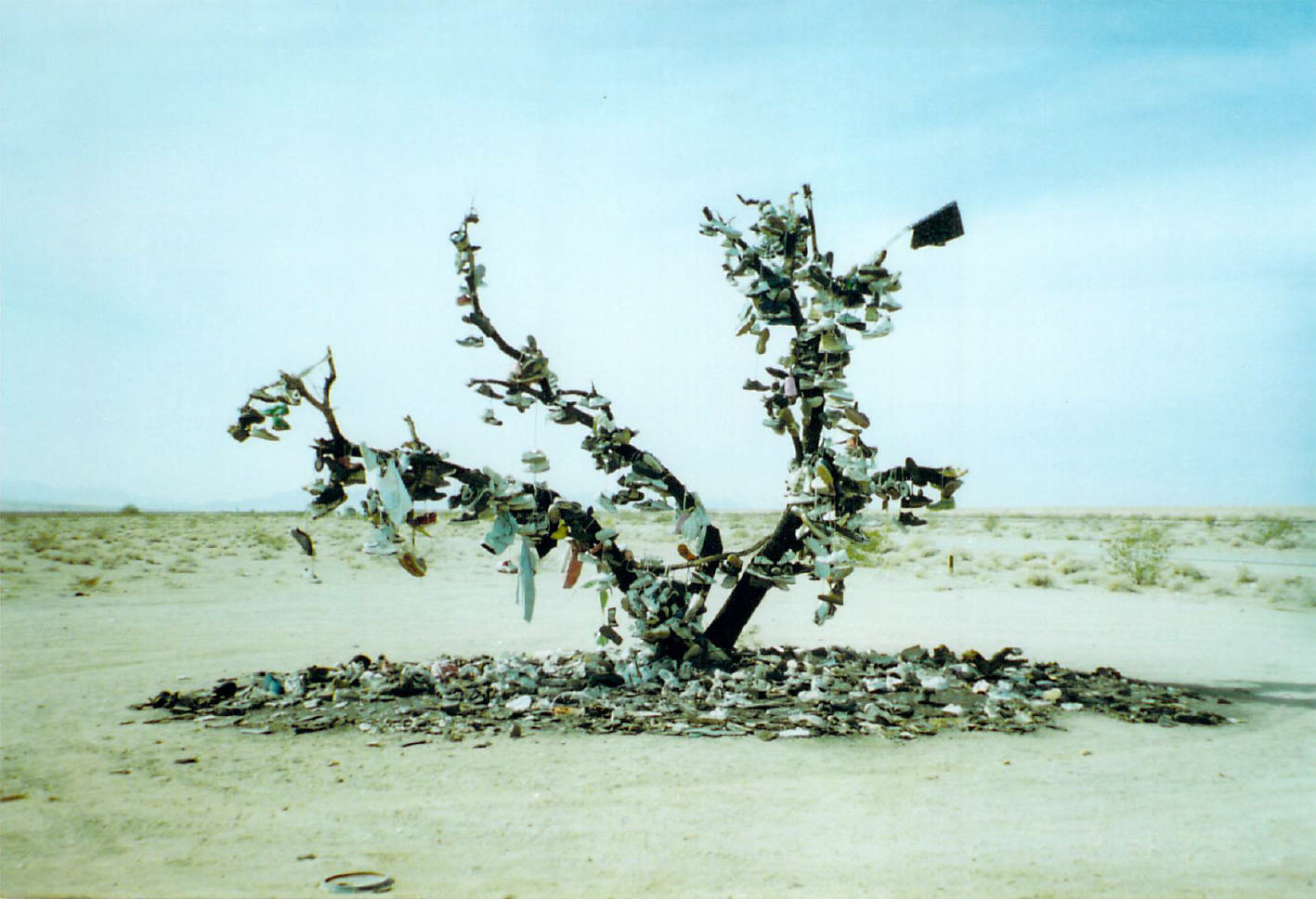
Rice CA Shoe Tree

Rice became noted for its Shoe Tree, originally an underwear tree, a lone tamarisk on a turnout just south of the highway, adjacent to the main entrance to Rice Army Airfield. A hallmark for a trailer-based business that catered to personnel at what is now the Marine Corps Air Ground Combat Center Twentynine Palms, customers passing on Highway 62 (also known as Rice Road) to and from the Colorado River would toss a pair of underwear in the tree's branches. After a fire burned most of the tree and all the underwear, the custom changed and the tree's burned husk became a collection point for old shoes. The tree was featured on California's Gold, a PBS program hosted by Huell Howser. The tree burned flush to the ground in 2003 after which a 'shoe garden' (a fence on which people hang shoes) replaced it. In early 2016, road trippers began throwing their shoes on top of Rice's abandoned gas station. Also in the immediate area, travelers occasionally stop to spell their names and initials on the nearby Arizona and California Railroad right-of-way with the multi-colored volcanic rock used as track ballast. Hand-assembled graffiti lines the railroad for the entire distance that it parallels Highway 62.

== Present day ==
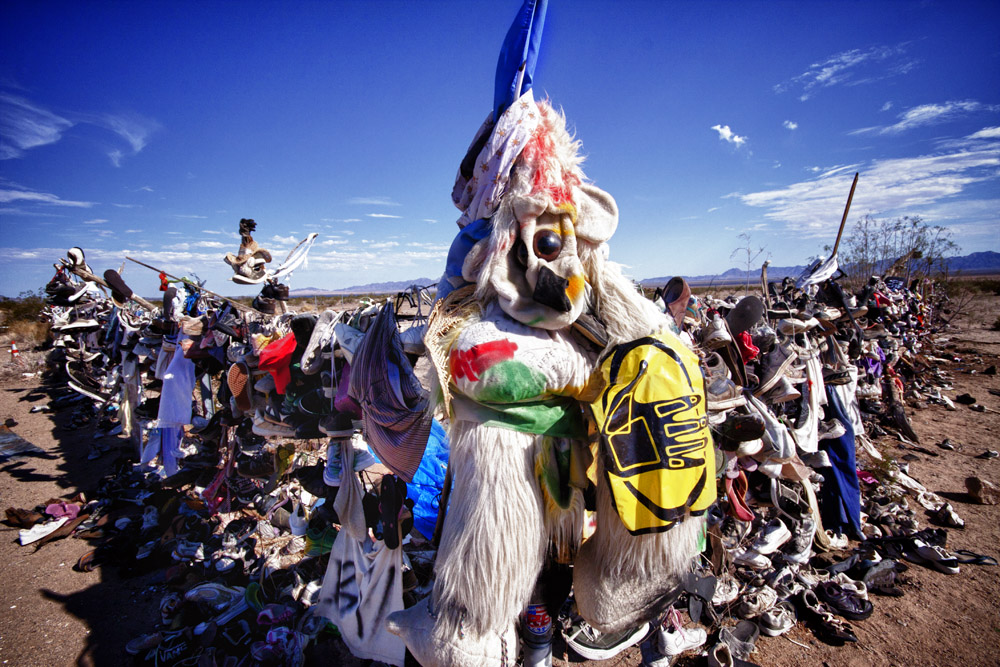
Shot of the Shoe Fence – July 28, 2011

At some point during the period 1944–48, Rice Army Airfield was renamed Rice Airport and began operations as a public civilian airport, housing a small flight school for missionaries. Between 1952 and 1955, Rice Airport was changed to a private field, and by 1960 it had been abandoned. As of 2007, no standing structures remain and little evidence exists of the airport's former existence.

There are no standing buildings and no residents in Rice at present. A hand-painted sign on the western outskirts of the town once announced that the townsite was for sale, but that sign has since been removed. The only building which remains in any condition is a demolished service station.

Parts of the movie Fast Five were filmed near Rice in 2010 and it was released the following year. Rice was featured during the train scene at the beginning of the movie.

== See also ==
- List of ghost towns in California
