= List of Madrean Sky Island mountain ranges – Sonoran – Chihuahuan Deserts =

This is a list of mountain ranges in the Madrean Sky Islands ecoregion within the Sonoran and Chihuahuan Deserts of the Southwestern United States and northwestern Mexico. The list is presented both alphabetically and by political territory. The elevation (in feet) of the highest point in each range is indicated in parentheses.

== Alphabetical list ==
- Animas Mountains (8565)—Hidalgo County, New Mexico
- Atascosa Mountains (6440)—Santa Cruz County, Arizona
- Baboquivari Mountains (Arizona) (7730)—Pima County, Arizona
- Chiricahua Mountains (9759)—Cochise County, Arizona
- Dos Cabezas Mountains (8354)—Cochise County, Arizona
- Dragoon Mountains (7512)—Cochise County, Arizona
- Galiuro Mountains (7663)—Cochise, Graham, and Gila counties, Arizona)
- Guadalupe Mountains (5280)—Hidalgo County, New Mexico, and Cochise County, Arizona
- Huachuca Mountains (9466)—Cochise and Santa Cruz counties, Arizona, and Sonora, Mexico
- Little Dragoon Mountains (6588)—Cochise County, Arizona
- Little Rincon Mountains (6114)—Cochise and Pima counties, Arizona
- Mule Mountains (7370)—Cochise County, Arizona
- Mustang Mountains (6440)—Santa Cruz County, Arizona
- Pajarito Mountains (5236)—Santa Cruz County, Arizona
- Patagonia Mountains (7221)—Santa Cruz County, Arizona
- Pedrogosa Mountains ( ? )—Cochise County, Arizona
- Peloncillo Mountains (Cochise County) (5551)—Cochise, Graham, and Greenlee counties, Arizona
- Peloncillo Mountains (Hidalgo County) (6928)—Hidalgo County, New Mexico
- Perilla Mountains ( ? )—Cochise County, Arizona
- Pinal Mountains (7848)—Gila County, Arizona
- Pinaleño Mountains (10720)—Graham County, Arizona
- Pozo Verde Mountains (4885)—Pima County, Arizona
- Quinlan Mountains (5014)—Pima County, Arizona
- Rincon Mountains (8664)—Pima County, Arizona
- San Cayento Mountains (6007)—Santa Cruz County, Arizona
- San Luis Mountains (5369)—Pima County, Arizona
- Santa Catalina Mountains (9157)—Pima and Pinal counties, Arizona
- Santa Rita Mountains (8585)—Santa Cruz and Pima counties, Arizona
- Santa Teresa Mountains (8282)—Graham County, Arizona
- Sierra del Tigre (7742)—Sonora, Mexico
- Sierra La Esmeralda ( ? )—Sonora, Mexico
- Sierra San Antonio ( ? )—Santa Cruz County, Arizona, and Sonora, Mexico
- Sierra San Jose ( ? )—Sonora, Mexico
- Sierra San Luis (8144)—Sonora and Chihuahua, Mexico
- Sierrita Mountains (6188)—Pima County, Arizona
- Superstition Mountains (6266)—Gila, Maricopa, and Pinal counties, Arizona
- Swisshelm Mountains (7185)—Cochise County, Arizona
- Tortolita Mountains (4652)—Pima County, Arizona
- Tumacácori Mountains (5606)—Santa Cruz County, Arizona
- Whetstone Mountains (7711)—Cochise County, Arizona
- Winchester Mountains ( ? )—Cochise County, Arizona

== Mexico ==
=== Chihuahua ===
- Sierra San Luis

=== Sonora ===
- Huachuca Mountains
- Sierra del Tigre
- Sierra La Esmeralda
- Sierra San Antonio
- Sierra San Jose
- Sierra San Luis

== United States ==
=== Arizona ===
==== Cochise County ====
- Chiricahua Mountains
- Dos Cabezas Mountains
- Dragoon Mountains
- Galiuro Mountains
- Guadalupe Mountains
- Huachuca Mountains
- Little Dragoon Mountains
- Little Rincon Mountains
- Mule Mountains
- Pedrogosa Mountains
- Peloncillo Mountains (Cochise County)
- Perilla Mountains
- Swisshelm Mountains
- Whetstone Mountains
- Winchester Mountains

==== Gila County ====
- Galiuro Mountains
- Pinal Mountains
- Superstition Mountains

==== Graham County ====
- Galiuro Mountains
- Peloncillo Mountains (Cochise County)
- Pinaleño Mountains
- Santa Teresa Mountains

==== Greenlee County ====
- Peloncillo Mountains (Cochise County)

==== Maricopa County ====
- Superstition Mountains

==== Pima County ====
- Baboquivari Mountains (Arizona)
- Little Rincon Mountains
- Pozo Verde Mountains
- Quinlan Mountains
- Rincon Mountains
- San Luis Mountains
- Santa Catalina Mountains
- Santa Rita Mountains
- Sierrita Mountains
- Tortolita Mountains

==== Pinal County ====
- Santa Catalina Mountains
- Superstition Mountains

==== Santa Cruz County ====
- Atascosa Mountains
- Huachuca Mountains
- Mustang Mountains
- Pajarito Mountains
- Patagonia Mountains
- San Cayetano Mountains
- Santa Rita Mountains
- Sierra San Antonio
- Tumacácori Mountains

=== New Mexico ===
==== Hidalgo County ====
- Animas Mountains
- Guadalupe Mountains
- Peloncillo Mountains (Hidalgo County)

== See also ==
- Madrean Region
- List of mountain ranges of the Sonoran Desert
- List of mountain ranges of Arizona
- List of mountain ranges of New Mexico
