= Atascosa Mountains =

Landform in Santa Cruz County, Arizona

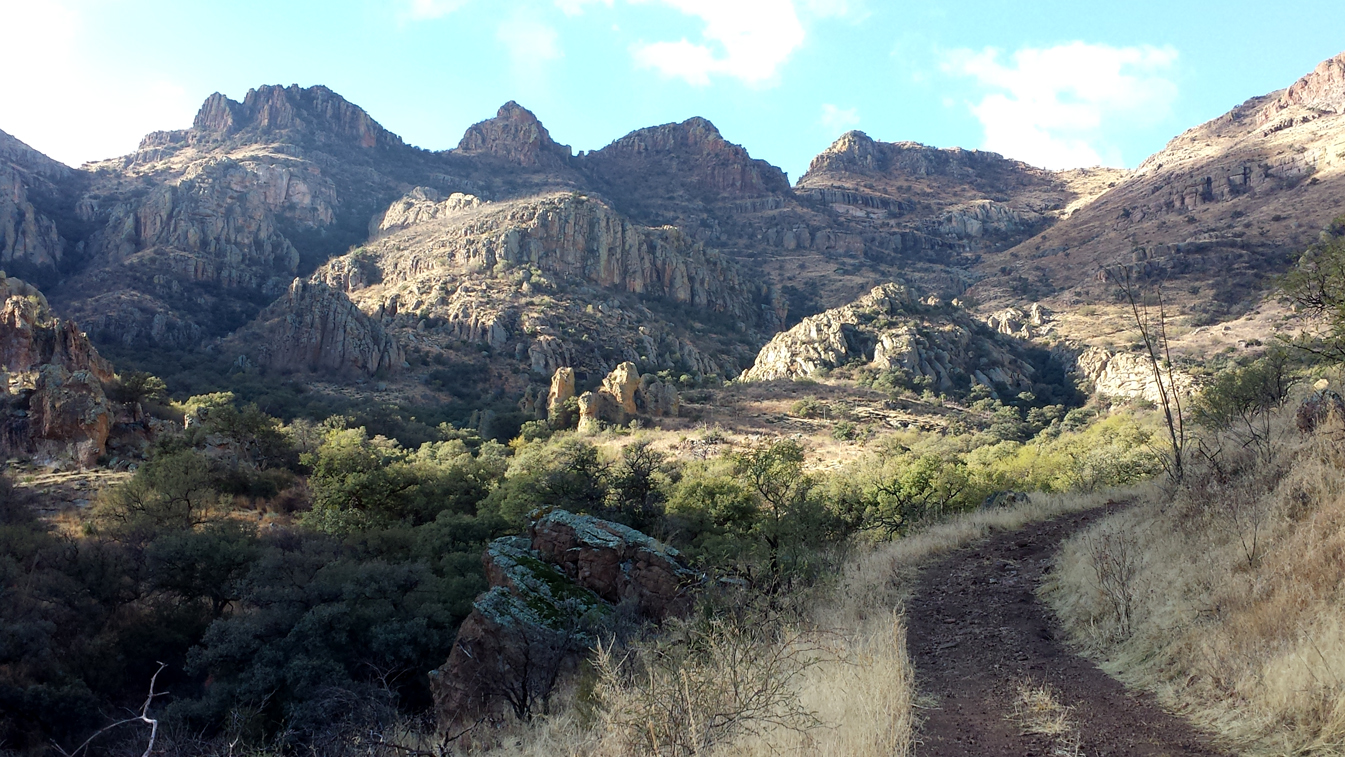
- Rock Corral Canyon in the Atascosa Mountains, December 2013

Highest point
- Peak: Atascosa Peak
- Elevation: 6,440 ft (1,960 m)
- Coordinates: 31.4325947°N 111.1467589°W

Dimensions
- Length: 6 mi (9.7 km) N-S & E-W
- Width: 6 mi (9.7 km)

Geography
- Location within Arizona Location within the United States
- Country: United States
- State: Arizona
- Region(s): Sonoran Desert (N & NE)
- Borders on: Tumacacori Mountains (N); Pajarito Mountains (S); Arivaca Lake (SW); Tumacacori's (NW)

The Atascosa Mountains is a mountain range in western Santa Cruz County, Arizona, United States. It is sandwiched between the larger Tumacacori Mountains to the north, and a small east–west border range to the south, the Pajarito Mountains; the Pajaritos are on the U.S.–Mexico border and abut the Sierra La Esmeralda range in northern Sonora.

== Description ==
The Pajarito and Atascosa Mountains are the central ranges in the Tumacacori Highlands.

The highest peak is Atascosa Peak at 6,440 feet (1,963 m); adjacent to the northeast is Ramanote Peak, 6,047 feet (1,843 m). Pena Blanca Lake on Ruby Road, arising from the lowest elevations of Calabasas Canyon–(tributary to the Santa Cruz River) are part of the Atascosa's southern border. Ruby Road continues beyond the west of the Atascosa's and Peck Canyon Road borders the north, but accesses highest elevations in the ranges' center and north.

== Tumacacori Highlands ==
The Tumacacori Highlands is a series of connected mountain ranges in western Santa Cruz County. The Highlands are northwest of Nogales and are bordered on the east by the Santa Cruz River Valley, that is traversed north–south by Interstate 19. Across the valley eastwards are the tall Santa Rita Mountains in the northeast, and the smaller San Cayetano Mountains, east and adjacent to Nogales's northeast. The sequence of the north-to-south Tumacacori Highlands is as follows:

North to south:

1. Tumacacori Mountains
2. Peck Canyon–(Peck Canyon Road)
3. Atascosa Mountains – (6 mi × 9 mi)
4. Ruby Road-(to Ruby, Arizona); Pena Blanca Lake
5. Pajarito Mountains
6. Mexico-Arizona border
7. Sierra La Esmeralda – (the Emerald Mountains)

A Santa Cruz county-border "bootheel" extends southwest; the bootheel contains Cobre Ridge, and it is connected northwest to a small range, the San Luis Mountains which are in the southeast of the Altar Valley, and borders the Buenos Aires National Wildlife Refuge.

Historical mission communities, at Tumacacori National Historical Park, in Tumacacori, lie at the southeast foothills of the Tumacacori Mountains.

== See also ==
- List of mountain ranges of Arizona
