= Brawley Wash =

Stream in Pima County, Arizona

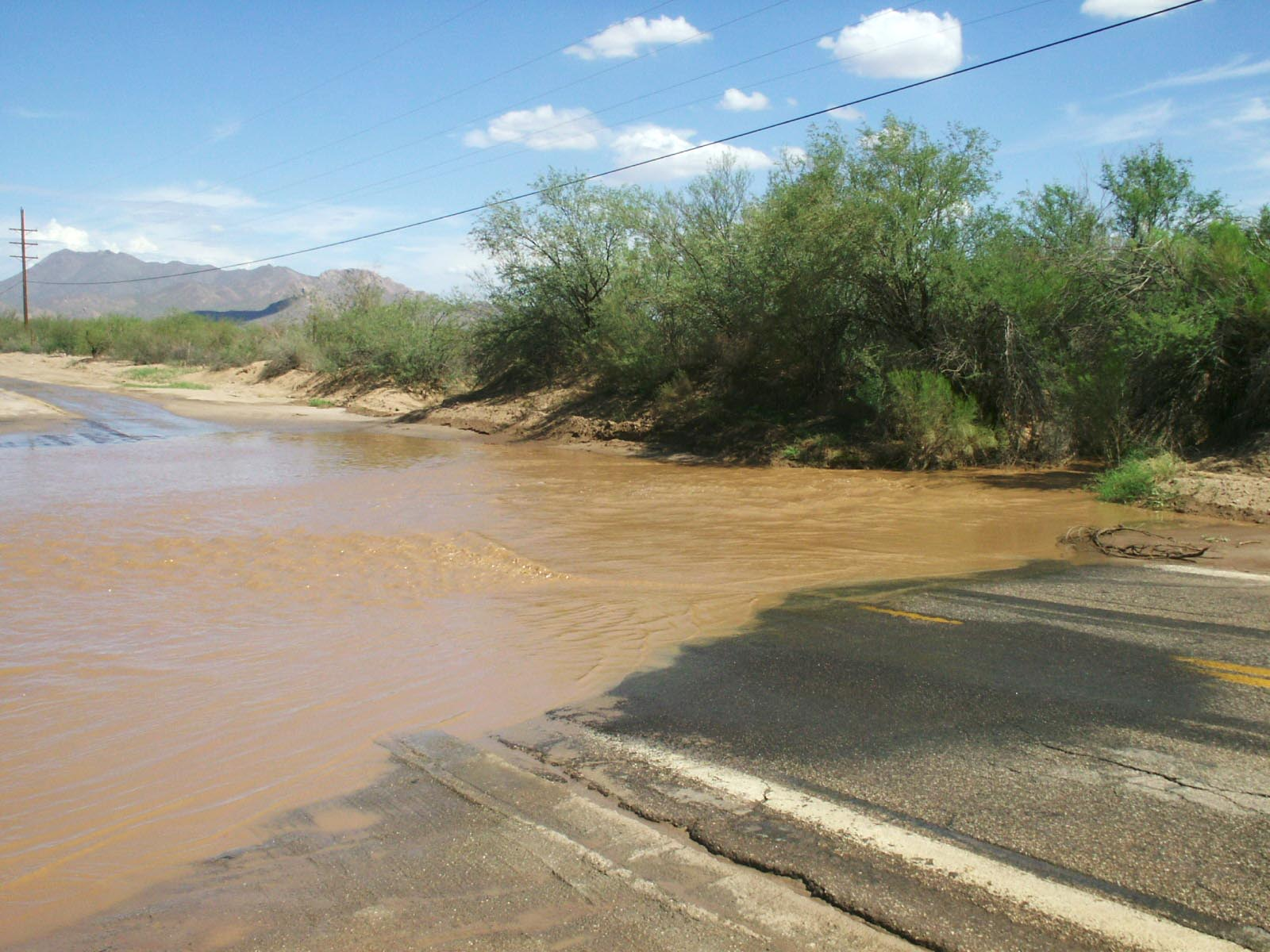
- Brawley Wash spills onto a road during flash flood conditions.

Location
- Country: United States

Physical characteristics
- Mouth
  - elevation: 1,939 ft (591 m)

Brawley Wash is an ephemeral stream, tributary to the Santa Cruz River, located in Pima County. Its source is in the Altar Valley between the Sierrita and Coyote Mountains at 31°58′20″N 111°23′29″W, at the confluence of the Altar and Alambre washes along Arizona State Route 286. It flows north-north east through the Altar Valley and turns north as it enters Avra Valley near Robles Junction (also known as Three Points) where Arizona State Route 86 crosses the streambed. The wash traverses the Avra Valley between the Roskruge Mountains and the Tucson Mountains. It joins the Santa Cruz east of the Samaniego Hills of the Silver Bell Mountains. The wash is known as the Los Robles Wash near its junction with the Santa Cruz approximately six miles west of Avra and Interstate 10.

The name is supported by the Geographic Names Information System.
