= Pajarito Mountains (Arizona) =

Mountain range in the US state of Arizona and the Mexican state of Sonora

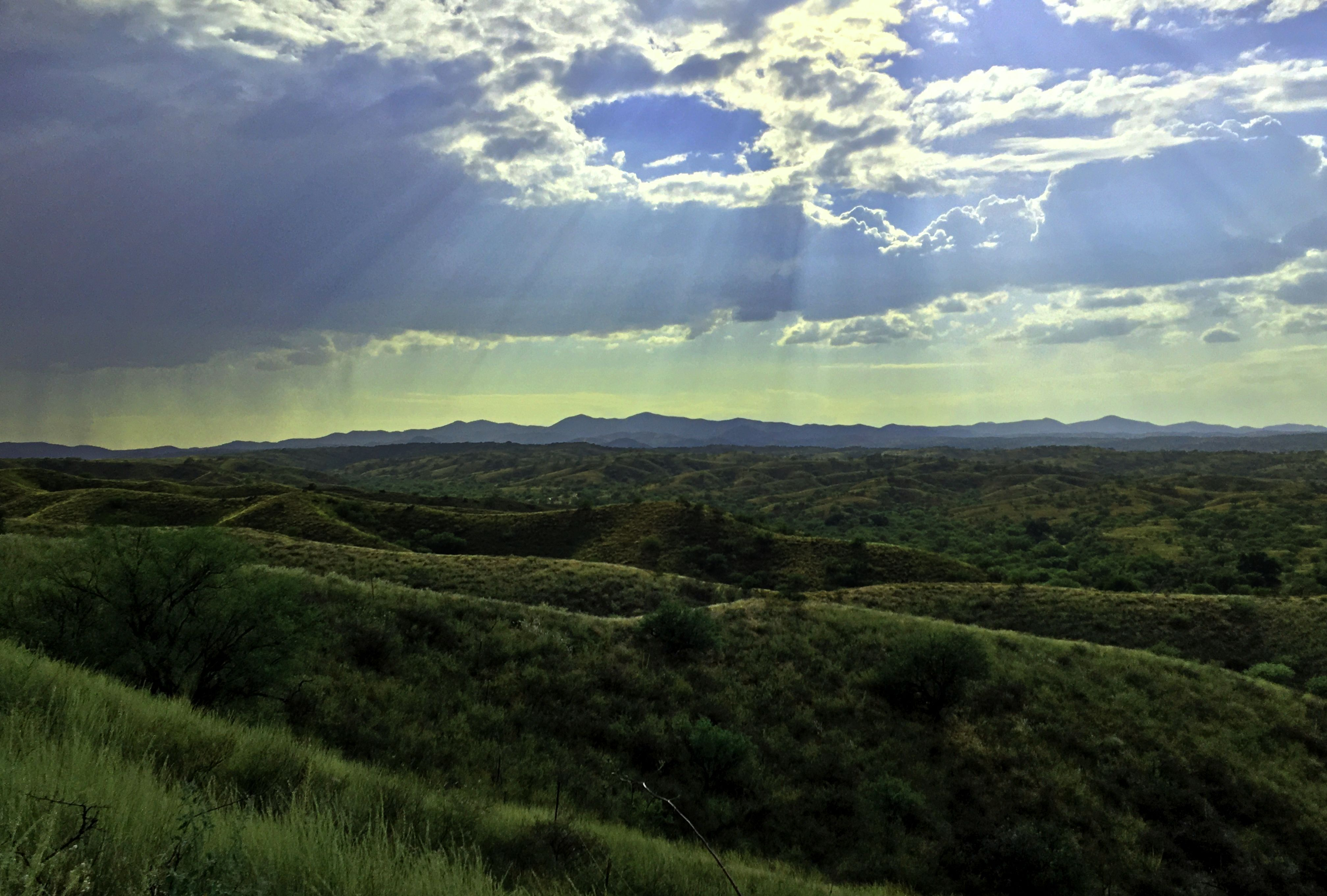
- Looking west towards the Pajarito Mountains from Nogales, Arizona. The international border between the U.S. and Mexico crosses the mountains.

Highest point
- Peak: Pajarito Peak
- Elevation: 4,629 ft (1,411 m)
- Coordinates: 31°21′05″N 111°05′58″W

Dimensions
- Length: 6 mi (9.7 km) N-S
- Width: 12 mi (19 km) E-W

Geography
- Location within Arizona
- Countries: United States, Mexico
- States: Arizona and Sonora
- Regions: Tumacacori Highlands and Sonoran Desert
- District: Santa Cruz County, Arizona
- Borders on: Atascosa Mountains, Peña Blanca Lake, U.S.-Mexico border and Sierra La Esmeralda

The Pajarito Mountains is a small mountain range of western Santa Cruz County, Arizona, United States, that extend south into Sonora, Mexico. The range is adjacent the Atascosa Mountains at its north, with both ranges in the center of a north–south sequence of ranges called the Tumacacori Highlands. The Highlands have the Tumacacori Mountains at the north, and south of the U.S.-Mexico border, the Sierra La Esmeralda range (the Emerald Mountains). The Tumacacori Highlands are part of a regional conservancy study of "travel corridors" for cats, called Cuatro Gatos, Four Cats, for mountain lions, ocelot, bobcat, and jaguar.

The lower elevation Cerro Colorado Mountains to the northwest, and the San Luis Mountains, west are also part of the Highlands region. At the west of the Pajaritos and adjacent to the San Luis range, and Cobre Ridge peaks, is the Pajarita Wilderness. East of the Highlands is the Santa Cruz River Valley corridor.

== Range specifics ==
The highest peak in the range is Pajarito Peak at 5,236 feet (1,596 m) due south of Peña Blanca Lake; the peak is at the headwaters of Calabasas and Pesquiera Canyons. In the west of the range at the Pajarita Wilderness, a water divide makes some drainages flow south into northern Sonora. The other drainages flow northeast to the Santa Cruz River, or northwest to the north-flowing Altar Valley. Cobre Ridge at the northwest merges into the southwest San Luis Mountains, and the peaks of Cobre Ridge range from Black Peak, 5,086 feet (1,550 m) in the northwest, Cobre Mountain, then Bartlett Mountain, 4,107 feet (1,252 m) and Flat Top Mountain, 4,222 feet (1,287 m) at the west of the Pajarita Wilderness.

Nogales, Arizona and Nogales, Sonora lie at the eastern foothills of the range in the upper region of the north–south Santa Cruz River Valley, and in the I-19 corridor.

Peña Blanca Lake is a mountainous getaway site, about 8 mi on Ruby Road from I-19. Ruby Road continues about 25 miles, much on unimproved surfaces, through the mountains to the area of the ghost town site of Ruby, Arizona, just northwest of the Pajarita Wilderness, and east of Cobre Ridge, and then loops back eastward to I-19 at Amado.

Two common trails of the mountain area are the Atascosa Lookout, and the Sycamore Canyon Trail (for the Arizona sycamore, Platanus wrightii). As part of southeast Arizona, southwest New Mexico, Sonora and northwest Chihuahua's Madrean Sky Islands, mountainous sky island region, birdwatching finds these mountain sites as prime locales for bird species ranging north out of the Sierra Madre Occidental cordillera. (One sought after example is the elegant trogon species.)

The highest peak, Pajarito Peak, is located at 31°21′38″N 111°05′13″W.

== The Tumacacori Highlands ==
The Tumacacori Highlands is a series of connected mountain ranges in western Santa Cruz County, Arizona. The Highlands are northwest of Nogales and are bordered on the east by the Santa Cruz River Valley, that is traversed north–south by Interstate 19. Across the valley eastwards are the tall Santa Rita Mountains in the northeast, and the smaller San Cayetano Mountains, east and adjacent to Nogales's northeast. The sequence of the north-to-south Tumacacori Highlands is as follows:

North-to-south:

1. Tumacacori Mountains
2. Peck Canyon (Peck Canyon Road)
3. Atascosa Mountains (6 mi x 9 mi)
4. Ruby Road (to Ruby, Arizona); Peña Blanca Lake
5. Pajarito Mountains
6. Mexico-Arizona border
7. Sierra La Esmeralda (the Emerald Mountains)

A Santa Cruz county-border "bootheel" extends southwest; the bootheel contains Cobre Ridge, and it is connected northwest to a small range, the San Luis Mountains which are in the southeast of the Altar Valley, and borders the Buenos Aires National Wildlife Refuge.

Historical mission communities, at Tumacacori National Historical Park, in Tumacacori lie at the southeast foothills of the Tumacacori Mountains.

== See also ==
- List of mountain ranges of Arizona
