= San Luis Mountains =

Range near Arizona's southern border

- Location within Arizona

Highest point
- Elevation: 4,797 ft (1,462 m)
- Coordinates: 31°30′34″N 111°24′09″W

Geography
- Country: United States
- State: Arizona
- Region: Sonoran Desert
- County: Pima County

The San Luis Mountains are a small, lower elevation mountain range of central-southern Pima County Arizona adjacent to the U.S.-Mexico border, northeast of Sasabe, Arizona–Sasabe, Sonora.

The range is northwest-southeast trending, about 10 miles (16 km) in length. The range borders the Buenos Aires National Wildlife Refuge to the west; both are in the southeast of the Altar Valley. The southeast of the range abuts Cobre Ridge, with various peaks, and Cobre Ridge borders the western edge of the Pajarito Wilderness, at the west end of the Pajarito Mountains.

The community of Arivaca lies in the valley northeast of the San Luis Mountains at the southeast end of the Las Guijas Mountains; Arivaca Lake lies about 5 mi upstream on Arivaca Wash. The International Border lies less than one mile south of the southern margin of the range in Fresnal Wash. Cumero Mountain Peak at 4,698 feet (1,432 m) is 2.1 miles (3.4 km) north of the border.

Two mountain ranges, the San Luis in the southwest, and the Cerro Colorado Mountains northwest lie west of the four-mountain sequence of the Tumacacori Highlands (of adjacent western Santa Cruz County) of the Tumacacori, Atascosa, Pajarito, and the Sierra La Esmeralda mountain ranges. The Highlands are now part of a conservancy study of wild cat 'travel corridor' usage between mountains, the study called Cuatros Gatos (Four Cats), for the mountain lions, bobcat, ocelot, and jaguar.
