= Sierra La Esmeralda =

Mountain range in northern Sonora, Mexico

Dimensions
- Length: 15 mi (24 km)
- Width: 15 mi (24 km)

Geography
- Country: Mexico
- State: Sonora
- Regions: Sonoran Desert and Tumacacori Highlands
- Cities: Nogales, Arizona and Nogales, Sonora
- Range coordinates: 31°10′N 111°07′W
- Borders on: Pajarito Mountains and U.S.-Mexico border

The Sierra La Esmeralda range, (Emerald Mountains) are a mountain range in northern Sonora, Mexico at the northern region of the Sierra Madre Occidental cordillera. The region contains sky island mountain ranges, called the Madrean Sky Islands, some separated from the Sierra Madre Occidental proper, and occurring in the northeastern Sonoran Desert, and extreme west-northwestern Chihuahuan Desert. Many of the ranges occur in southeast Arizona.

Sierra La Esmeralda anchors the southern portion of the Tumacacori Highlands. The range is part of a Sky Island Alliance study of wild cats, called Cuatros Gatos, (Four Cats).

Nogales, Arizona and Nogales, Sonora lie at the northeast of the range.

== Tumacacori Highlands ==
The Tumacacori Highlands is a series of connected mountain ranges in western Santa Cruz County, Arizona. The Highlands are northwest of Nogales and are bordered on the east by the Santa Cruz River Valley, that is traversed north–south by I-19. Across the valley eastwards are the tall Santa Rita Mountains in the northeast, and the smaller San Cayetano Mountains, east and adjacent to Nogales's northeast. The sequence of the north-to-south Tumacacori Highlands is as follows:

North-to-south:

1. Tumacacori Mountains
2. Peck Canyon – (Peck Canyon Road)
3. Atascosa Mountains – (6 mi x 9 mi)
4. Ruby Road – (to Ruby, Arizona); Pena Blanca Lake
5. Pajarito Mountains
6. Mexico–Arizona border
7. Sierra La Esmeralda – (the Emerald Mountains)

A Santa Cruz county-border "bootheel" extends southwest; the bootheel contains Cobre Ridge, and it is connected northwest to a small range, the San Luis Mountains which are in the southeast of the Altar Valley, and borders the Buenos Aires National Wildlife Refuge.

Historical mission communities, at Tumacacori National Historical Park, in Tumacacori, Arizona lie at the southeast foothills of the Tumacacori Mountains.
