= Sierra San Antonio =

Mountain range in Sonora, Mexico and Arizona, United States

Coordinates: 31°16′N 110°40′W

Highest point
- Peak: ?
- Elevation: 7,221 ft (2,201 m)

Geography
- Country: Mexico
- State: Sonora

The Sierra San Antonio is a mountain range in the northern part of the Mexican state of Sonora.

== Geography ==
The approximately 10-mile-long (16 km) range is the southern section of the Patagonia Mountains, which lie in Arizona. The range is named after the Roman Catholic Saint Anthony.

The Sierra La Esmeralda, northernmost range of the Sierra Madre Occidental cordillera, begins south of the Sierra San Antonio. Two miles (3.2 km) north of the border and the Sierra San Antonio is Mount Washington, at 7,221 ft (2,201 m) the highest peak of the Patagonia Mountains.

== Regional sky island ecology ==
Various species are studied in the Madrean Sky Islands habitats in higher elevation mountains of northern Sonora and Chihuahua, southeast Arizona, and southwestern New Mexico. One example is research on horned lizards in mountainous areas in northern Mexico in various mountain ranges, including the Sierra San Luis range to the east.

== See also ==
- List of Madrean Sky Island mountain ranges - Sonoran - Chihuahuan Deserts
- Sierra La Esmeralda
- Sierra San Luis
