= Altar Valley =

Valley in southern Arizona

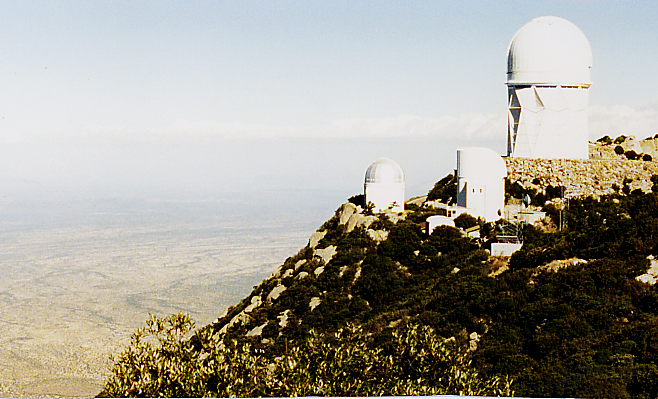
- Typical Sonoran Desert bajada lands (from Kitt Peak, Quinlan Mountains, NW valley)

- Location within Arizona
- Length: 45 mi (72 km)

Geography
- Location: Pima County, Arizona, United States
- Population centers: Robles Junction, AZ-N; Sasabe, AZ-S
- Borders on: Quinlan Mountains-NW; Baboquivari Mountains-SW
- Coordinates: 31.82°N 111.40°W
- Interactive map of Altar Valley

The Altar Valley is a 45-mile (72 km) long north–south valley, trending slightly northeast from Sasabe, Arizona on the Mexico border to the Avra Valley west of the Tucson Mountains. It is delimited by Arizona State Route 86, from east-to-west on the north separating it from the Avra Valley which then trends northwesterly, merging into the plains and drainage of the Santa Cruz River.

The valley is traversed from north to south by Arizona Route 286.

The major Baboquivari sky island range borders the valley on the west; the east is bordered by a series of mountain ranges, that have Nogales, Arizona nestled in between at the United States-Mexico border. Two wilderness areas lie to the west of the valley, the Coyote Mountains Wilderness east of Kitt Peak Observatory, and the Baboquivari Peak Wilderness.

The center of the valley is near Baldy Peak (31.8462°N 111.3351°W) in the southwest Sierrita Mountains. Baldy Peak's height is 4,120 feet (1,256 m).

== Madrean Sky Islands ==
The Madrean Sky Island region of southeast Arizona, extreme southwest New Mexico, northern Sonora and extreme northwest Chihuahua, Mexico, is the region at the northern limits of the western spine mountain of Mexico, the Sierra Madre Occidental-(Mother Mountains, West). The ranges were broken up by Basin and Range faulting, and leaving wide areas of bajadas or graben-type valleys, sometimes with obvious horst-type mountain ranges; even extreme volcanic cones can form on these horst boundaries, like the seven minor volcanoes at the northern end of the Mohawk Mountains

== Buenos Aires National Wildlife Refuge ==
The Buenos Aires National Wildlife Refuge borders the southeast Altar Valley and covers half the valley's length. Sasabe, the U.S.-Mexico border town is surrounded by the refuge, including to the west.

The lower elevation Cerro Colorado range borders the refuge to the northeast, the similar San Luis Mountains to the southeast.

== Table of mountain ranges ==
The mountains to the west and east associated with the Altar Valley.

On maps of Arizona, in the Altar Valley region, the United States-Mexico border changes direction to the northwest to end at the Colorado River at Yuma, Arizona. This change in border direction mostly follows a water divide change, separating drainage basins from each country; there are minor regional exceptions along the border to Yuma and the California border. Southern Arizona's desert waters flow north-northwest mostly ultimately ending at the Gila River which starts in extreme southwestern New Mexico and ends at Yuma, bordering California. Mexico's border drainage is into the Gran Desierto de Altar, with two rivers of northern Sonora draining to the southwest into the northern Gulf of California. These two areas of southwest Arizona and northwest Sorona are most inhospitable and dangerous in summer months. (The Barry M. Goldwater Air Force Range uses the Arizona region because of its remoteness and yeartime usage abilities by flight.)

West Mtns North	Valleys	East Mtns North	East Mtns North
Aguirre Valley	(Marana) (el 1991 ft); Avra Valley	Avra Valley–(Tucson) (& Tucson Mountains)	(Tucson (el 2437 ft))
AZ route 86	AZ route 86 & AZ route 286; Robles Junction, AZ (el 2543 ft)	AZ route 86	AZ route 86
Coyote Mountains, Wilderness, & Kitt Peak	Altar Valley	Sierrita Mountains	xxxxxx
Quinlan Mountains	Altar Valley	Cerro Colorado Mountains; Tumacacori Mountains	xxxxxx (Santa Rita Mountains)
Baboquivari Mountains	Altar Valley	Tumacacori Mountains	Santa Rita Mountains
Baboquivari Mountains	Altar Valley	Tumacacori Mountains	Santa Rita Mountains
Baboquivari Mountains	Altar Valley	Atascosa Mountains	Patagonia Mountains
Baboquivari Mountains	Altar Valley	Pajarito Mountains	Patagonia Mountains
U.S.-Mex-border	Sasabe, Arizona (el 3566 ft)	U.S.-Mex-border	U.S.-Mex-border
xxx-lowlands-xxx	Altar Valley (water divide)	Sierra La Esmeralda	Sierra Madre Occidental (north)
West Mtns South	Valleys	East Mtns South	East Mtns South
