= Coyote Mountains Wilderness =

Coyote Mountains Wilderness may refer to:

- Coyote Mountains Wilderness (Arizona)
- Coyote Mountains Wilderness (California)
