= Cerro Colorado Mountains =

Landform in Pima County, Arizona

- Location within Arizona

Highest point
- Peak: Colorado Peak
- Elevation: 5,319 ft (1,621 m)
- Coordinates: 31°42′44″N 111°15′43″W

Dimensions
- Length: 6.8 km (4.2 mi) NNW
- Width: 4.0 km (2.5 mi) NNE
- Area: 21 km^{2} (8.1 mi^{2})

Geography
- Country: United States
- State: Arizona
- Region: Sonoran Desert
- County: Pima County
- Borders on: Sierrita Mountains and Las Guijas Mountains

The Cerro Colorado Mountains are a low mountain range in southern Pima County, Arizona, USA. The highest point of the range is Colorado Peak (5,319 feet (1,621 m)). The range consists of a NNW–SSE trending ridge with several shorter ridges extending off the main ridge to the ENE. The higher portions of the range cover an area of about 21 km^{2} (8.1 mi^{2}), with dimensions of 6.8 km (4.2 mi) by 4.0 km (2.5 mi).

The foothills of the Sierrita Mountains lie about 7 mi (11 km) to the north with the Batamote Hills and Penitas Hills between to the north and northwest respectively. The Las Guijas Mountains lie 12 km (7.5 mi) to the southwest. The Sierra Colorado silver mining district lies in the hills between the Sierra Colorados and the Las Guijas ranges. Saucito Mountain at the north end of the Tumacacori Mountains of Santa Cruz County is about 11 km (6.8 mi) southeast. Arivaca Junction in the Santa Cruz River valley lies 17.5 km (10.9 mi) due east. The Santa Rita Mountains are across the Santa Cruz Valley to the east. The broad Altar Valley lies 15 km (9.3 mi) to the west with the Baboquivari Mountains beyond.

Arivaca Road, which connects Arivaca Junction on the east with Arivaca to the southwest at the south end of the Las Guijas Mountains, runs through the valley on the southeast of the Cerro Colorados.

== Cerro Colorado mine ==
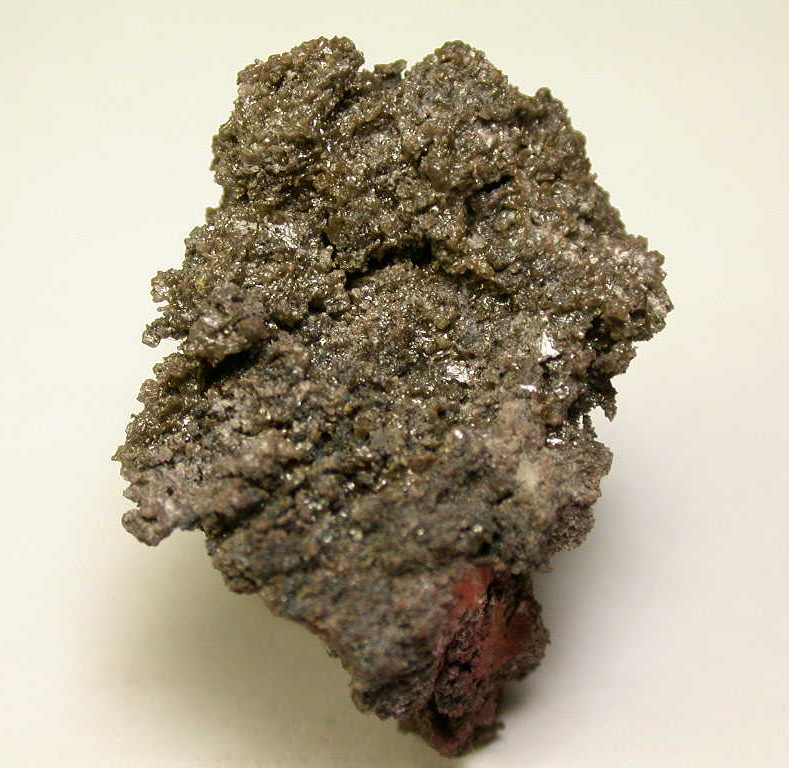
Chlorargyrite (silver chloride) from the Cerro Colorado mine. Old specimen.

The Cerro Colorado mine (Heintzelman Mine; Silver Queen Mine) was discovered around 1750 by Spanish explorers. The mine was in production from 1856 to 1884 and from 1901 to 1937. Early production was by the Sonora Exploration & Mining Company, which was then owned by Charles Poston and Samuel Colt. Production was some 3,000 tons of ore which averaged about 100 ounces of silver per ton, 0.1 ounces of gold per ton and minor amounts of lead and copper.

The highest grade ore on record was over 12,000 ounces of silver per ton, with an average mined grade in 1859 of 770 oz/t; the average since that year is around 225 oz/t. Ore was mined above 350 feet of depth.
