= Tumacacori Mountains =

Landform in Santa Cruz and Pima counties in Arizona

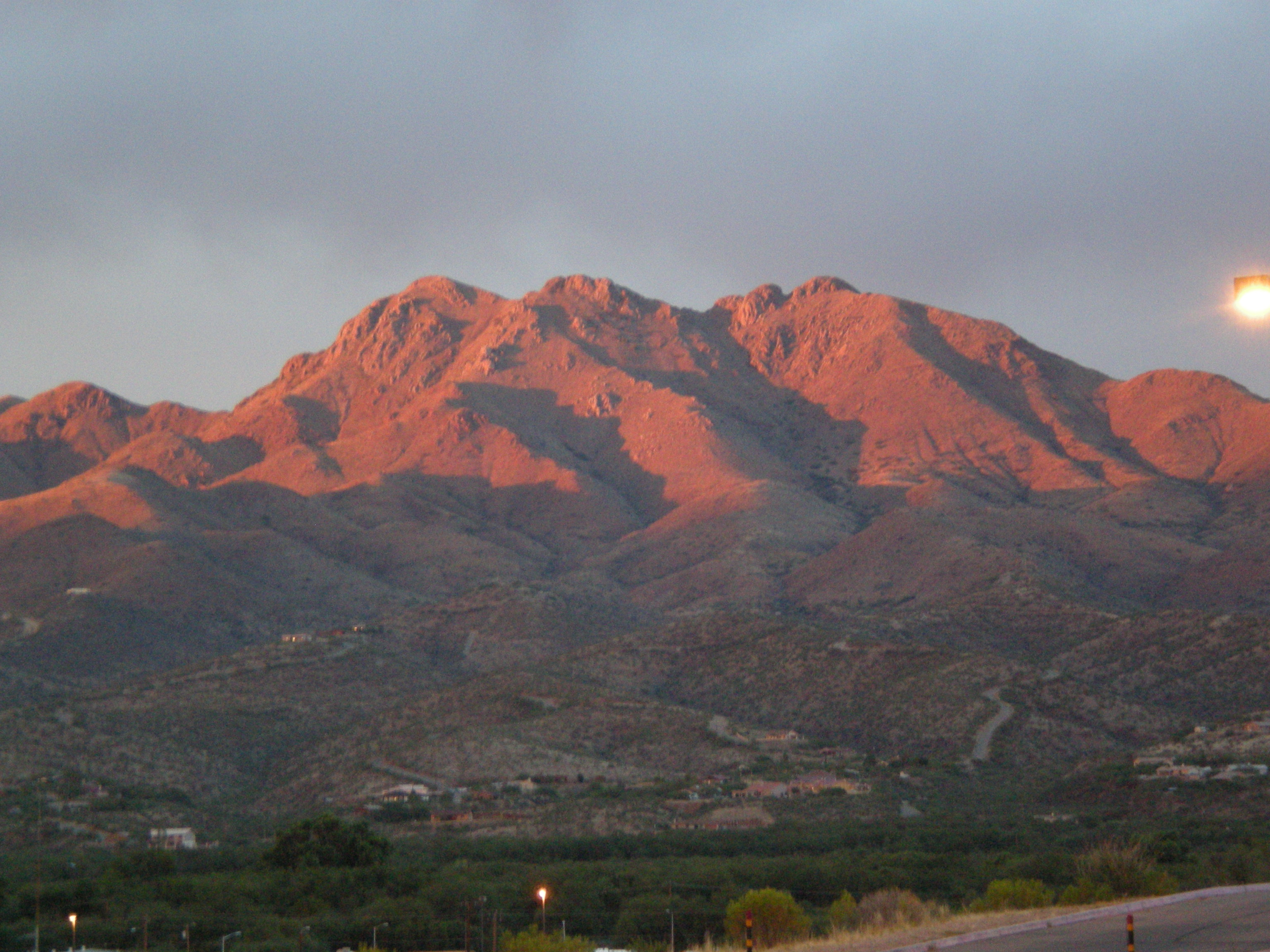
- Sunset on the Tumacacori Mountains, June 2008

Highest point
- Peak: Unnamed peak
- Elevation: 5,111 ft (1,558 m)
- Coordinates: 31°33′04″N 111°06′30″W

Geography
- Location within Arizona Location within the United States
- Country: United States
- State: Arizona
- Region(s): Sonoran Desert (N & NE)

The Tumacacori Mountains is a mountain range in Santa Cruz and Pima counties in southern Arizona, United States. The highest peak in the range is an unnamed summit with an elevation of 5,736 feet (1,748 m).

== Tumacacori Highlands ==
The Tumacacori Highlands is a series of connected mountain ranges in western Santa Cruz County. The Highlands are northwest of Nogales and are bordered on the east by the Santa Cruz River Valley, that is traversed north–south by Interstate 19. Across the valley eastwards are the tall Santa Rita Mountains in the northeast, and the smaller San Cayetano Mountains, east and adjacent to Nogales's northeast. The sequence of the north-to-south Tumacacori Highlands is as follows:

North to south:

1. Tumacacori Mountains
2. Peck Canyon – (Peck Canyon Road)
3. Atascosa Mountains – (6 mi × 9 mi)
4. Ruby Road – (to Ruby, Arizona); Pena Blanca Lake
5. Pajarito Mountains
6. Mexico-Arizona border
7. Sierra La Esmeralda – (the Emerald Mountains)

A Santa Cruz county-border "bootheel" extends southwest; the bootheel contains Cobre Ridge, and it is connected northwest to a small range, the San Luis Mountains which are in the southeast of the Altar Valley, and borders the Buenos Aires National Wildlife Refuge.

Historical mission communities, at Tumacacori National Historical Park, in Tumacacori, lie at the southeast foothills of the Tumacacori Mountains.

== See also ==
- List of mountain ranges of Arizona
