= Pajarita Wilderness =

Protected area in Santa Cruz County, Arizona

- IUCN category Ib (wilderness area)
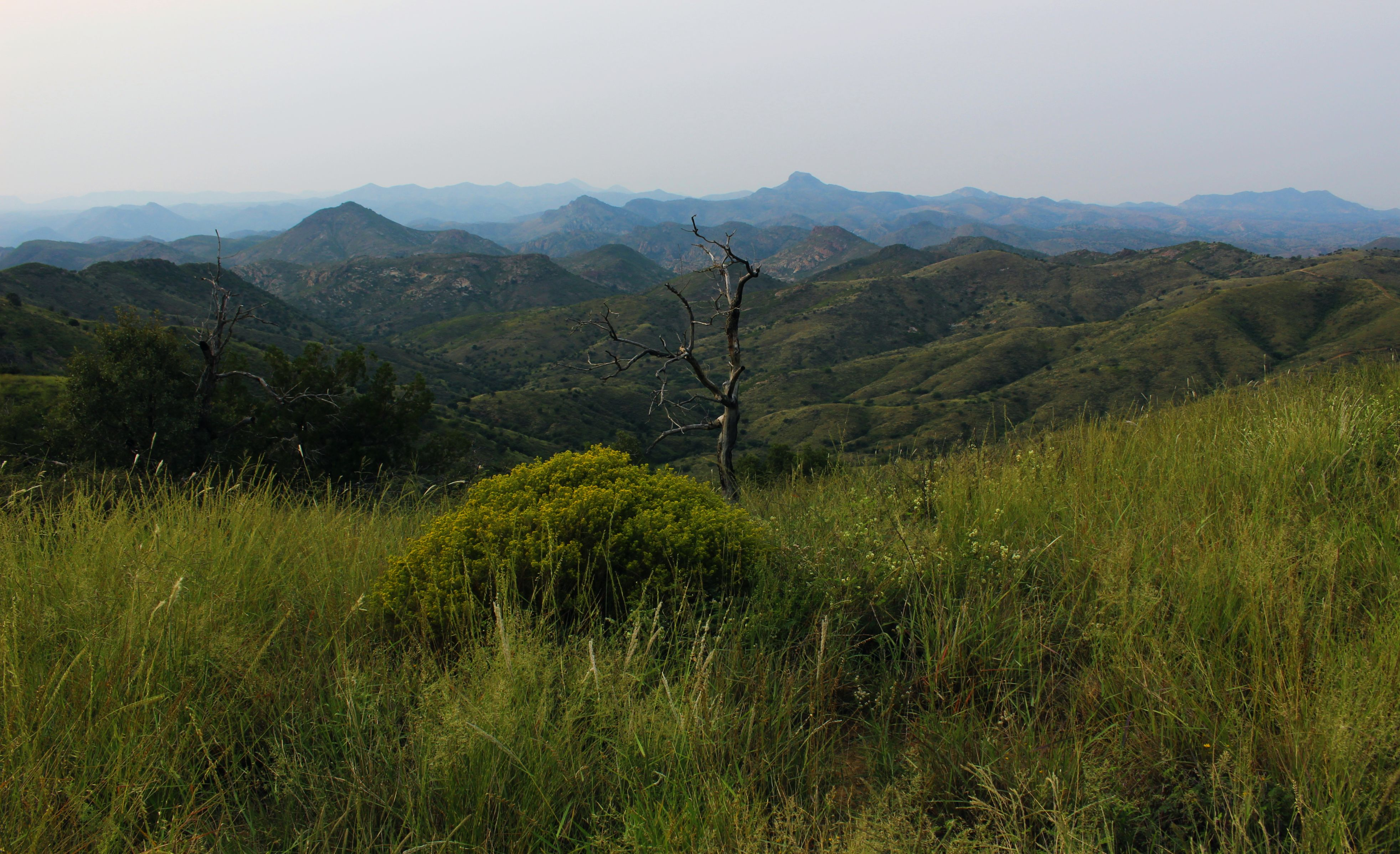
- Looking west over the Pajarita Wilderness and surrounding mountains on both sides of the U.S.-Mexican border

- Location within the United States
- Location: Santa Cruz County, Arizona, United States
- Nearest city: Nogales, AZ
- Coordinates: 31°23′35″N 111°12′25″W
- Area: 7,499 acres (30 km^{2})
- Established: 1984
- Governing body: U.S. Forest Service

Pajarita Wilderness is a protected wilderness area managed by the Coronado National Forest in the U.S. state of Arizona. Established in 1984 under the Arizona Wilderness Act, the array of canyons that make up the area sit at the western end of the Pajarito Mountains, and form a well-known migration route for birds. Sycamore Canyon is the centerpiece of the wilderness, a riparian forest that supports more than 160 bird species.

Elevation ranges from 3,800 to 4,800 feet (1,200 to 1,500 m), and the area provides excellent habitat for more than 660 species of plants. The Sycamore Canyon trail is a popular hiking destination very close to the international border between Mexico and the United States.

== Current Wilderness Threats ==
As of September 2020, construction of the U.S. government's border wall system and accompanying supply roads (and groundwater pumping) by contractors working for Customs and Border Protection are threatening the wilderness area. Scientists and environmentalists have voiced concerns about the border wall system's impact on ocelot, mountain lion, black bear, and jaguar wildlife corridors protected within the Pajarita Wilderness and nearby areas of Southern Arizona where the project is planned.

== See also ==
- List of Arizona Wilderness Areas
- List of U.S. Wilderness Areas
