= Carmen, Arizona =

- Populated place
- Location within the state of Arizona Carmen (the United States)
- Coordinates: 31°35′14″N 111°03′10″W
- Country: United States
- State: Arizona
- County: Santa Cruz
- Elevation: 3,271 ft (997 m)
- Time zone: UTC-7 (Mountain (MST))
  - Summer (DST): UTC-7 (MST)
- Area code: 520
- FIPS code: 04-10250
- GNIS feature ID: 27290

Carmen is a populated place situated in Santa Cruz County, Arizona, United States. Carmen is part of the Tumacacori-Carmen census-designated place. It has an estimated elevation of 3,271 feet (997 m) above sea level.

== History ==
Carmen's population was 60 in the 1960 census.
