= Sierra del Tigre =

Mountain range in Sonora, Mexico

- Sierra el Tigre

Highest point
- Elevation: 2,359.8 m (7,742 ft)

Dimensions
- Length: 19 mi (31 km) N-S
- Width: 13 mi (21 km) E-W

Geography
- Country: Mexico
- State: Sonora
- Region: Sonoran Desert
- Municipalities: Agua Prieta and Douglas, Arizona
- Range coordinates: 30°35′22″N 109°11′14″W
- Borders on: Sierra San Luis, Yaqui River and Rio Bavispe

Sierra del Tigre is a mountain range in northeastern Sonora, Mexico at the northern region of the Sierra Madre Occidental. The region contains sky island mountain ranges, called the Madrean Sky Islands, some separated from the Sierra Madre Occidental proper, and occurring in the northeastern Sonoran Desert, and extreme west-northwestern Chihuahuan Desert. Many of the ranges occur in southeast Arizona.

The Sierra del Tigre mountain range lies south of the San Bernardino Valley (Arizona) south of the Chiricahua Mountains; also the Swisshelm, Pedrogosa, and Perilla Mountains. The range is southeast of Douglas, Arizona-Agua Prieta, Sonora.

== Ecology ==
Sierra del Tigre is located in the subregion of the Sonoran Desert called the Plains of Sonora along with some example mountain ranges, Sierra Mazatan, Sierra San Javier, and Cananea San Pedro. The threats include urbanization, land clearing, etc. The riparian protected wetland and grassland to the north in the San Bernardino Valley is the San Bernardino National Wildlife Refuge; Leslie Canyon National Wildlife Refuge is also nearby.

== People ==
Home to the Janeros local group of the Nednhi-Chiricahua Apache, who were led by feared Juh in the 1870s, the Sierra El Tigre was one of the last strongholds for fighting Apaches against Mexican and U.S. forces in search of Apache war parties into the 1930s.

== See also ==
- Sierra San Luis
