= Patagonia Mountains =

Landform in Santa Cruz County, Arizona, US and Sonora, Mexico

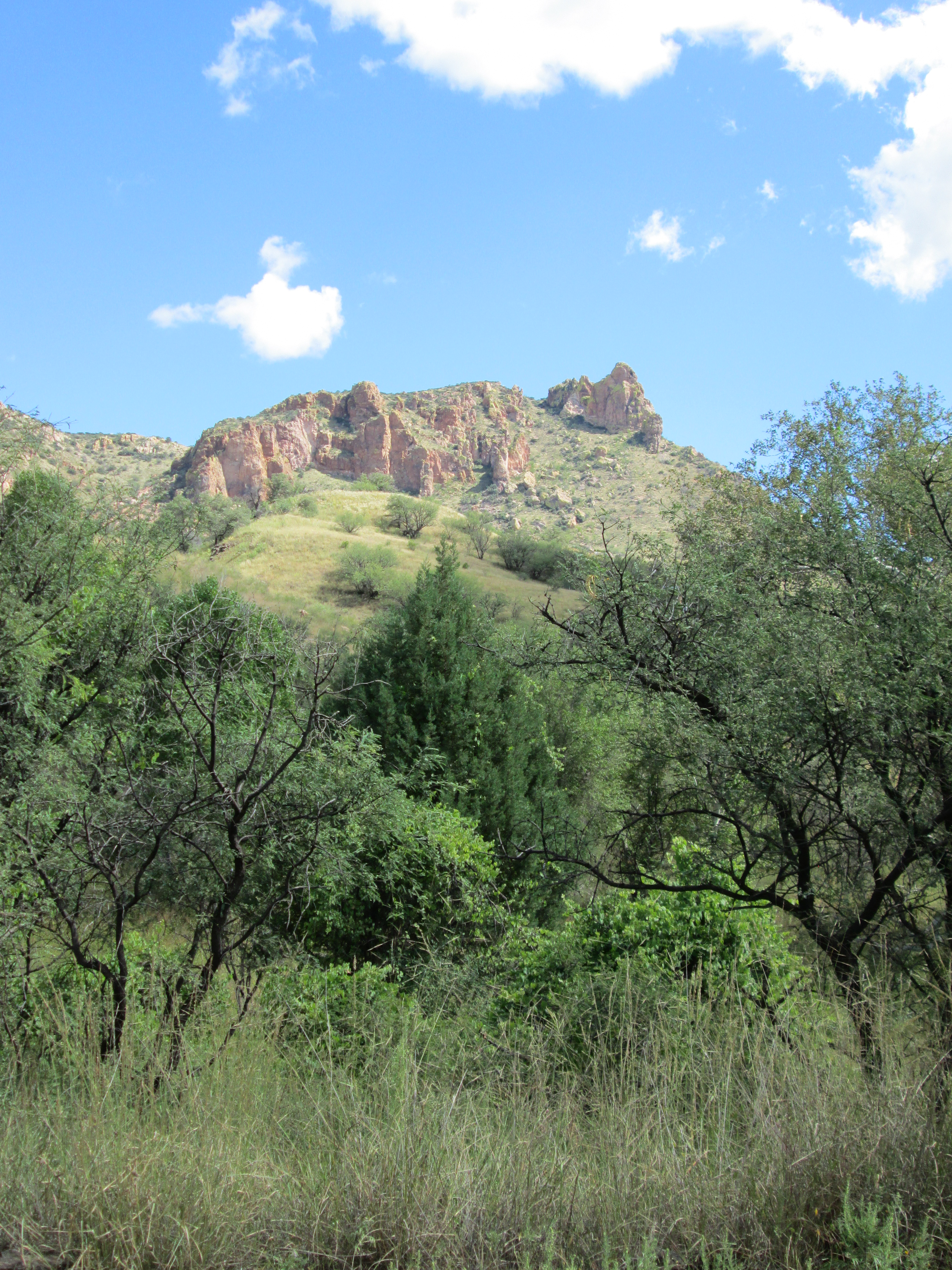
- The Patagonia Mountains, north of Harshaw

Highest point
- Peak: Mount Washington
- Elevation: 7,221 ft (2,201 m)
- Coordinates: 31°21′12″N 110°43′31″W

Geography
- Country: United States
- State: Arizona
- Range coordinates: 31°25′50″N 110°45′32″W

The Patagonia Mountains are a 15-mile-long (24 km) mountain range within the Coronado National Forest, and in Santa Cruz County, Arizona, United States.

== Geography ==
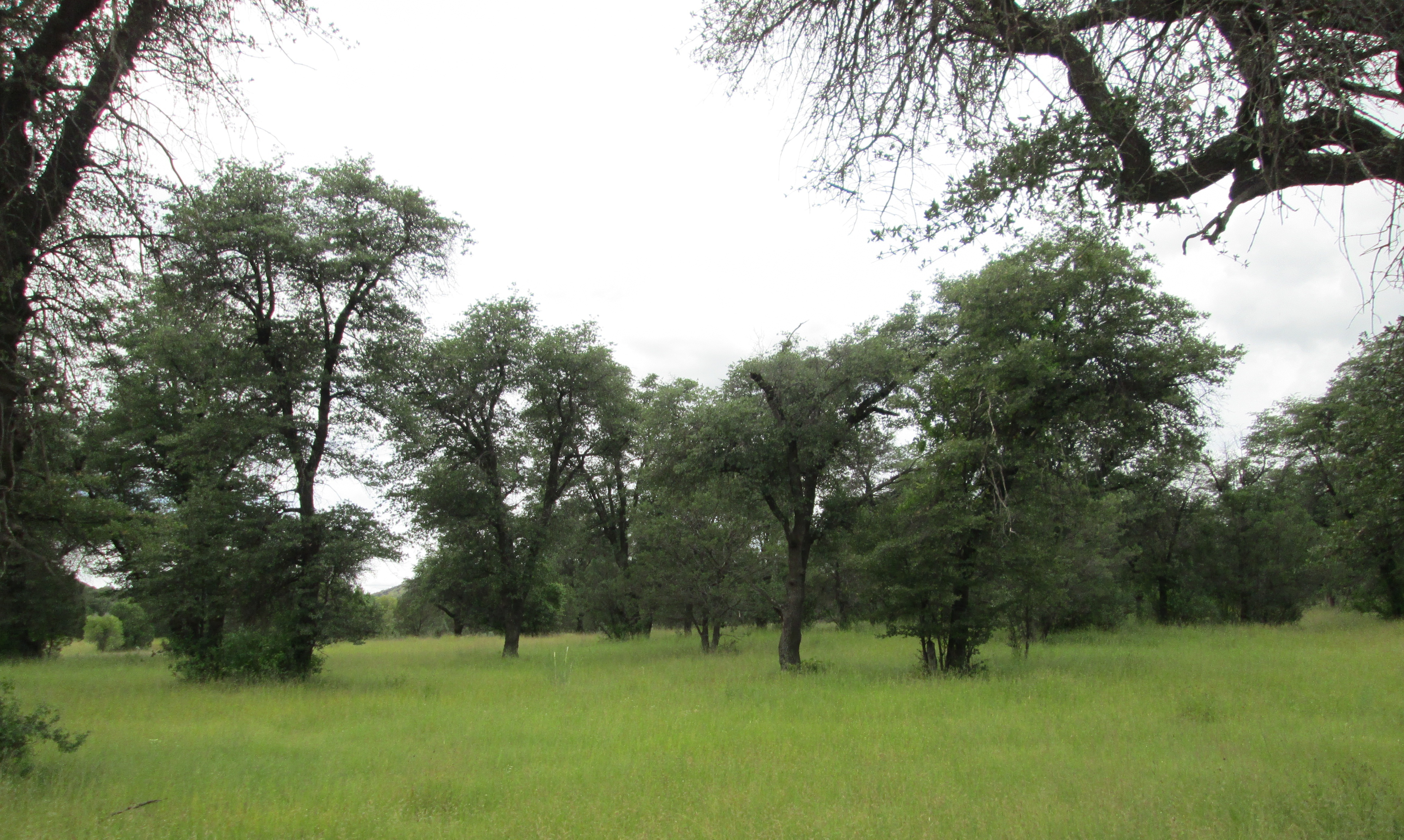
Oak woodland in the Patagonia Mountains.

The Patagonia Mountains begin near the Mexico border east of Nogales, Arizona. Running north, they are geologically related to the Santa Rita Mountains, which continue north beyond Sonoita Creek. The Santa Rita Mountains line up to the north across the Sonoita Valley. Both the Patagonias and the Santa Ritas are east of the Santa Cruz River Valley. Arizona State Route 82 winds through the Sonoita Valley along Sonoita Creek which flows between the Santa Ritas and the Patagonias. Patagonia Lake and the town of Patagonia are located in the Sonoita Valley. Some of the important peaks are, Mount Washington, the highest peak at 7,221 feet (2,195 m), Veteran's Peak, 7,211 feet (2,192 m), and Guajalote Peak, 6,490 feet (1,973 m). North of Guajalote Peak lies Soldier Basin. Above and to the east of the basin lies the largest endemic stand of ponderosa and Chihuahua pines in the range.

The Sierra San Antonio are a continuation of the Patagonia Mountains southwards into Mexico, a mountain range of about 10 miles (16 km) in length that tapers down to lower elevations where the Santa Cruz River makes its bend near the Sonoran town of San Lázaro.

The old mining camps and ghost towns of Mowry, Washington Camp, Harshaw, and Duquesne are located in the Patagonia Mountains.

Nogales, Arizona, and Nogales, Sonora, are in the valley to the southwest of the mountain range. The San Rafael Valley and Canelo Hills are to the east of the Patagonia Mountains.

== Ecology ==
The connected Santa Rita, Patagonia, and Sierra San Antonio ranges are part of the Madrean Sky Islands ecoregion, the sky island mountain ranges region on the north of the Sierra Madre Occidental, the major cordillera and mountain ecoregion of central-western and northwestern Mexico.

== See also ==
- List of mountain ranges of Arizona
- List of Madrean Sky Island mountain ranges – Sonoran – Chihuahuan Deserts
