= Avra Valley, Arizona =

CDP in Pima County, Arizona

- CDP
- Location in Pima County and the state of Arizona
- Coordinates: 32°25′7″N 111°19′41″W
- Country: United States
- State: Arizona
- County: Pima

Area
  - Total: 22.37 sq mi (57.95 km^{2})
  - Land: 22.37 sq mi (57.95 km^{2})
  - Water: 0 sq mi (0.00 km^{2})
- Elevation: 1,919 ft (585 m)

Population (2020)
  - Total: 5,569
  - Density: 249/sq mi (96.1/km^{2})
- Time zone: UTC-7 (MST (no daylight saving time))
- ZIP code: 85653
- Area code: 520
- FIPS code: 04-04880
- GNIS feature ID: 1866979

Avra Valley (O'odham: Ko:jĭ Pi Bak) is a census-designated place (CDP) in Pima County, Arizona, United States. The population was 5,569 at the 2020 census, down from 6,050 at the 2010 census; it was 5,038 in 2000.

== Geography ==
Avra Valley is located at 32°25′7″N 111°19′41″W (32.418704, -111.328028).

According to the United States Census Bureau, the CDP has a total area of 22.1 square miles (57.2 km^{2}), all land.

=== Climate ===
Avra Valley has a hot desert climate (Köppen climate classification: BWh).

Climate data for Avra Valley, Arizona
Month	Jan	Feb	Mar	Apr	May	Jun	Jul	Aug	Sep	Oct	Nov	Dec	Year
Record high °F (°C)	87 (31)	90 (32)	97 (36)	104 (40)	108 (42)	115 (46)	114 (46)	113 (45)	109 (43)	106 (41)	95 (35)	88 (31)	115 (46)
Mean daily maximum °F (°C)	66 (19)	69 (21)	75 (24)	83 (28)	92 (33)	101 (38)	101 (38)	99 (37)	96 (36)	86 (30)	75 (24)	66 (19)	84 (29)
Daily mean °F (°C)	53 (12)	56 (13)	61 (16)	68 (20)	77 (25)	85 (29)	88 (31)	86 (30)	82 (28)	72 (22)	61 (16)	53 (12)	70 (21)
Mean daily minimum °F (°C)	39 (4)	42 (6)	46 (8)	53 (12)	61 (16)	69 (21)	74 (23)	72 (22)	68 (20)	57 (14)	46 (8)	39 (4)	56 (13)
Record low °F (°C)	15 (−9)	19 (−7)	26 (−3)	27 (−3)	42 (6)	51 (11)	51 (11)	46 (8)	46 (8)	35 (2)	26 (−3)	21 (−6)	15 (−9)

== Demographics ==
Historical population
Census	Pop.	Note	%±
1990	3,403		—
2000	5,038		48.0%
2010	6,050		20.1%
2020	5,569		−8.0%
U.S. Decennial Census

Avra Valley first appeared on the 1990 U.S. Census as a census-designated place (CDP).

=== 2020 census ===
As of the 2020 census, Avra Valley had a population of 5,569. The median age was 45.2 years. 20.6% of residents were under the age of 18 and 20.1% of residents were 65 years of age or older. For every 100 females there were 104.9 males, and for every 100 females age 18 and over there were 104.7 males age 18 and over.

0.0% of residents lived in urban areas, while 100.0% lived in rural areas.

There were 2,103 households in Avra Valley, of which 28.0% had children under the age of 18 living in them. Of all households, 45.8% were married-couple households, 21.7% were households with a male householder and no spouse or partner present, and 22.6% were households with a female householder and no spouse or partner present. About 23.5% of all households were made up of individuals and 10.7% had someone living alone who was 65 years of age or older.

There were 2,362 housing units, of which 11.0% were vacant. The homeowner vacancy rate was 2.3% and the rental vacancy rate was 11.8%.

Racial composition as of the 2020 census
Race	Number	Percent
White	4,329	77.7%
Black or African American	82	1.5%
American Indian and Alaska Native	95	1.7%
Asian	21	0.4%
Native Hawaiian and Other Pacific Islander	1	0.0%
Some other race	345	6.2%
Two or more races	696	12.5%
Hispanic or Latino (of any race)	1,162	20.9%

=== 2000 census ===
At the 2000 census there were 5,038 people, 1,714 households, and 1,311 families living in the CDP. The population density was 228.3 inhabitants per square mile (88.1/km^{2}). There were 1,895 housing units at an average density of 85.9 per square mile (33.2/km^{2}). The racial makeup of the CDP was 84.0% White, 1.8% Black or African American, 1.7% Native American, 0.4% Asian, <0.1% Pacific Islander, 9.7% from other races, and 2.4% from two or more races. 20.7% of the population were Hispanic or Latino of any race. Of the 1,714 households 38.0% had children under the age of 18 living with them, 58.0% were married couples living together, 12.0% had a female householder with no husband present, and 23.5% were non-families. 17.8% of households were one person and 5.7% were one person aged 65 or older. The average household size was 2.94 and the average family size was 3.30.

The age distribution was 31.5% under the age of 18, 7.6% from 18 to 24, 29.3% from 25 to 44, 22.5% from 45 to 64, and 9.2% 65 or older. The median age was 34 years. For every 100 females, there were 104.9 males. For every 100 females age 18 and over, there were 102.3 males.

The median household income was $35,459 and the median family income was $36,981. Males had a median income of $30,643 versus $20,110 for females. The per capita income for the CDP was $13,175. About 9.0% of families and 11.5% of the population were below the poverty line, including 12.8% of those under age 18 and 5.6% of those age 65 or over.

== Education ==
It is in the Marana Unified School District.

== History of Farming and Agriculture ==
Agriculture in Avra Valley and Marana has been around for decades. The Anway family arrived in 1919 and started to amass farmland and livestock. Later there was a family with the last name of 'Manville' who also settled in and started farming. Both Anway and Manville later became the names of the main roads in Avra Valley.

Two main present day farms in Avra Valley are:

Burruel and Burruel is a local farm in Avra Valley.

Bayer greenhouse is a Bayer facility where the company is testing ways "to help corn better adapt to various climate conditions around the world".

== Airport ==
The Marana Regional Airport is located at 11700 W Avra Valley Rd, Marana, AZ 85653. It houses more than 260 based aircraft and is considered an aviation reliever airport for Tucson International.
