= Sierrita Mountains =

Landform in Pima County, Arizona

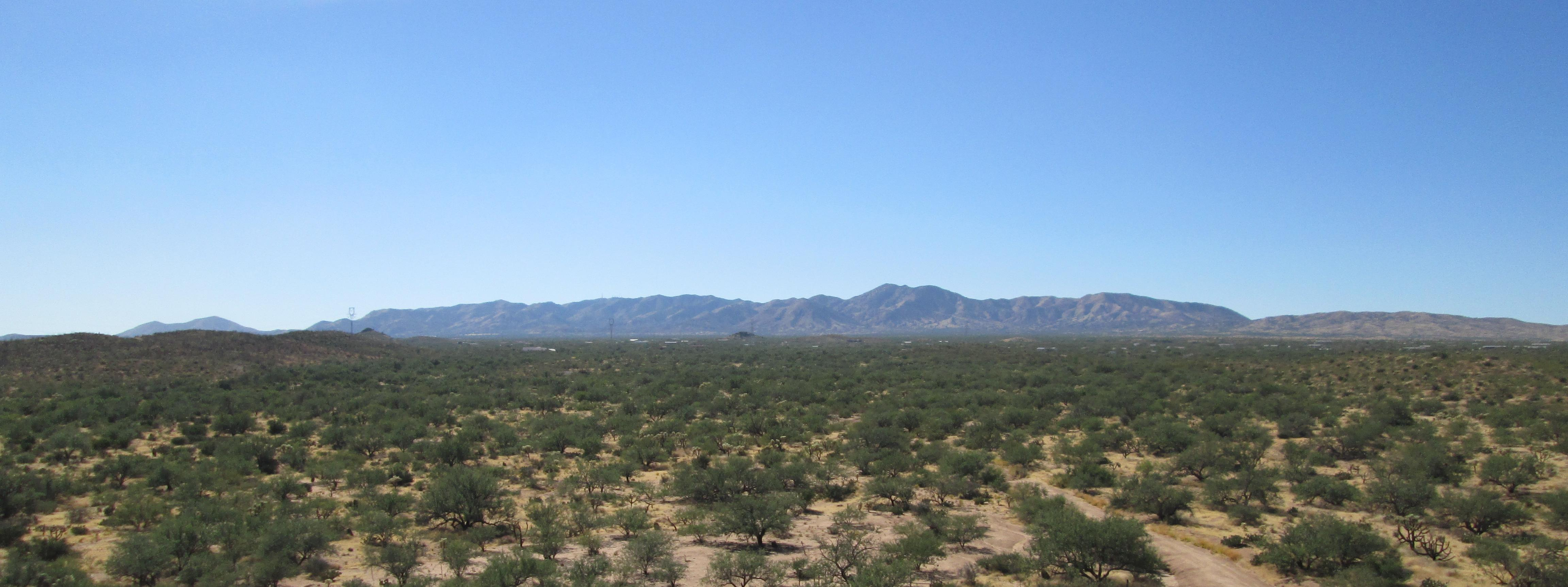
- The Sierritas from the east.

Highest point
- Peak: Keystone Peak
- Elevation: 6,188 ft (1,886 m)
- Coordinates: 31°52′40″N 111°11′42″W

Geography
- Location within Arizona
- Location: Pima County, Arizona
- Country: United States
- State: Arizona
- Region: Sonoran Desert
- District: Tucson, AZ
- Topo map(s): USGS Samaniego, AZ

The Sierrita Mountains (English: "Little Mountains") is a minor mountain range about 40 mi (60 km) southwest of Tucson, in Pima County, Arizona. Historically, the area has seen extensive mining and ranching activity: several ranches, abandoned mines, and the large Sierrita Mine are located in the area. The highest point in the mountains is Keystone Peak, which rises to 6,188 feet (1,886 m).

The Santa Cruz Valley bounds the range to the east separating it from the Santa Rita Mountains. The west margin of the range is the broad Altar Valley. To the southwest the Sierritas merge with the Cerro Colorado Mountains and the Penitas Hills. The Tumacacori Mountains of Santa Cruz County lie to the southeast.

== Gallery ==
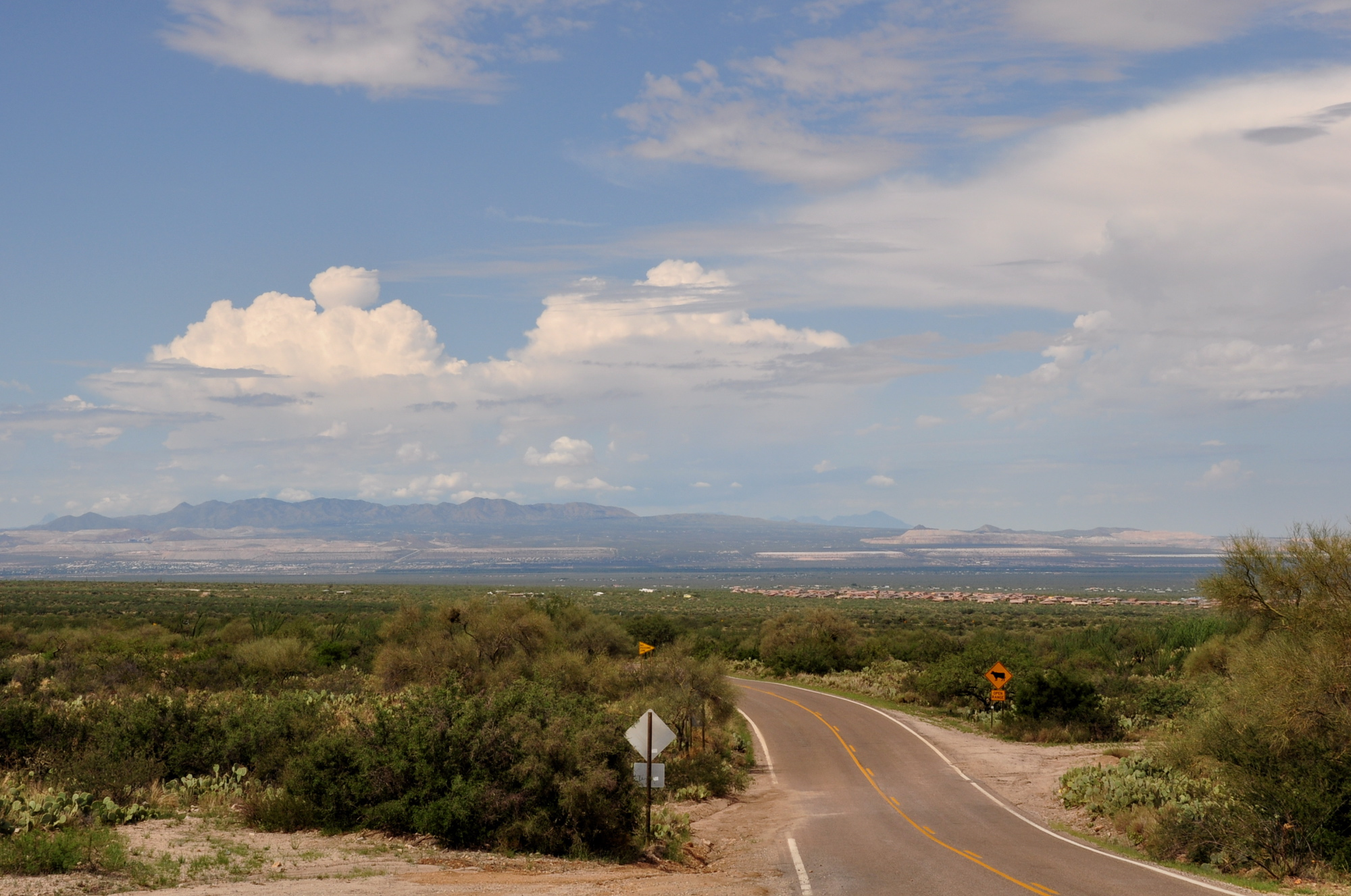
The Sierritas from Corona de Tucson.

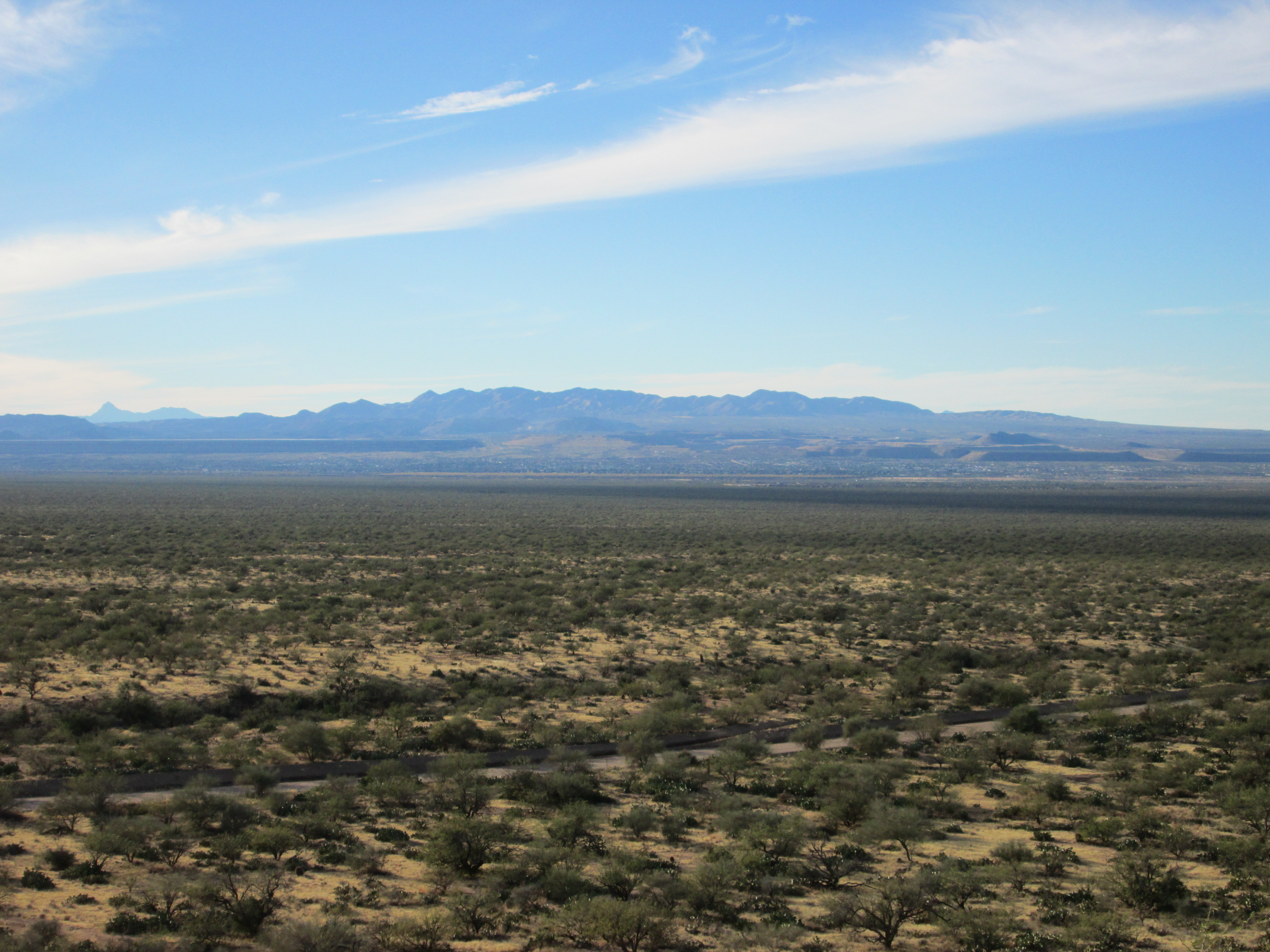
View of the Sierritas from the Santa Rita Experimental Range.

== See also ==
- Copper mining in Arizona
