= Coyote Mountains Wilderness (Arizona) =

Protected area in Pima County, Arizona

- IUCN category Ib (wilderness area)
- Location within Arizona
- Location: Robles Junction, AZ, Pima County, Arizona, Sonoran Desert, Arizona, United States
- Coordinates: 31.9898°N 111.5207°W
- Area: 20.6 km^{2} (8.0 sq mi)
- Established: 1990s

The 5,080-acre (20.6 km^{2}) Coyote Mountains Wilderness of Arizona is part of the Coyote Mountains of southern Arizona in the center of Pima County. The wilderness lies about 40 mi southwest of Tucson, in the northwest of the Altar Valley. Kitt Peak is 4 mi WSW.

== Description ==
The Coyote Mountains Wilderness makes up much of the center and northeast of the Coyote Mountains. The Coyote's are separated from the Quinlin Mountains abutting southwest; both ranges anchor the northern end of the north–south, massif of the Baboquivari Mountains. The three ranges are located at the northwest of the Altar Valley.

The Coyote Mountains are a small range only about 7 mi long, and merge into lower elevation hills. The north of the wilderness and mountains descend quickly into the south of the Aguirre Valley. The northeast, east, and southeast of the wilderness and the Coyote Mountains descend quickly into the Altar Valley.

== Kitt Peak ==
Kitt Peak and surrounding peaks form a separate landform between the Quinlin Mountains and the Coyotes. The Quinlins are a linear range, northwest by southeast. From Kitt Peak and northeastwards, the mountains and hills separate into individual units. The Coyote Mountains Wilderness is the largest, and tallest unit in the northeast of the small Coyote Mountains range, which is only about 7 mi long.

== Flora and fauna ==
Some of the common flora in the Coyote Mountains and wilderness are the paloverde tree, and the saguaro cactus. Some oak woodlands are present.

== See also ==
- List of U.S. Wilderness Areas
- List of Arizona Wilderness Areas
- Wilderness Act
