= Arivaca Lake =

Waterbody in Pima County, Arizona

- Location within Arizona
- Location: Pima County, Arizona, United States
- Coordinates: 31°31′25″N 111°15′15″W
- Type: reservoir
- Basin countries: United States
- Surface area: 90 acres (36 ha)
- Average depth: 28 ft (8.5 m)
- Surface elevation: 3,750 ft (1,140 m)
- Settlements: Arivaca

Arivaca Lake is located in southern Arizona, 60 miles (97 km) south of Tucson near Arivaca, Arizona. The facilities are maintained by the Arizona Game and Fish Department.

== History ==
Arivaca Lake was initially created in 1947 by Phil Clarke when he built a earthen dam on his ranch property. It was built as a source of water for his livestock and to irrigate his farm. He stocked it with gamefish and the private lake was known as Clarke Lake. In 1965, extremely heavy winter rains washed the dam out. In 1969, the Arizona Game and Fish Department purchased the land to develop as a recreation lake. The dam was completed in July of 1970 and by April of 1971 was half full, stocked with fish, and open to the public. That October, however, the lake suffered a near total fish kill caused by oxygen depletion from an algae bloom.

In mid-1999, there was a total fish kill due to oxygen depletion. Before this event, the lake was known for consistently producing largemouth bass over 10 pounds.

== Fish species ==
- Largemouth Bass
- Sunfish
- Channel Catfish
