= Sierra San Luis =

Mountain range in North America

Dimensions
- Length: 20 mi (32 km) (N-S)
- Width: 15 mi (24 km) E-W

Geography
- Country: Mexico
- States: Sonora and Chihuahua
- Regions: Sonoran Desert and Chihuahuan Desert
- Municipalities: Agua Prieta and Douglas, Arizona
- Range coordinates: 31°8′N 108°56′W
- Borders on: Sierra del Tigre, U.S.-Mexico border and Peloncillo Mountains

The Sierra San Luis range is a mountain range in northwest Chihuahua, northeast Sonora, Mexico at the northern region of the Sierra Madre Occidental cordillera. The region contains sky island mountain ranges, called the Madrean Sky Islands, some separated from the Sierra Madre Occidental proper, and occurring in the northeastern Sonoran Desert, and extreme west-northwestern Chihuahuan Desert. Many of the ranges occur in southeast Arizona.

Most of Sierra San Luis is privately owned land. The mountain range and the range to the north, the Peloncillo Mountains of Hidalgo County, New Mexico, can be viewed from the west at the Leslie Canyon National Wildlife Refuge and the San Bernardino National Wildlife Refuge.

The Rio Bavispe borders the southeast of Sierra San Luis and flows northwest around the Sierra del Tigre range.

== Fauna and flora ==
Sky islands often lead to geographic isolation; (the tepuis of north-northeastern South America). The Madrean Sky Islands are being studied for mammal movements, the cats especially, bobcats, mountain lions, etc.

An example study is for snakes, the Animas ridge-nosed rattlesnake, Crotalus willardi obscurus. It is being studied in 3 sky island ranges: Animas Mountains, the Peloncillos, and Sierra San Luis.

North American beavers once flourished in the area, but their numbers have dwindled in the past few years and have become more rare in the area.

== See also ==
- Sierra del Tigre
