= Robles Junction, Arizona =

Neighborhood of Three Points, Pima County, Arizona, United States

- neighborhood
- Location within Arizona Location within the United States
- Coordinates: 32°04′38″N 111°18′42″W
- Country: United States
- State: Arizona
- County: Pima
- Elevation: 2,543 ft (775 m)
- Time zone: UTC-7 (Mountain (MST))
- Area code: 520
- GNIS feature ID: 24585

Robles Junction is a neighborhood of Three Points in Pima County, Arizona, United States. Robles Junction is located at the intersection of Arizona State Route 86 and Arizona State Route 286 southwest of Tucson.

Route 286 traverses the center of the north-northeast-trending Altar Valley; Sasabe is at the southern terminus, and Robles Junction is at the northern. The Altar Valley merges into the Avra Valley northeast of Robles Junction.

== History ==
Three Points, also known as Robles Junction, was founded in 1882. Bernabe S. Robles, who was born in 1857, in Baviácora, Sonora, Mexico, came to Tucson in 1864, and grew up there. After spending sometime in Florence, Arizona he returned to Tucson and accepted a mail route to Gunsight, Arizona, near Ajo. It was during this time he located what is now called Robles Pass, near Cat (Back) Mountain, while searching for a shorter route to Gunsight. In 1882, he had his brother Jesus, homestead 160 acres, at what is now Robles Junction/Three Points, and dug a well to set up a watering stop and stage station, so Bernabe could water his horses along his mail route. He eventually gave up his mail route, and moved to the former watering stop/stage station, which at that point was called the Robles Ranch. He and his family ran the ranch for many years, even after the family had moved back to Tucson. Robles died in 1945. The old ranch house is now the Three Points/Robles Junction Community Center.
