= Tumacacori, Arizona =

Historic community in Santa Cruz County, Arizona

Tumacacori-Carmen, Arizona
- Census-designated place
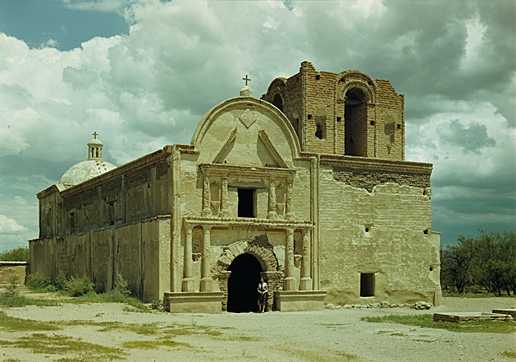
- Tumacacori mission, 1947. Photo: George A. Grant

- Location in Santa Cruz County and the state of Arizona

- Location within Arizona Location within the United States
- Coordinates: 31°33′40″N 111°2′52″W
- Country: United States
- State: Arizona
- County: Santa Cruz

Area
  - Total: 1.92 sq mi (4.96 km^{2})
  - Land: 1.91 sq mi (4.95 km^{2})
  - Water: 0 sq mi (0.00 km^{2})

Population (2020)
  - Total: 329
  - Density: 172.1/sq mi (66.44/km^{2})
- Time zone: UTC-7 (MST (no DST))
- ZIP code: 85640
- Area code: 520
- FIPS code: 04-77367

Tumacacori (/ˌtuːməˈkɑːkəri/) is an unincorporated community in Santa Cruz County, Arizona, United States, which abuts the community of Carmen. Together, the communities constitute the Tumacacori-Carmen census-designated place (CDP). The population of the CDP was 393 at the 2010 census.

== History ==
Tumacacori is the site of Mission San José de Tumacácori, a Franciscan mission that was built in the late 18th century. It takes its name from an earlier mission site founded by Father Eusebio Kino in 1691, which is on the east side of the Santa Cruz River, south of the national park. This Kino-period mission was founded at an extant native O'odham or Sobaipuri settlement and represents the first mission in southern Arizona, but not the first mission in Arizona. The remains of the native settlement are still extant and have been investigated and reported on by archaeologist Deni Seymour.

The later Franciscan mission, which is now a ruin preserved as Tumacácori National Historical Park, was never rebuilt after being abandoned after repeated Apache raids in the 19th century that killed farmers and ranchers in the area and put a stop to the growth of the area's economy. Nearby Tubac was besieged in 1861.

== Geography ==
According to the United States Census Bureau, the Tumacacori-Carmen CDP has a total area of 2.0 square miles (5.1 km^{2}), all land. The locale is in a valley cut by the Santa Cruz River.

=== Climate ===
Tumacacori has a semi-arid climate (Köppen: BSk) with cool winters and hot summers.

Climate data for Tumacácori National Historical Park, Arizona, 1991–2020 normals, extremes 1946–present
Month	Jan	Feb	Mar	Apr	May	Jun	Jul	Aug	Sep	Oct	Nov	Dec	Year
Record high °F (°C)	89 (32)	92 (33)	95 (35)	100 (38)	109 (43)	113 (45)	113 (45)	108 (42)	108 (42)	104 (40)	93 (34)	88 (31)	113 (45)
Mean maximum °F (°C)	77.4 (25.2)	79.8 (26.6)	85.5 (29.7)	91.6 (33.1)	98.3 (36.8)	105.0 (40.6)	104.2 (40.1)	100.6 (38.1)	97.6 (36.4)	93.3 (34.1)	84.3 (29.1)	77.0 (25.0)	106.2 (41.2)
Mean daily maximum °F (°C)	63.3 (17.4)	65.7 (18.7)	71.8 (22.1)	78.2 (25.7)	86.0 (30.0)	95.1 (35.1)	93.4 (34.1)	91.2 (32.9)	88.5 (31.4)	81.1 (27.3)	71.3 (21.8)	62.7 (17.1)	79.0 (26.1)
Daily mean °F (°C)	47.7 (8.7)	49.7 (9.8)	54.9 (12.7)	60.4 (15.8)	67.6 (19.8)	77.1 (25.1)	80.1 (26.7)	78.5 (25.8)	74.1 (23.4)	64.5 (18.1)	54.7 (12.6)	47.2 (8.4)	63.0 (17.2)
Mean daily minimum °F (°C)	32.0 (0.0)	33.8 (1.0)	38.0 (3.3)	42.5 (5.8)	49.1 (9.5)	59.0 (15.0)	66.8 (19.3)	65.8 (18.8)	59.8 (15.4)	47.9 (8.8)	38.2 (3.4)	31.8 (−0.1)	47.1 (8.4)
Mean minimum °F (°C)	20.2 (−6.6)	22.6 (−5.2)	26.2 (−3.2)	31.2 (−0.4)	38.5 (3.6)	48.1 (8.9)	57.4 (14.1)	59.0 (15.0)	49.1 (9.5)	34.8 (1.6)	23.7 (−4.6)	19.8 (−6.8)	16.8 (−8.4)
Record low °F (°C)	4 (−16)	9 (−13)	15 (−9)	20 (−7)	28 (−2)	38 (3)	42 (6)	47 (8)	36 (2)	18 (−8)	9 (−13)	5 (−15)	4 (−16)
Average precipitation inches (mm)	1.15 (29)	1.07 (27)	0.81 (21)	0.31 (7.9)	0.17 (4.3)	0.47 (12)	3.79 (96)	3.35 (85)	1.83 (46)	1.09 (28)	0.89 (23)	1.02 (26)	15.95 (405)
Average snowfall inches (cm)	0.1 (0.25)	0.0 (0.0)	0.0 (0.0)	0.0 (0.0)	0.0 (0.0)	0.0 (0.0)	0.0 (0.0)	0.0 (0.0)	0.0 (0.0)	0.0 (0.0)	0.0 (0.0)	0.0 (0.0)	0.1 (0.25)
Average precipitation days (≥ 0.01 inch)	3.6	3.9	2.7	1.5	0.7	1.8	11.4	10.1	5.0	2.5	2.1	3.7	49.0
Average snowy days (≥ 0.1 inch)	0.0	0.0	0.0	0.0	0.0	0.0	0.0	0.0	0.0	0.0	0.0	0.0	0.0
Source: NOAA

== Demographics ==
Historical population
Census	Pop.	Note	%±
2020	329		—
U.S. Decennial Census

As of the census of 2000, there were 569 people, 223 households, and 152 families residing in the CDP. The population density was 91.6 inhabitants per square mile (35.4/km^{2}). There were 252 housing units at an average density of 40.6 per square mile (15.7/km^{2}). The racial makeup of the CDP was 77.0% White, 0.2% Black or African American, 1.0% Native American, 1.8% Asian, 17.6% from other races, and 2.6% from two or more races. 58.0% of the population were Hispanic or Latino of any race.

There were 223 households, out of which 26.5% had children under the age of 18 living with them, 52.9% were married couples living together, 9.9% had a female householder with no husband present, and 31.8% were non-families. 27.8% of all households were made up of individuals, and 9.9% had someone living alone who was 65 years of age or older. The average household size was 2.55, and the average family size was 3.13.

In the CDP, the population was spread out, with 23.7% under the age of 18, 7.7% from 18 to 24, 26.0% from 25 to 44, 28.6% from 45 to 64, and 13.9% who were 65 years of age or older. The median age was 41 years. For every 100 females, there were 96.9 males. For every 100 females age 18 and over, there were 96.4 males.

The median income for a household in the CDP was $35,938, and the median income for a family was $36,250. Males had a median income of $26,806 versus $18,594 for females. The per capita income for the CDP was $18,607. About 10.1% of families and 10.8% of the population were below the poverty line, including none of those under age 18 and 26.3% of those age 65 or over.

== Arts and culture ==
Tumacacori National Park Museum, once used by the Franciscan missionaries in the Mission San José de Tumacácori.

== See also ==
- List of census-designated places in Arizona
- Mission San José de Tumacácori
- Sonoita Creek
