= Peña Blanca Lake =

Lake in Santa Cruz County, Arizona

- Location within Arizona
- Location: Santa Cruz County, Arizona, United States
- Coordinates: 31°24′1″N 111°5′16″W
- Type: reservoir
- Primary inflows: Peña Blanca Wash
- Primary outflows: Peña Blanca Wash
- Basin countries: United States
- Surface area: 45 acres (18 ha)
- Max. depth: 65 ft (20 m)
- Surface elevation: 3,819 ft (1,164 m)

Peña Blanca Lake is a reservoir in Arizona, United States, located 18 miles (29 km) northwest of Nogales. The facilities are maintained by the Coronado National Forest division of the USDA Forest Service.

== History ==
In the 1730s, Juan Bautista de Anza established Sicurisuta Ranch by the lake. Originally slated for completion in 1955, various setbacks delayed the completion of the dam to 1957. Just as the lake was filling in the early 1958, a piece of heavy machinery fell into the lake and to recover it, the lake needed to be drained. By March 18, 1958, the lake was filled. The total cost of construction was $125,000 which was paid for equally from the sale of hunting and fishing licenses in Arizona and the Dingell-Jonhson Act.

A resort was opened in 1959 that contained a six-room motel, restaurant, bait and tackle shop, and general store. The resort was closed by the U.S. Forest Service in June of 1969 after new owner Dan Bartos failed to comply with requirements of the operating permit. It reopened two months later when the previous owner, Ray C. Wagoner resumed control. Four months later, the resort was shut down again as the Forest Service refused to renew the special use permit due to facilities not being kept up to expected standards. The resort was reopened in 1971 after ownership was reverted back to the original builder, Milford Kay, who improved the resort by installing a properly working sewage system. The resort operated until 1996 when it was closed due to failure to comply to the special permit conditions to bring the resort up to code. In May of 2002, the buildings were demolished due to safety reasons as the buildings were destroyed by vandalism.

In 2008, the lake was closed and drained to clean mercury contamination within the sediment, thought to be from old mines in the area. The lake was reopened in August 2009. In 2013, an Arizona Department of Environmental Quality report showed that mercury levels were similar to those before the lake was drained and dredged. One potential cause for the high mercury could be naturally occurring mercury seeping through the faults or a spring in the lake, though these claims are still under investigation.

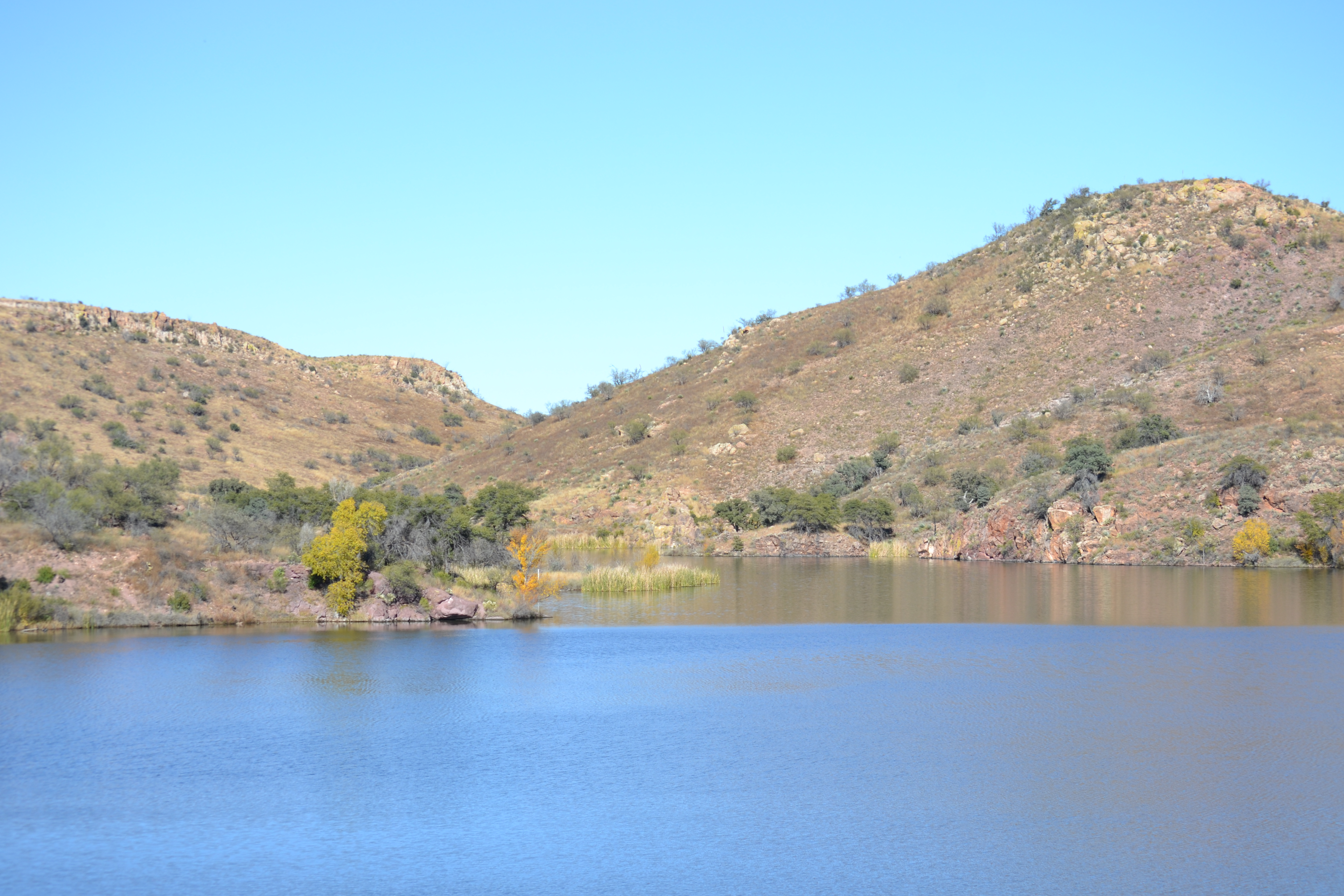
Pena Blanca Lake in 2014

== Fish species ==
Before Peña Blanca Lake was drained the fish population consisted of largemouth bass, bluegill, redear sunfish, green sunfish, black crappie, channel catfish, and black bullhead. Stocked rainbow trout could be found in the lake as well. Today the fish species that inhabit the lake are channel catfish, yellow bullhead, largemouth bass, bluegill, black crappie, and redear sunfish. Stocked rainbow trout are stocked from October to March about once a month unless water quality is poor. Crayfish are also present.
