= Buenos Aires National Wildlife Refuge =

Protected area in Pima County, Arizona

- IUCN category IV (habitat/species management area)
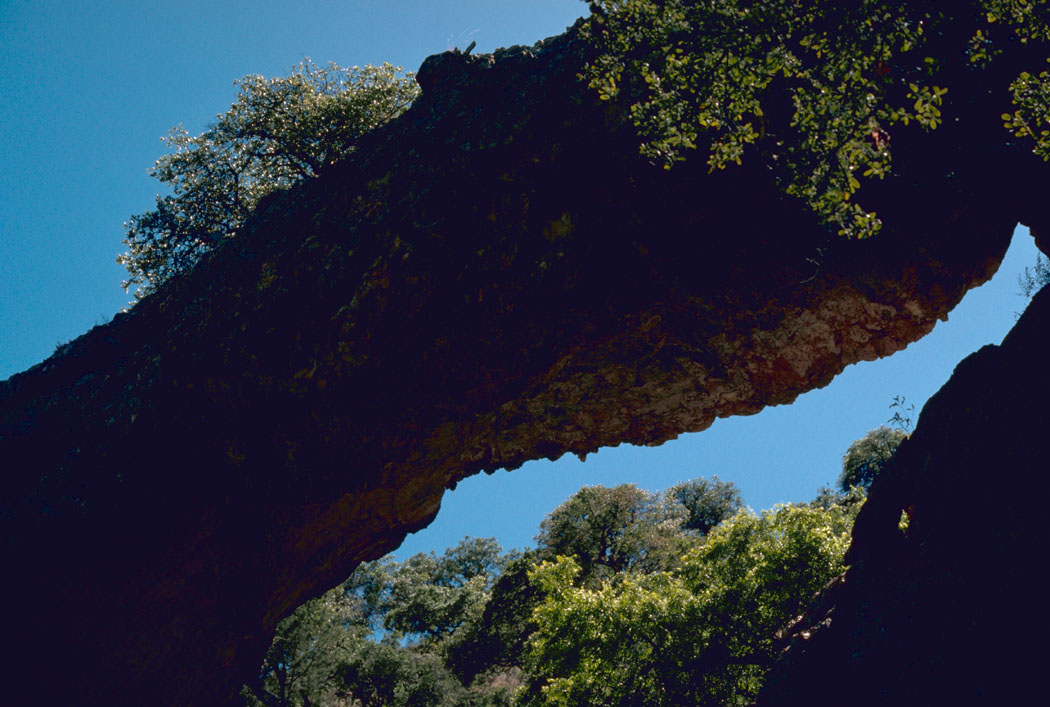
- A view in the refuge

- Location within Arizona Location within the United States
- Location: Pima County, Arizona, United States
- Nearest city: Arivaca, Arizona
- Coordinates: 31.5500891°N 111.550662°W
- Area: 117,107 acres (473.92 km^{2})
- Established: 1985
- Governing body: U.S. Fish and Wildlife Service
- Website: Official website

Buenos Aires National Wildlife Refuge (Buenos Aires NWR) provides 117,107 acres (47,392 ha) of habitat for threatened and endangered plants and animals. This refuge, in Pima County, Arizona, was established in 1985.

== Natural history ==
The semidesert grassland supports the reintroduction of Masked quail and pronghorns. Prescribed and natural fires play a major role in maintaining and restoring the sea of grass that once filled the Altar Valley. Riparian (wetland) areas along Arivaca Cienega and Arivaca Creek attract an abundance of birds. Brown Canyon, to the west of the Arivaca Creek area, is nestled in the Baboquivari Mountains, where a sycamore-lined stream meanders through oak woodland.

== Fauna ==
The refuge is home to 58 mammal species. Among the larger species are mule deer, white-tailed deer, pronghorn, javelina and puma. There are also more than 325 different bird species and 53 species of reptiles and amphibians. Reintroduced masked bobwhite (Colinus virginianus ridgwayi) are found in the refuge.

Occasional jaguar vagrants are reported in the area, which is contiguous with Mexico. Between 2004 and 2007 an old male jaguar was followed by researchers in the area. The animal was called 'Macho B' by the researchers and has been previously photographed in 1996 in the area. During the study its home range compassed the mountains to east and west of the Altar Valley, which is situated in the Refuge. In addition at least one other jaguar was recorded in the area during that study.

The male jaguar, 'Macho B', is dead. The jaguar was euthanized after being captured on a snare trap.

== Access ==
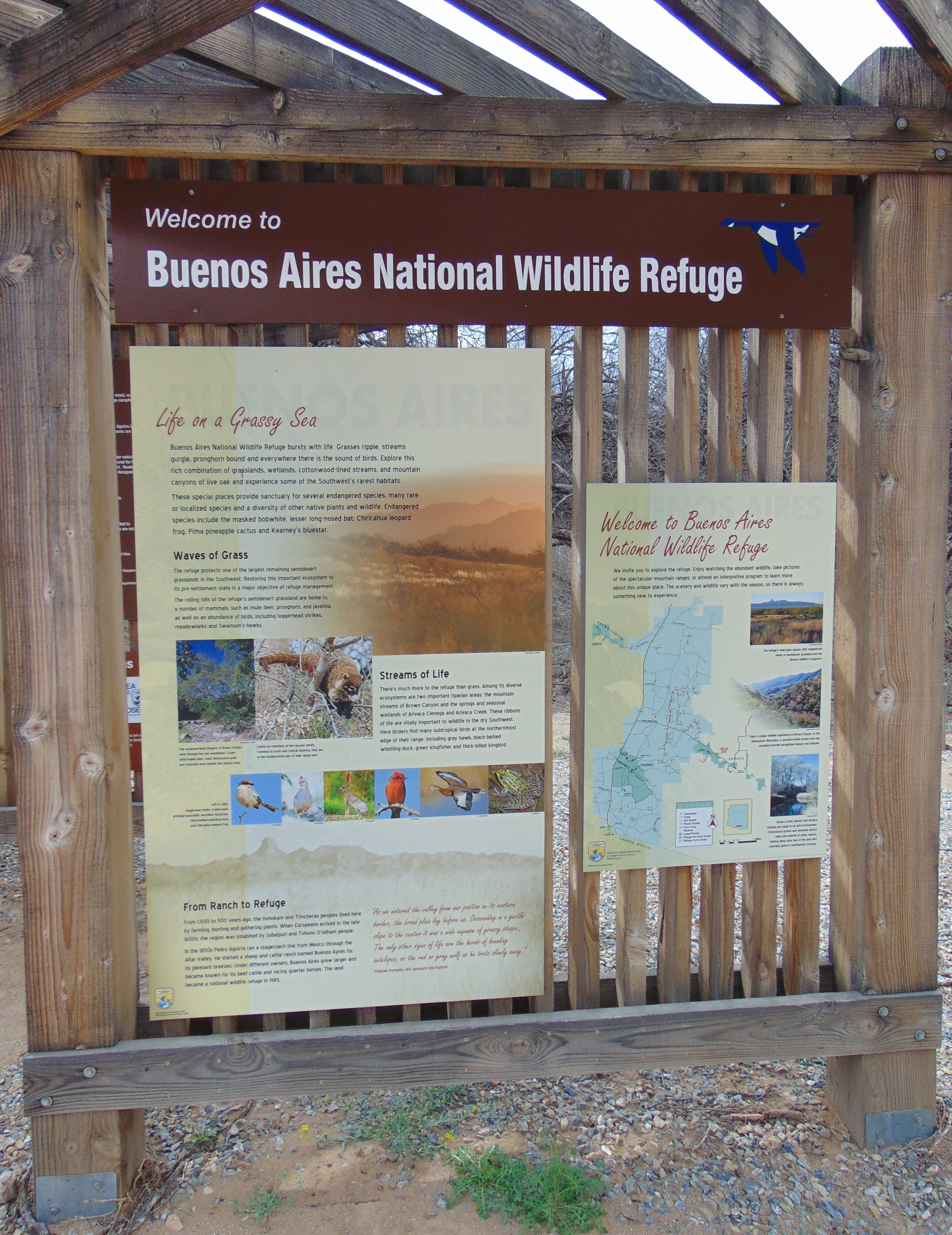
Welcome sign at the Arivaca Creek trailhead.

Most of the Buenos Aires National Wildlife Refuge is open for visiting and research. Guided access is also available through Friends of Buenos Aires NWR programs. The Arivaca Cienega Trail and the Arivaca Creek Trail are National Recreation Trails.

Some 3,500 acres (1,400 ha) of the refuge (about 3% of its area) was closed in 2006 to public access due to human safety concerns. At that time there was a marked increase in violence along the border due to human and drug trafficking. The closed area extends north from the international border roughly 3/4 mile (1,200 m) away. As of 2010, this portion remains closed; however, the Fish and Wildlife Service reports a marked decline in violence.

Environmental degradation is the most visible consequence of border crossings through the refuge. A few years ago, there were 45 abandoned cars on the Buenos Aires refuge near Sasabe, Arizona and enough trash that a volunteer couple filled 723 large bags with 18,000 pounds (8,200 kg) of garbage over two months in 2002.

== See also ==
- Sayre, Nathan f. Species of capital: Ranching, endangered species, and urbanization in the southwest. Tucson: university of Arizona press, 2002.
- Arivaca, Arizona
- Sonoran Desert wiki-index
- List of largest National Wildlife Refuges
- List of protected grasslands of North America

== Reference links ==
This article incorporates public domain material from websites or documents of the United States Fish and Wildlife Service.
