= Santa Cruz River (Arizona) =

River in Arizona, United States

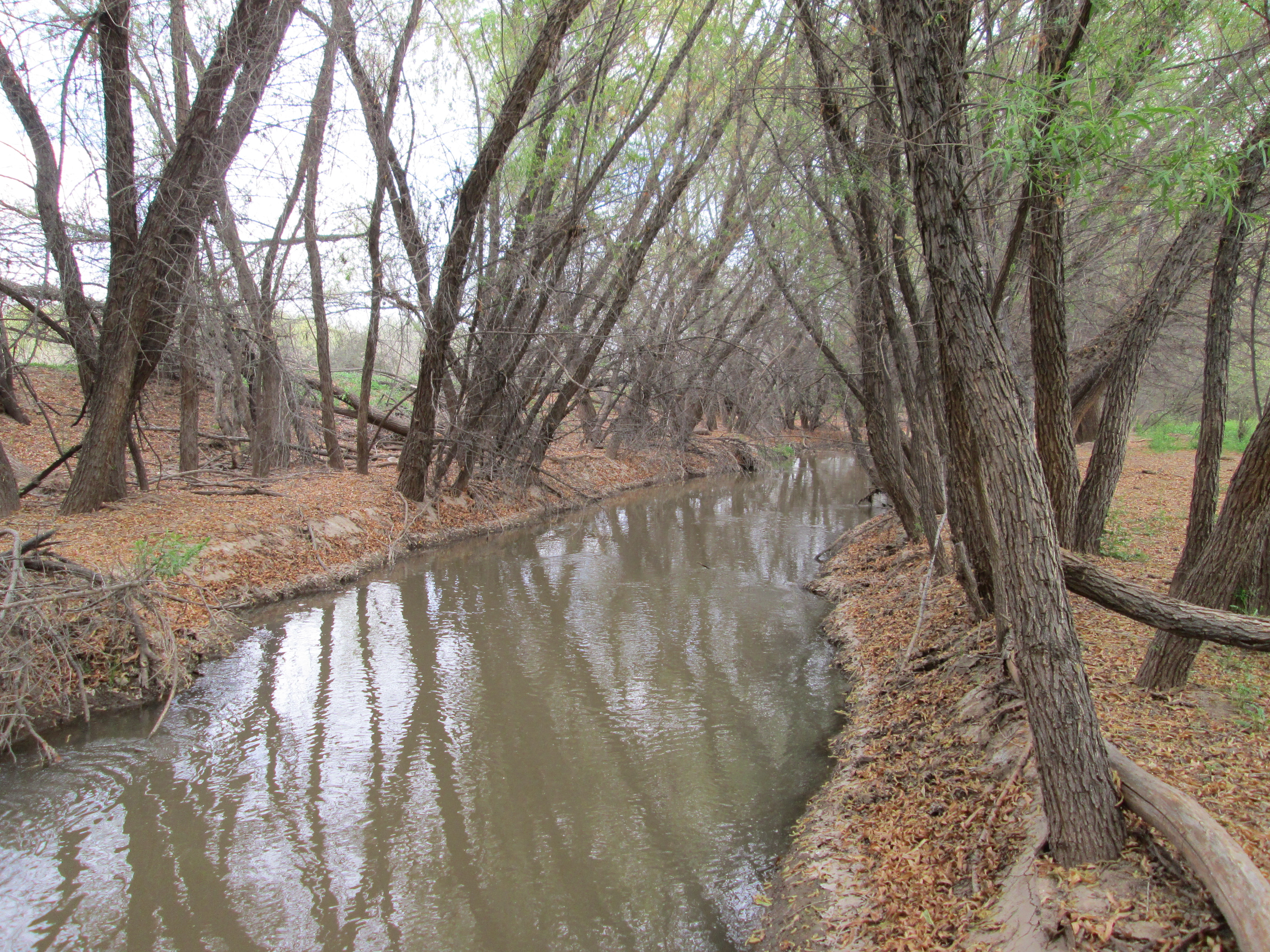
- The Santa Cruz River near Red Rock.

Location
- Countries: United States, Mexico
- States: Arizona, Sonora

Physical characteristics
- Source: San Rafael Valley
  - location: Santa Cruz County, Arizona
  - coordinates: 31°27′16″N 110°35′17″W
- Mouth: Gila River
  - location: Santa Cruz Flats
  - coordinates: 33°15′22″N 112°11′18″W
  - elevation: 1,014 ft (309 m)
- Length: 184 mi (296 km)

Basin features
- Tributaries
  - left: Brawley Wash
  - right: Sonoita Creek, Rillito River, Canada del Oro

The Santa Cruz River (Spanish: Río Santa Cruz "Holy Cross River") is a left tributary of the Gila River in Southern Arizona and northern Sonora, Mexico. It is approximately 184 miles (296 km) long.

== Course ==
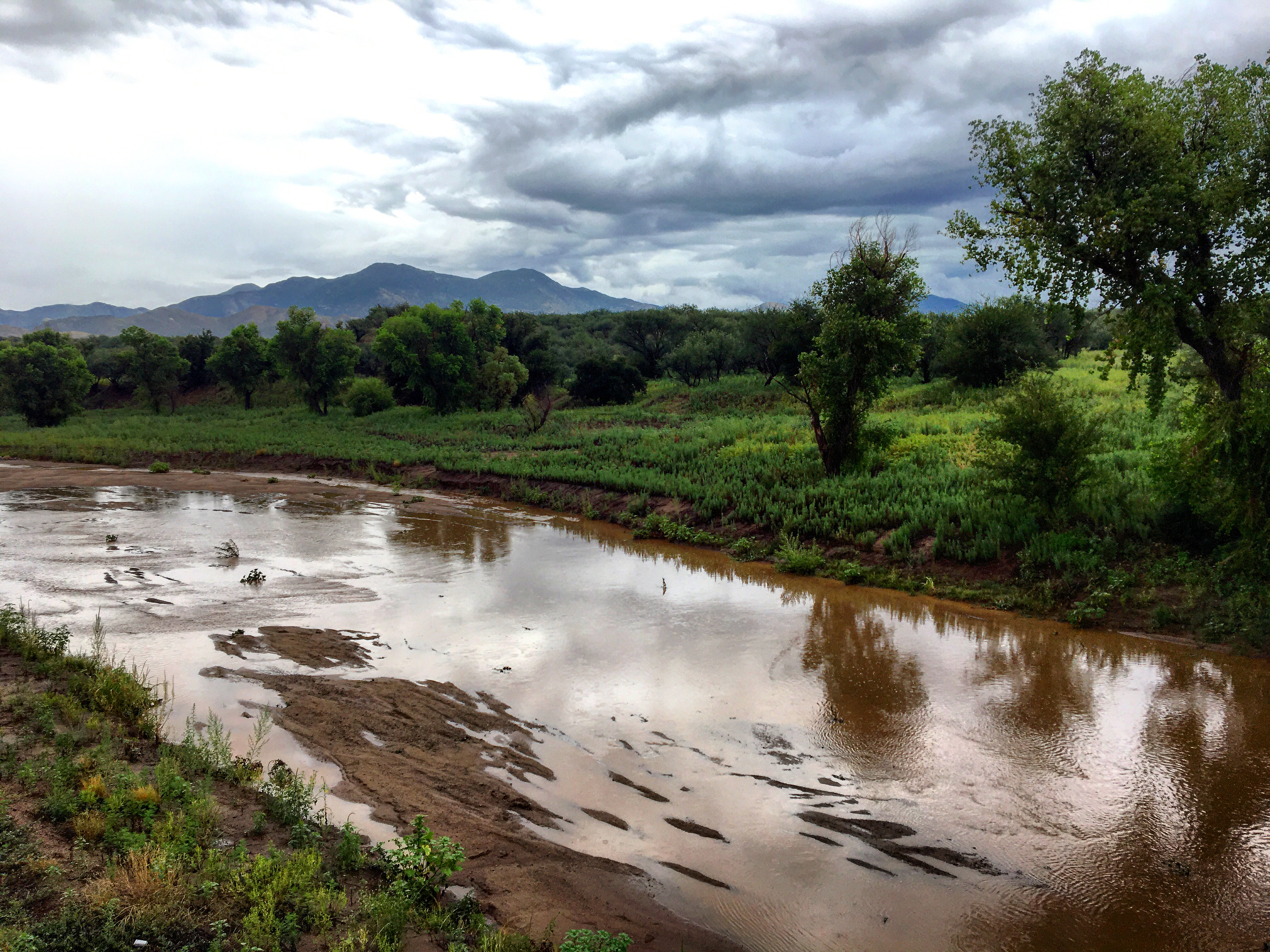
The Santa Cruz River east of Nogales just after re-entering the United States from Mexico.

The Santa Cruz has its headwaters in the high intermontane grasslands of the San Rafael Valley to the southeast of Patagonia, Arizona, between the Canelo Hills to the east and the Patagonia Mountains to the west, just north of the international border. It flows southward into Mexico past Santa Cruz, Sonora, and turns westward around the south end of the Sierra San Antonio near Miguel Hidalgo (San Lázaro), thence north-northwest to reenter the United States just to the east of Nogales and southwest of Kino Springs. It then continues northward from the international border past the Tumacacori National Historical Park, Tubac, Green Valley, Sahuarita, San Xavier del Bac, Tucson, Marana, and Picacho Peak State Park to the Santa Cruz Flats just to the south of Casa Grande and the Gila River. Before the development of agriculture in the Santa Cruz Flats, the river's course went right through the flats. As development started, the Greene Canal was formed to divert the Santa Cruz River to the Greene Wash to maximize agriculture in the area. Because of this diversion, the original Santa Cruz River riverbed was destroyed. From the Greene Canal, the Greene Wash empties into the Santa Rosa Wash which empties into the original Santa Cruz River riverbed. This riverbed is followed all the way until it terminates at the Gila River. Between Nogales and Tucson the river valley is flanked by the San Cayetano and Santa Rita Mountains on the east and the Atascosa, Tumacacori, and Sierrita Mountains on the west.

== Hydrography ==
Most of the Santa Cruz River is usually a dry riverbed, unless the area receives significant rainfall. This was not always the case, but a combination of human errors and natural catastrophes in the late nineteenth century led to the decline of the Santa Cruz. Prior to this, water flowed perennially in a number of places, including along nine stretches in the Tucson area, and the river's banks were lined with cottonwood and mesquite bosques. Although there is some disagreement among historians and hydrologists as to what the biggest causes of the river's decline were, contributing human factors included overgrazing, excessive pumping of groundwater for agricultural irrigation and industry, and the construction of dams and ditches. In the mid-20th century, the river's stretch through Tucson dried up completely.

The city of Nogales, Sonora, has been releasing treated sewage into the Santa Cruz River since 1951. This has resulted in the revival of approximately 9 miles (14 km) of riverbank within and north of the city of Nogales, Arizona.

In recent years, due to water conservation efforts and restoration projects, perennial flows have returned to a few parts of the Santa Cruz River in greater Tucson. In June 2019, the city of Tucson began releasing treated wastewater daily into the Santa Cruz River bed near West Silverlake Road as part of the Santa Cruz River Heritage Project. This has resulted in renewed perennial flow in an approximately 1-mile (1.6 km) stretch near downtown Tucson. Further upstream, perennial flows returned to a half-mile stretch of the river through the San Xavier Indian Reservation of the Tohono Oʼodham Nation in 2019 as a result of reduced ground water pumping due to greater availability of water from the Central Arizona Project. This has led to the revival of vegetated riparian zones along the river, including areas of cottonwood shoots and seep-willow. Further downstream at the Roger Road Waste Water Treatment Plant has been releasing treated wastewater, which extends the perennial flow of the river for approximately 46 miles (74 km).

== Recreation ==
The Juan Bautista de Anza National Historic Trail parallels much of the Santa Cruz. In Marana, there are approximately 10 miles (16 km) of paved multi-use recreational path along the Santa Cruz, located on Tangerine Road and through the Gladden Farms community park.

== Gallery ==
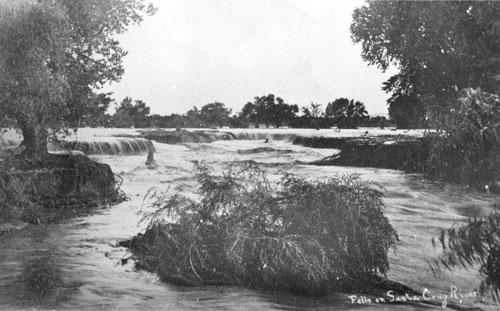
Little waterfalls along the Santa Cruz River in downtown Tucson in 1889.

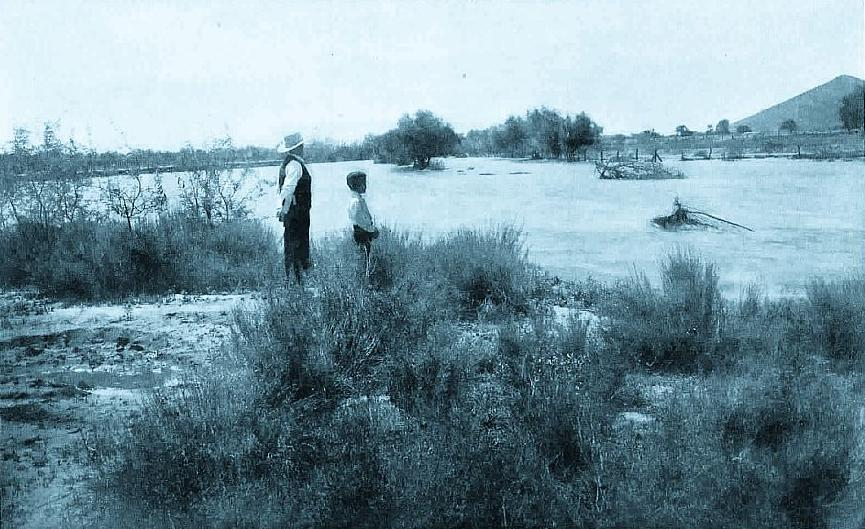
The Santa Cruz during a flood, c.1903.

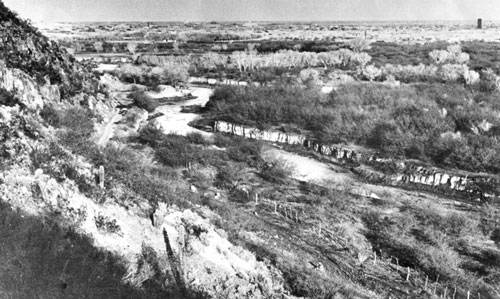
View of the Santa Cruz from "A" Mountain in 1904. Notice the riparian gallery forest, which has since become extinct.

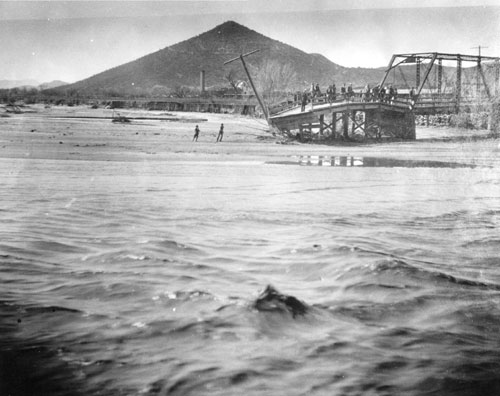
A wrecked bridge along the Santa Cruz during the flood of 1915. "A" Mountain is in the background.

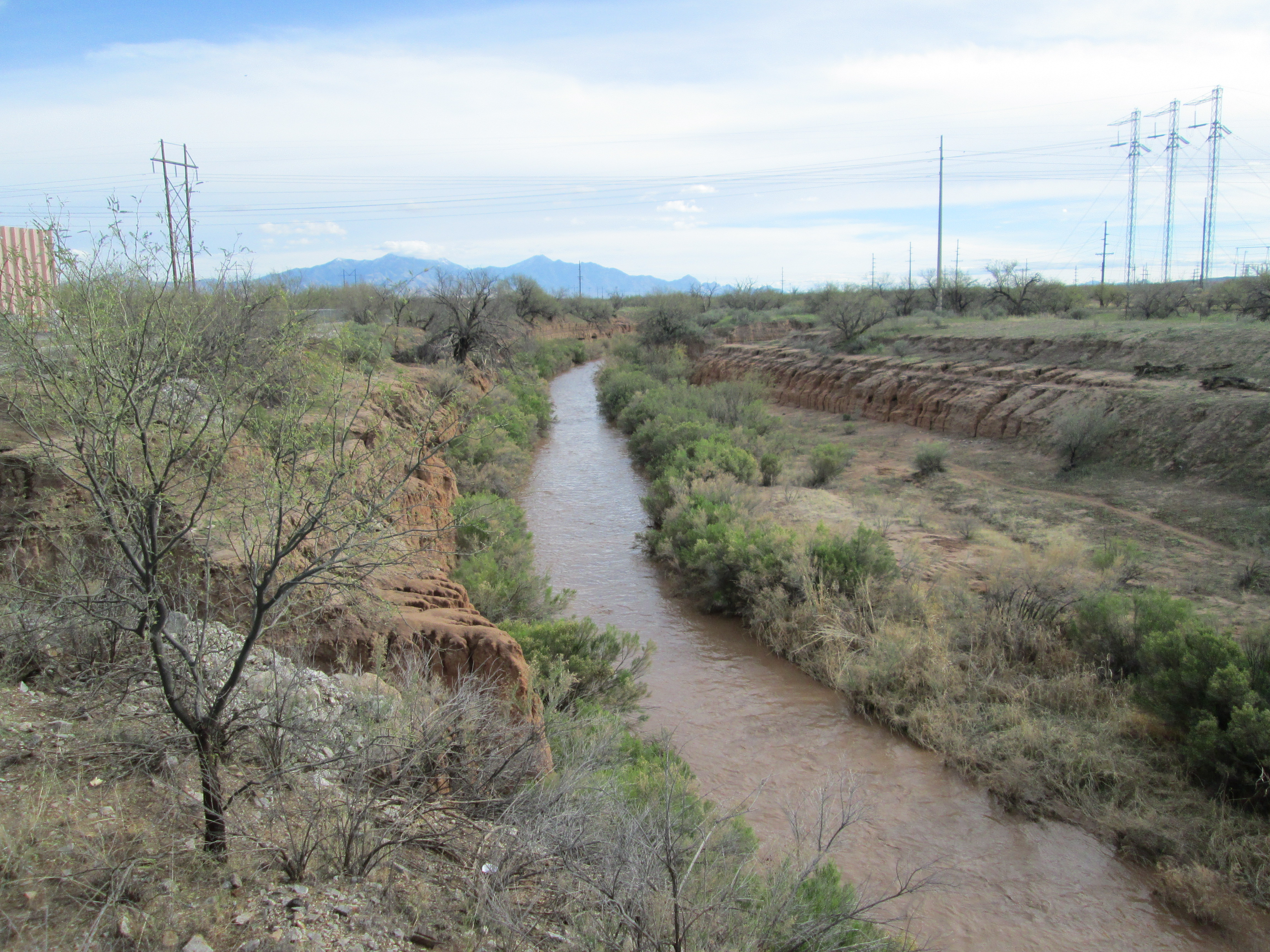
A view of the Santa Cruz south of Tucson, facing south. The Santa Rita Mountains are in the background.

The normally dry Santa Cruz river wash running high and fast after much heavier than normal rains in September 2014.

== See also ==
- List of rivers of Arizona
- Santa Cruz Catholic Church
