= List of mountain ranges of Arizona =

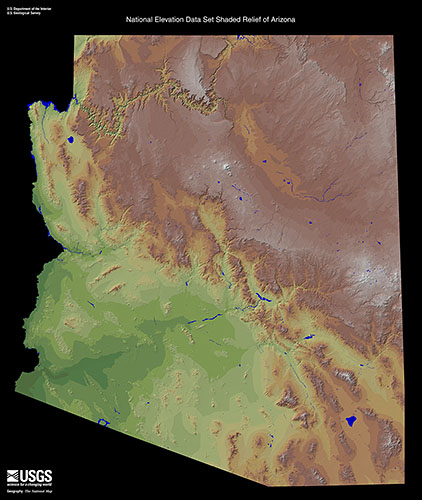
Shaded relief map, Arizona.

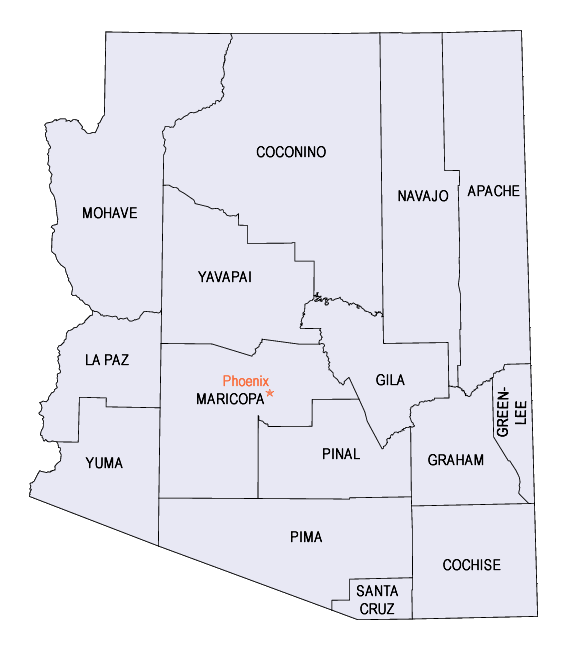
Arizona county index map

There are 210 named mountain ranges in Arizona. This list also includes mountain ranges that are mostly in New Mexico and Sonora, Mexico, that extend into Arizona.

== Alphabetical list ==
The southeast of Arizona, with New Mexico, northwest Chihuahua and northeast Sonora contain insular sky island mountain ranges, (the Madrean Sky Islands), or smaller subranges in association. There are also numerous Sonoran Desert ranges, or Arizona transition zone ranges. Northern and northeast Arizona also has scattered ranges throughout.

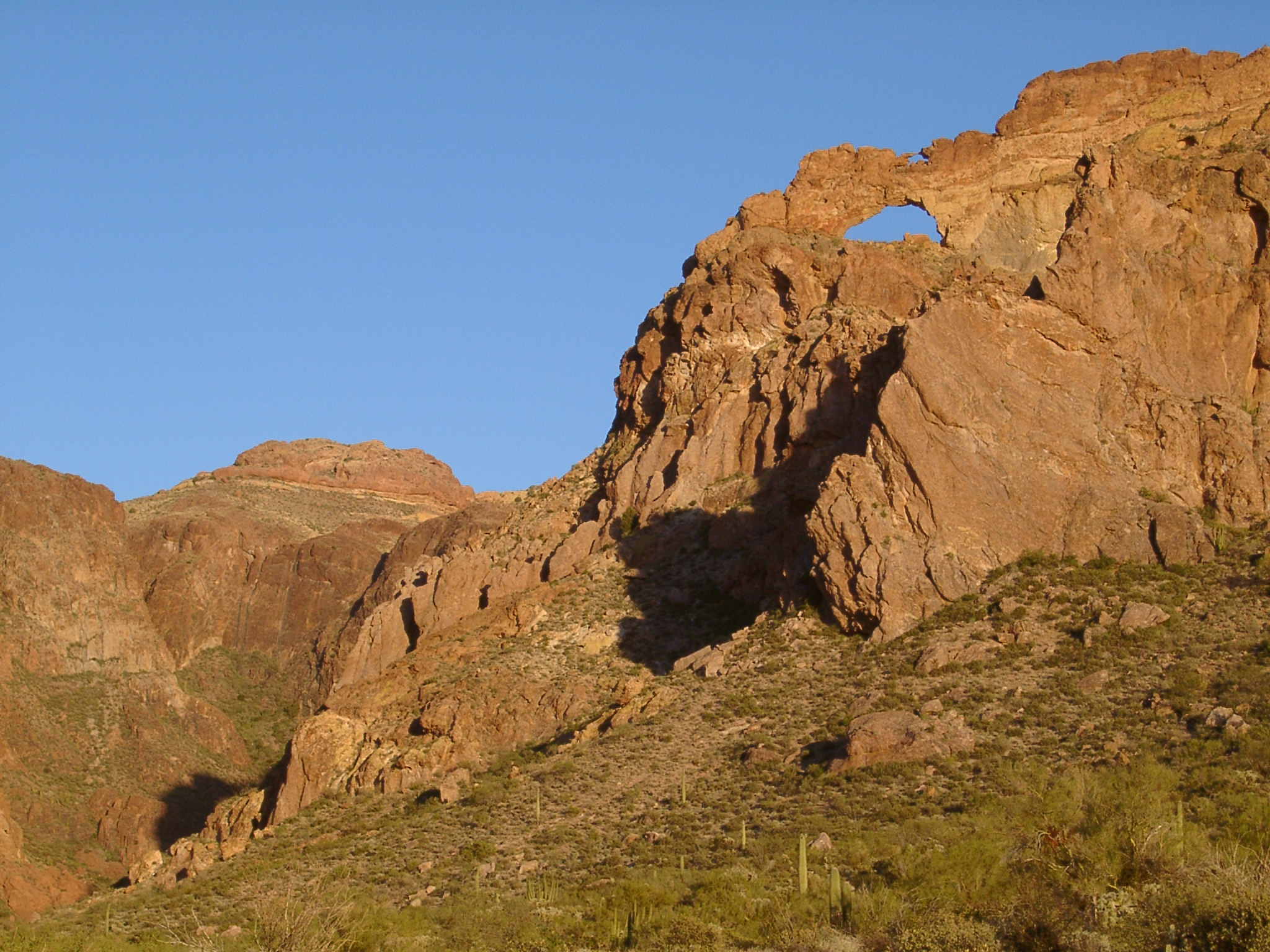
Ajo Range, Organ Pipe Cactus National Monument

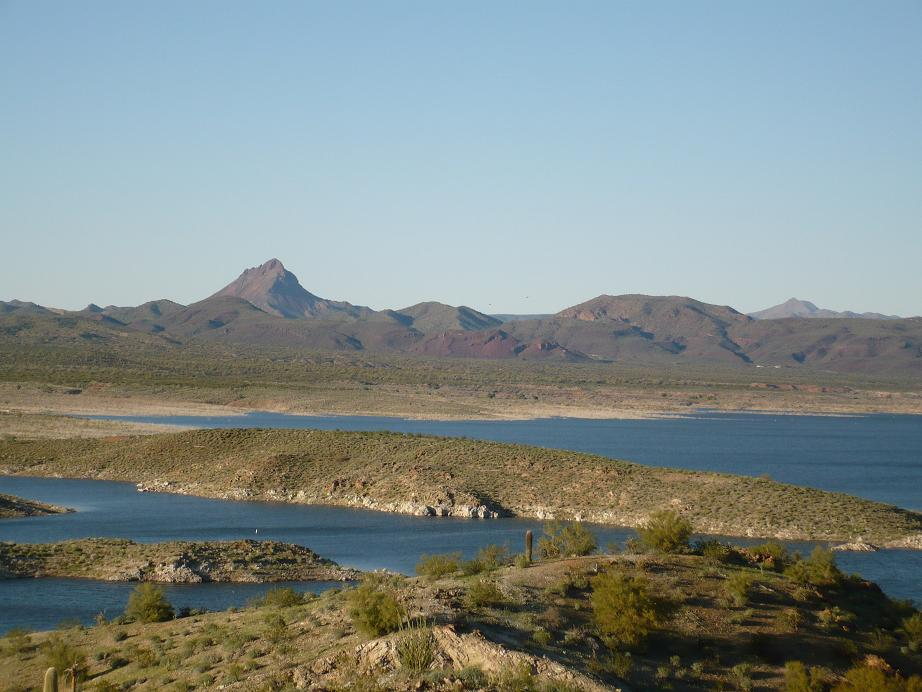
Artillery Mountains above Alamo Lake

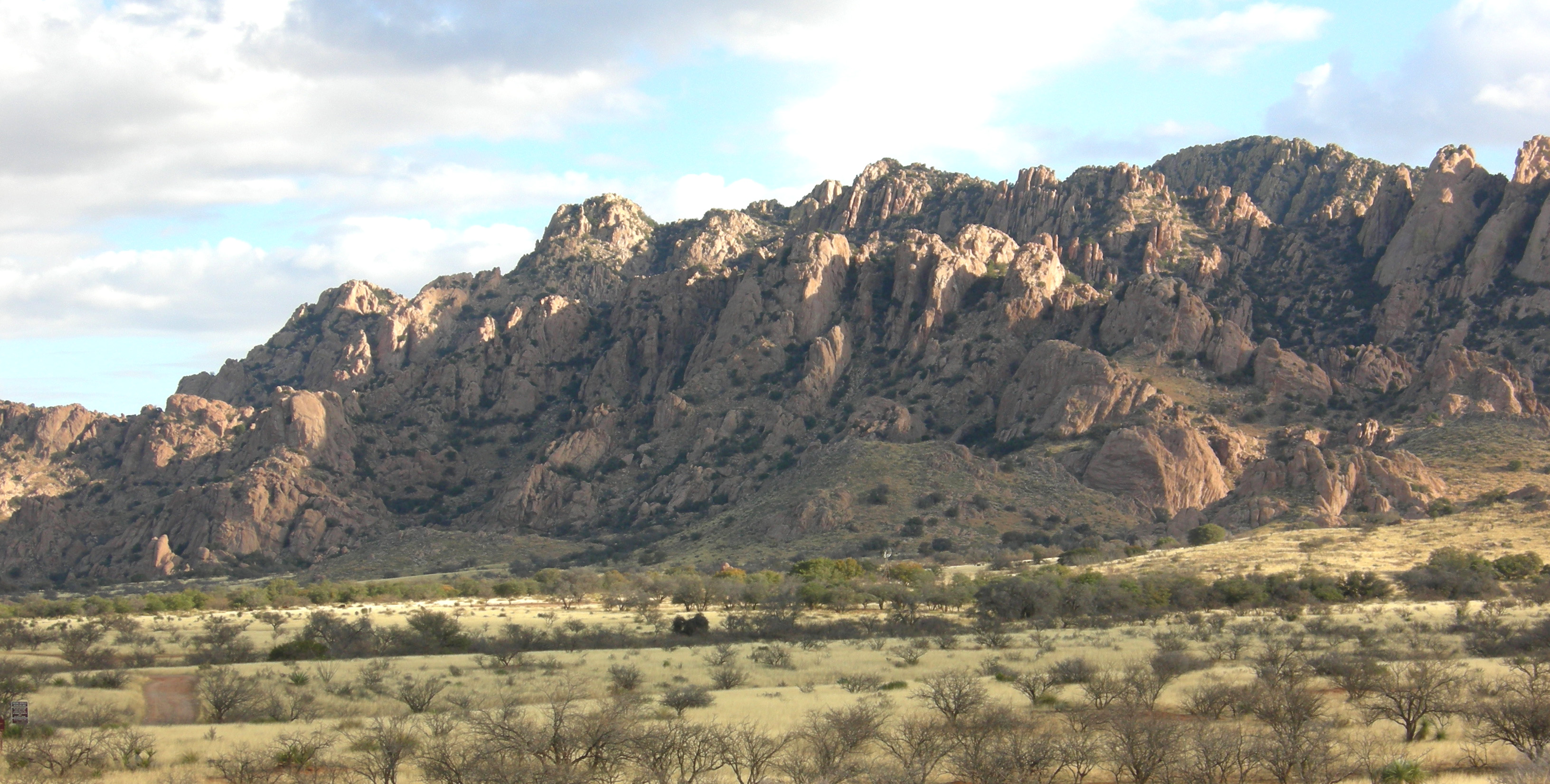
Dragoon Mountains

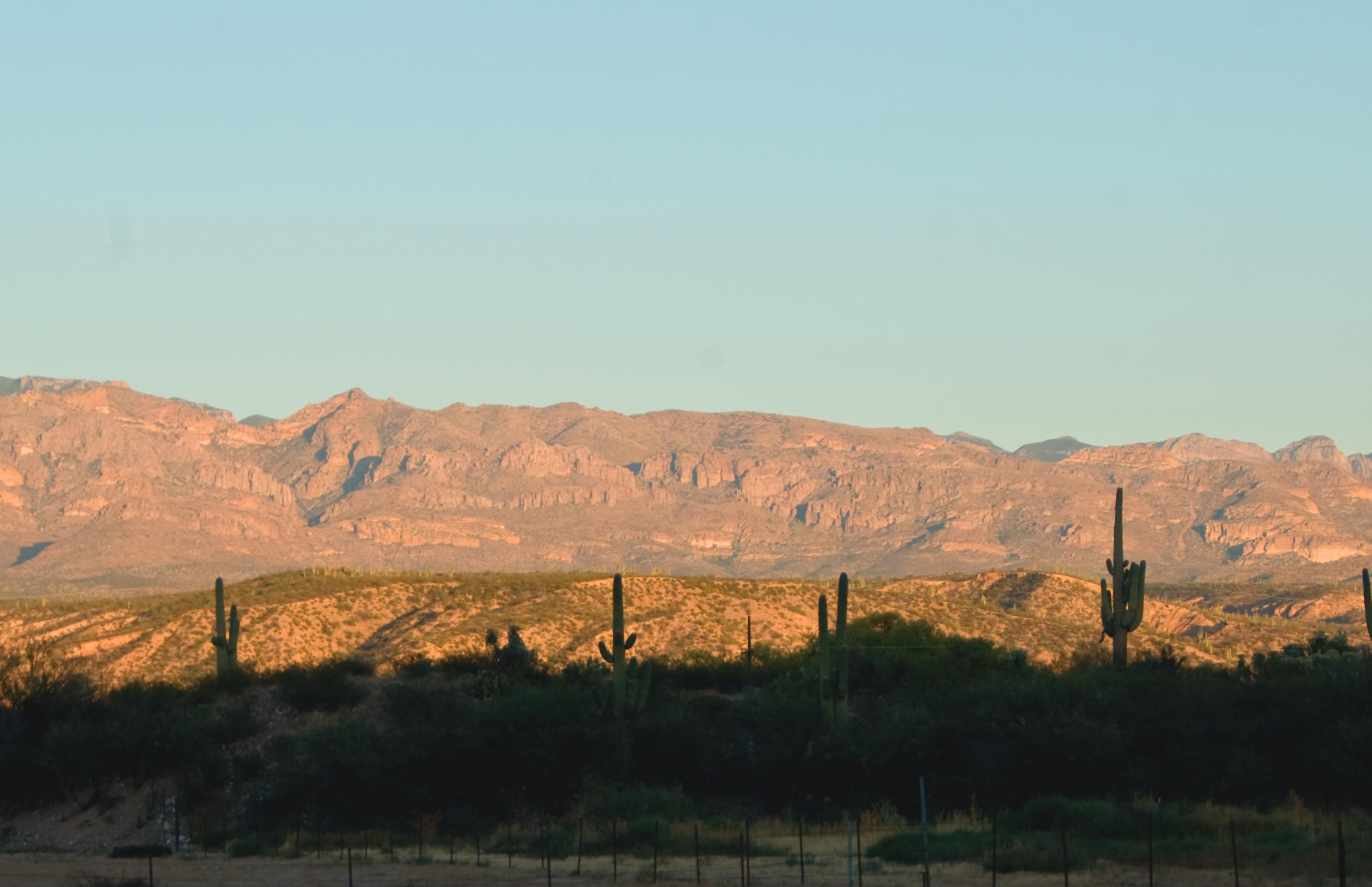
View of the Galiuro Mountains from San Manuel, Arizona

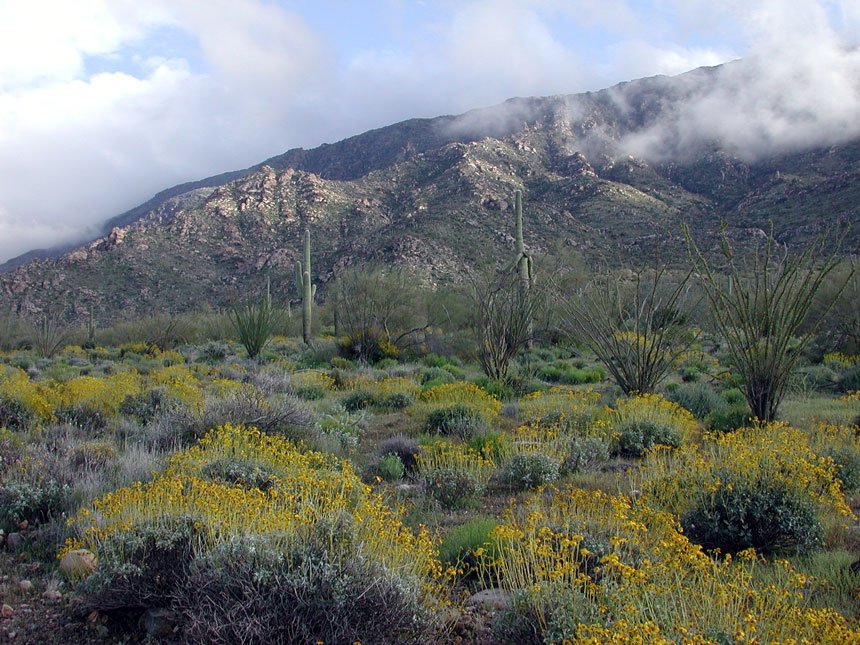
Harquahala Mountains in spring, 2009

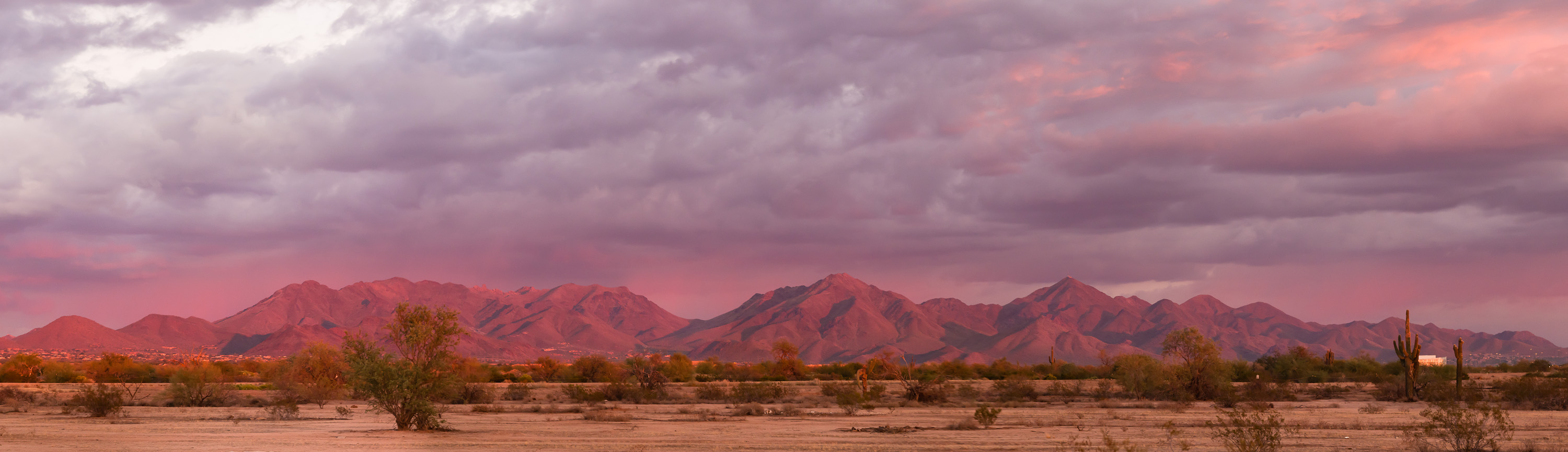
McDowell Mountains at sunset

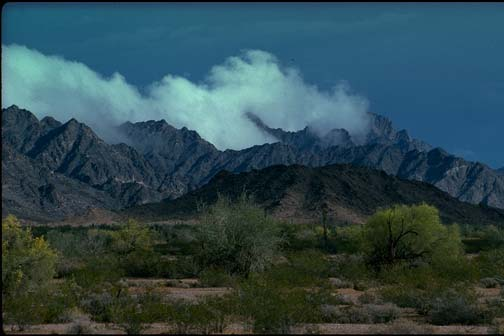
Low clouds on the Mohawk Mountains

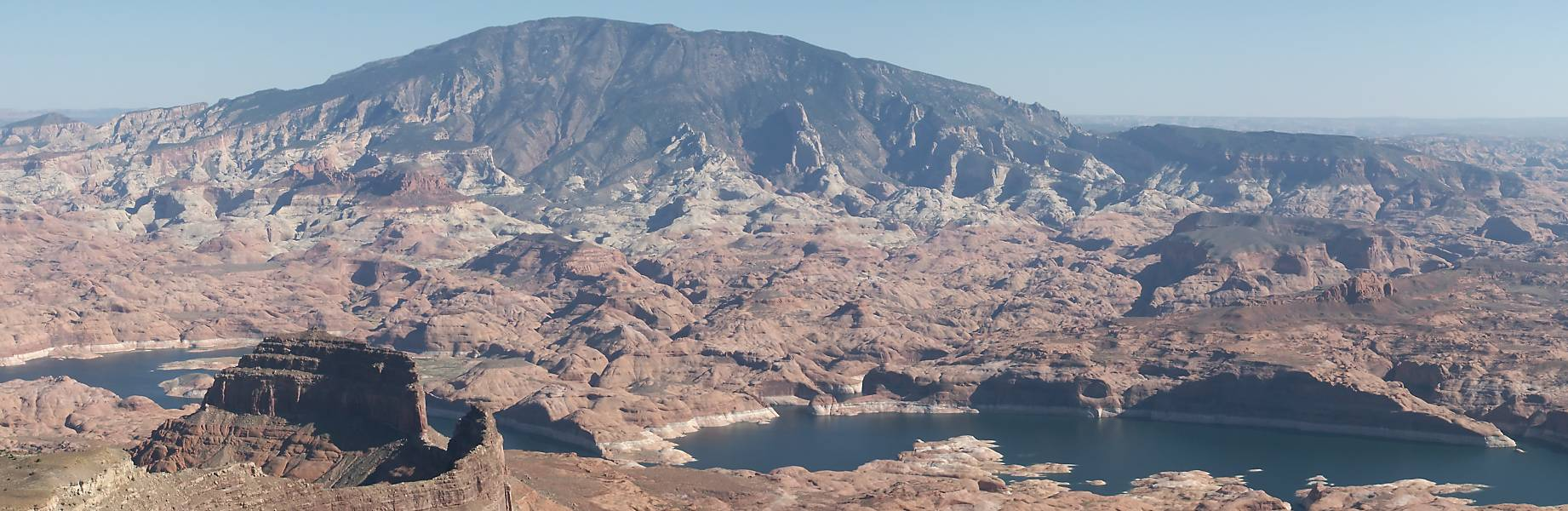
Navajo Mountain and Lake Powell, viewed from the north

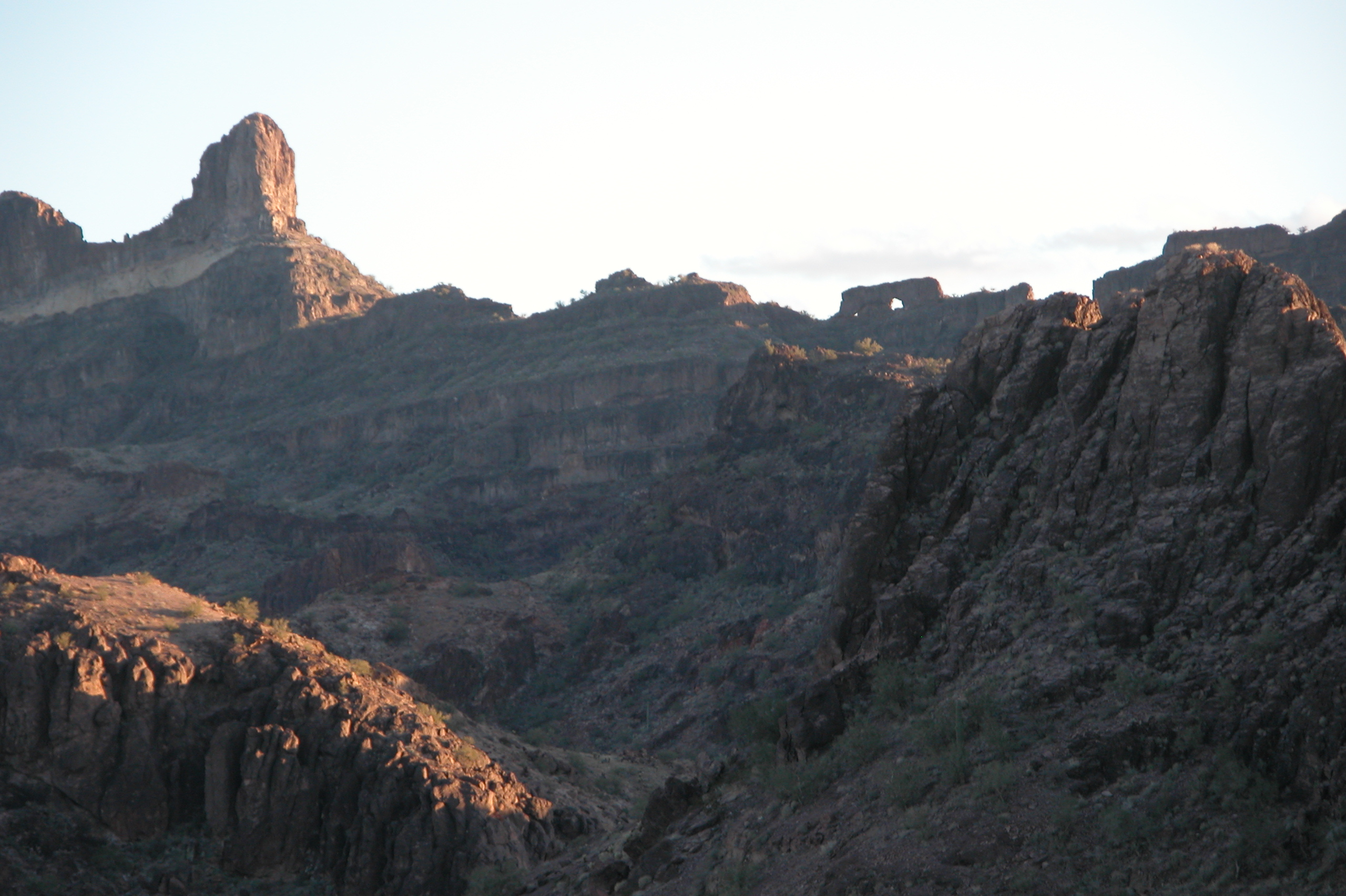
Eagle Eye Arch in the New Water Mountains

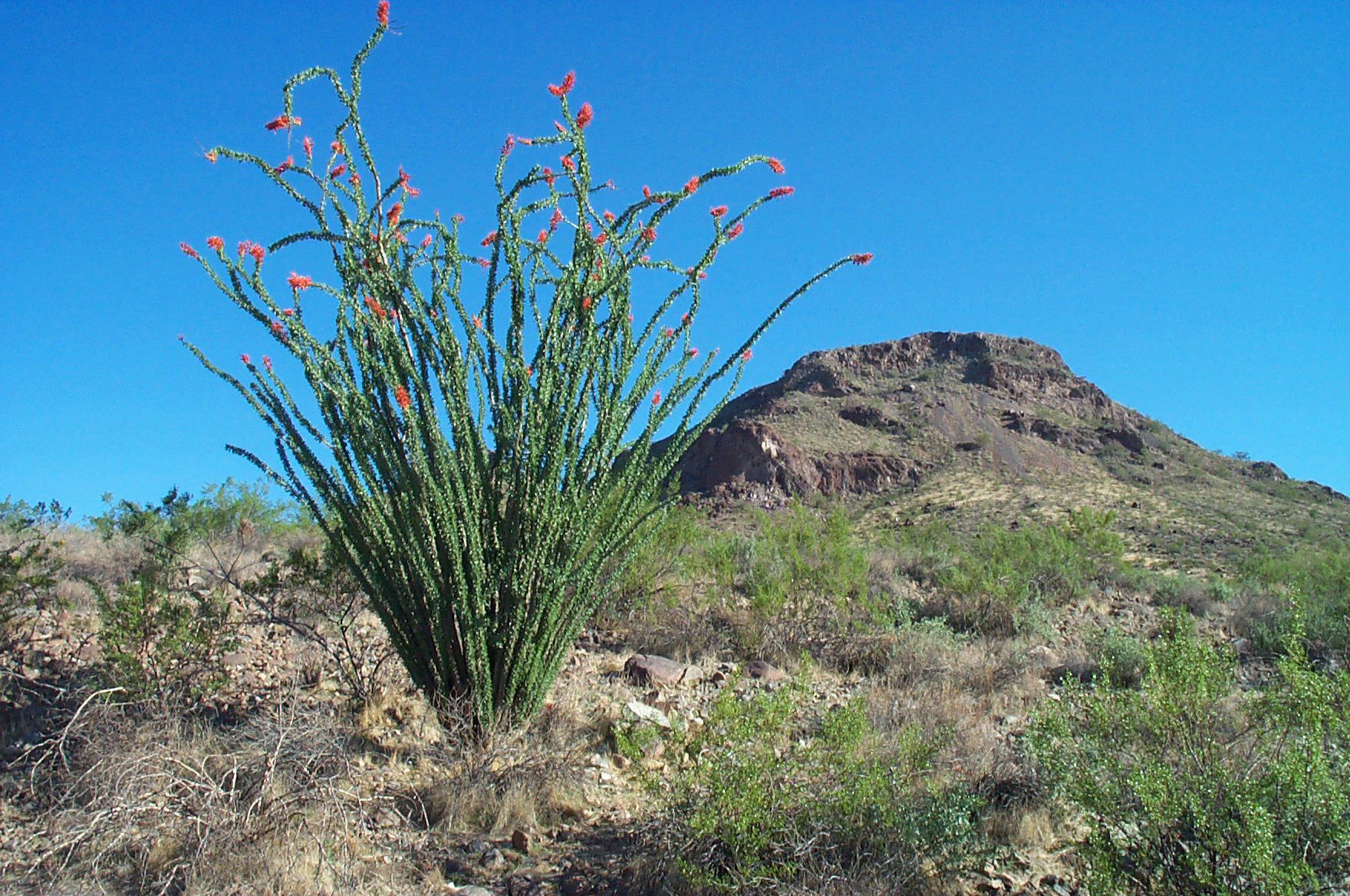
Ocotillo below Lookout Mountain, Phoenix Mountains

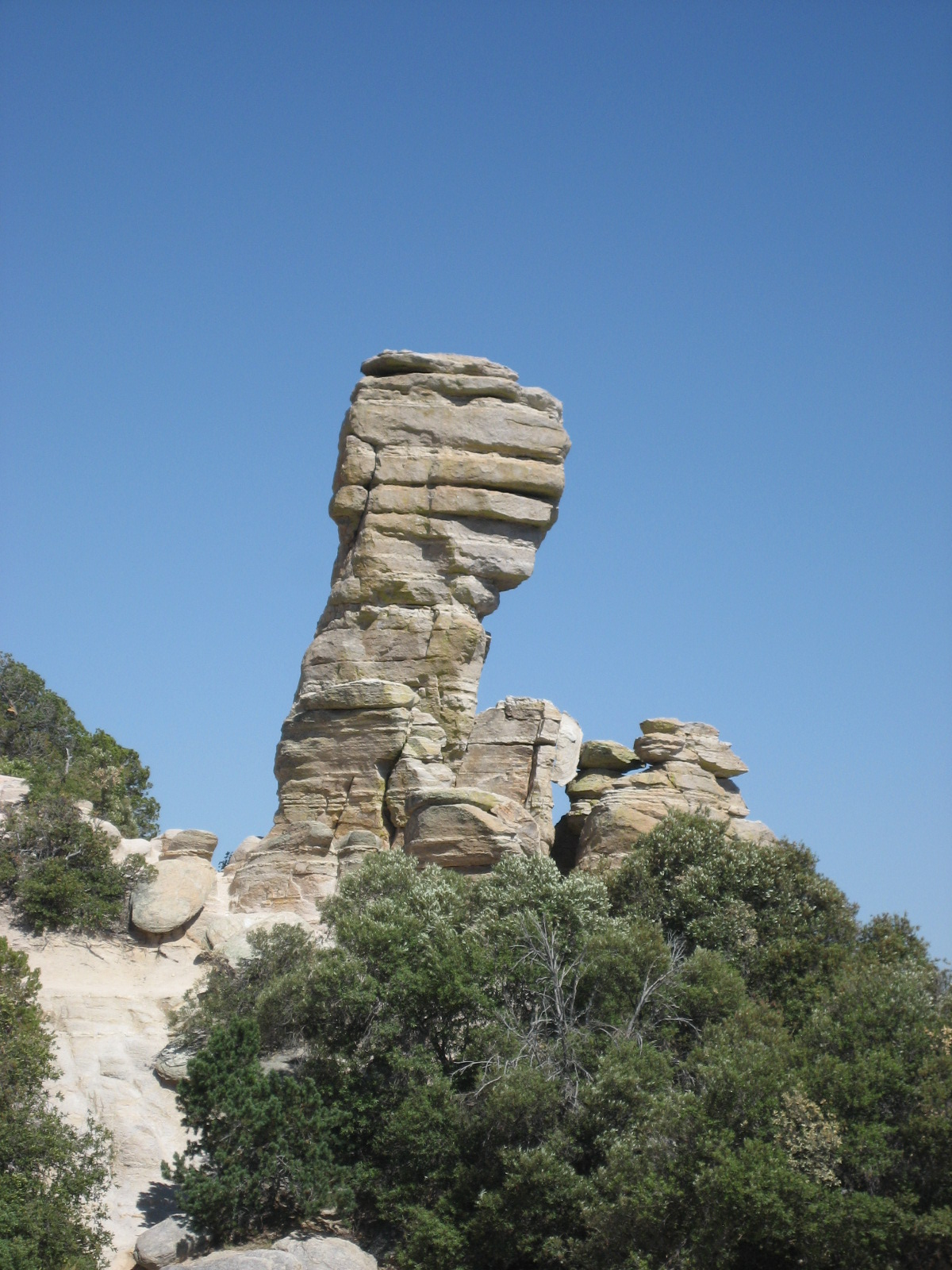
A rock pillar (hoodoo) in the Santa Catalina Mountains

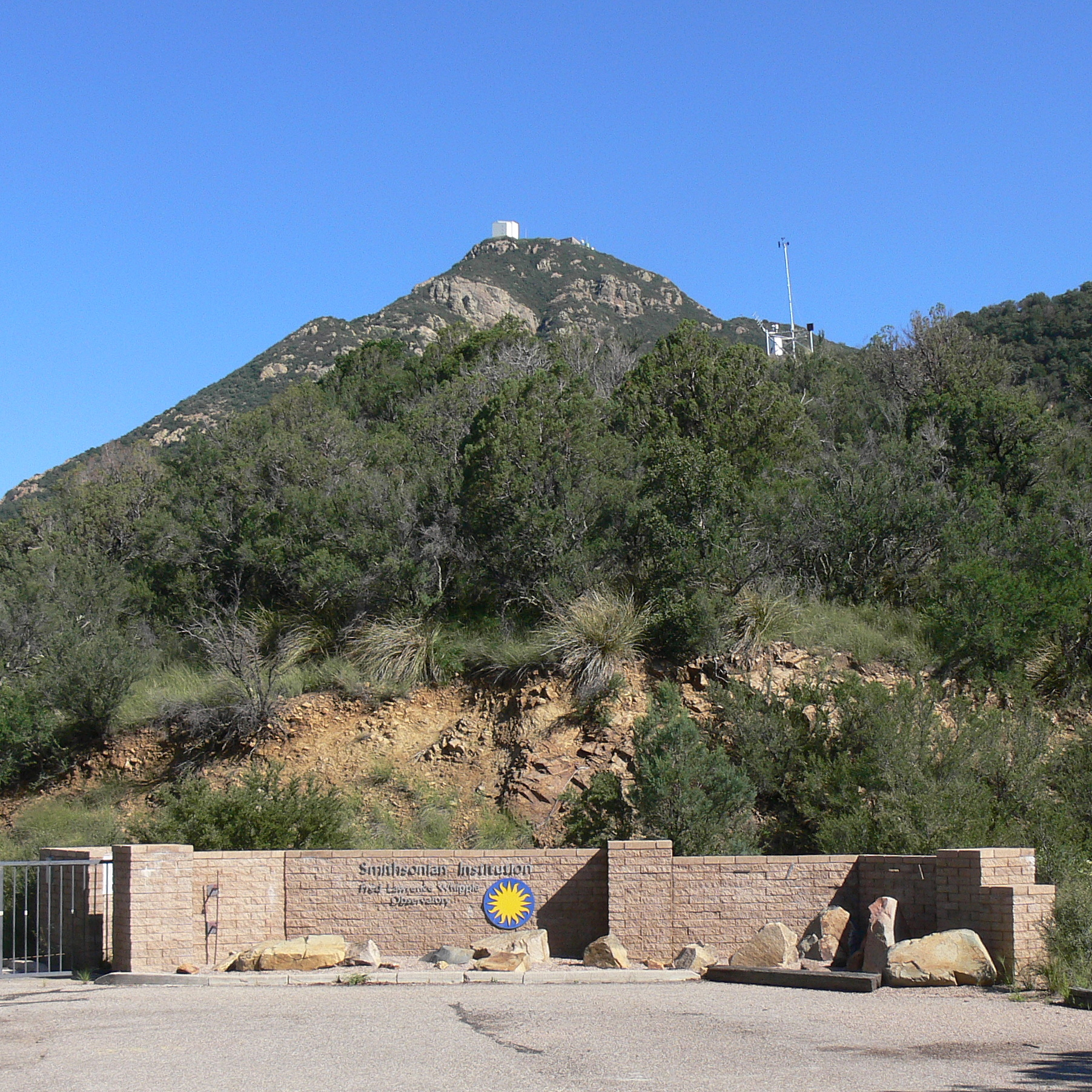
Mount Hopkins and the Smithsonian Observatory, Santa Rita Mountains

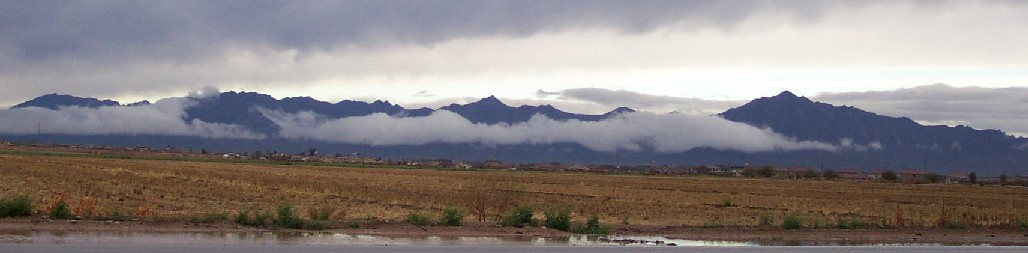
Misty morning in the Sierra Estrella

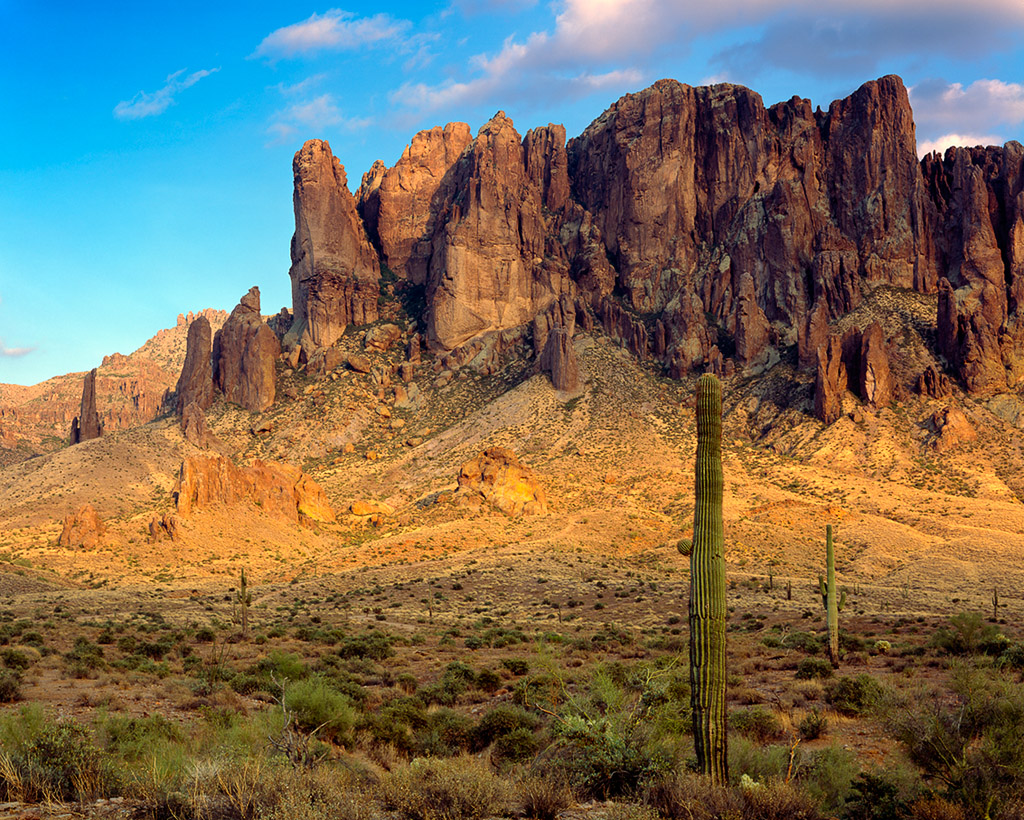
Western Superstition Mountains from Lost Dutchman State Park

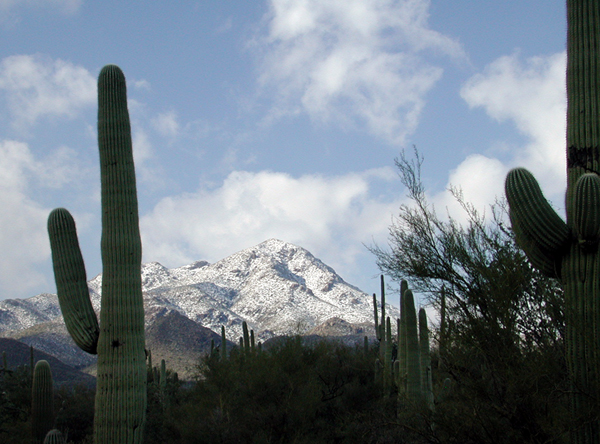
Wasson Peak in the Tucson Mountains

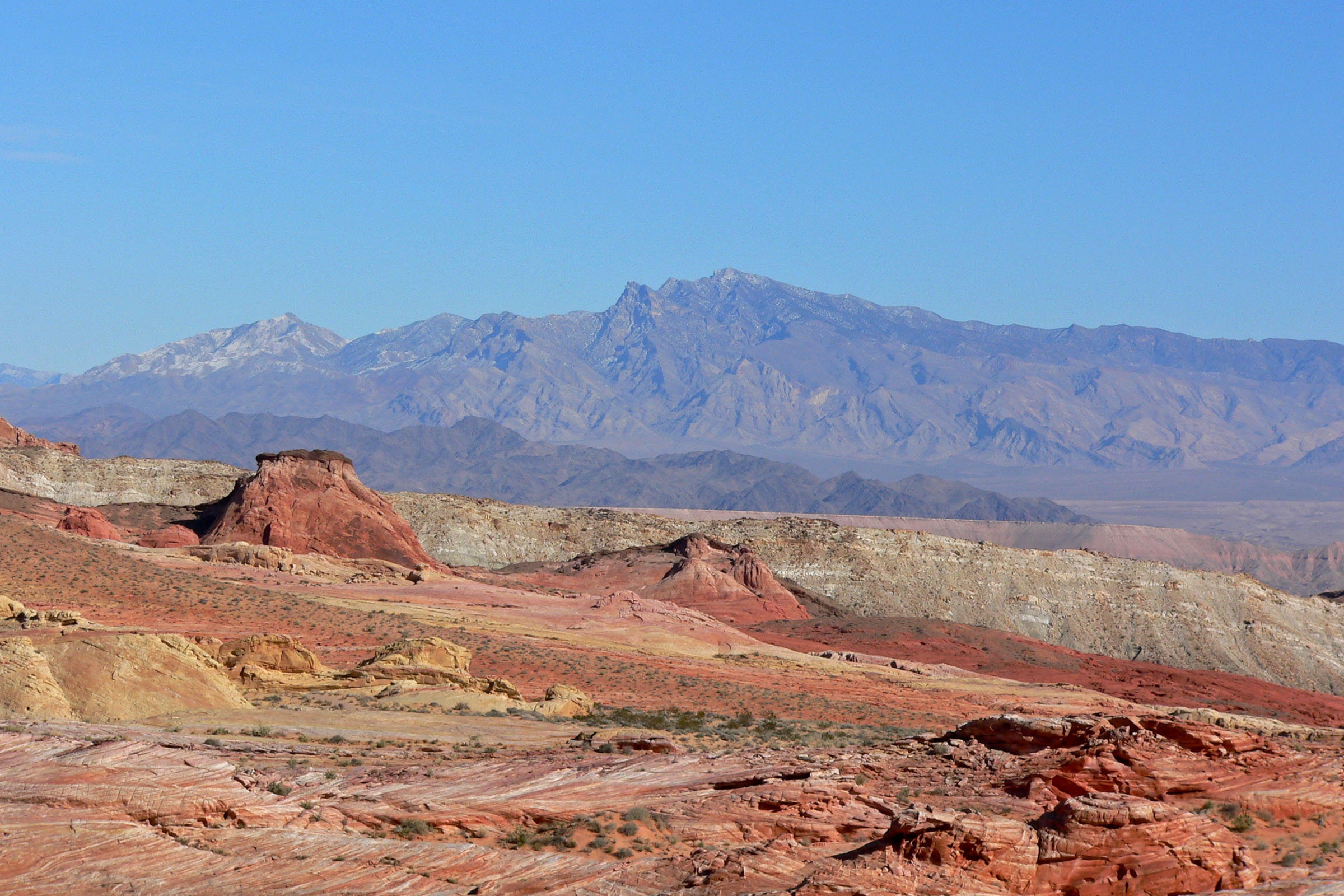
Virgin Mountains from Valley of Fire State Park

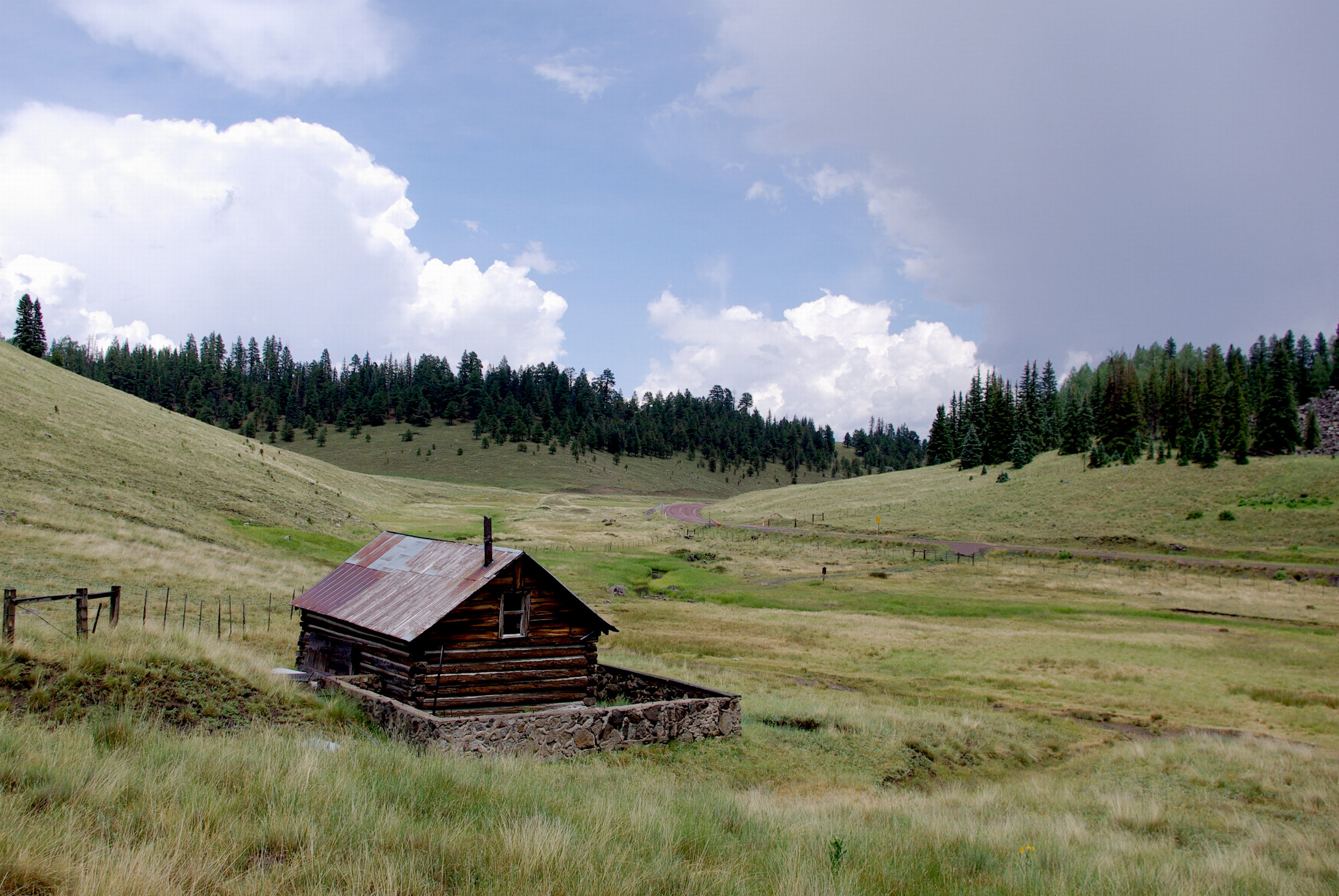
Meadow & cabin near Big Lake, White Mountains (Arizona)

1. Agua Caliente Mountains–Yuma County and Maricopa County
2. Agua Dulce Mountains–Pima County
3. Aguila Mountains–Yuma County
4. Ajo Range–Pima County
5. Alvarez Mountains–Pima County
6. Aquarius Mountains–Mohave County
7. Artesa Mountains–Pima County
8. Artillery Mountains–Mohave County
9. Atascosa Mountains–Santa Cruz County
10. Aubrey Hills–Mohave County
11. Baboquivari Mountains–Pima County
12. Batamote Mountains–Pima County
13. Bates Mountains–Pima County
14. Beaver Dam Mountains–Mohave County
15. Belmont Mountains–Maricopa County
16. Big Horn Mountains (Arizona)–Maricopa County
17. Big Lue Mountains–Greenlee County
18. Bill Williams Mountains–Mohave County
19. Black Hills (Greenlee County)–Greenlee County
20. Black Hills (Yavapai County)–Yavapai County
21. Black Mesa (Arizona) -- (E. Navajo County & W. Apache County)
22. Black Mountains (Arizona)–Mohave County
23. Black Mountains (Yavapai County)–Yavapai County-(southwest county)
24. Blackjack Mountains (Arizona)–Gila County
25. Bradshaw Mountains–Yavapai County
26. Brownell Mountains–Pima County
27. Bryan Mountains–Yuma County
28. Buck Mountains–Mohave County
29. Buckhorn Mountains–Yavapai County
30. Buckskin Mountains (Arizona)–La Paz County
31. Buckskin Mountains (Arizona-Utah)–Coconino County -- (S. Kane County, Utah)
32. Butler Mountains–Yuma County
33. Cabeza Prieta Mountains–Yuma County
34. Camelback Mountain– Maricopa County
35. Canelo Hills–Santa Cruz County
36. Carrizo Mountains–Apache County
37. Casa Grande Mountains–Pinal County
38. Castle Mountains–Pima County
39. Castle Dome Mountains–Yuma County
40. Cerbat Mountains–Mohave County
41. Cerro Colorado Mountains–Pima County
42. Chiricahua Mountains–Cochise County
43. Chocolate Mountains (Arizona)–La Paz County
44. Chuska Mountains–Apache County
45. Cimarron Mountains–Pima County
46. Connell Mountains–Yavapai County
47. Copper Mountains–Yuma County
48. Cottonwood Mountains–Mohave County
49. Coyote Mountains (Arizona)–Pima County
50. Crater Range–Maricopa County
51. Crooked Mountains–Pima County
52. Date Creek Mountains–Yavapai County
53. Diablo Mountains (Arizona)–Pima County
54. Dome Rock Mountains–La Paz County
55. Dos Cabezas Mountains–Cochise County
56. Dragoon Mountains–Cochise County
57. Dripping Spring Mountains–Pinal County
58. Eagletail Mountains–Maricopa County
59. Empire Mountains–Pima County
60. Gakolik Mountains–Pima County
61. Galiuro Mountains–Graham County -- (SE. Pinal County)
62. Gila Bend Mountains–Maricopa County
63. Gila Mountains (Graham County)–Graham County
64. Gila Mountains (Yuma County)–Yuma County
65. Goldfield Mountains–Maricopa County
66. Granite Mountains (Arizona)–Pima County–see also: Granite Mountain (Arizona)-(Yavapai County)
  a separate "Granite Mountain" is in s. La Paz County
67. Granite Wash Mountains–La Paz County
68. Grayback Mountains–Yavapai County
69. Growler Mountains–Pima County
70. Guadalupe Mountains (Hidalgo County)–Hidalgo County, NM - (Cochise County, AZ & Sonora, Mexico)
71. Harcuvar Mountains–NE. La Paz County -- (SW. Yavapai County)
72. Harquahala Mountains–E. La Paz County -- (W. Maricopa County)
73. Hayes Mountains–Gila County
74. Hieroglyphic Mountains–N. Maricopa County -- (some in S. Yavapai County)
75. Hobble Mountains–Coconino County
76. Huachuca Mountains–Cochise County
77. Hualapai Mountains–Mohave County
78. John the Baptist Mountains–Pima County
79. Juniper Mountains–Yavapai County
80. Kofa Mountains–N. Yuma County - (S. La Paz County)
81. La Lesna Mountains–Pima County
82. Laguna Mountains (Arizona)–Yuma County (see also: Laguna Mountains(Calif))
83. Las Guijas Mountains–Pima County
84. Little Ajo Mountains–Pima County
85. Little Buckskin Mountains–La Paz County
86. Little Dragoon Mountains–Cochise County
87. Little Harquahala Mountains–La Paz County
88. Little Horn Mountains–S. La Paz County -- (N. Yuma County)
89. Little Rincon Mountains–Cochise County
90. Lukachukai Mountains–Apache County
91. Maricopa Mountains–Maricopa County
92. Mazatzal Mountains–Southeast Yavapai County -- (and N. Maricopa County, W. Gila County)
93. McAllister Range–Yavapai County
94. McCloud Mountains–Yavapai County
95. McCracken Mountains–Mohave County
96. McDowell Mountains–Maricopa County
97. Mescal Mountains–Gila County
98. Mesquite Mountains–Pima County
99. Middle Mountains–S. La Paz County -- (N. Yuma County)
100. Mineral Mountains, Arizona–Pinal County
101. Mingus Mountain, (= "Black Hills")–Yavapai County
102. Moccasin Mountains–Mohave County -- (S. Kane County, Utah)
103. Mohave Mountains–Mohave County
104. Mohawk Mountains–Yuma County
105. Mohon Mountains–Yavapai County
106. Moquith Mountains–Mohave County
107. Muggins Mountains–Yuma County
108. Mule Mountains–Cochise County
109. Music Mountains–Mohave County
110. Mustang Mountains–Santa Cruz County
111. Navajo Mountain, Arizona–Coconino County (mostly in Utah)
112. Natanes Mountains–Graham County
113. New River Mountains–Yavapai County & Maricopa County
114. New Water Mountains–S. La Paz County -- (connected to Kofa Mountains, N. Yuma County)
115. North Comobabi Mountains–Pima County
116. Painted Rock Mountains–Maricopa Count
117. Pajarito Mountains–Santa Cruz County
118. Palo Verde Mountains–Pinal County
119. Palomas Mountains–Yuma County
120. Patagonia Mountains–Santa Cruz County
121. Peacock Mountains–Mohave County
122. Pedrogosa Mountains–Cochise County
123. Peloncillo Mountains (Cochise County)–NE. Cochise County -- (SE. Graham County, S. Greenlee County)
  See also Peloncillo Mountains (Hidalgo County), New Mexico, also a Madrean Sky Island
124. Perilla Mountains–Cochise County
125. Phoenix Mountains–Maricopa County
126. Picacho Mountains–Pinal County
127. Pinal Mountains–Gila County
128. Pinaleno Mountains–Graham County
129. Plomosa Mountains–La Paz County
130. Poachie Range–SE. Mohave County -- (SW. Yavapai County, NE. La Paz County)
131. Pozo Redondo Mountains–Pima County
132. Pozo Verde Mountains–Pima County
133. Puerto Blanco Mountains–Pima County
134. Quijotoa Mountains–Pima County
135. Quinlan Mountains–Pima County
136. Rawhide Mountains–Mohave County
137. Rincon Mountains–Pima County
138. Roskruge Mountains–Pima County
139. Sacaton Mountains–Pinal County
140. Salt River Mountains
141. Salt River Mountains (Gila County)–Gila County
142. San Cayetano Mountains–Santa Cruz County
143. San Francisco Mountains–Greenlee County
144. San Francisco Mountains
145. San Francisco Mountains (New Mexico)–New Mexico & Greenlee County
146. San Francisco Peaks–Coconino County
147. San Luis Mountains–Pima County
148. San Tan Mountains, Arizona
149. Santan Mountains–Pinal County
150. Sand Tank Mountains–Maricopa County
151. Santa Catalina Mountains–Pima County
152. Santa Maria Mountains–Yavapai County
153. Santa Rita Mountains–Santa Cruz County, Pima County
154. Santa Rosa Mountains–Pima County
155. Santa Teresa Mountains–Graham County
156. Sauceda Mountains–Pima County
157. Sawmill Mountains–Mohave County
158. Sawtooth Mountains–Pinal County
159. Sevenmile Mountains, Arizona-Gila County
160. Sheridan Mountains–Pima County
161. Sierra Ancha–Gila County
162. Sierra Arida–Yuma County
163. Sierra Blanca Mountains–Pima County
164. Sierra de la Lechuguilla–Yuma County
165. Sierra de la Nariz–Pima County
166. Sierra de Santa Rosa–Pima County
167. Sierra Estrella–Maricopa County
168. Sierra Madre Occidental–Regional Western Mexico - (extension of individual ranges, along entire United States-Mexico border)
169. Sky island/ Madrean sky islands
170. Sierra Pinta–Yuma County
171. Sierra Prieta–Yavapai County
172. Sierrita Mountains–Pima County
173. Sikort Chuapo Mountains–Pima County
174. Silver Bell Mountains–Pima County
175. Silver Reef Mountains–Pinal County
176. Slate Mountains–Pinal County
177. Sonoyta Mountains–Pima County
178. South Comobabi Mountains–Pima County
179. South Mountains (Arizona)–Maricopa County
180. Suizo Mountains–Pinal County
181. Summit Mountains–E. Greenlee County -- (W. Grant County, New Mexico)
182. Superstition Mountains–Pinal County
183. Swisshelm Mountains–Cochise County
184. Table Top Mountains–Pinal County
185. Tank Mountains–Yuma County
186. Tat Momoli Mountains–Pinal County
187. Tinajas Altas Mountains–Yuma County
188. Tortilla Mountains–Pinal County
189. Tortolita Mountains–Pima County, Pinal County
190. Trigo Mountains–La Paz County
191. Tucson Mountains–Pima County
192. Tule Mountains–Yuma County
193. Tumacacori Mountains–Santa Cruz County, Pima County
194. Tunitcha Mountains–Apache County
195. Uinkaret Mountains–Mohave County
196. Usery Mountains–Maricopa County
197. Vekol Mountains–Pinal County
198. Virgin Mountains–N. Mohave County -- (E. Clark County, Nevada)
199. Vulture Mountains–Maricopa County
200. Waterman Mountains–Pima County
201. Weaver Mountains–Yavapai County
202. West Silver Bell Mountains–Pima County
203. Whetstone Mountains–Cochise County
204. White Mountains (Arizona)–Apache County
205. White Tank Mountains–Maricopa County
206. Whitlock Mountains–Graham County
207. Wickenburg Mountains–Yavapai County
208. Winchester Mountains–N. Cochise County -- (they merge into S. Galiuro Mountains, Graham County)
209. Yon Dot Mountains–Coconino County

== Associated regional landforms ==
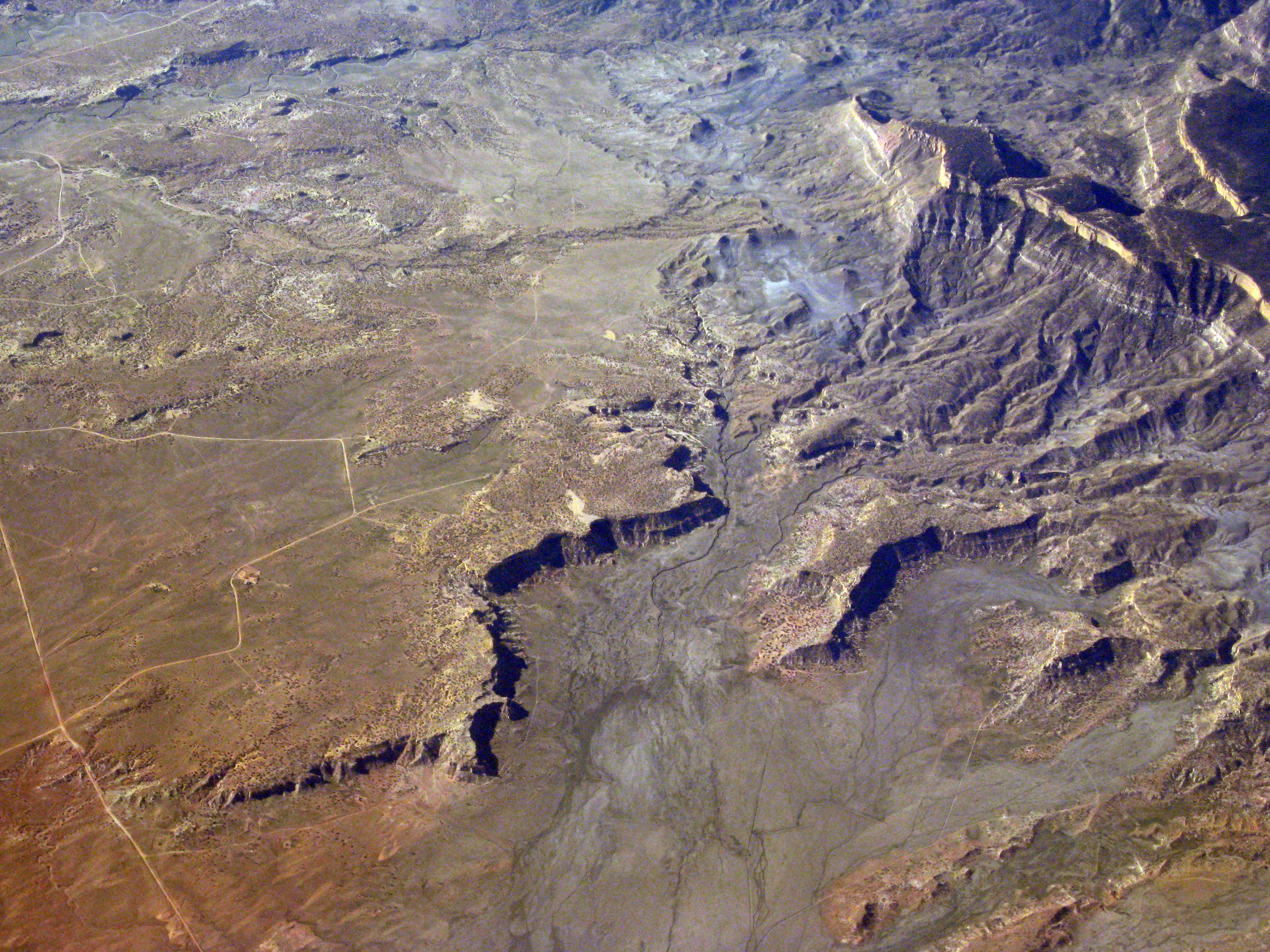
Black Mesa west of Chilchinbito, Arizona.

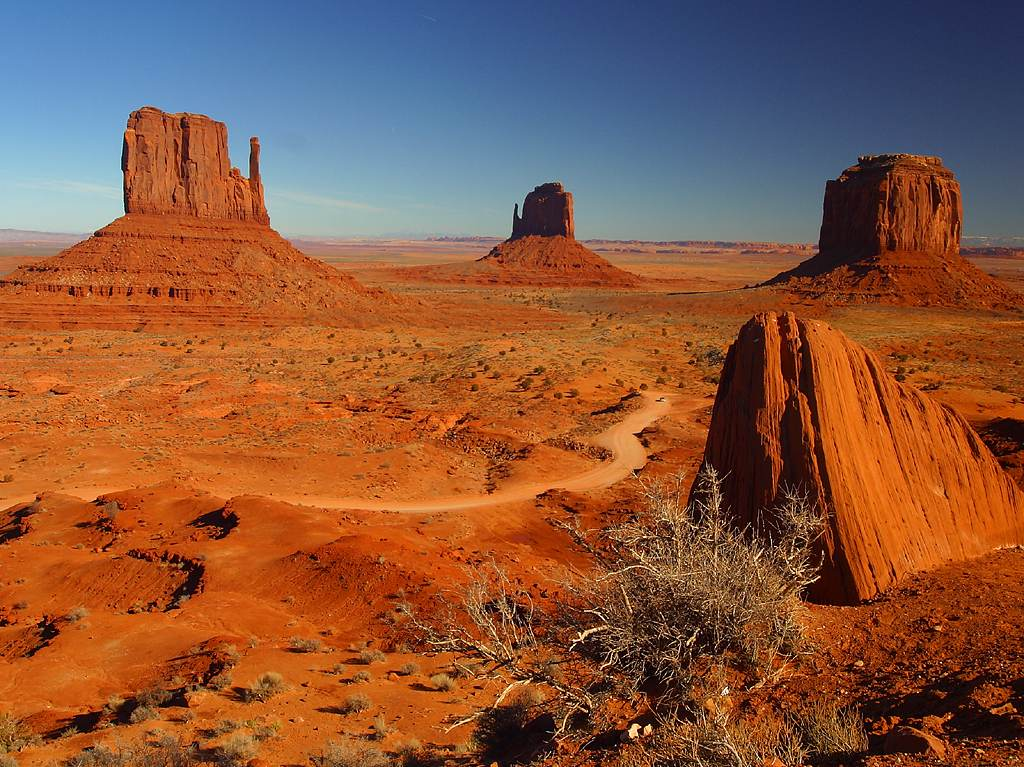
Monument Valley

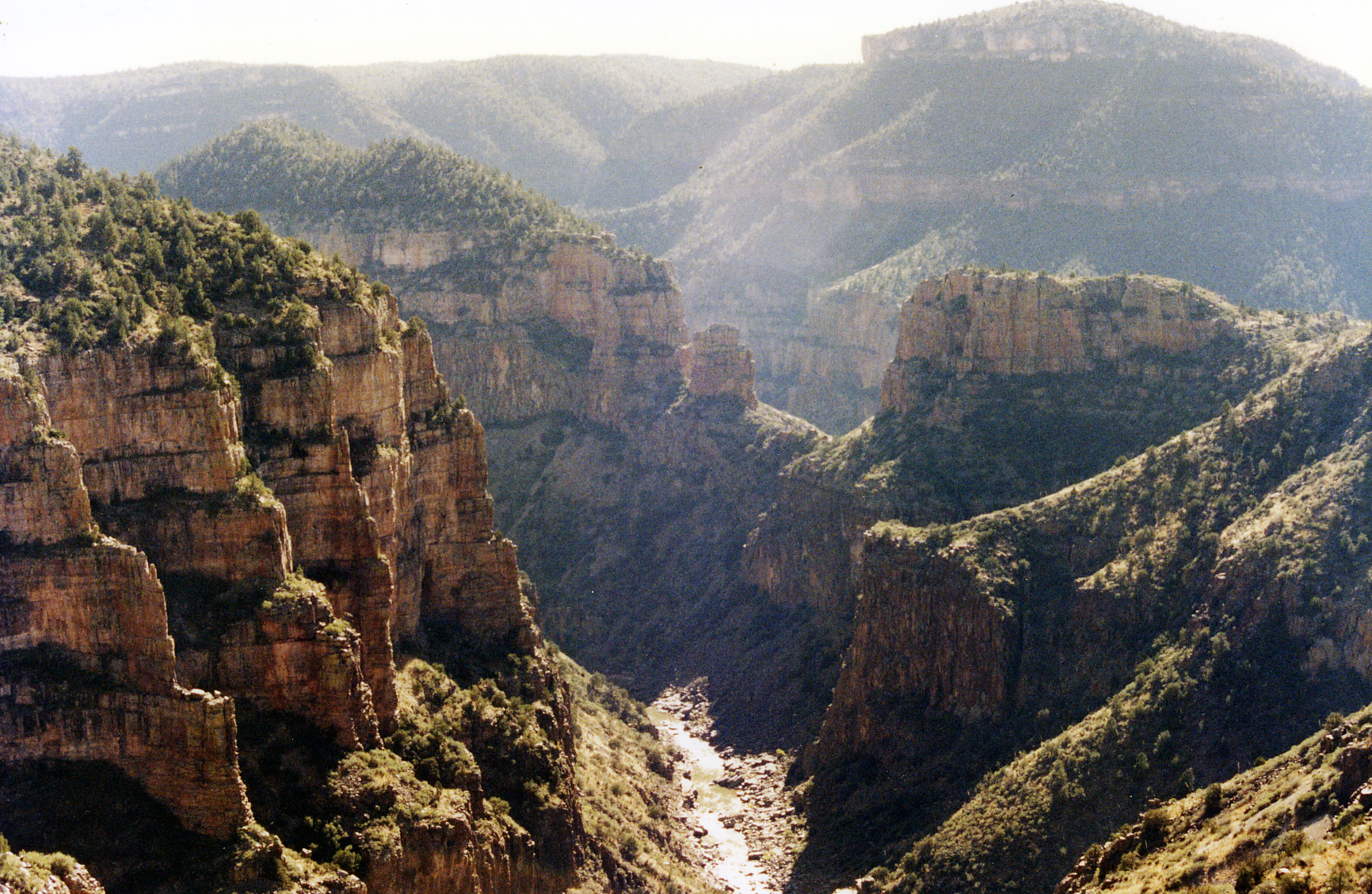
Salt River Canyon

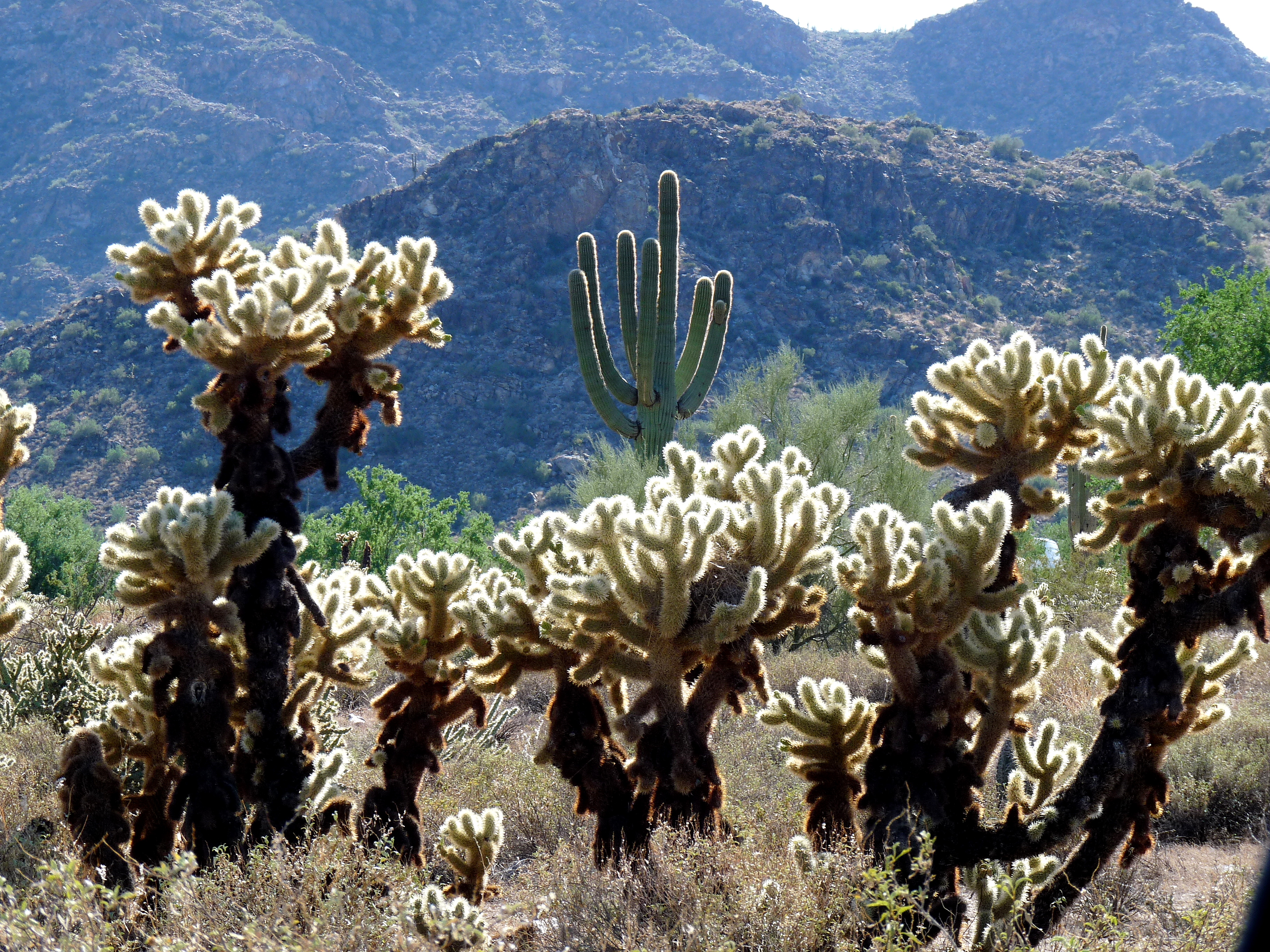
Sonoran Desert plants in the White Tank Mountain Regional Park

- Aguirre Valley
- Altar Valley
- Aubrey Valley
- Avra Valley
- Black Mesa, Big Mountain, Mesa de las Vacas
- Black Mesa (western Arizona), extreme south section: Black Mountains (Arizona)
- Cactus Plain
- Castle Dome Plain
- Chinle Valley
- Chino Valley (Arizona)
- Coconino Plateau
- Defiance Plateau
- Echo Cliffs
- Gila River Valley–from eastern to southwestern Arizona
- Gila Valley (Graham County)
- Gila Valley (Yuma County)
- Grand Canyon
- Grand Wash Cliffs
- Grapevine Mesa
- Growler Valley
- Hualapai Valley
- Hunts Mesa
- Hurricane Cliffs
- Hyder Valley
- Kaibab Plateau
- Kaibito Plateau
- Kanab Plateau
- King Valley (Arizona)
- La Posa Plain
- Lechuguilla Desert
- Lonesome Valley, See: Chino Valley, Arizona, & Prescott Valley, Arizona (townsites)
- Madera Canyon (Arizona)
- Mogollon Plateau
- Mogollon Rim
- Mohawk Valley (Arizona)
- Monument Valley
- Natanes Valley
- Painted Desert, Arizona
- Palomas Plain
- Paradise Butte
- Paria Plateau, See: Paria Canyon-Vermilion Cliffs Wilderness
- Parker Valley
- Quijotoa Valley
- Rainbow Valley (Arizona)
- Ranegras Plain
- Sabino Canyon
- Sacramento Valley (Arizona)
- Salt River Canyon
- San Bernardino Valley (Arizona)
- San Cristobal Valley
- San Pedro Valley (Arizona)
- San Simon Valley
- Santa Rosa Valley
- Sentinel Plain
- Shivwits Plateau
- Shonto Plateau
- Sonoran Desert
- Sonsela Butte
- Sulphur Springs Valley
- Sycamore Canyon
- Tonto Basin
- Tule Desert (Arizona)
- Uinkaret Plateau
- Valley of the Ajo
- Verde Valley
- Vermilion Cliffs
- Whitlock Valley
- Williamson Valley
- Yuma Desert

== Apache County ==
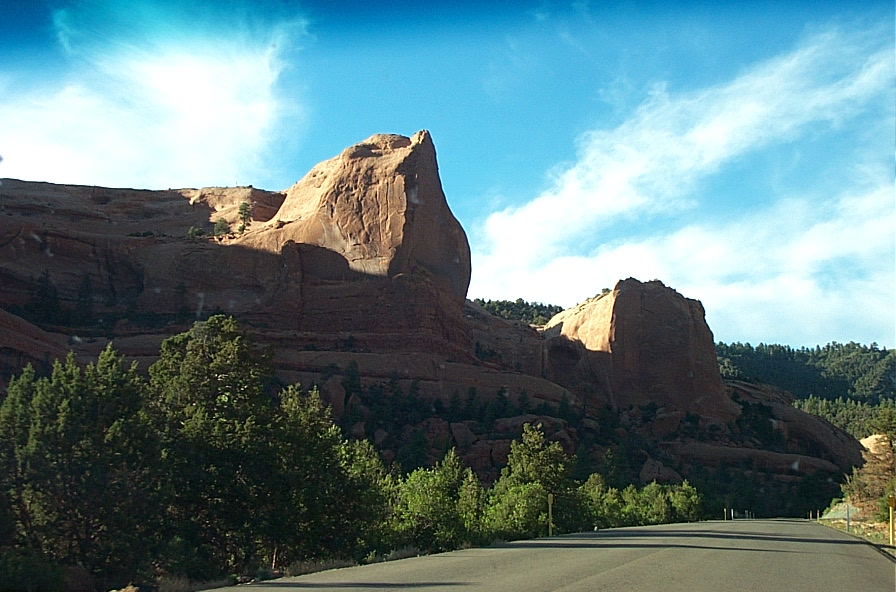
Buffalo Pass, Lukachukai Mountains

- Black Mesa (Arizona) -- (E. Navajo County & W. Apache County)
- Carrizo Mountains–Apache County
- Chuska Mountains–Apache County
- Lukachukai Mountains–Apache County
- Tunitcha Mountains–Apache County
- White Mountains (Arizona)–Apache County

== Cochise County ==
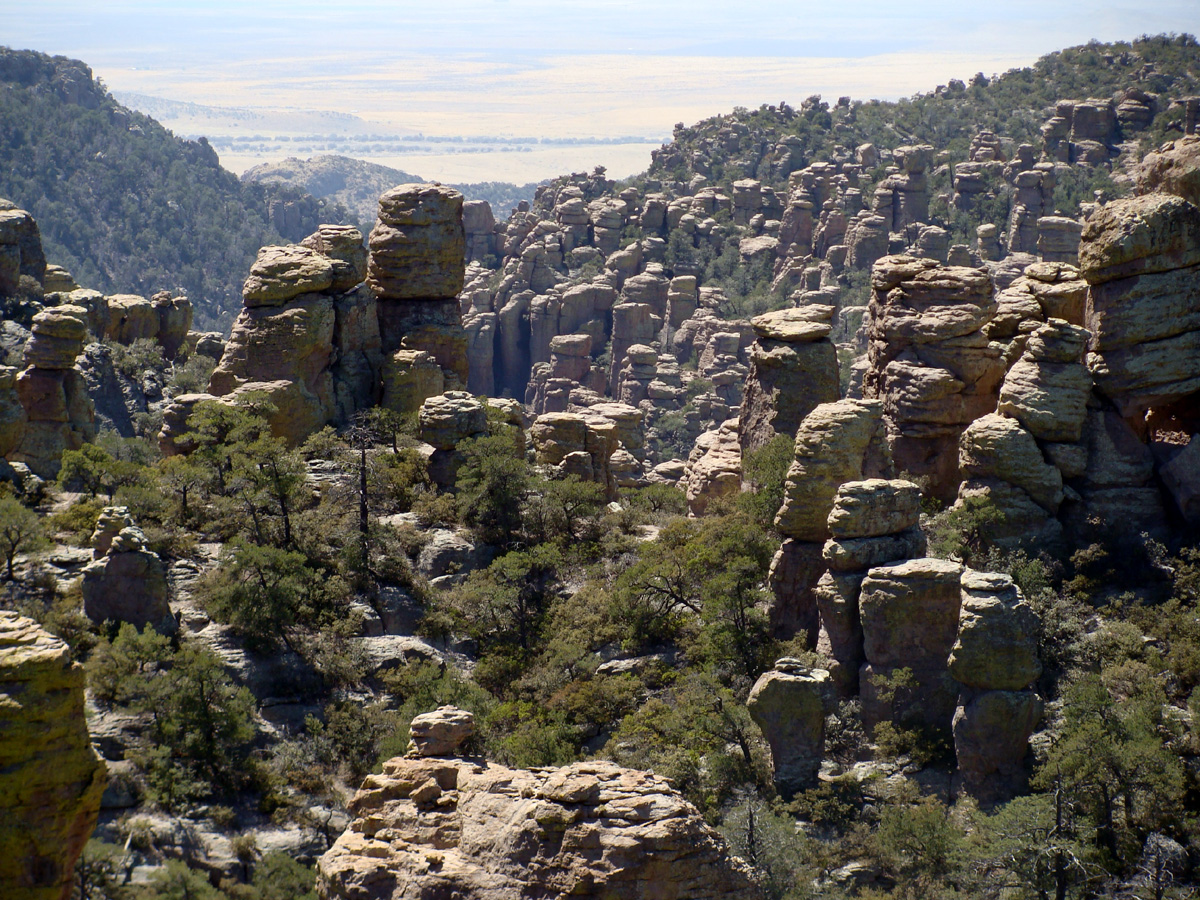
Hoodoos, Chiricahua National Monument

- Chiricahua Mountains–Cochise County
  - Pedrogosa Mountains–Cochise County
  - Swisshelm Mountains–Cochise County
- Dos Cabezas Mountains–Cochise County
- Dragoon Mountains–Cochise County
  - Little Dragoon Mountains–Cochise County
- Guadalupe Mountains (Hidalgo County)–Hidalgo County, NM - (Cochise County, AZ & Sonora, Mexico)
- Huachuca Mountains–Cochise County
- Little Rincon Mountains–Cochise County
  - ( Rincon Mountains–Pima County )
- Mule Mountains–Cochise County
- Peloncillo Mountains (Cochise County)–NE. Cochise County -- (SE. Graham County, S. Greenlee County)
  See also Peloncillo Mountains (Hidalgo County), New Mexico, also a Madrean Sky Island
- Perilla Mountains–Cochise County
- Whetstone Mountains–Cochise County
- Winchester Mountains–N. Cochise County -- (they merge into S. Galiuro Mountains, Graham County)

== Coconino County ==
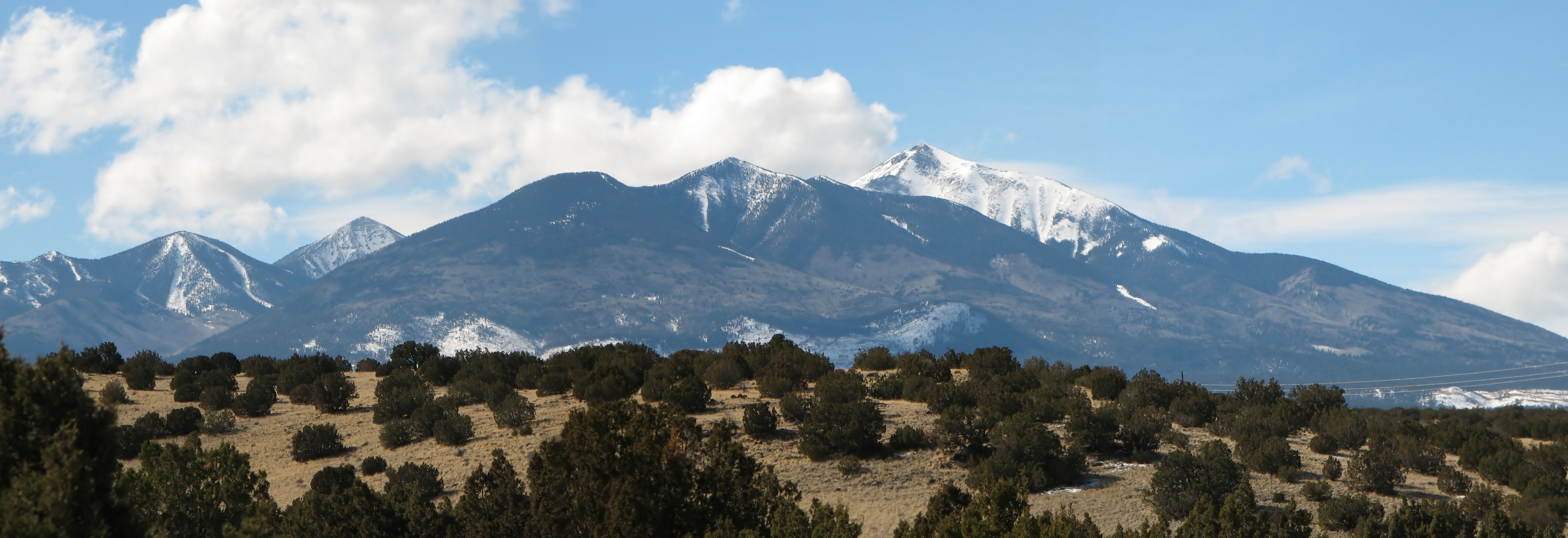
San Francisco Peaks from the east

- Buckskin Mountains (Arizona-Utah)–Coconino County -- (S. Kane County, Utah)
- Hobble Mountains–Coconino County
- San Francisco Peaks–Coconino County
- Yon Dot Mountains–Coconino County

== Gila County ==
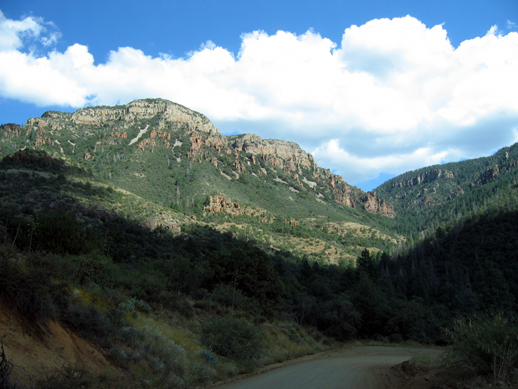
Sierra Ancha mountains

- Blackjack Mountains (Arizona)–Gila County
- Hayes Mountains–Gila County
- ( Mazatzal Mountains–Southeast Yavapai County -- (and N. Maricopa County, W. Gila County) )
- Mescal Mountains–Gila County
- Pinal Mountains–Gila County
- Salt River Mountains (Gila County)–Gila County
- Sevenmile Mountains–Gila County
- Sierra Ancha–Gila County

== Graham County ==
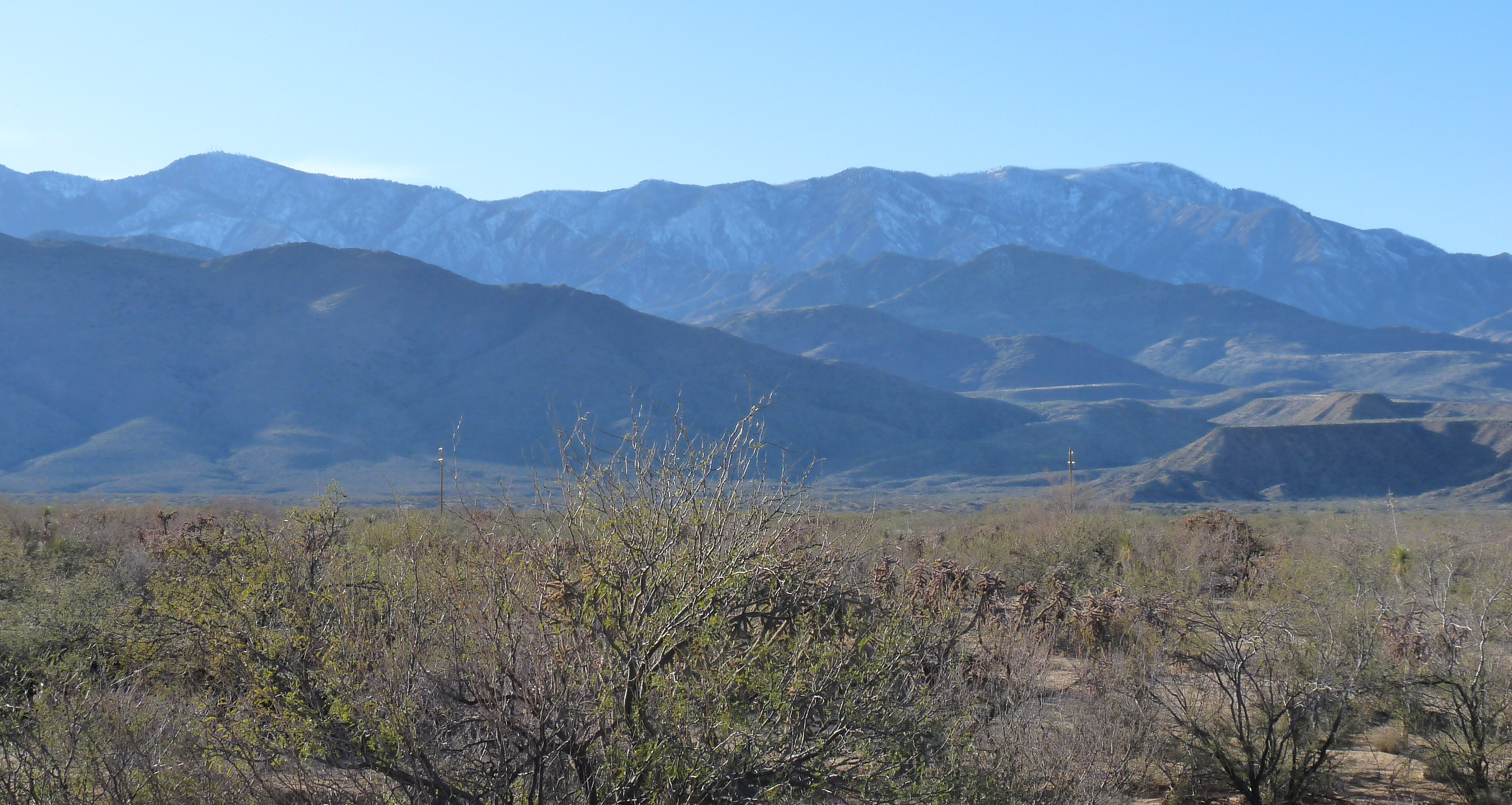
Pinaleno Mountains from the west

- Galiuro Mountains–Graham County -- (SE. Pinal County)
  - Winchester Mountains–N. Cochise County -- (they merge into S. Galiuro Mountains, Graham County)
- Gila Mountains (Graham County)–Graham County
  - ( Gila Mountains (Yuma County)–Yuma County )
- Natanes Mountains–Graham County
- Peloncillo Mountains (Cochise County)–NE. Cochise County -- (SE. Graham County, S. Greenlee County)
  See also Peloncillo Mountains (Hidalgo County), New Mexico, also a Madrean Sky Island
- Pinaleno Mountains–Graham County
- Santa Teresa Mountains–Graham County
- Whitlock Mountains–Graham County

== Greenlee County ==
- Big Lue Mountains–Greenlee County
- Black Hills (Greenlee County)–Greenlee County
  - ( Black Hills (Yavapai County)–Yavapai County )
- Peloncillo Mountains (Cochise County)–NE. Cochise County -- (SE. Graham County, S. Greenlee County)
  See also Peloncillo Mountains (Hidalgo County), New Mexico, also a Madrean Sky Island
- San Francisco Mountains (New Mexico)–New Mexico & Greenlee County
- Summit Mountains–E. Greenlee County -- (W. Grant County, New Mexico)

== La Paz County ==
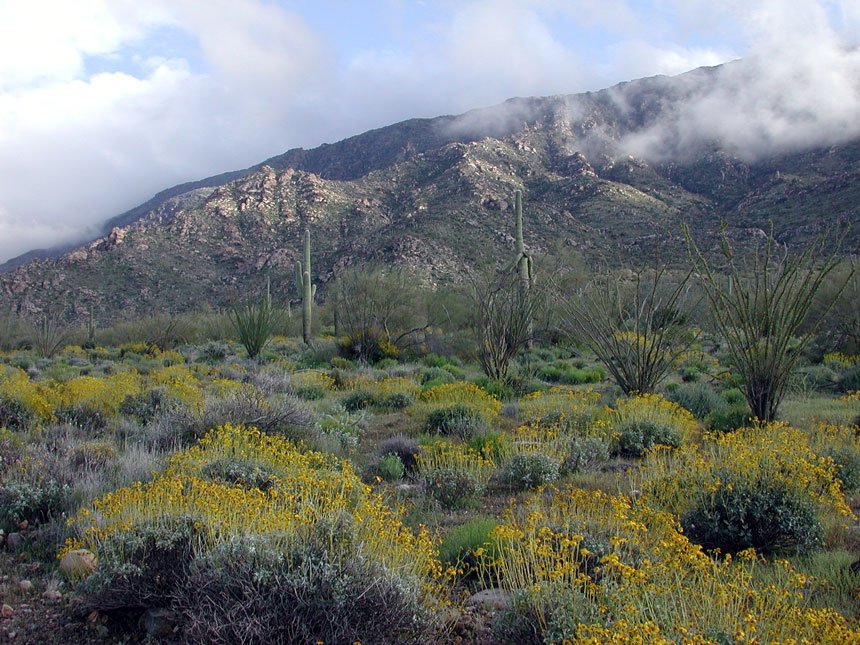
Harquahala Mountains, March 2005

- Buckskin Mountains (Arizona)–La Paz County
- Chocolate Mountains (Arizona)–La Paz County
- Dome Rock Mountains–La Paz County
- Granite Wash Mountains–La Paz County
- Harcuvar Mountains–NE. La Paz County -- (SW. Yavapai County)
- Harquahala Mountains–E. La Paz County -- (W. Maricopa County)
- (Kofa Mountains–N. Yuma County - (S. La Paz County) )
- Little Buckskin Mountains–La Paz County
- Little Harquahala Mountains–La Paz County
  - Harquahala Mountains–E. La Paz County -- (W. Maricopa County)
- Little Horn Mountains–La Paz County
- Middle Mountains–S. La Paz County -- (N. Yuma County)
- New Water Mountains–La Paz County
- Plomosa Mountains–La Paz County
- ( Poachie Range–SE. Mohave County -- (SW. Yavapai County, NE. La Paz County) )
- Trigo Mountains–La Paz County

== Maricopa County ==
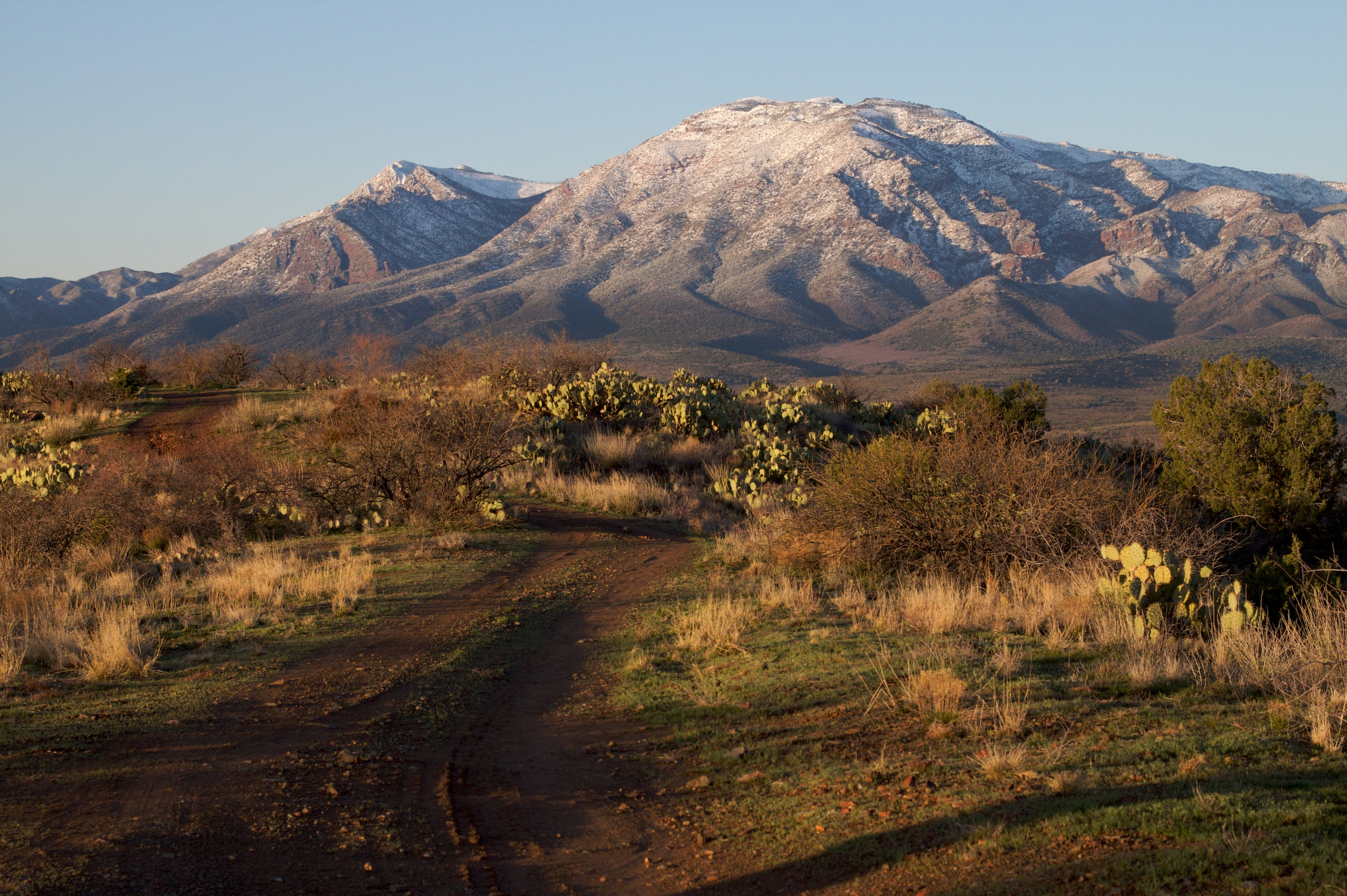
Mazatzal Mountains viewed from the east, March 2010

- Agua Caliente Mountains–Yuma County and Maricopa County
- Belmont Mountains–Maricopa County
- Big Horn Mountains (Arizona)–Maricopa County
- Crater Range–Maricopa County
  - Camelback Mountain– Maricopa County
- Eagletail Mountains–Maricopa County
- Gila Bend Mountains–Maricopa County
- Goldfield Mountains–Maricopa County
- Harquahala Mountains–E. La Paz County -- (W. Maricopa County)
  - Little Harquahala Mountains–La Paz County
- Hieroglyphic Mountains–Maricopa County -- (some in S. Yavapai County)
- Maricopa Mountains–Maricopa County
- Mazatzal Mountains–Southeast Yavapai County -- (and N. Maricopa, W. Gila County) )
- Four Peaks– Maricopa County
- McDowell Mountains–Maricopa County
- New River Mountains–Yavapai County & Maricopa County
- Painted Rock Mountains–Maricopa County
- Phoenix Mountains–Maricopa County
- Sand Tank Mountains–Maricopa County
- Sierra Estrella–Maricopa County
- Salt River Mountains–Maricopa County
- Usery Mountains–Maricopa County -- (See: Usery Mountain Recreation Area.)
- Vulture Mountains–Maricopa County
- White Tank Mountains–Maricopa County
- Shanagold Peaks–Maricopa County

== Mohave County ==
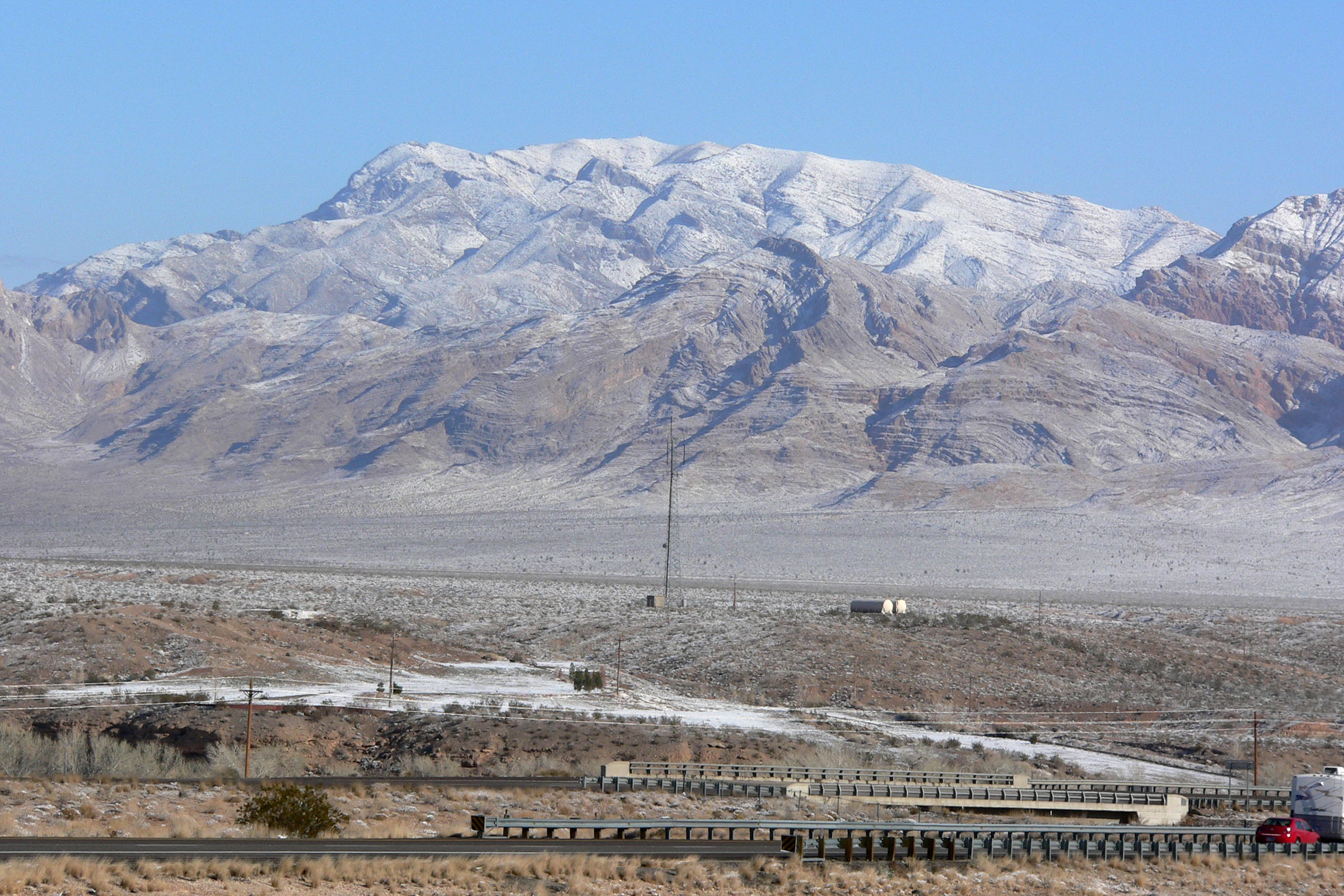
Beaver Dam Mountains, January 2007

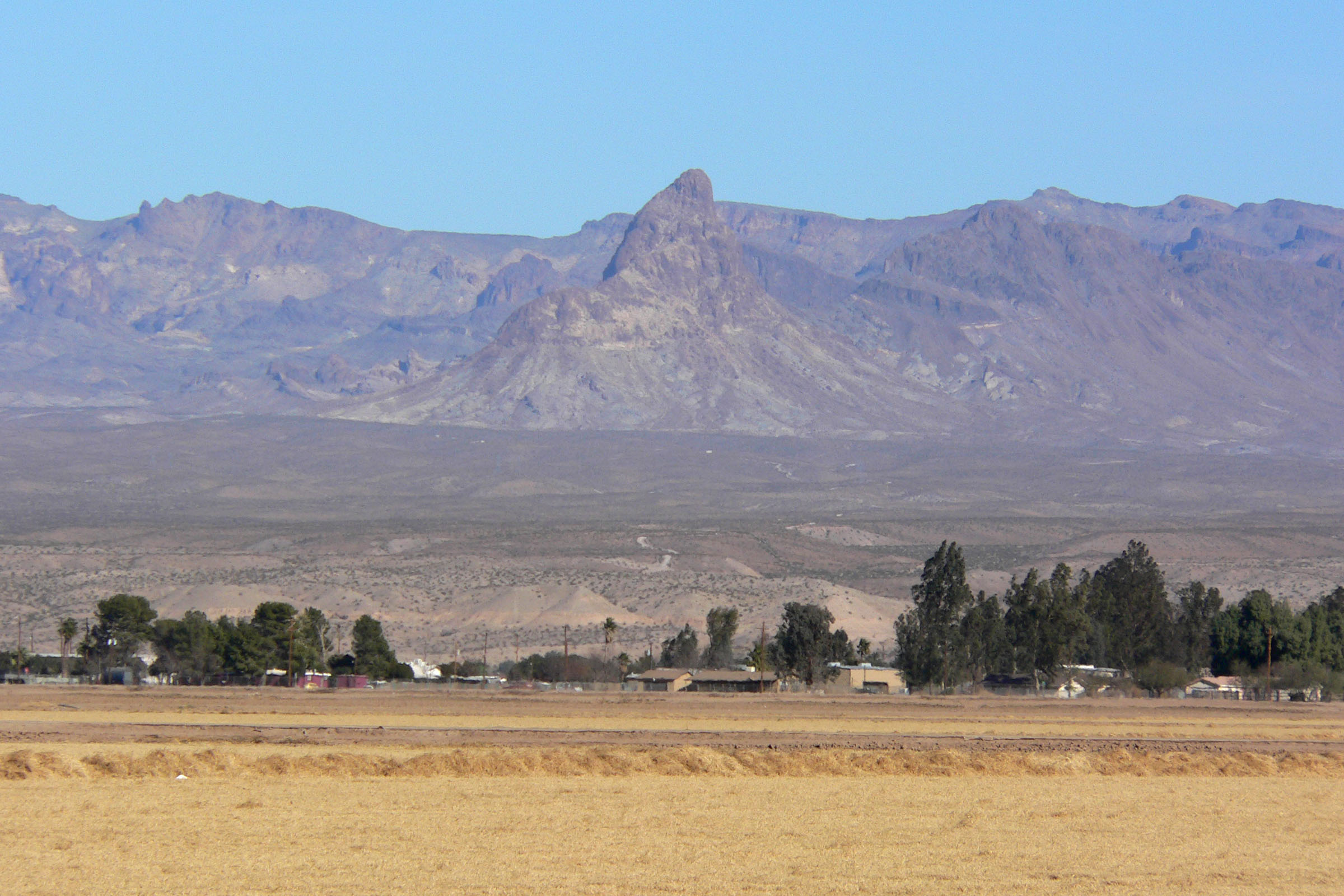
Boundary Cone and the Black Mountains (Arizona), viewed from about ~due-west (from Mohave Valley, in Lower Colorado River Valley)

- Aquarius Mountains–Mohave County
- Artillery Mountains–Mohave County
- Aubrey Hills–Mohave County
- ( Beaver Dam Mountains–S. Washington County, Utah -- (N. Mohave County--Arizona Strip) )
- Bill Williams Mountains–Mohave County
- Black Mountains (Arizona)–Mohave County
- Buck Mountains–Mohave County
- Cerbat Mountains–Mohave County
- Cottonwood Mountains–Mohave County
- Hualapai Mountains–Mohave County
- McCracken Mountains–Mohave County
- Moccasin Mountains–Mohave County -- (S. Kane County, Utah)
- Mohave Mountains–Mohave County
- Moquith Mountains–Mohave County
- Music Mountains–Mohave County
- Peacock Mountains–Mohave County
- Poachie Range–E. Mohave County -- (W. Yavapai County)
- Rawhide Mountains–Mohave County
- Sawmill Mountains–Mohave County
- Uinkaret Mountains–Mohave County
- Virgin Mountains–N. Mohave County -- (E. Clark County, Nevada)

== Navajo County ==
Agathla Peak

- Agathla Peak–Navajo County
- Black Mesa (Arizona) -- (E. Navajo County & W. Apache County)

== Pima County ==
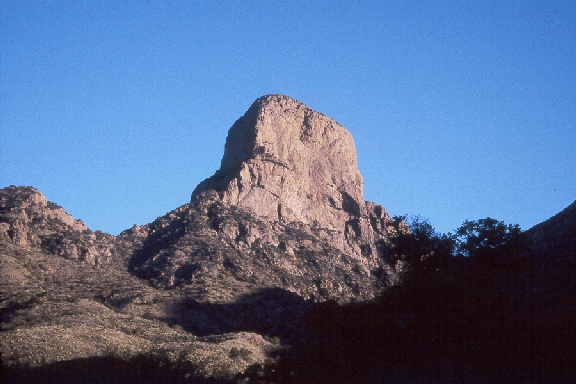
East face of Baboquivari Peak

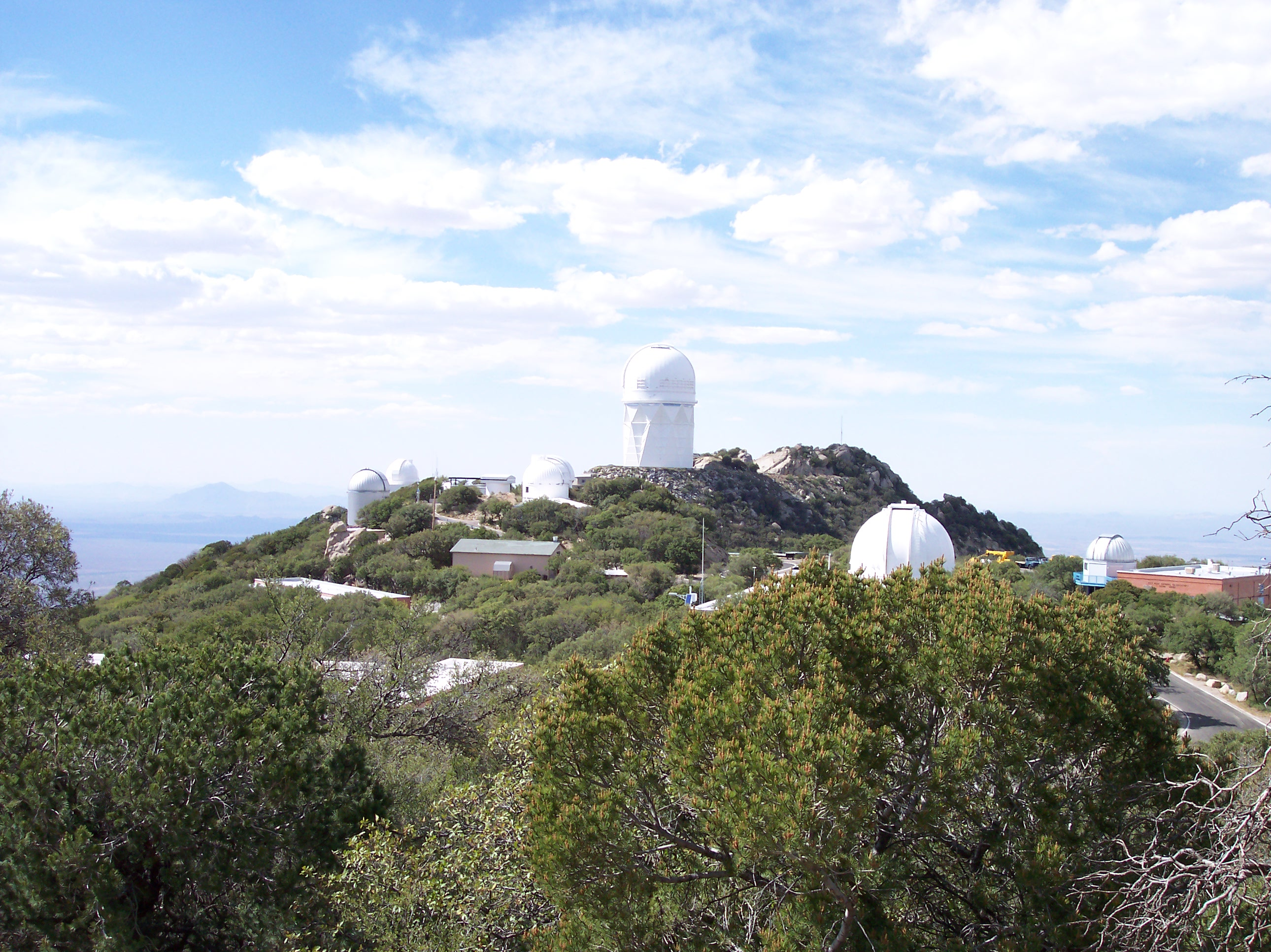
Kitt Peak, the highpoint of the Quinlan Mountains, and the Kitt Peak National Observatory

- Agua Dulce Mountains–Pima County
- Ajo Range–Pima County
- Alvarez Mountains–Pima County
- Artesa Mountains–Pima County
- Baboquivari Mountains (Arizona)–Pima County; See: Baboquivari Peak Wilderness
- Batamote Mountains–Pima County
- Bates Mountains–Pima County
- Brownell Mountains–Pima County
- Castle Mountains (Arizona)–Pima County
- Cerro Colorado Mountains–Pima County
- Cimarron Mountains–Pima County
- Coyote Mountains (Arizona)–Pima County
- Crooked Mountains–Pima County
- Diablo Mountains (Arizona)–Pima County
- Empire Mountains–Pima County
- Gakolik Mountains–Pima County
- Granite Mountains (Arizona)–Pima County–see also: Granite Mountain (Arizona)-(Yavapai County)
  a separate "Granite Mountain" is in s. La Paz County
- Growler Mountains–Pima County
- John the Baptist Mountains–Pima County
- La Lesna Mountains–Pima County
- Las Guijas Mountains–Pima County
- Little Ajo Mountains–Pima County
- Mesquite Mountains–Pima County
- North Comobabi Mountains–Pima County
- Pozo Redondo Mountains–Pima County
- Pozo Verde Mountains–Pima County
- Puerto Blanco Mountains–Pima County
- Quijotoa Mountains–Pima County
- Quinlan Mountains–Pima County – highest point is Kitt Peak
- Rincon Mountains–Pima County
  - ( Little Rincon Mountains–Cochise County )
- Roskruge Mountains–Pima County
- San Luis Mountains–Pima County
- Santa Catalina Mountains–Pima County
- Santa Rita Mountains–Santa Cruz County, Pima County
- Santa Rosa Mountains (Arizona)–Pima County
- Sauceda Mountains–Pima County
- Sheridan Mountains–Pima County
- Sierra Blanca Mountains–Pima County
- Sierra de la Nariz–Pima County
- Sierra de Santa Rosa–Pima County
- Sierrita Mountains–Pima County
- Sikort Chuapo Mountains–Pima County
- Silver Bell Mountains–Pima County
  - West Silver Bell Mountains–Pima County & Pinal County
- Sonoyta Mountains–Pima County
- South Comobabi Mountains–Pima County
- Tortolita Mountains–Pima County, Pinal County
- Tucson Mountains–Pima County
- Tumacacori Mountains–Santa Cruz County, Pima County
- Waterman Mountains–Pima County
- West Silver Bell Mountains–Pima County & Pinal County
  - Silver Bell Mountains–Pima County

== Pinal County ==
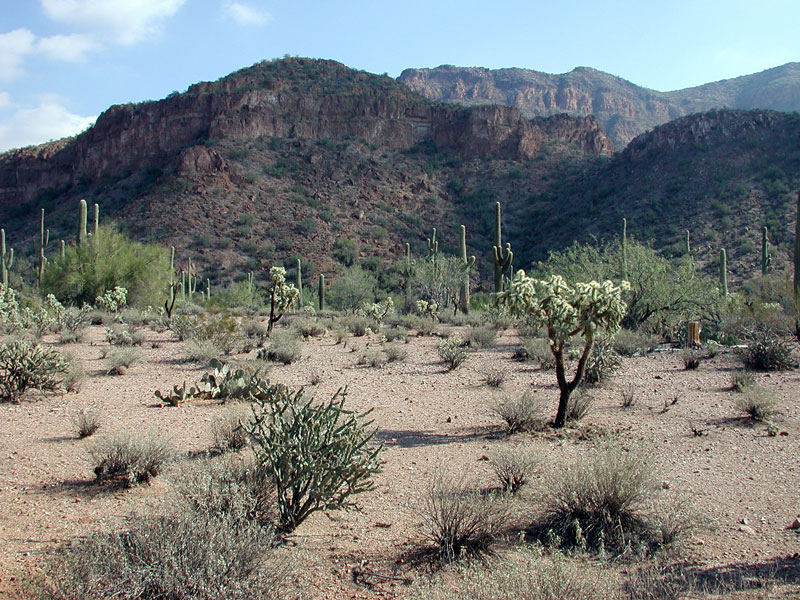
Mineral Mountains, Arizona

- Casa Grande Mountains–Pinal County
- Dripping Spring Mountains–Pinal County
- Galiuro Mountains–Graham County -- (SE. Pinal County)
- Mineral Mountains, Arizona–Pinal County
- Palo Verde Mountains–Pinal County
- Picacho Mountains–Pinal County
- Sacaton Mountains–Pinal County
- San Tan Mountains, Arizona
  - Santan Mountains–Pinal County
- Sawtooth Mountains–Pinal County
- Silver Reef Mountains–Pinal County
- Slate Mountains–Pinal County
- Suizo Mountains–Pinal County
- Superstition Mountains–Pinal County
- Table Top Mountains–Pinal County
- Tat Momoli Mountains–Pinal County
- Tortilla Mountains–Pinal County
- Tortolita Mountains–Pima County, Pinal County
- Vekol Mountains–Pinal County
- West Silver Bell Mountains–Pima County & Pinal County
  - ( Silver Bell Mountains–Pima County )

== Santa Cruz County ==
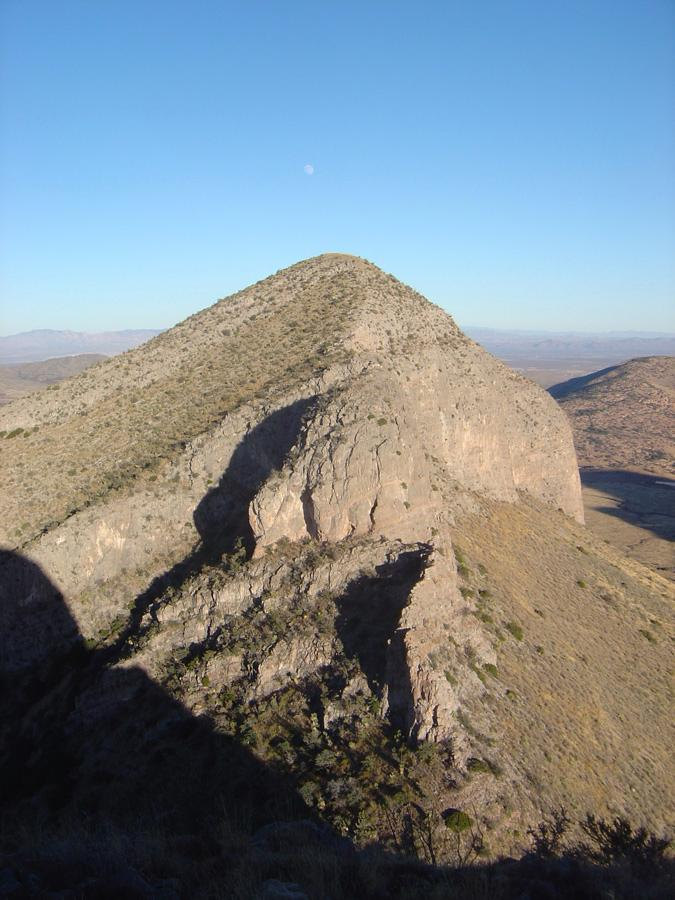
Mustang Mountains

- Atascosa Mountains–Santa Cruz County
- Canelo Hills–Santa Cruz County, Cochise County
- Mustang Mountains–Santa Cruz County
- Pajarito Mountains–Santa Cruz County
- Patagonia Mountains–Santa Cruz County
- San Cayetano Mountains–Santa Cruz County
- Santa Rita Mountains–Santa Cruz County, Pima County
- Tumacacori Mountains–Santa Cruz County, Pima County

== Yavapai County ==
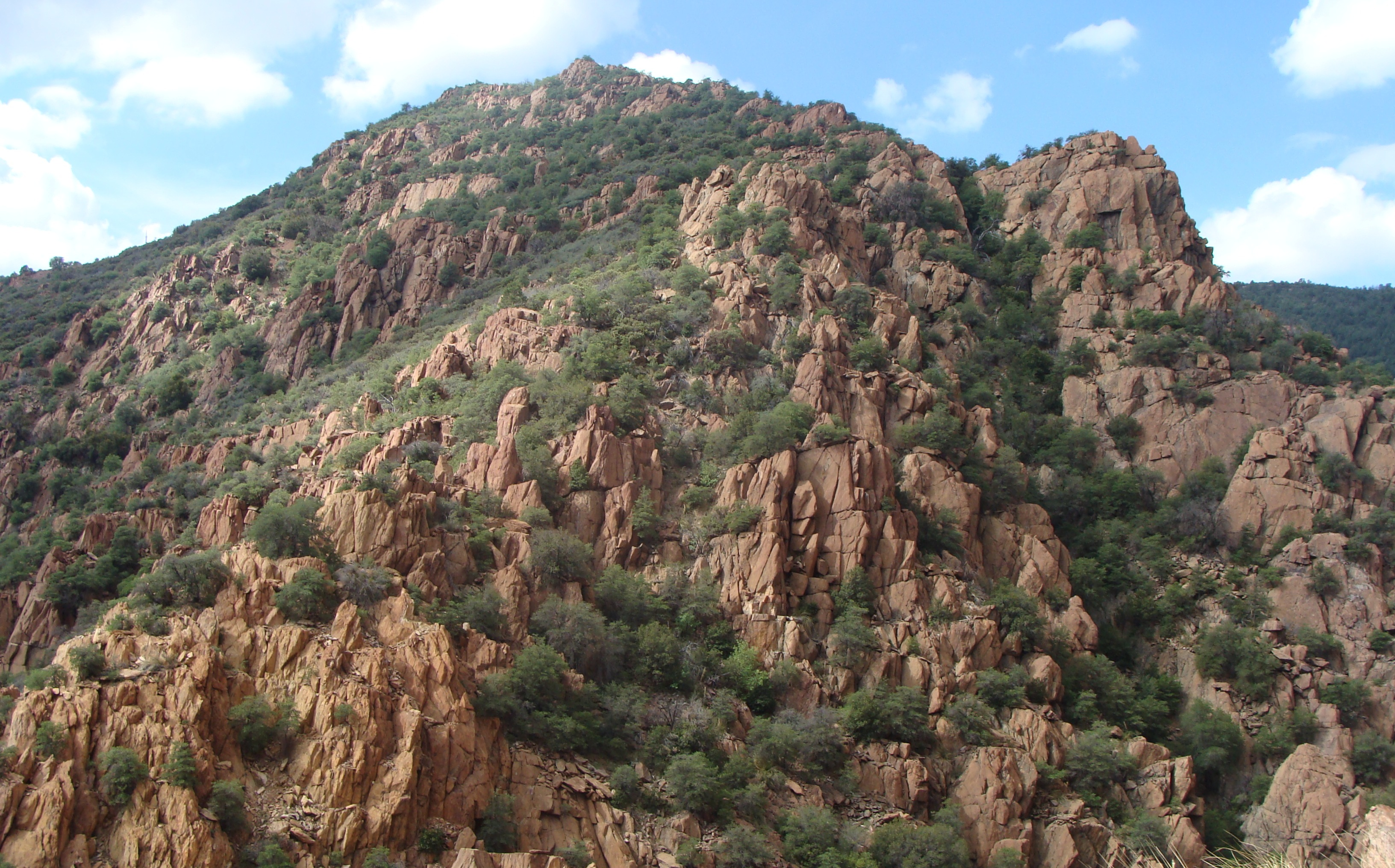
Mingus Mountain, west of Jerome

- Big Black Mesa–Yavapai County
- Black Hills (Yavapai County)–Yavapai County
  - Black Hills (Greenlee County)–Greenlee County
- Black Mountains (Yavapai County)–Yavapai County-(southwest county)
- Bozarth Mesa–Yavapai County
- Bradshaw Mountains–Yavapai County
- Buckhorn Mountains–Yavapai County
- Connell Mountains–Yavapai County
- Date Creek Mountains–Yavapai County
- Granite Dells–Yavapai County
- Granite Mountain–Yavapai County
- Grayback Mountains–Yavapai County
- ( Harcuvar Mountains–NE. La Paz County -- (SW. Yavapai County) )
- ( Hieroglyphic Mountains–N. Maricopa County -- (some in S. Yavapai County) )
- Juniper Mountains–Yavapai County
- Mazatzal Mountains–Southeast Yavapai County -- (and N. Maricopa County, W. Gila County)
- McAllister Range–Yavapai County
- McCloud Mountains–Yavapai County
- Mingus Mountain, (= "Black Hills (Arizona)")–Yavapai County
- Mohon Mountains–Yavapai County
- New River Mountains–Yavapai County & Maricopa County
- ( Poachie Range–SE. Mohave County -- (SW. Yavapai County, NE. La Paz County) )
- Santa Maria Mountains–Yavapai County
- Sierra Prieta–Yavapai County
- Weaver Mountains–Yavapai County
- White Hills, Arizona–Yavapai County
- Wickenburg Mountains–Yavapai County

== Yuma County ==
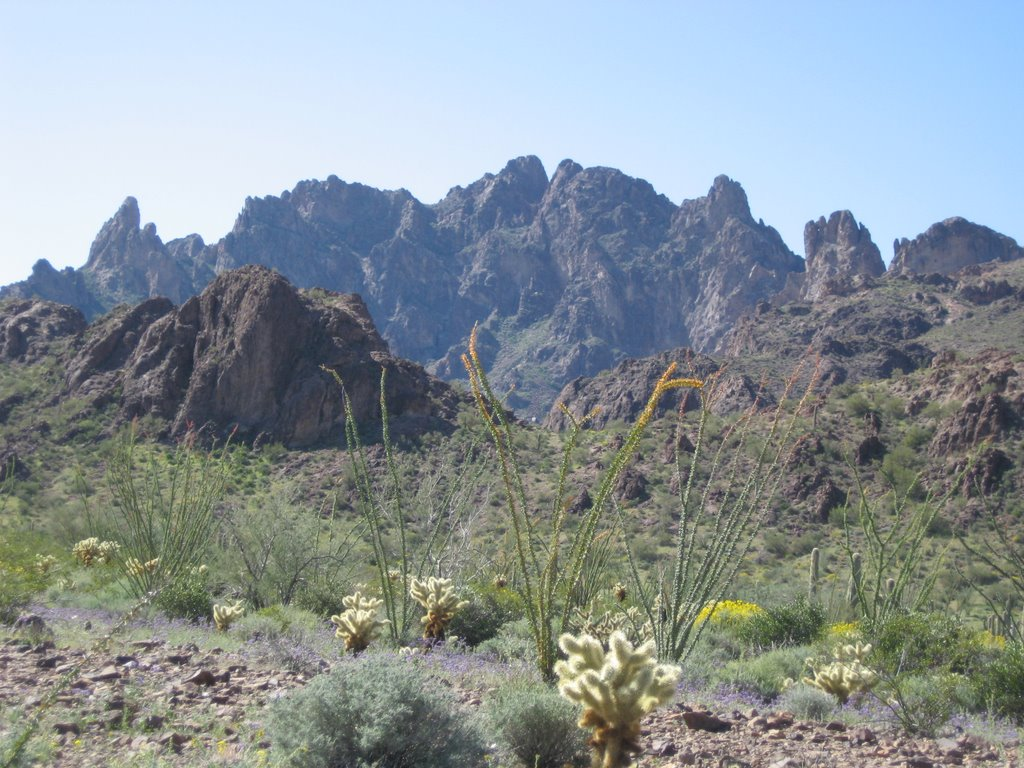
Kofa Mountains

- Agua Caliente Mountains–Yuma County and Maricopa County
- Aguila Mountains–Yuma County
- Bryan Mountains–Yuma County
- Butler Mountains–Yuma County -- (W. of Tinajas Altas Mountains-(minor length & elevation))
- Cabeza Prieta Mountains–Yuma County
- Castle Dome Mountains–Yuma County
- Copper Mountains–Yuma County
- Gila Mountains (Yuma County)–Yuma County
  - ( Gila Mountains (Graham County)–Graham County )
- Kofa Mountains–N. Yuma County - (S. La Paz County)
- Laguna Mountains (Arizona)–Yuma County (see also: Laguna Mountains(Calif))
- ( Little Horn Mountains–S. La Paz County -- (N. Yuma County) )
- Middle Mountains–S. La Paz County -- (N. Yuma County)
- Mohawk Mountains–Yuma County
- Muggins Mountains–Yuma County
- ( New Water Mountains–S. La Paz County -- (connected to Kofa Mountains, N. Yuma County) )
- Palomas Mountains–Yuma County
- Sierra Arida–Yuma County
- Sierra de la Lechuguilla–Yuma County
- Sierra Pinta–Yuma County
- Tank Mountains–Yuma County
- Tinajas Altas Mountains–Yuma County
- Tule Mountains–Yuma County

== New Mexico ==
- Guadalupe Mountains (Hidalgo County)–Hidalgo County, NM - (Cochise County, AZ & Sonora, Mexico)
- San Francisco Mountains (New Mexico)–New Mexico & Greenlee County

== Mexico ==
=== Sonora ===
- Guadalupe Mountains (Hidalgo County)–Hidalgo County, NM - (Cochise County, AZ & Sonora, Mexico)
- Sierra Madre Occidental–Regional Western Mexico - (extension of individual ranges, along entire United States-Mexico border)
  - Sky island/ Madrean sky islands

== See also ==
- List of mountain ranges of California
- List of mountain ranges of Nevada
- List of mountain ranges of the Lower Colorado River Valley
- List of mountains and hills of Arizona by height
- List of rivers of Arizona
- List of valleys of Arizona
- Madrean Sky Islands/ Sky island, a biome region of SE Ariz, SW New Mex, and Northern Mexico proper.
