= Gila Mountains =

Gila Mountains is the name of two mountain ranges along the Gila River in Arizona:

- The Gila Mountains (Graham County) in eastern Arizona
- The Gila Mountains (Yuma County) in southwestern Arizona

Additionally, Gila mountains is a term used to denote the ranges of the Gila River headwaters in New Mexico. These are:

- The Black Range
- The Mogollon Mountains
- The Mimbres Mountains

== See also ==
- Gila Bend Mountains
