= Sacaton Mountains (Arizona) =

Mountain range in Pinal County, Arizona

Coordinates: 33.014°N 111.820°W

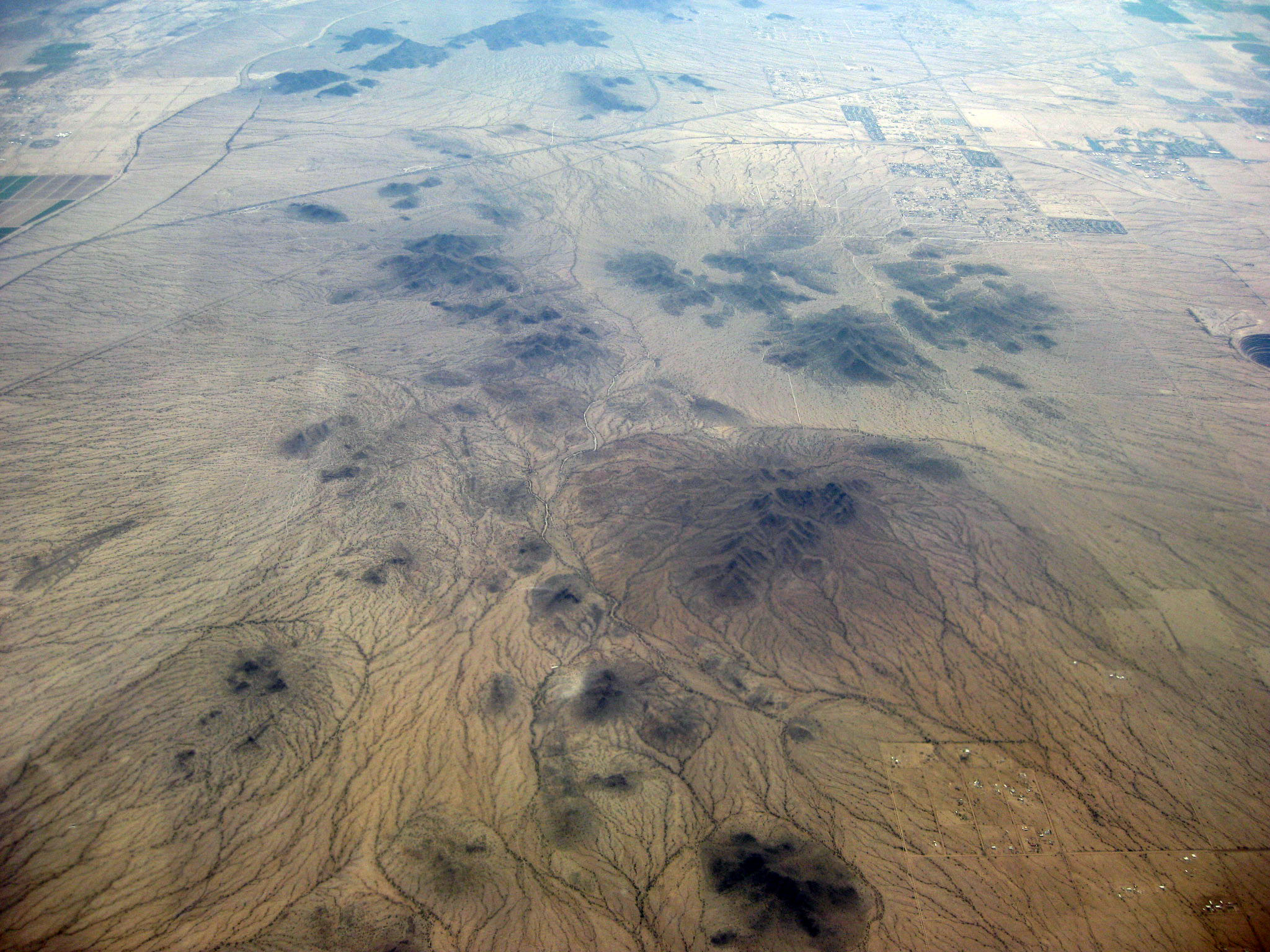
Oblique air photo of the Sacaton Mountains, facing east, August 2011

The Sacaton Mountains are a range of granitic inselbergs in Pinal County, Arizona, located south of Phoenix near Casa Grande, Arizona.

The highest peak is Sacaton Peak at an elevation of 2755 ft. Other peaks include Agency Peak, Hayden Peak, Thin Mountain, Fivemile Peak, and Signal Peak. Interstate 10 passes through the Sacaton Mountains.

== See also ==
- List of mountains and hills of Arizona by height
