= Mescal Mountains =

Mountain range in Arizona, United States

The Mescal Mountains are located in Southern Gila County, AZ

The Mescal Mountains (in Western Apache language: Nadah Choh Dasán – "Big Mescal Sitting There") are a series of connected mountain ridges in southern Gila County, Arizona. Their highest point is El Capitan Mountain, which has an elevation of 6,568 ft ( 2,002 m) and a prominence of 1,828 ft ( 557 m ). The highest point has a topographic isolation of 5.98 miles (10 km), with the nearest point of equal or greater elevation being to the north west in the Pinal Mountains (in Apache: ). The mountain ridges are visible in the east from Arizona State Route 77 between Globe and Winkelman. The range is approximately 10 miles west of San Carlos Lake, which lies in the San Carlos Apache Indian Reservation; the ridges themselves also mostly fall within the boundary of the reservation, with the exception of the western section and the high point. As such, hiking the ridge may require special permission from San Carlos Apache Indian Reservation, although no trails exist on the mountains themselves or leading to them. The ridge's relative proximity to the more visually dominant Pinal Mountains, (which are also visible from the same section of the AZ 77 highway) make it an often-overlooked feature. The range is one of many to occur in the Arizona transition zone.

== Location ==
The ranges' high point of El Capitan Mountain is located at the coordinates 33.2001°N, 110.7562°W. The mountains are located in southern Gila County, Arizona, on the southwestern boundary of the San Carlos Indian Reservation, and the nearest towns are Christmas and Winkelman to the south.
