= Sevenmile Mountains =

Landform in Gila County, Arizona

- Location within Arizona

Highest point
- Peak: Seven
- Elevation: 6,629 ft (2,021 m)

Geography
- Country: United States
- State: Arizona
- Range coordinates: 33°34′13″N 110°34′25″W

The Sevenmile Mountains are a mountain range in central Gila County in the U.S. state of Arizona. The range has a maximum elevation of 6,629 ft (2,021 m) and a prominence of 989 ft (301 m). The highest peak is labelled Seven on the USGS topo sheet and has a topographic isolation of 13.35 miles (21 km). The majority of the southern end of the range is located on the San Carlos Apache Indian Reservation. The high point and the northwestern tip of the range is in the Tonto National Forest and is open to free range hiking (hiking without any trails). The mountains' high point is located just 3 miles east from a section of the U.S. Route 60 in Arizona in between Globe, Arizona and Show Low, Arizona. The southern end of the range (which encompasses most of the entire range) that is inside the San Carlos Apache Indian Reservation should only be hiked with permission from the Reservation. The range is one of many that occur in the Arizona transition zone.

== Location ==
The high point of the range is at 33°36′06″N 110°35′09″W. The nearest town/city is Globe, Arizona, approximately 17 miles to the southwest on U.S. Route 60.

== Camping ==
Approximately 3.6 miles west-southwest of the peak on US Route 60 is the Jones Water campground. Jones Water is a special developed campground with some small private tent sites along a mature and lush riparian area at an elevation of 4,000 ft (1,200 m). Jones Water is a free primitive campground and offers only basic amenities.
