= John the Baptist Mountains =

Landform in Pima County, Arizona, US

Coordinates: 32.2567264°N 112.9062668°W

The John the Baptist Mountains are a small mountain range in western Pima County, Arizona, United States, approximately 8.5 miles (13.7 km) southwest of the town of Ajo, Arizona. The range is approximately three miles (4.8 km) long and about one mile (1.6 km) wide at its widest point. The highpoint of the range is 2,161 feet above sea level and is located at 32°15'24"N, 112°54'24"W (NAD 1983 datum). The bulk of the range lies on lands administered by the Bureau of Land Management and a small portion extends westward into the Cabeza Prieta National Wildlife Refuge.

The range is named after John C. Butala, a hermit who lived for a number of years in a shack on the range's eastern side. Butala was born in 1880, and served in the Spanish–American War with the 15th Minnesota Volunteer Infantry Regiment. He chose to spend the last decades of his life as a hermit living in the desert. There was some belief locally that he had been shell shocked during his military service, but that is not confirmed. He was known as an eccentric with long matted hair, and most of the year he would wear only tennis shoes and a loincloth made from gunnysacks. He was also known for feeding and befriending a variety of desert wildlife around his camp, and some became so tame that they would eat out of his hand. It is likely that the nickname of "John the Baptist" derived from this behavior and his appearance as a wild-eyed desert prophet. Despite his eccentric ways, he was known for his mechanical and engineering abilities, and he would regularly be summoned into town to repair automobiles and heavy equipment at the New Cornelia Mine. Later in life he withdrew entirely from society, and died from malnutrition in 1961 at the age of 81. He is buried in Ajo.
