= Mineral Mountains (Arizona) =

Landform in Pinal County, Arizona

Coordinates: 33.1949°N 111.1835°W

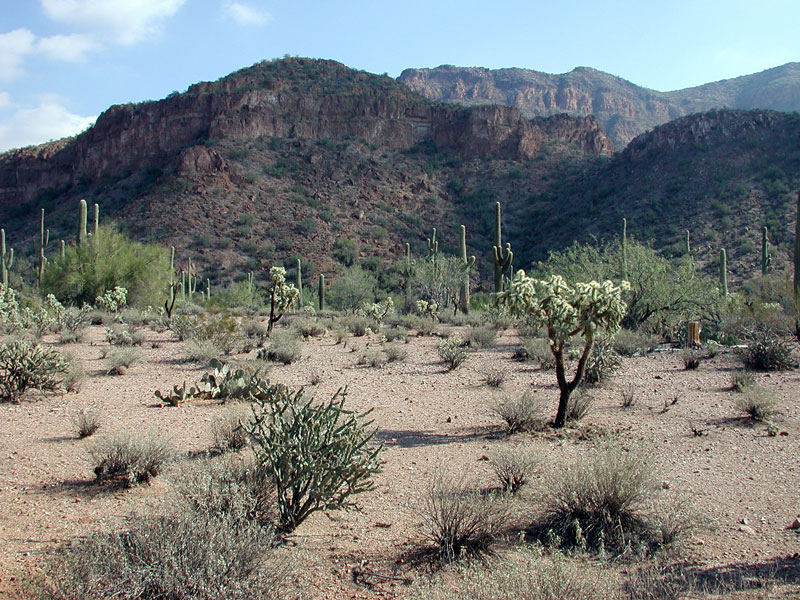
Mineral Mountains viewed from the south, near the entrance to Box Canyon

The Mineral Mountains are a group of rugged, volcanic hills and mountains southwest of Superior and northeast of Florence in Pinal County, Arizona.

The White Canyon Wilderness Area is in the eastern portion of this range.
