= Mustang Mountains =

Landform in southern Arizona

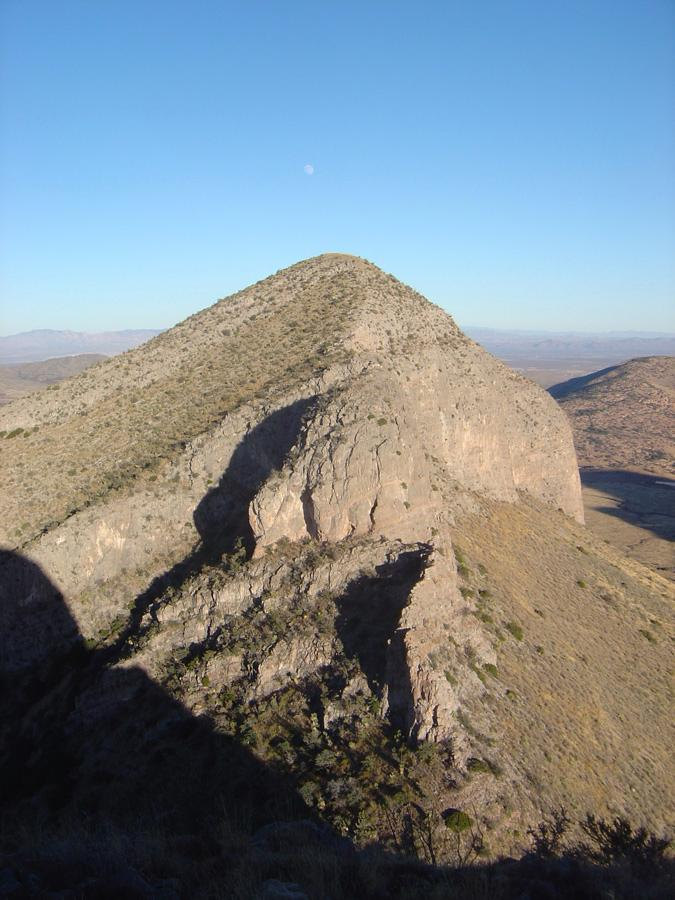
- Mustang Mountains

Highest point
- Peak: Unnamed peak
- Elevation: 6,469 ft (1,972 m)
- Coordinates: 31°42′N 110°30′W

Dimensions
- Length: 14 mi (23 km) East to West
- Width: 12 mi (19 km) North to South Extent includes low land hills and valleys
- Area: 77 mi^{2} (200 km^{2})

Geography
- Location within Arizona
- Country: United States
- State: Arizona
- District(s): Cochise County and Santa Cruz County

The Mustang Mountains are a mountain range located in the southeast region of Arizona, are on the northwest side of Fort Huachuca. They are found at the southern end of the Whetstone Mountains.

The highest peak rises to 6,469 feet.
