= Aubrey Hills =

Landform in Mohave County, Arizona

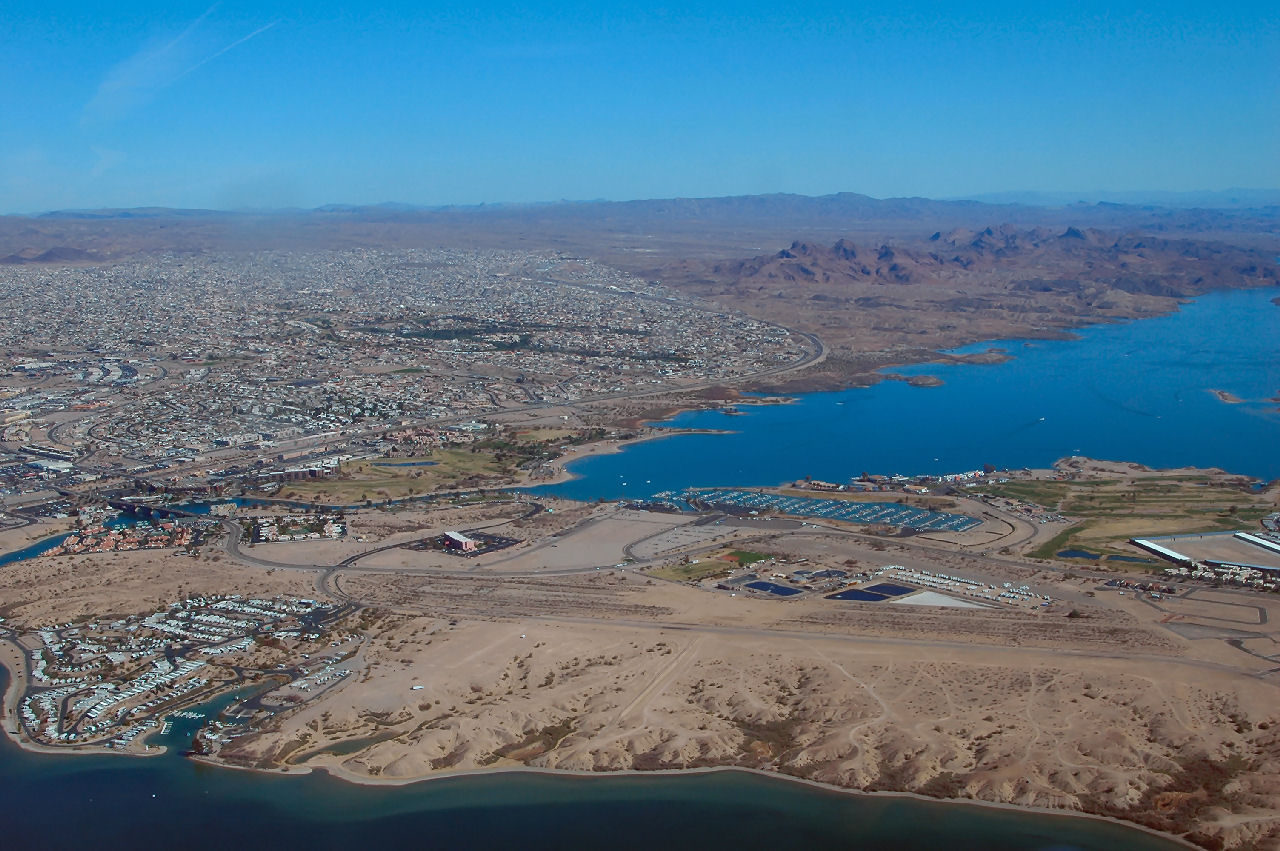
- View southeast. The dark Aubrey Hills are adjacent the east side of Lake Havasu, southeast of Lake Havasu City. (expandable photo)

Highest point
- Peak: Peak 1537, southeast, near terminus
- Elevation: 1,537 ft (468 m)

Dimensions
- Length: 16 mi (26 km) NW-SE
- Width: 4.5 mi (7.2 km)

Geography
- Location within Arizona
- Country: United States
- State: Arizona
- Regions: Mojave Desert and Sonoran Desert
- County: Mohave
- Communities: Lake Havasu City and Parker Dam
- Range coordinates: 34°19′N 114°6′W
- Borders on: Colorado River, Lake Havasu, Mohave Mountains, Bill Williams Mountains and Bill Williams River

The Aubrey Hills in Arizona in the Lower Colorado River Valley corridor are a small, lower elevation, craggy mountain range bordering the southeast side of Lake Havasu. The range is about 16mi (26 km) long, trending exactly northwest by southeast.

The southeast terminus of the range contains its highpoint, Peak 1537, 1,537 feet (468 m); the southeast end of the range also borders the short, west-flowing Bill Williams River. The moderate height mountains that parallel the range eastward are the Bill Williams Mountains.
