= Agua Caliente Mountains =

Landform in Arizona

- Location within Arizona

Highest point
- Peak: Morris Peak
- Elevation: 1,240 ft (380 m)
- Coordinates: 32°59′49″N 113°19′56″W

Geography
- Country: United States
- State: Arizona

The Agua Caliente Mountains are a small range in eastern Yuma and western Maricopa counties in southwest Arizona. The community of Hyder is on the north side of the range adjacent to the Union Pacific rail line and Hyder Road. The community of Agua Caliente lies on the south flank of the range and the Gila River lies to the south.

The highest point is Morris Peak at 1,240 ft (380 m) rising 700 ft (210 m) above the surrounding desert plain in the northwest part of the range in Yuma County.
