= Gila Mountains (Graham County) =

Mountain range in Arizona, United States

- Location within Arizona

Highest point
- Peak: Slaughter Mountain (Arizona), center range-(north)
- Elevation: 6,556 ft (1,998 m)
- Coordinates: 33°07′27″N 109°46′02″W

Dimensions
- Length: 35 mi (56 km) NW-SE
- Width: 10 mi (16 km) NE-SW

Geography
- Country: United States
- State: Arizona
- Regions: Arizona transition zone ((southern)-White Mountains) ((northeast)-Sonoran Desert)
- County: Graham County
- Cities: Fort Thomas, Thatcher and Safford
- Borders on: Gila Valley (Graham County) and Gila River-SW; Santa Teresa & Pinaleno Mountains-SW; Ash Flat, Natanes Mountains & Plateau-NNW; Black Hills (Greenlee County)-ESE
- Topo map(s): USGS Weber Peak, Arizona 7.5 minute quad

The Gila Mountains of Graham County are a mountain range in central-east Arizona. It borders the Gila River and Gila Valley on the valley's northeast in north-central Graham County; also the San Carlos Indian Reservation. The mountain range sits on the southern perimeter of the White Mountains and is located in the southeast area of Arizona's transition zone.

The Gila Mountains lie northwest of Safford, Arizona and the Santa Teresa Mountains lie to the southwest across the Gila Valley. The highest point of the Gila Mountains is Slaughter Mountain at 6,556 feet (1,998 m); the Fishhooks Wilderness is located on the northwest end of the mountain range.

The Safford copper mine is located on the southern flank of the range.
