= List of valleys of Arizona =

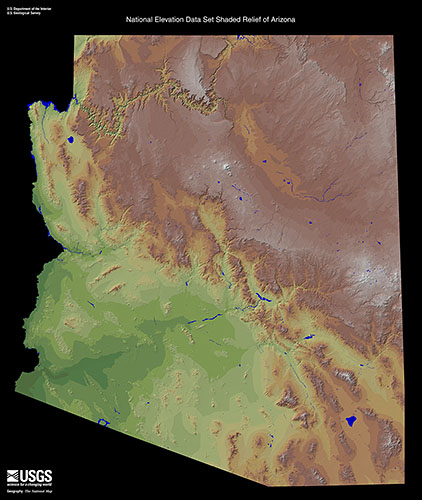
Shaded relief map, Arizona.

This is a list of valleys of Arizona. Valleys are ordered alphabetically, by county.

== Apache County ==
B

- Bat Canyon
- Beautiful Valley

C

- Chinle Valley, Chinle, Arizona

M

- Monument Valley

R

- Red Rock Valley

W

- Windy Valley (Arizona)

== Cochise County ==
C

- Cienega Valley (Arizona)

S

- San Bernardino Valley
- San Pedro Valley (Arizona), San Pedro River (Arizona)
- San Simon Valley
- Sulphur Springs Valley

== Coconino County ==
A

- Aubrey Valley

C

- Chino Valley (Arizona)

L

== Gila County ==
S

- Salt River Valley

== Graham County ==
A

- Aravaipa Valley, Aravaipa Creek

G

- Gila River Valley
- Gila Valley (Graham County)

W

- Whitlock Valley, Whitlock Mountains

== La Paz County ==
B

- Butler Valley (Arizona)

L

- Lower Colorado River Valley

M

- McMullen Valley

P

- Palo Verde Valley, (also Imperial & Riverside Counties, CA), Palo Verde Mountains, (CA)
- Parker Valley

== Maricopa County ==
A

- Aguila Valley

C

- Childs Valley
- Citrus Valley

D

- Dendora Valley

G

- Gila River Valley
- Growler Valley

H

- Hyder Valley

K

- Kaka Valley

M

- McMullen Valley

P

- Paradise Valley (Arizona), Paradise Valley, Arizona
- Pleasant Valley (Arizona)

R

- Rainbow Valley (Arizona)

S

- Salt River Valley

T

- Tonopah Desert

== Mohave County ==
A

- Antelope Valley (Arizona)

B

- Big Valley (Arizona)

C

- Clayhole Valley
- Cottonwood Valley (Arizona/Nevada)

D

- Detrital Valley
- Dutch Flat (Arizona)

H

- Hualapai Valley
- Lower Colorado River Valley

L

- Lower Hurricane Valley

M

- Main Street Valley
- Mohave Valley, Mohave Mountains, (also a valley of San Bernardino County, CA)

S

- Sacramento Valley (Arizona), Sacramento Wash
  - Golden Valley, Arizona

U

- Upper Hurricane Valley

V

- Virgin Valley, Virgin Mountains, Virgin River

W

- Wolf Hole Valley

== Navajo County ==
K

- Kletha Valley

M

- Monument Valley

== Pima County ==
A

- Altar Valley
- Avra Valley, Avra Valley, Arizona

B

- Baboquivari Valley, Baboquivari Mountains

C

- Childs Valley
- Cienega Valley (Arizona)

G

- Green Valley, Arizona
- Growler Valley, Growler Mountains

L

- La Quituni Valley

O

- Oro Valley, Arizona

P

- Pipyak Valley

Q

- Quijotoa Valley

V

- Valley of the Ajo, Ajo, Arizona

== Pinal County ==
F

- Falcon Valley

G

- Gila River Valley

== Santa Cruz County ==
C

- Cienega Valley (Arizona)

G

- Gringo Gulch

S

- San Rafael Valley

== Yavapai County ==
A

- Aguila Valley

C

- Chino Valley (Arizona), (at Paulden, Arizona-(south terminus, Big Chino Wash); Chino Valley, Arizona to south)
  - Little Chino Valley

L

- Lonesome Valley
  - Little Chino Valley

P

- Prescott Valley, Arizona
- Skull Valley (Arizona), Skull Valley, Arizona

V

- Verde Valley

W

- Williamson Valley

== Yuma County ==
D

- Dome Valley, Dome, Arizona

G

- Gila River Valley
- Gila Valley (Yuma County)
- Growler Valley, Growler Mountains

K

- King Valley

L

- Lower Colorado River Valley

M

- Mohawk Valley (Arizona)

P

- Palo Verde Valley, Palo Verde Mountains
- Park Valley (Arizona)
- San Cristobal Valley

== Valleys in the Gila River Valley corridor ==
- Gila Valley (Graham County)
- Pleasant Valley (Arizona)
- Rainbow Valley (Arizona)
- Citrus Valley
- Dendora Valley
- Hyder Valley
- Park Valley (Arizona)
- San Cristobal Valley
- Mohawk Valley (Arizona)
- Dome Valley
- Gila Valley (Yuma County)

== Valleys in the Lower Colorado River Valley corridor, Arizona ==
- Sacramento Valley (Arizona)
- Mohave Valley
- Parker Valley
- Palo Verde Valley
- Gila Valley (Yuma County)
- Yuma Valley, (also in Baja California(state), Mexico?)

=== California ===
- Mohave Valley
- Chemehuevi Valley, Chemehuevi Wash
- Vidal Valley
- Parker Valley
- Palo Verde Valley

== Alphabetic listing ==
A

- Aguila Valley
- Altar Valley
- Antelope Valley (Arizona)
- Aravaipa Valley
- Aubrey Valley
- Avra Valley, Avra Valley, Arizona

B

- Baboquivari Valley, Baboquivari Mountains
- Bat Canyon
- Beautiful Valley
- Big Valley (Arizona)
- Butler Valley (Arizona)

C

- Childs Valley
- Chinle Valley
- Chino Valley (Arizona)
  - Little Chino Valley
- Citrus Valley
- Clayhole Valley

D

- Dendora Valley
- Detrital Valley
- Dome Valley
- Dutch Flat (Arizona)

F

- Falcon Valley

G

- Gila River Valley
- Gila Valley (Graham County)
- Gila Valley (Yuma County)
- Golden Valley, Arizona
- Green Valley, Arizona
- Growler Valley, Growler Mountains

H

- Hualapai Valley
- Hyder Valley

K

- Kaka Valley
- King Valley
- Kletha Valley

L

- La Quituni Valley
- Lonesome Valley
  - Little Chino Valley
- Lower Colorado River Valley
- Lower Hurricane Valley

M

- Main Street Valley
- McMullen Valley
- Mohave Valley
- Mohawk Valley (Arizona)
- Monument Valley

O

- Oro Valley, Arizona

P

- Palo Verde Valley
- Paradise Valley (Arizona), Paradise Valley, Arizona
- Park Valley (Arizona)
- Parker Valley
- Pipyak Valley
- Pleasant Valley (Arizona)
- Prescott Valley, Arizona

Q

- Quijotoa Valley

R

- Rainbow Valley (Arizona)
- Red Rock Valley

S

- Sacramento Valley (Arizona), Sacramento Wash
  - Golden Valley, Arizona
- Salt River Valley
- San Bernardino Valley
- San Cristobal Valley
- San Pedro Valley (Arizona), San Pedro River (Arizona)
- San Rafael Valley
- San Simon Valley
- Skull Valley (Arizona), Skull Valley, Arizona
- Sulphur Springs Valley

T

- Tonopah Desert

U

- Upper Hurricane Valley

V

- Valley of the Ajo, Ajo, Arizona
- Verde Valley
- Virgin Valley, Virgin Mountains, Virgin River

W

- Whitlock Valley
- Williamson Valley
- Windy Valley (Arizona)
- Wolf Hole Valley

== See also ==
- List of mountain ranges of Arizona
- List of rivers of Arizona

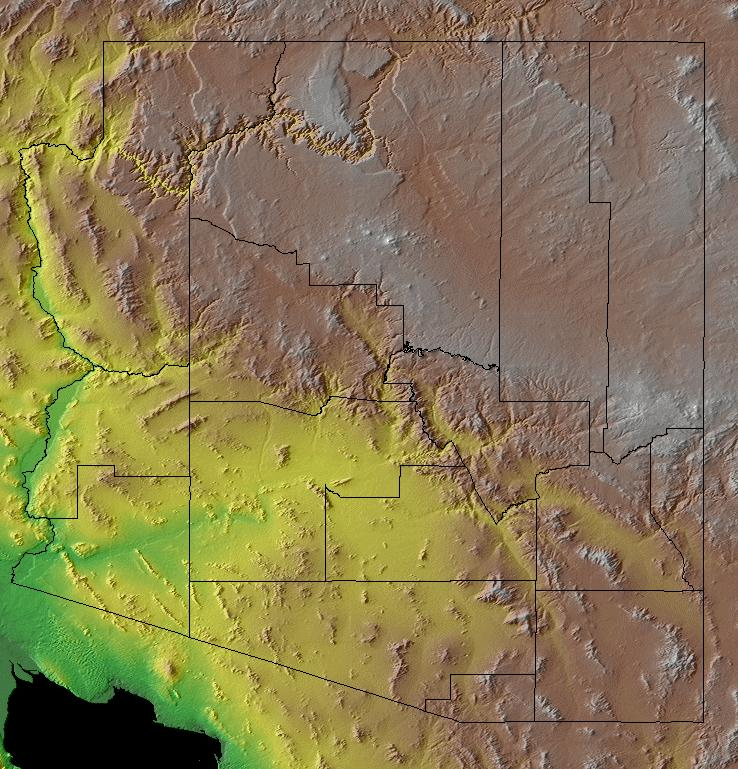
The Gila River, a tributary of the Colorado along the width of southern Arizona, and its valley can be traced on a map of Arizona. The Gila forms the boundary between various counties in Eastern Arizona.
