= Belmont Mountains =

Landform in Maricopa County, Arizona

- Location within Arizona

Highest point
- Peak: Sugarloaf Mountain (Arizona)-(in northwest), Belmont Mountains
- Elevation: 3,418 ft (1,042 m)
- Coordinates: 33°40′39″N 113°05′14″W

Dimensions
- Length: 25 mi (40 km) NW-SE
- Width: 8 mi (13 km)

Geography
- Country: United States
- State: Arizona
- Region: (north-central)-Sonoran Desert
- County: Maricopa County, AZ
- Settlement: Aguila, AZ–Tonopah, AZ
- Range coordinates: 33°38′41″N 112°56′00″W
- Borders on: Hassayampa Plain-NE; Big Horn Mountains (Arizona)-SW; Tonopah Desert-S

The Belmont Mountains are a 25 mi (40 km) long, arid, low elevation mountain range about 50 mi west of Phoenix, Arizona in the northern Sonoran Desert, north of the Gila River. The range is in the south of a region of two parallel washes; the Bouse Wash flows northwest to the Colorado River, and the Centennial Wash flows southeast to meet the Gila River.

== Description ==
The Belmont Mountains are a northwest by southeast trending range, mostly of low hills; the range curves westwards at the west end. At the west, the range is partially connected to the Big Horn Mountains to the southwest, and between the two ranges is the Hummingbird Springs Wilderness. The wilderness takes up much of the Belmont's northwest, and the northeast half of the Big Horn's. Most of the rest of the small Big Horn Mountains is the Big Horn Mountains Wilderness. Valleys border both mountain ranges, to the northeast, and the southwest.

The highest peak in the Belmont Mountains is Sugarloaf Mountain, at 3,418 feet (1,042 m), located at 33.67756°N 113.08736°W; it is at the northeast of the Hummingbird Springs Wilderness.

The center of the range is at Belmont Mountain, located at 33.644758°N 112.933236°W.

== Access ==
The north of the Belmont Range can be reached from Aguila, Arizona, on U.S. Route 60 in Arizona. The south of the range can be reached from Interstate 10 in Arizona, near Tonopah.

== See also ==
- List of mountain ranges of Maricopa County, Arizona
