= Sugarloaf Mountain (Arizona) =

Landform in Maricopa County, Arizona

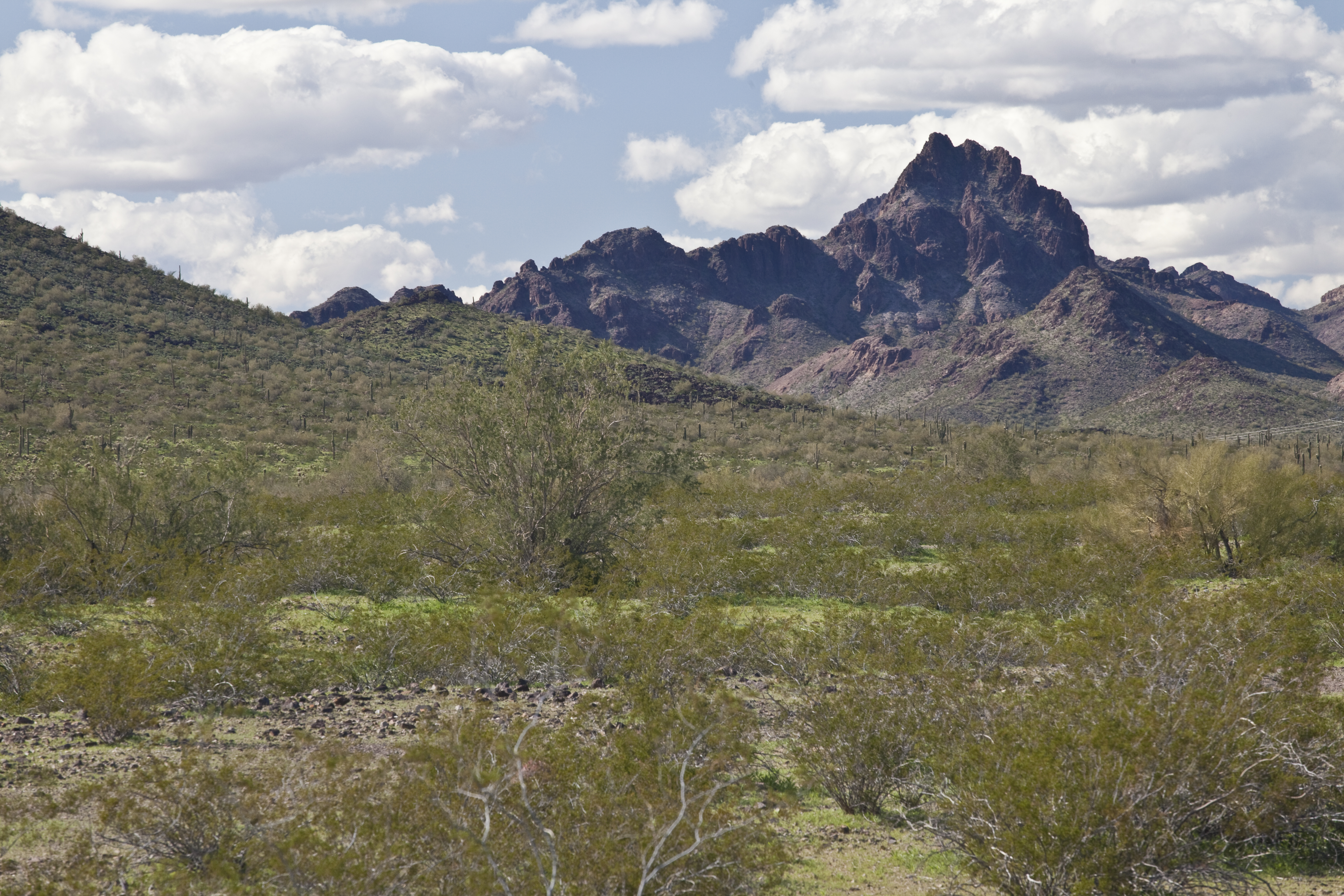
- Sugarloaf Mountain in the Hummingbird Springs Wilderness

Highest point
- Elevation: 3,420 ft (1,042 m) NGVD 29
- Prominence: 1,188 ft (362 m)
- Coordinates: 33°40′41″N 113°03′06″W

Geography
- Location within Arizona
- Location: Maricopa County, Arizona, U.S.
- Topo map: USGS Hummingbird Spring

Sugarloaf Mountain, of Arizona is the tallest peak in the arid, low elevation Hummingbird Springs Wilderness of northwest Maricopa County, and about 65 miles (105 km) west of Phoenix. It rises in the Tonopah Desert about 10 miles (16 km) northwest of the Belmont Mountains. Hummingbird Springs Wilderness is just north of the Big Horn Mountains Wilderness. The two are separated only by a jeep trail that leads to Hummingbird Springs.

The area's washes drain into the southwest-flowing Tiger Wash at the southeast of the Harquahala Mountains. Tiger Wash is a tributary wash in the central-upper regions of the southeast flowing Centennial Wash, a tributary to the Gila River.
