= Dendora Valley =

Landform in Maricopa County, Arizona

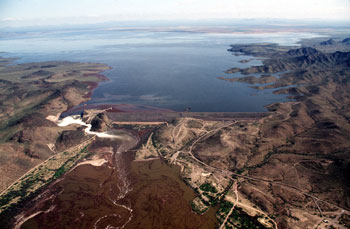
- Painted Rock Dam and Gila River, eastern border of the Dendora Valley (view due east)

- Location within Arizona
- Length: 9 miles (14 km)
- Width: 6 miles (9.7 km)

Geography
- Borders on: Gila Bend Mountains-N; Painted Rock Reservoir-E; Painted Rock Mountains-S; Hyder Valley-W
- Coordinates: 33°3′9″N 113°4′56″W
- Rivers: Gila River
- Interactive map of Dendora Valley

The Dendora Valley is a small valley on the Gila River west of Painted Rock Dam and Reservoir, Arizona, United States. The valley is north of the river, and is the valley west of the north–south Painted Rock Mountains which form the western end of the Painted Rock Reservoir.

The Dendora Valley is only about 9 miles (14 km) long. The Gila Bend Mountains form the northern border from east to west, of both Dendora Valley, and the Painted Rock Reservoir adjacent eastwards; this is the famous Gila Bend formed by the Gila River as it changes direction to south, then west entering the reservoir. Other small mountains and hills border the southwest, namely Oatman Mountain, at 1,732 feet (528 m) and the Face Mountain group with Montezuma Head, (peak) to the west.

The easiest access route to the Dendora Valley is from Hyder in the Hyder Valley about 15 miles (24 km) west-southwest.

The coordinates for Oatman Mountain, on the southwest border of Dendora Valley are 33°3′6.1″N 113°8′5.6″W.
