= Tonopah Desert =

Landform in the Sonoran Desert, Arizona

- Location within Arizona

Geography
- Country: United States
- State: Arizona
- Region: Sonoran Desert
- District: Maricopa County
- Borders on: Belmont Mountains & Hassayampa Plain-NE; Big Horn Mountains (Arizona)–NW; Interstate 10 in Arizona–S; Palo Verde Hills–Gila Bend Mtns–S; Harquahala Plain–SW
- Coordinates: 33°29′37″N 112°56′14″W
- Rivers: Hassayampa River–(east & SE) Gila River–SE; Centennial Wash–(to SW)
- Interactive map of Tonopah Desert

The Tonopah Desert is a small desert plains region of the Sonoran Desert, located west of Phoenix, Arizona. It is adjacent north of Interstate 10 and lies at the southwest intersection of the Hassayampa River with the Gila River. The Tonopah Desert is also just north of the Gila Bend Mountains massif which create the Gila Bend of the river.

The Tonopah Desert is adjacent northwest of the small Palo Verde Hills on Centennial Wash.

== Description ==
The Tonopah Desert is mostly east-west trending, small, approximately 30 mi long, and lies at the plains of low elevation mountains north; the Belmont Mountains are northeast with the Hummingbird Springs Wilderness in its north-northwest. It borders the 'low elevation mountain valley' with the Big Horn Mountains to the west. The Big Horn Mountains Wilderness comprise most of the Big Horns. The desert is bordered east by other mountain foothills on the west border of the Hassayampa River.

The Tonopah Desert also lies between two plains: the narrow southeast ridgeline of the Belmont Mountains and the Hassayampa Plain are northeast. The west and southwest of the Tonopah Desert is connected to the southeast section of the large Harquahala Plain, northwest-southeast trending, the same lineage as the Centennial and Bouse Washes which drain the named plains, mountains, and the desert, (about twenty landforms in the region).

The closest city to the Tonopah Desert is Tonopah, Arizona, located in the center-southwest of the region, elevation 1,122 feet (342 m).

== Access routes and the region ==
Interstate 10 passes east-southeasterly through the south border of the Tonopah Desert; Tonopah, AZ is at the west on I-10. South of the Interstate, and only 5 mi due-southwest of Tonopah is Wintersburg, Arizona, the site of the Palo Verde Nuclear Generating Station.

From Interstate 10, unimproved roads go north into the desert, namely 355th Ave (west); the Sun Valley Parkway is just east going to areas of northwest Phoenix–Glendale.

== Environment ==
The area includes Hummingbird Springs Wilderness, and due to overdrawing of the water table, environmental recharge projects are being made to protect the Tonopah Aquifer, and to reverse the effects of water overuse. The project now in place is a Central Arizona Project, the Tonopah Desert Recharge Project in the Lower Hassayampa Basin. The project started construction of 19 basins in 2004; it became operational in 2006.

== See also ==
- Groundwater recharge
