= Hummingbird Springs Wilderness =

Protected area in Maricopa County, Arizona, US

- IUCN category Ib (wilderness area)
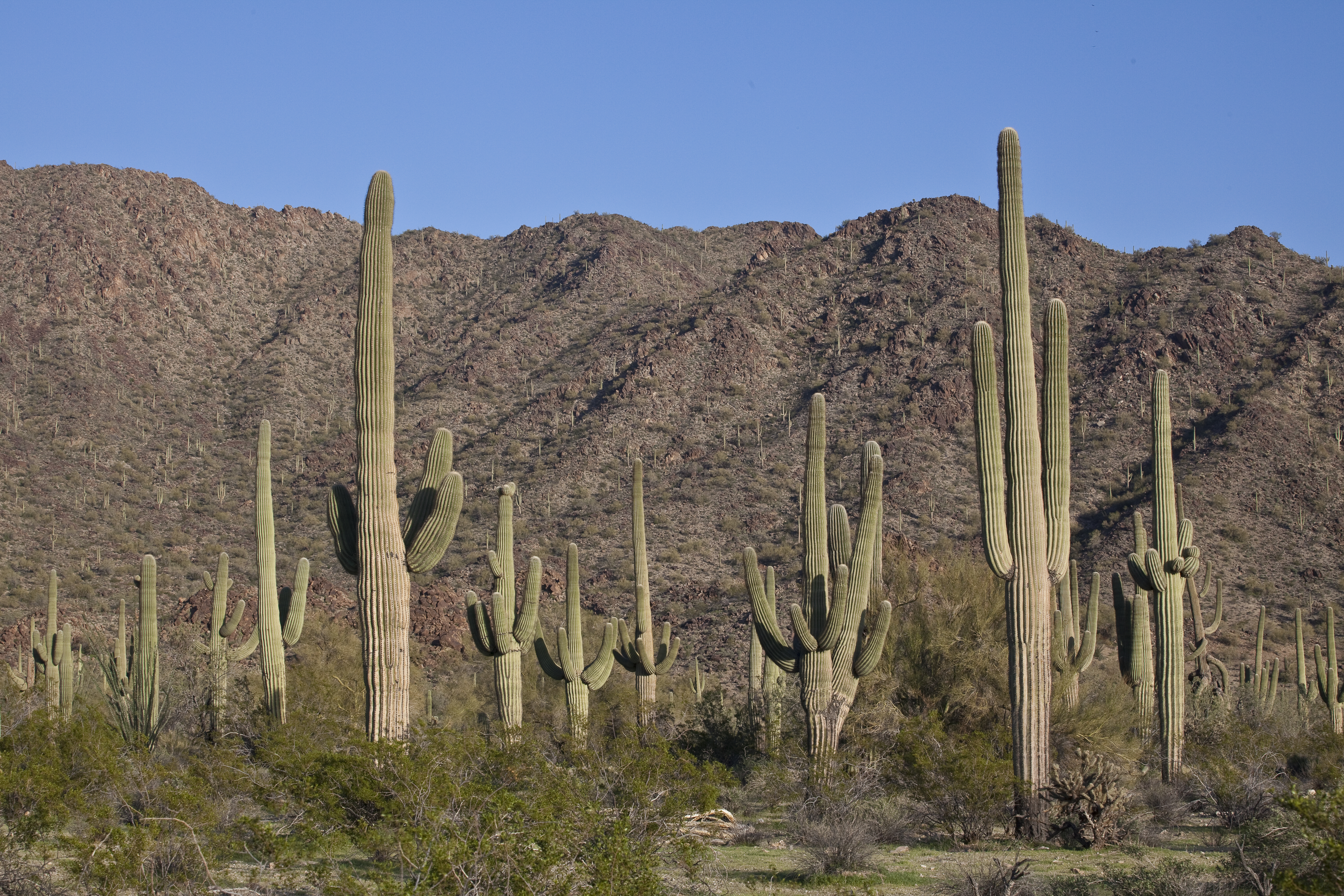

- Location within the United States
- Location: Maricopa County, Arizona, USA
- Nearest city: Tonopah, AZ–Aguila, AZ
- Coordinates: 33.67756°N 113.08736°W
- Area: 31,200 acres (12,626 ha)
- Established: 1990
- Governing body: Bureau of Land Management

The Hummingbird Springs Wilderness is a 31,200-acre (12,626 ha) wilderness administered by the Bureau of Land Management (BLM). The wilderness is located in the northwest of Maricopa County in northern regions of the central Sonoran Desert of Arizona.

The wilderness is located at the northwest end of the Belmont Mountains; the southwest border of the wilderness is the northeast border of the Big Horn Mountains Wilderness, of the Big Horn Mountains (Arizona); this two-mountain region lies at the north and northwest of the small Tonopah Desert, a desert plains region. The northwest of both mountain ranges drain northwest into Tiger Wash, in the upper-central region of a southeast flowing Centennial Wash, a tributary to the Gila River in central, lower elevation desert Arizona.

Sugarloaf Mountain (Arizona) is the highest elevation of the Hummingbird Springs Wilderness and the Belmont Mountains at 3,418 feet (1,042 m).

== See also ==
- List of Arizona Wilderness Areas
