= Saddle Mountain Unified School District =

School district in Maricopa County, Arizona

Location
- 38201 W Indian School Rd, Tonopah, AZ 85354 Tonopah and Buckeye, Arizona United States

District information
- Type: Public
- Motto: Everyone learns, Every day
- Grades: PreK-12
- Superintendent: Mike Winters
- Schools: 6

Students and staff
- Enrollment: 3,265 (as of 2025–26)
- Faculty: 158.0 FTEs
- Student–teacher ratio: 22:1

Other information
- Website: www.smusd90.org

The Saddle Mountain Unified School District is a public unified school district for students from pre-kindergarten to twelfth grade located in parts of Tonopah, Wintersburg, and Buckeye, Arizona. It originally served as Ruth Fisher School District from 1964 to 2001, it now serves these areas with four elementary schools (Tartesso, Winters' Well, and Desert Sunset), one middle school (Ruth Fisher) and Tonopah Valley High School.

As of the 2025–26 school year, the district, comprising six schools, had an enrollment of 3,265 students and 158.0 classroom teachers (on an FTE basis), for a student–teacher ratio of 22:1.
