= TVHS =

TVHS may refer to:

- Table View High School, Cape Town, South Africa
- Tanque Verde High School, Tanque Verde, Arizona, United States
- Tech Valley High School, Rensselaer, New York, United States
- Temecula Valley High School, Temecula, California, United States
- Thompson Valley High School, Loveland, Colorado, United States
- Tobique Valley High School, Plaster Rock, New Brunswick, Canada
- Tonopah Valley High School, Tonopah, Arizona, United States
- Tuscarawas Valley High School, Zoarville, Ohio, United States
- Twin Valley High School (Pennsylvania), Elverson, Pennsylvania, United States
- Twin Valley High School (Virginia), Pilgrim Knob, Virginia, United States
