= Sentinel Plain =

Geographic feature in Arizona

- Location within Arizona
- Length: 64 km (40 mi)

Geography
- Location: Maricopa County, Arizona, United States
- Coordinates: 32.9458808°N 113.2579621°W
- Interactive map of Sentinel Plain

The Sentinel Plain is an extensive northwest–southeast trending plain south of the Gila River Valley in southwestern Arizona, United States. It is centered on the community of Sentinel, Arizona located on Interstate 8, approximately 35 miles (56 km) west of Gila Bend.

The Sentinel Plain is about 40 miles (64 km) long and on the north-northwest, it borders the Hyder Valley and the farming community of Hyder on the Gila River. To the northeast is Painted Rock Reservoir and the Painted Rock Mountains. The south and southwest of the Sentinel Plain is bordered by the Crater Range; the east and southeast is bordered by the White Hills, and the Saucedo Mountains. Midway Wash drains into the center of the plain southeast-northwesterly, but disappears into the ground about 10 miles southeast from the Gila River. The west and southwestern border of the plain contains the northwest-flowing Tenmile Wash-(which also succumbs to ground disappearance, but adjacent to the Gila), and the northwest trending Crater Range.

== See also ==
- Sentinel Plain volcanic field
