= Park Valley (Arizona) =

Landform in Yuma County, Arizona

- Location within Arizona
- Length: 15 mi (24 km)
- Width: 12 mi (19 km)

Geography
- Country: United States
- State: Arizona
- Region: Gila River Valley ((northwest)-Sonoran Desert)
- District: Yuma County, Arizona
- Population centers: Dateland AZ; Sentinel AZ; Hyder, AZ
- Borders on: Hyder Valley-NE; Palomas Mountains-NW; San Cristobal Valley-SW; Sentinel Plain-SE
- Coordinates: 32°47′47″N 113°32′28″W
- Interactive map of Park Valley

The Park Valley of Arizona is a small, northwest by southeast trending valley centered on the Gila River in central-east Yuma County. The southeast border of the valley is the northern Sentinel Plain of Maricopa County which drains northwestwards toward the Gila River Valley.

Interstate 8 is on the south perimeter of the valley, with towns on I-8 of Dateland in the southwest, Aztec on the center-south, and further east, Sentinel on the southeast.

Tenmile Wash, of the Tenmile Wash Watershed has its outfall on the Gila River on the southwest of Park Valley. The coordinates for Dateland, Arizona, on the southwest border of Park Valley are 32°47′47″N 113°32′28″W

== See also ==
- List of valleys of Arizona
