= Painted Rock Mountains =

Range in Maricopa County, Arizona, US

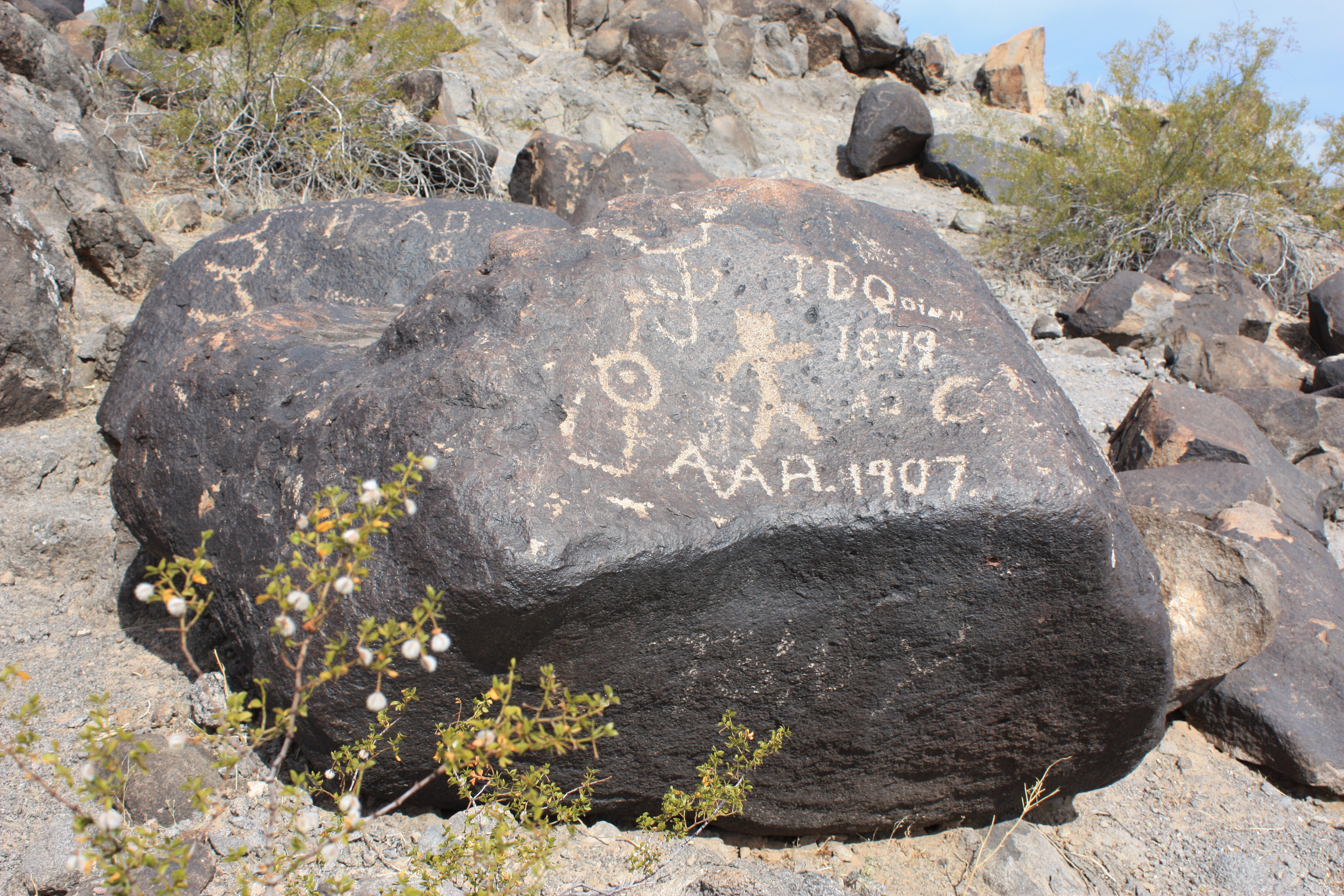
- Petroglyph site at north end of mountain range.

Highest point
- Peak: Unnamed
- Elevation: 1,512 ft (461 m)
- Coordinates: 32°59′23″N 113°01′19″W

Dimensions
- Length: 35 mi (56 km) E-W
- Width: 10 mi (16 km)

Geography
- Location within Arizona
- Country: United States
- State: Arizona
- Region(s): Painted Rock Reservoir & Lower Gila River Valley ((north-central)-Sonoran Desert)
- County: Maricopa County
- Town: Gila Bend, AZ

The Painted Rock Mountains are a short 15-mile (24 km) long mountain range of the north-central Sonoran Desert southwest of Phoenix, Arizona and in southwest Maricopa County. The Gila River flows through the central-north end of the range.

The famous Painted Rock Petroglyph Site lies at the northeast end of the range, adjacent the Painted Rock Reservoir, and the reservoir lies at the eastern end of the agricultural river valley that is locally named as the Lower Gila River Valley, extending approximately from the Colorado River at Yuma to the west and the reservoir at the east. The Gila River crosses all of southern Arizona from southwest New Mexico, and is the drainage for about 1/2 of Arizona (the south).

== Peaks, and landforms ==
The highest elevation in the mountains is "unnamed" at 1,512 feet (461 m), and is located at the central and east region of the range. (The range has many northwest-by-southeast ridgelines.)

== See also ==
- List of mountain ranges of Maricopa County, Arizona
