= Hyder Valley =

Landform in Arizona, United States

Coordinates: 32.9836576°N 113.3001864°W

The Hyder Valley is a 20-mile (32 km) long valley section of the Gila River Valley west of Hyder on the Gila River. The valley is located north of Gila River in southwest Arizona in the northwestern Sonoran Desert. The Park Valley, which crosses the Gila borders to the southwest; the Hyder Valley is the access route to the Dendora Valley northeast which is on the western border of the Painted Rock Dam and Reservoir.

The Hyder Valley lies on the northwest side of the Gila River, and both trend southwest–northeast. The Palomas Mountains are on the west, and the Palomas Plain, which drains three other mountain ranges, and the eastern portion of the Kofa National Wildlife Refuge, lies to the north; Face Mountain and the Gila Bend Mountains are northeast. On the south side of the Gila River, to the southeast lies the Sentinel Plain.
