= Signal Mountain Wilderness =

Protected wilderness in Maricopa County, Arizona

- IUCN category Ib (wilderness area)
- Location within Arizona
- Location: Maricopa County, Arizona, US
- Nearest city: Arlington, Arizona
- Coordinates: 33°11′32″N 112°58′36″W
- Area: 13,350 acres (54 km^{2})
- Established: 1990
- Governing body: U.S. Department of Interior Bureau of Land Management

Signal Mountain Wilderness is a protected wilderness area centered around its namesake Signal Mountain, rising 1,200 feet (370 m) to a summit at 2,057 feet (627 m) in the Gila Bend Mountains in the U.S. state of Arizona. Established in 1990 under the Arizona Desert Wilderness Act, the area is managed by the Bureau of Land Management. The desert wilderness is made up of steep canyons, winding arroyos, and volcanic peaks within a Sonoran Desert ecosystem.

Adjacent to the Woolsey Peak Wilderness to the southeast, divided by a rugged jeep road, the area contains typical Sonoran flora: palo verde, creosote bush, saguaro cactus, and bursage. There is an abundance of wildlife including mule deer, desert bighorn sheep, and javelina as well as bobcats and mountain lions.

== See also ==
- List of Arizona Wilderness Areas
- List of U.S. Wilderness Areas
