= Lucía Martínez (Woolsey) =

Lucía Martínez (Woolsey) (1854–1900) was a woman of Yaqui descent who was the first Indigenous women to file a legal challenge against an Arizona statesman. It is assumed she was born in Sonora in 1854 and was taken into the Apache slave trade at a young age. Martínez escaped in 1864 at the age of 10 but was quickly captured again, this time by "King" Samuel Woolsey. She became Woolsey's indentured servant under the Howell Code and was also a sexual servant to Woolsey. Martínez gave birth to 3 of Woolsey's biological children and following his marriage to Mary H. Taylor in 1871, lost custody of her two eldest daughters. Lucía found herself a lawyer with the intention of regaining custody and that same year filed a habeas corpus petition. Her case made it to court and the outcome was not what she had hoped, "King" Woolsey maintained custody with Martínez receiving only temporary custody. After Woolsey's death in 1879, Martínez was granted custody again and took further legal action in an attempt to receive an inheritance for her children. Although she did not succeed, she still received $1,000 from an indenture bond that had been signed in court 8 years prior.

== Apache slave trade ==
Sonora was considered a peaceful community during the mid-19th century, but as the Mexican war for independence took place, the Sonoran government began to crumble. Sonoran Yaquis faced violence and abuse from Mexicans with most Yaquis either joining a resistance or being forced out of their land. Between it all, Yaquis also found themselves involved in a slave network with the Apaches. Mexicans were being sold by Yaquis to the Apaches and Yaquis were being sold by the Apaches to Americans. During this time, Lucía Martínez was born in 1854 and through uncertain events became victim to the Apache Slave Trade.

== Early life ==
After planning to escape her captors in 1864 at only 10 years old, Lucía Martínez started her 200-mile journey back home to Sonora. Unfortunately, she did not make it too far before being recaptured by Apache killer and senator, Samuel Woolsey, who was also known as "King" Woolsey. He took Martínez and made her his servant. That same year Woolsey took part in approving the Howell Code (named after William Howell) with Arizona's territorial legislature. Under this code, "minor Indians" could be indentured without parental consent until 18 for girls and 21 for boys. The Howell Code also approved the age of 10 years old for sexual consent. This allowed for Woolsey to take advantage of Lucía; he demanded her to work on his ranch and serve as his mistress with no opportunity to testify against him.

== Family life and legal challenges ==
In May 1871 "King" Woolsey married Mary H. Taylor. Following the marriage Woolsey evicted Lucía and took custody of the children, two of which he sent to a neighboring ranch. Lucía was left vulnerable and alone caring for her newborn son. She found refuge in Yuma with support from two catholic churches as she worked to develop her case against Woolsey. Finding legal representation was not easy for a non-citizen in a community where most men already knew one another. Luckily, Martínez was able to find herself a lawyer who filed a habeas corpus petition on July 29, 1871. The case was taken to court in Maricopa County, Martínez was represented by Marcus D. Dobbins and the result of the case granted Lucía with temporary physical custody of her two daughters because of their young age. However, a contract was signed stating that the two girls would be indentured servants to their father until the age of 18 under the agreement that Woolsey would provide all basic necessities. This was not the best outcome for Lucía and her children and she continued her battle up until Woolsey's unexpected death in 1879. Martínez began taking legal action to acquire an inheritance for her children but was unsuccessful. Her children did however, receive $1,000 from the indenture bond that was signed in 1871. They also took their father's surname which provided them social acceptance and in 1880 Lucía claimed herself and her children to be Mexican under the census to avoid discrimination under the Howell Code and claimed herself to be a widow, they were listed as "white," following the legal standard of white status granted to Mexican nationals after the Treaty of Guadalupe Hidalgo.

== Legacy ==
Based on her historic legal significance, Martinez's family nominated her to be inducted into the Arizona Women's Hall of Fame and that organization included Lucia Martinez in their roster of significant women in Arizona's history in 2021.
