= Woolsey Peak =

Summit and wilderness area in Maricopa County, Arizona

Woolsey Peak Wilderness
- IUCN category Ib (wilderness area)
- Location within the United States
- Location: Maricopa County, Arizona, USA
- Nearest city: Arlington, AZ
- Coordinates: 33°7′50″N 112°54′11″W
- Area: 64,000 acres (259 km^{2})
- Established: 1990
- Governing body: U.S. Department of Interior Bureau of Land Management

Woolsey Peak Wilderness is a protected wilderness area centered around its namesake Woolsey Peak, rising 2,500 feet to a summit at 3270 feet (996 m) in the Gila Bend Mountains in the U.S. state of Arizona. Established in 1990 under the Arizona Desert Wilderness Act the area is managed by the Bureau of Land Management. This desert wilderness is best described as "a perfect example of pristine Sonoran Desert".

Adjacent to the Signal Mountain Wilderness to the north, divided only by a rugged jeep road, the area is broken up by ridges and ragged peaks interspersed in lava flows and basalt mesas. A Sonoran Desert ecosystem supports populations of mule deer, desert bighorn sheep, and javelina as well as bobcats and mountain lions.

== See also ==
- List of Arizona Wilderness Areas
- List of U.S. Wilderness Areas
- King Woolsey
