= Tonopah Valley High School =

School in Arizona, United States

Coordinates: 33.491825°N 112.873131°W

Location
- 38201 West Indian School Road; Tonopah, Maricopa County, Arizona 85354; United States

Information
- School type: Public high school
- Motto: Be safe, Be responsible, Be respectful.
- Established: 2005-2006
- School district: Saddle Mountain Unified School District
- Principal: Nathan Bolden
- Teaching staff: 38.00 (FTE)
- Grades: 9–12
- Enrollment: 865 (2024-2025)
- Student to teacher ratio: 23
- Colors: Scarlet and black
- Mascot: Phoenix
- Website: tvhs.smusd90.org

Tonopah Valley High School is a high school in Tonopah, Maricopa County, Arizona.

The High School was under construction between 2003 and 2005 in the efforts to serve Tonopah's growing community. The school was officially opened for students following the 2005–2006 school year. Notes the Tonopah Valley Community Council

It is part of the Saddle Mountain Unified School District, which also operates Tartesso Elementary School, Winters' Well Elementary School, Desert Sunset Elementary School and Ruth Fisher Middle School.

== Tonopah Valley American Football ==
The Tonopah Valley Football team represents the school in the 2A Conference. The football program had one of its best play throughout the 2024–25 season, ending their run on a semifinal loss to state runner ups, Pima High School with a score of 34–40. Although a loss, the program had its best run yet, ending the season with a 12–1 overall record and being 2A Gila Region Champions. As of 2026, the Tonopah Valley High School football team has a 4–7 overall record in the 2025–26 season.

== Tonopah Valley Law and Public Safety ==
=== 2025-2026 ===
During the school year of 2026, the school's Law and Public Safety program had earned the prestigious Chapter of Distinction Award - Gold Level for SkillsUSA.

Students competed at the 2026 SkillsUSA Region 5 Competition in Criminal Justice and Crime Scene Investigation. Tonopah Valley achieved first place in both competitions, qualifying for the SkillsUSA State Leadership Conference.

The program is directed by former Police officer Adam Shoun to give his students education due to his experience.

== Tonopah Valley Marching Band ==
=== 2025 ===
Tonopah Valley High School has a music program being directed by Alex Castro since the renaissance of the program after a 1-year hiatus. The program has since then seen a resurgence in members following the 2024 season. During the 2025 season the program has seen itself involved in two competitions, that being the Rock the Ridge Invitational at Mountain Ridge High School (October 4, 2025), which helped them qualify for the Arizona Marching Band Association competition on November 8, 2025. Though the program did not make it far, it did see glory in placing in the top three during the Rock the Ridge competition for its percussion drum line, the highest placing yet in the program's history.

- Schools in Maricopa County, Arizona
