= Painted Rock Petroglyph Site =

Archaeological site in Arizona, United States

- U.S. National Register of Historic Places
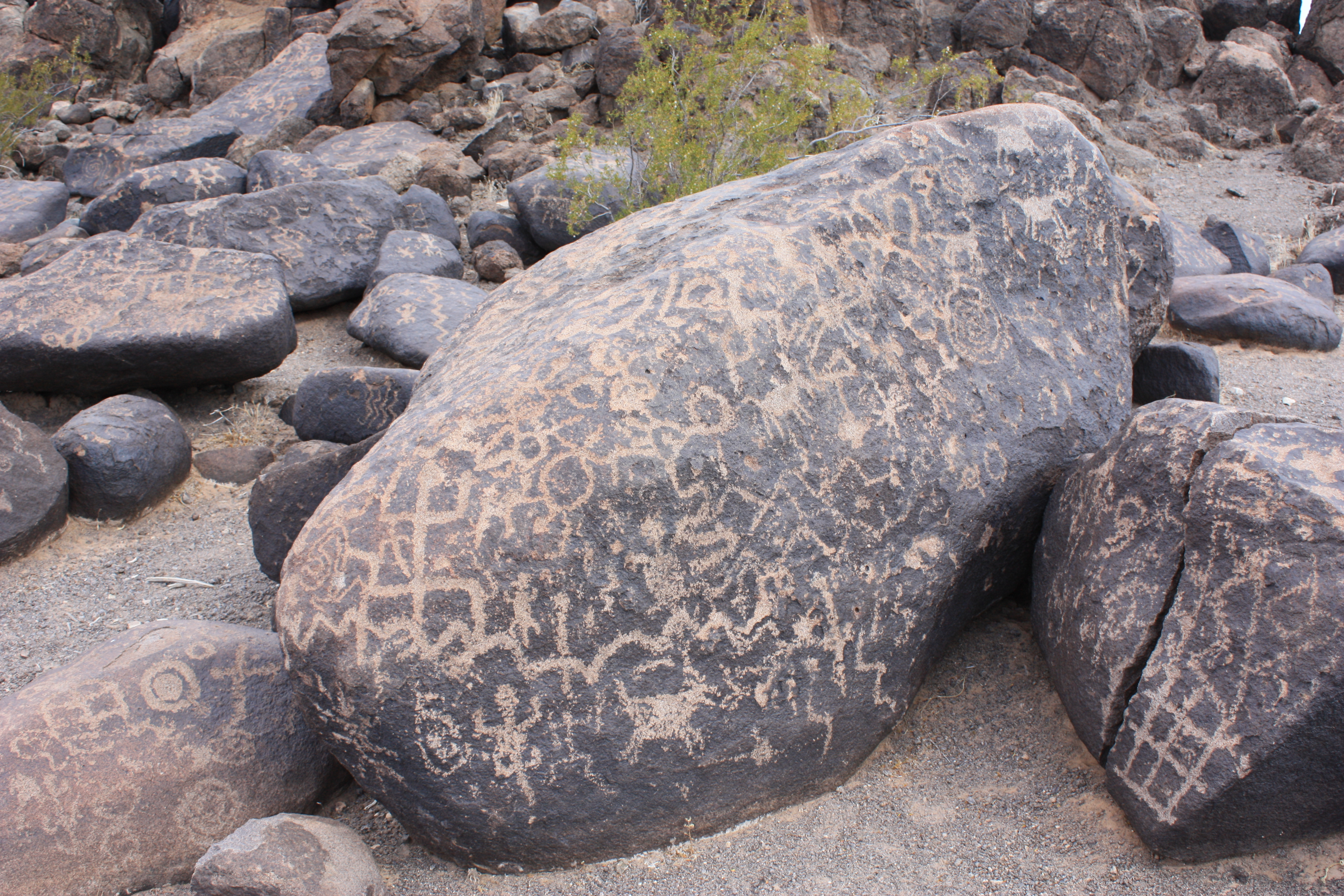
- Nearest city: Theba, Arizona
- Coordinates: 33°1′24″N 113°2′55″W
- Architectural style: Petroglyphs
- NRHP reference No.: 77000238
- Added to NRHP: November 25, 1977

The Painted Rock Petroglyph Site is a collection of hundreds of ancient petroglyphs near the town of Theba, Arizona, United States, listed on the National Register of Historic Places in 1977. The site is operated and maintained by the Bureau of Land Management (BLM), and includes an improved campground as well as an informative walking trail showcasing the petroglyphs.

Prior to 1989, the site was part of Painted Rock State Park, which included camping facilities on the nearby Painted Rock Reservoir, referred to as the "Lake Unit". When the state turned control of the park over to the BLM in 1989, the Lake Unit was closed due to concerns over pollutants in the Gila River and is not maintained by the BLM. Currently, there is no public access to Painted Rock Dam or the Lake Unit.

== History ==
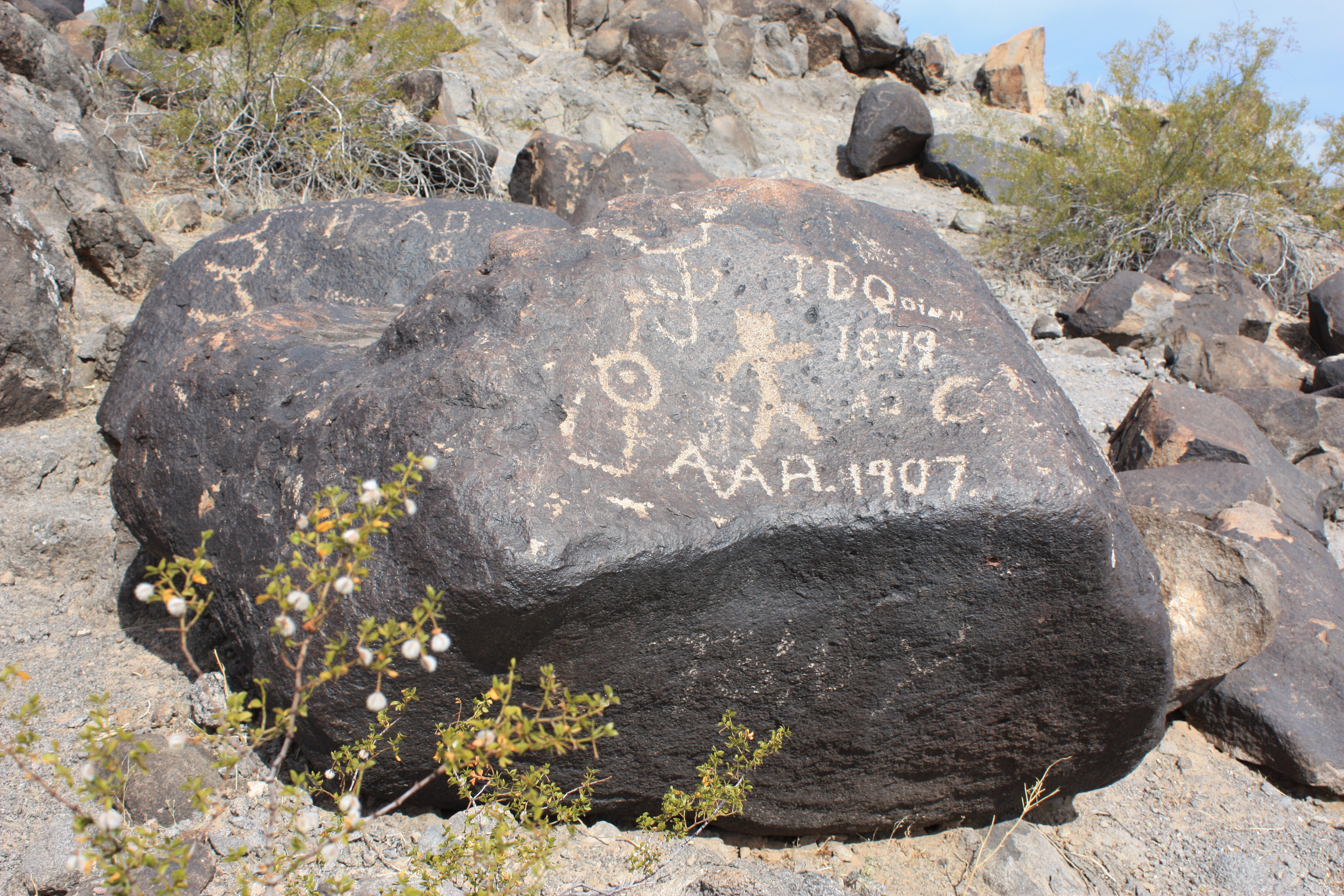
Inscriptions made by modern visitors are interspersed among the prehistoric petroglyphs.

The Painted Rock Petroglyph Site is located on the eastern edge of the Painted Rock Mountains about 18 miles (29 km) west by northwest of Gila Bend, Arizona. The area is mostly flat and sandy with May-Oct daytime temperatures above 100 °F (40 °C). The annual rainfall is only about 6 in (150 mm), the nearest irrigation water is the Gila River. In prehistoric times the Gila flowed west out of the mountains of western New Mexico, made a big dogleg turn at the town of Gila Bend and continued west to empty into the Colorado River. The Hohokam people lived and farmed here. Ruins of their late Pioneer Period (AD 350 - AD 550) and Early Colonial Period (AD 550 - AD 700) villages are found to the north and west, and ruins of their Sedentary - Classic Period (AD 900 - AD 1400) villages are found to the south and east.

Over forty petroglyph sites have been recorded in the area, however; most of these sites are small with only a few dozen petroglyphs. The Painted Rock Site is the largest known site with about 800 images. The petroglyphs are pecked onto weathered basalt boulders overlaying a granite outcrop. The outcrop is in the form of an east to west orientated oval about 400 feet (120 m) long, and about 20 feet (6 m) tall with two small knob tops. Most of the petroglyphs are concentrated on the boulders along the eastern edge, but the petroglyphs face in all directions from that edge.

Although considered a Hohokam rock art site, Painted Rock is on the extreme western edge of the Hohokam cultural area. East of Painted Rock, petroglyphs take on more typical Hohokam characteristics, while petroglyphs farther west take on more Patayan characteristics. Found here and in nearby areas of the Gila River are petroglyphs of Archaic origin. Painted Rock also bears the inscriptions of historic passers-by. Juan Bautista de Anza passed near here during his 1775-1776 expedition, followed by the Mormon Battalion in the 1840s, the Butterfield Overland Mail, and countless numbers of pioneers. During World War II, General George Patton used this area as headquarters for tank training.

== Similar petroglyphs ==
Fifteen miles up the Gila River in the Gila Bend Mountains there are similar ancient petroglyphs with stick figures with long, wavy headdresses and solid circles in the middle of their bodies. These are not common in other parts of the American Southwest.

Hohokam style petroglyphs can be found on Tumamoc Hill and Martinez Hill in Tucson, AZ. This style of petroglyphs consists of an assortment of lines and geometric patterns.

== Preservation efforts ==
The BLM maintains Painted Rock, paving roads and parking lots, posting informational signs, and maintaining camp sites and eating areas. In the 1990s, the BLM removed a large fence that surrounded Painted Rock and exchanged the fence for signs. Prior to the removal of the fence, people climbed on the rocks, and some rocks were even stolen. The signs seem to be somewhat effective in protecting the site, as there has been less vandalism since 2000, yet vandalism remains on many rocks. If tourism increases, there are concerns that the current management practices will not be enough to continue protecting Painted Rock.

The rocks experience natural weathering, and vandalism and tourism accelerate this natural process. Lichen are luckily not an issue for these rocks because of the hot and arid climate in Arizona. Calcium carbonate does not affect the petroglyphs, although it has been found at the base of some rocks below the petroglyphs. It is suspected that the presence of calcium carbonate at the base of some rocks is caused by erosion from foot traffic in the site. In greater quantities, calcium carbonate would increase weathering and cause deterioration. While other sites are greatly affected by lichen and calcium carbonate, the weathering at this site is mainly a result of wind and water.

Archaeology Southwest is a nonprofit organization in Tucson, AZ that works on conservation projects. This organization is working toward turning the Great Gila River Bend into a national monument. One of the reasons for wanting to turn the area into a national monument is researchers' desire to fully survey and inventory the region. Exact locations of sites and landmarks need to be mapped, and this should be completed soon because Phoenix is expanding. Continued population increase will put the petroglyphs at risk of destruction and vandalism.

The cliff side of the Great Bend provides natural protection to its petroglyphs because of its stable, basaltic composition. It is well-sheltered and difficult to access, which aid in preserving the petroglyphs, but it is open to the public. The site is currently classified as an "Area of Critical Environmental Concern" indicating that more protection needs to be established in order for the petroglyphs to be properly maintained.

== See also ==
- Cocoraque Butte Archaeological District
- History of Arizona
- Newspaper Rock State Historic Monument
