= Sentinel Plain volcanic field =

Landform in Yuma County, Arizona

Highest point
- Elevation: 160 m (520 ft)
- Coordinates: 32.8°N 113.2°W

Geography
- Location: Arizona, U.S.

Geology
- Rock age: 3.3 - 1.3 million years
- Mountain type: Volcanic field
- Volcanic zone: Basin and Range Province

Sentinel Plain volcanic field, also known as the Sentinel-Arlington volcanic field, is a monogenetic volcanic field in Arizona. The basalt is alkali.

== Notable Vents ==
Name	Elevation		Location	Last eruption
Name	meters	feet	Coordinates	Last eruption
Arlington Cone	-	-	33°00′36″N 112°42′48″W	

== See also ==
- Sentinel Plain
- List of volcanoes in the United States of America
- List of volcanic fields
