= Wintersburg, Arizona =

Unincorporated Community in Maricopa County, Arizona

- Unincorporated community Census-designated place
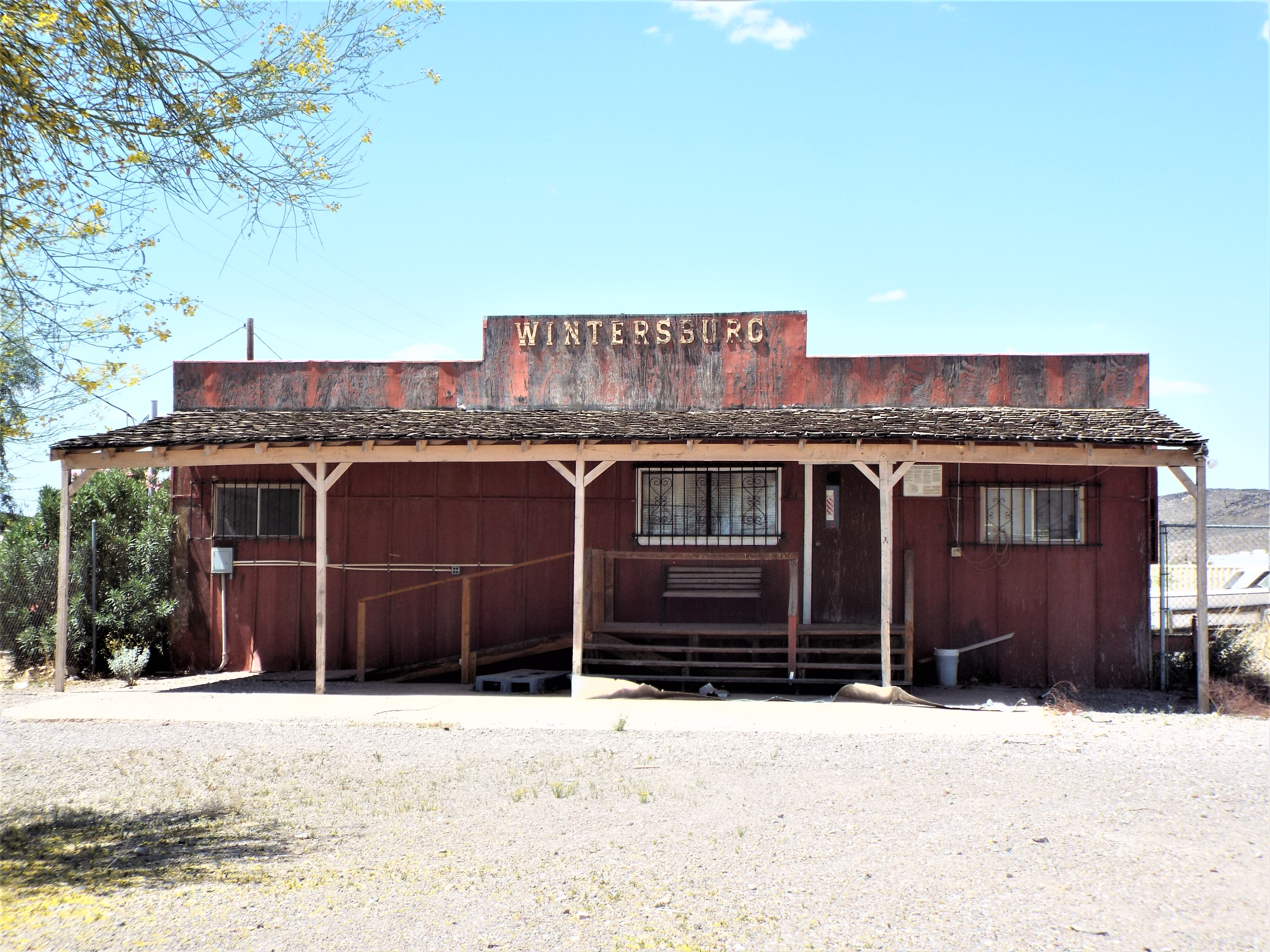
- Wintersburg Post Office – 1931

- Location in Maricopa County, Arizona

- Location within Arizona Location within the United States
- Coordinates: 33°25′28″N 112°52′15″W
- Country: United States
- State: Arizona
- County: Maricopa

Area
  - Total: 0.59 sq mi (1.53 km^{2})
  - Land: 0.59 sq mi (1.53 km^{2})
  - Water: 0 sq mi (0.00 km^{2})
- Elevation: 994 ft (303 m)

Population (2020)
  - Total: 51
  - Density: 86.1/sq mi (33.24/km^{2})
- Time zone: UTC-7 (Mountain (MST))
- ZIP code: 85354 (Tonopah)
- FIPS code: 04-84000
- GNIS feature ID: 2582908

Wintersburg is an unincorporated community and census-designated place in Maricopa County, Arizona, United States, located 48 miles (77 km) west of downtown Phoenix and 17 miles (27 km) west of Buckeye along Salome Highway. It is 4 miles (6 km) south of Exit 98 on Interstate 10. As of the 2020 census, Wintersburg had a population of 51, down from 136 in 2010.

Wintersburg is home to the Palo Verde Nuclear Generating Station, the largest nuclear power plant in the United States.

== Demographics ==
Historical population
Census	Pop.	Note	%±
2010	136		—
2020	51		−62.5%
U.S. Decennial Census

As of the census of 2010, there were 136 people living in the CDP. The population density was 274.5 people per square mile. The racial makeup of the CDP was 82% White, 2% Black or African American, 1% Native American, 2% Pacific Islander, and 12% from other races. 26% of the population were Hispanic or Latino of any race.

== Education ==
It is in the Saddle Mountain Unified School District.
