= Gila Bend Mountains =

Landform in Maricopa County, Arizona

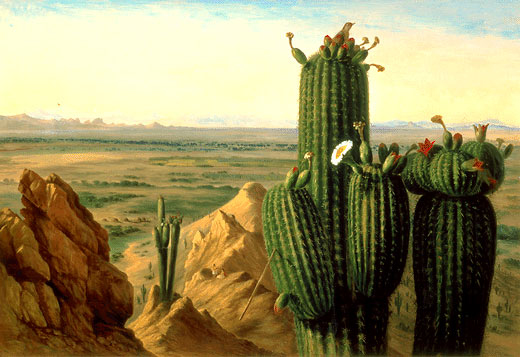
- view looking west-northwest from the Maricopa Mountains

Highest point
- Peak: Woolsey Peak
- Elevation: 3,170 ft (970 m)
- Coordinates: 33°10′02″N 112°53′08″W

Dimensions
- Length: 35 mi (56 km) E-W
- Width: 10 mi (16 km)

Geography
- Location within Arizona
- Country: United States
- State: Arizona
- Regions: Centennial Wash & Gila River; (Painted Rock Reservoir); ((north-central)-Sonoran Desert)
- County: Maricopa County
- Settlement(s): Gila Bend, Az–Arlington, AZ (Wintersburg, Az–Tonopah, AZ)

The Gila Bend Mountains are a 35-mile (56 km) long mountain range of the north-central Sonoran Desert southwest of Phoenix, Arizona and in southwest Maricopa County.

The Gila River of New Mexico and Arizona transects the entire state of Arizona, and the watershed covers about 65% of Arizona. The famous Gila Bend of the river changes the west-southwest flow to south-flowing, then back to west-flowing. Painted Rock Reservoir and the Dendora Valley are nestled at the south of the Gila Bend Mountains, the monolith which causes the diversion of the Gila Bend. Gila Bend, Arizona is located at the southeast of the bend, on Interstate 8.

Centennial Wash borders the north of the range and has its junction with the Gila River in the Arlington State Wildlife Area.

== Peaks, and landforms ==
The highest elevation in the mountains is Woolsey Peak at 3,170 feet (966 m), in the range's center-east. Two peaks are slightly west. In the north-center, Signal Peak, at 2,182 feet (665 m), anchors the center of the small Signal Mountain Wilderness. The peak south is Bunyan Peat at 2,410 feet (735 m). Bunyan and Woolsey Peak slightly east are part of the larger Woolsey Peak Wilderness. Bunyan Peak is located at 33.1142°N 112.9652°W. Woolsey Peak is located at 33.167266°N 112.9652°W. The closest access town to Woolsey Peak is Arlington, Arizona.

== See also ==
- List of mountain ranges of Maricopa County, Arizona
