= List of mountain ranges of Maricopa County, Arizona =

A list of mountain ranges of Maricopa County, Arizona.

== Alphabetical list ==
- Belmont Mountains–Maricopa County
- Big Horn Mountains (Arizona)–Maricopa County
- Crater Range–Maricopa County
- Eagletail Mountains–Maricopa County
- Gila Bend Mountains–Maricopa County
- Goldfield Mountains–Maricopa County
- Harquahala Mountains–E. La Paz County -- (W. Maricopa County)
- Hieroglyphic Mountains–Maricopa County -- (some in S. Yavapai County)
- Maricopa Mountains–Maricopa County
- Mazatzal Mountains–Southeast Yavapai County -- (and N. Maricopa, W. Gila County)
- McDowell Mountains–Maricopa County
- Painted Rock Mountains–Maricopa County
- Phoenix Mountains–Maricopa County
- Sand Tank Mountains–Maricopa County
- Sierra Estrella–Maricopa County
- Salt River Mountains–Maricopa County
- South Mountains (Arizona)–Maricopa County
- Usery Mountains–Maricopa County -- (See: Usery Mountain Recreation Area.)
- Vulture Mountains–Maricopa County
- White Tank Mountains–Maricopa County
- Wickenburg Mountains–Southern Yavapai County -- (and N. Maricopa County)

== See also ==
- List of mountain ranges of the Sonoran Desert
