= Bat Canyon =

Landform in Apache County, Arizona

Coordinates: 36.1017°N 109.3459°W

Bat Canyon is a valley in Apache County, Arizona.

The canyon is at an elevation of 5,892 feet or 1,795.8 meters.

The canyon's name comes from the Native Americans of the area, who saw many bats near a local rock formation (Navajo: jaá abaní há atiin, "bat trail").
