= Big Horn Mountains Wilderness =

Protected area in Maricopa County, Arizona

- IUCN category Ib (wilderness area)
- Location within the United States
- Location: Maricopa County, Arizona, U.S.
- Nearest city: Phoenix, Arizona
- Coordinates: 33.6152362°N 113.1398282°W
- Area: 21,000 acres (8,500 ha)
- Established: 1990
- Governing body: Bureau of Land Management

The Big Horn Mountains Wilderness is a wilderness area located in central Arizona, USA, within the arid Sonora Desert. The wilderness lies midway between Phoenix and Quartzsite. Consisting of 21,000 acres, it was established by the United States Congress in 1990.

== Geography and features ==
The area contains 9 miles of the Big Horn Mountains, which form the center core of the wilderness. The mountains are surrounded by desert plains. The most prominent peak is Big Horn Mountain, which rises 1,800 feet (550 m) above the desert, other peaks include Burnt Mountain and Little Horn Peak. Activities include hiking, camping, rock climbing, photography, and nature study. Just to the northeast lies the Hummingbird Springs Wilderness.

== Flora and fauna ==
The area is inhabited by several indigenous mammals and birds. These include bighorn sheep, gila monsters, kit foxes, desert tortoises, golden eagles, prairie falcons, barn owls and great horned owls.

== See also ==
- List of Arizona Wilderness Areas
- List of U.S. Wilderness Areas
- National Wilderness Preservation System
- Wilderness Act
