= Painted Rock Dam =

Dam in Maricopa County, Arizona, United States

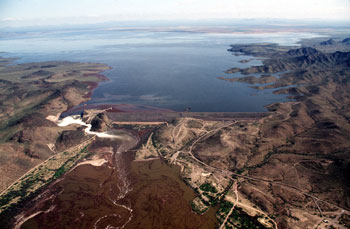
- Photo taken during period of high runoff, with the resultant reservoir completely full and verging the emergency spillway

- Location within Arizona
- Official name: Painted Rock Dam
- Location: Maricopa County, Arizona, United States
- Coordinates: 33°4′22″N 113°0′56″W
- Construction began: 25 July 1957; 69 years ago
- Opening date: 18 January 1960; 66 years ago
- Construction cost: $13,670,000
- Operator: United States Army Corps of Engineers

Dam and spillways
- Impounds: Gila River
- Height: 181 feet (55 m)
- Length: 4,780 feet (1,460 m)

Reservoir
- Creates: Painted Rock Reservoir
- Total capacity: 2,491,700 acre-feet (3.0735×10^{9} m^{3})

The Painted Rock Dam is an earthfill embankment dam located west of Gila Bend, Arizona. It is primarily used for flood control purposes.

== Description ==
Painted Rock Dam was constructed during a 3-year period from 1957 to 1960 by the United States Army Corps of Engineers to help control seasonal floods on the lower reaches of the Gila River. The river had no significant impediments between the Colorado River and the Coolidge Dam hundreds of miles upstream. In this stretch the river receives several tributaries, including the Hassayampa, Agua Fria rivers, and most importantly the Salt River and its major tributary, the Verde River. Due to a relatively large watershed of 50,800 square miles (132,000 km^{2}), more than half of which is unregulated, the flood threat to small farming communities downstream on the Gila River is large, and seasonal flooding of these areas prior to the construction of the dam was significant.

The area surrounding the dam has also hosted a number of historical events. The Butterfield Overland Mail route passed through the area, as did the path followed by the Mormon Battalion. Evidence of both can be found, as well as the expedition of Juan Bautista De Anza in 1774. Inscriptions made by these groups can be found in various sites in the region.

Near the dam site, there is also a campground maintained by the Bureau of Land Management that showcases a number of prehistoric petroglyphs, indicating human involvement in the region long predating Western influence. It is from the Painted Rock Petroglyph Site that the area and the dam get their names.

Painted Rock Reservoir
- Location within Arizona
- Location: Arizona
- Coordinates: 33°4′22″N 113°0′56″W
- Type: reservoir
- Primary inflows: Gila River
- Primary outflows: Gila River, evaporation
- Catchment area: 50,800 sq mi (132,000 km^{2})
- Basin countries: United States
- Surface area: 53,200 acres (215 km^{2}) (maximum)
- Max. depth: 181 ft (55 m)
- Water volume: 2,491,700 acre⋅ft (3.0735 km^{3}) (maximum)
- Surface elevation: 661 ft (201 m)

The lake and reservoir were dry as of August 2009 and closed to the public due to contamination of pesticide run off. This is in stark contrast to the level of upkeep during the 1990s. The state was forced to abandon the campground and the area is marked "NO TRESPASSING". No hunting, hiking, or camping is allowed. The Army Corps of Engineers maintains the property.

== Painted Rock Reservoir ==
Painted Rock Reservoir is an artificial reservoir impounded by the Painted Rock Dam. The reservoir, with a maximum storage capacity of 2,491,700 acre-feet (3.1 km^{3}), has the potential to be the second largest reservoir entirely within the borders of the state of Arizona, but because the Gila River and its main tributary, the Salt River, are generally almost always completely diverted for irrigation and municipal water use for Phoenix, the lake is often dry.

In 2005, heavy rain filled the reservoir to record levels, swelling the lake to become the second largest by area in the state of Arizona, trailing only Theodore Roosevelt Lake. However, extremely high levels of pesticides, particularly the banned DDT, had built up in the farmlands upstream from the reservoir in the decades prior and accumulated in the lake during the flood. The toxicity of the lake rendered it unsuitable for recreational uses and public access to both the lake and the dam was restricted. Similar runoff had filled the lake in 1980 and 1993, in each instance persisting only a few months before emptying due through evaporation, downstream releases, and infiltration.

== Displacement of Native Americans ==
Water impounded by the Painted Rock Dam caused the flooding of about 10,000 acres (4,000 ha) of the Tohono O'odham's Gila Bend Reservation. The flooding destroyed a 750 acres (300 ha) tribal farm and several communities. Residents were relocated to a 40 acres (16 ha) parcel called San Lucy Village, Arizona. In 1986, the federal government and the Nation approved a settlement in which the Nation agreed to give up its legal claims in exchange for $30,000,000 and the right to add up to 10,000 acres (4,000 ha) of newly purchased land to its Reservation.

== See also ==
- Painted Rock Petroglyph Site
