= Tonopah, Arizona =

CDP in Maricopa County, Arizona

- Census-designated place
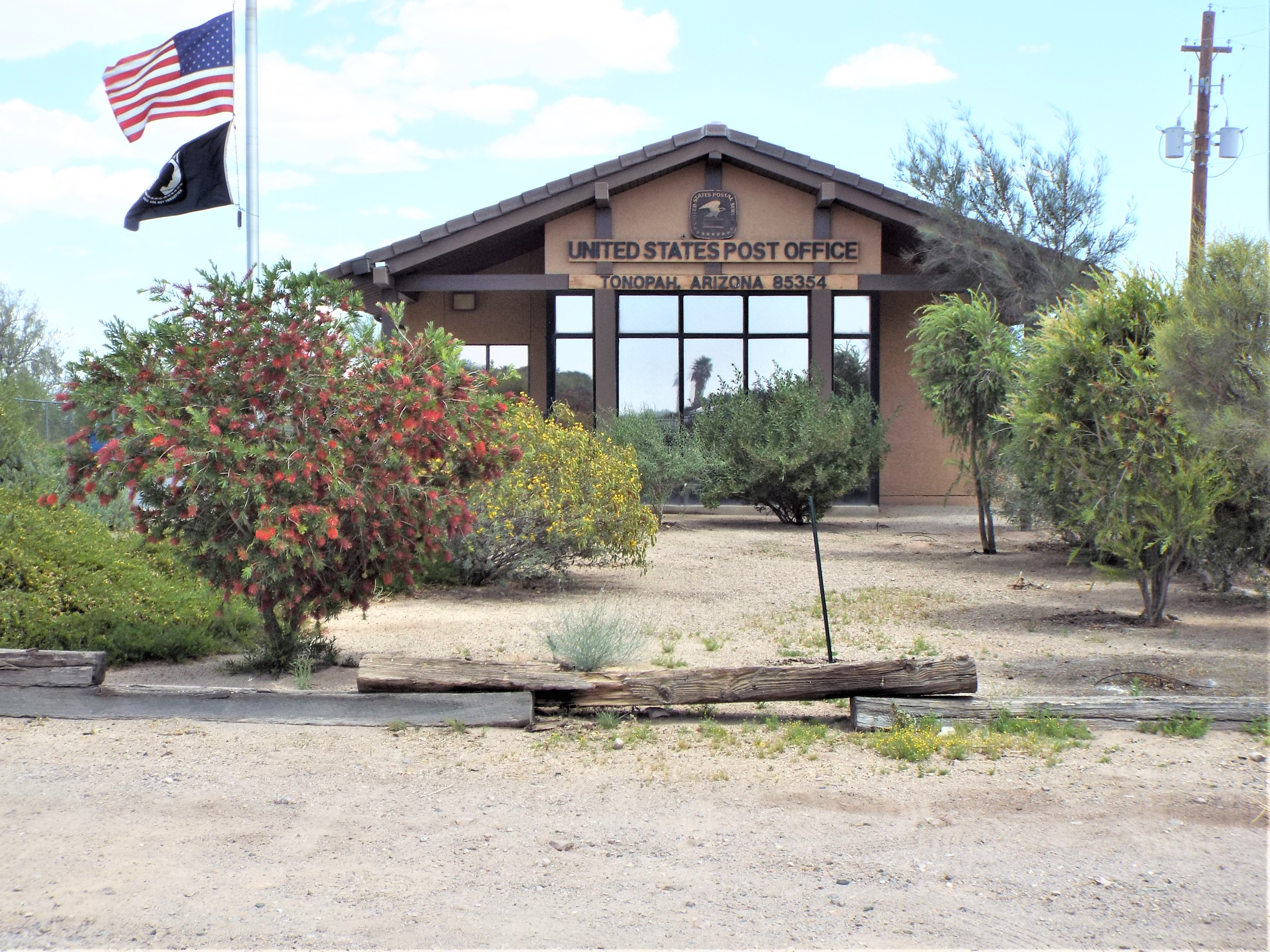
- Tonopah Post Office

- Location of Tonopah in Maricopa County, Arizona.

- Location in Arizona Location in the United States
- Coordinates: 33°29′37″N 112°56′14″W
- Country: United States
- State: Arizona
- County: Maricopa
- Established: 1929

Area
  - Total: 1.37 sq mi (3.54 km^{2})
  - Land: 1.37 sq mi (3.54 km^{2})
  - Water: 0 sq mi (0.00 km^{2})
- Elevation: 1,490 ft (450 m)

Population (2010)
  - Total: 1,380
  - Estimate (2016): N/A
- Time zone: UTC-7 (MST)
  - Summer (DST): N/A
- ZIP code: 85354
- Area code(s): 623 and 928
- FIPS code: 04-74540

Tonopah /ˈtoʊnoʊˌpɑː/ is a census-designated place in western Maricopa County, Arizona, United States, approximately 50 miles (80 km) west of downtown Phoenix off Interstate 10. The community is near the Palo Verde Nuclear Generating Station, the largest power producer in the country, nuclear or otherwise.

It is located on the Tonopah Desert. Many wells in Tonopah are warm, in the 70 °F (21 °C) to 95 °F (35 °C) range and many are hot; 110 °F (43 °C) to 120 °F (49 °C) wells are common. Prior to being called Tonopah, the settlement was known as Lone Peak.

The area is also known to have been inhabited by groups of people for resource gathering area of the Hohokam, Patayan, and Yavapai Indians.

== Demographics ==
Historical population
Census	Pop.	Note	%±
U.S. Decennial Census

As of the census of 2010, there were 60 people living in the CDP. The population density was 1.13 people per square mile. The racial makeup of the CDP was 87% White, 2% Native American, 3% Asian, and 8% from other races. 23% of the population were Hispanic or Latino of any race.

== Schools ==
- Crossroads Academy
- Ruth Fisher Middle School
- Tonopah Valley High School
- Winters Well Elementary School
- Harquahala Valley School (Abandoned)

== Incorporation efforts ==
In 2009, a political action committee named Tonopah United for Our Future (TUFF) filed paperwork with the county, proposing the incorporation of the area into a town. The proposal ran into difficulties when the neighboring town of Buckeye voted to publicly oppose the measure. State law forbids the incorporation of a new city or town within a specified distance of existing municipalities without their approval, and the proposed boundaries for Tonopah would abut the corporate boundaries of Buckeye, essentially giving Buckeye veto power over any incorporation efforts. In 2003, Buckeye had passed a measure approving of any future incorporation effort by Tonopah, but the current town council rescinded the measure, citing concerns that the proposal would extend the new town's boundaries east of the Hassayampa River and into area Buckeye intends to annex. Council members did indicate that they were open to future incorporation efforts using the river as a boundary.

Residents also expressed concern that the proposal was too ambitious and that the new town would be incapable of managing the 100 square miles (260 km^{2}) of land included in the proposal. Geographically it would be among the largest in the state, while estimates placed the population of the proposed town at approximately 6,000. Additionally, a number of residents opposed the plan because they believed large tax increases would be necessary to fund a new government.

Ultimately the measure was defeated on March 10, 2009, by a vote of 523 against incorporation versus 356 in support.

== Belmont ==
In November 2017, media outlets reported that a company associated with billionaire Bill Gates purchased 24,800 acres (100 km^{2}) between Buckeye and Tonopah for $80 million. Gates's company plans to create a "smart city" called Belmont on the site.

== Climate ==
Climate data for Tonopah, Arizona (Elevation 1,300ft)
Month	Jan	Feb	Mar	Apr	May	Jun	Jul	Aug	Sep	Oct	Nov	Dec	Year
Record high °F (°C)	82 (28)	91 (33)	98 (37)	105 (41)	115 (46)	121 (49)	119 (48)	117 (47)	113 (45)	104 (40)	94 (34)	87 (31)	121 (49)
Mean daily maximum °F (°C)	65.7 (18.7)	70.7 (21.5)	76.0 (24.4)	85.5 (29.7)	94.4 (34.7)	103.8 (39.9)	106.8 (41.6)	104.5 (40.3)	99.2 (37.3)	88.3 (31.3)	75.4 (24.1)	66.2 (19.0)	86.4 (30.2)
Mean daily minimum °F (°C)	36.8 (2.7)	40.1 (4.5)	43.4 (6.3)	50.5 (10.3)	59.7 (15.4)	67.9 (19.9)	77.0 (25.0)	75.6 (24.2)	67.1 (19.5)	55.1 (12.8)	43.2 (6.2)	36.5 (2.5)	54.4 (12.4)
Record low °F (°C)	17 (−8)	22 (−6)	23 (−5)	26 (−3)	41 (5)	49 (9)	60 (16)	54 (12)	42 (6)	35 (2)	16 (−9)	14 (−10)	14 (−10)
Average precipitation inches (mm)	1.08 (27)	0.88 (22)	0.75 (19)	0.27 (6.9)	0.05 (1.3)	0.06 (1.5)	0.62 (16)	1.18 (30)	0.57 (14)	0.44 (11)	0.61 (15)	1.13 (29)	7.63 (194)
Average snowfall inches (cm)	0 (0)	0 (0)	0 (0)	0 (0)	0 (0)	0 (0)	0 (0)	0 (0)	0 (0)	0 (0)	0 (0)	0 (0)	0 (0)
Source: The Western Regional Climate Center

== Hot springs ==
There are natural hot springs located in the Tonopah region. Archaeological artifacts have been found nearby that are attributed to the Shoshone and Paiute peoples and their descendants. In 1845 the explorer, John C. Fremont wrote that the hot springs had been used by native peoples.

== In popular culture ==
The chorus of the song "Willin'" by Lowell George of Little Feat on the albums Little Feat, Sailin' Shoes and Waiting for Columbus refers to either Tonopah, Arizona or Tonopah, Nevada:

And I've been from Tucson to Tucumcari, Tehachapi to Tonopah.

I've driven every kind of rig that's ever been made;

driven the backroads so I wouldn't get weighed.

== Image gallery ==
Pictured are the following images related to Tonopah:

- The ruins of the house of John Beauchamp, a major landowner in the area and Tonopah's first postmaster. The Beauchamp homestead house was built in 1920. The ruins of the house are located near the corner of Indian School and 411th Avenue .
- The former Saguaro Sanitarium, now the Motel Saguaro Mineral Wells, whose groundbreaking ceremony was officially dedicated on June 17, 1934, and attended by George W.P. Hunt, the first elected governor of Arizona.
- The ruins related to the Tonopah-Belmont mine workers camp.
Tonopah

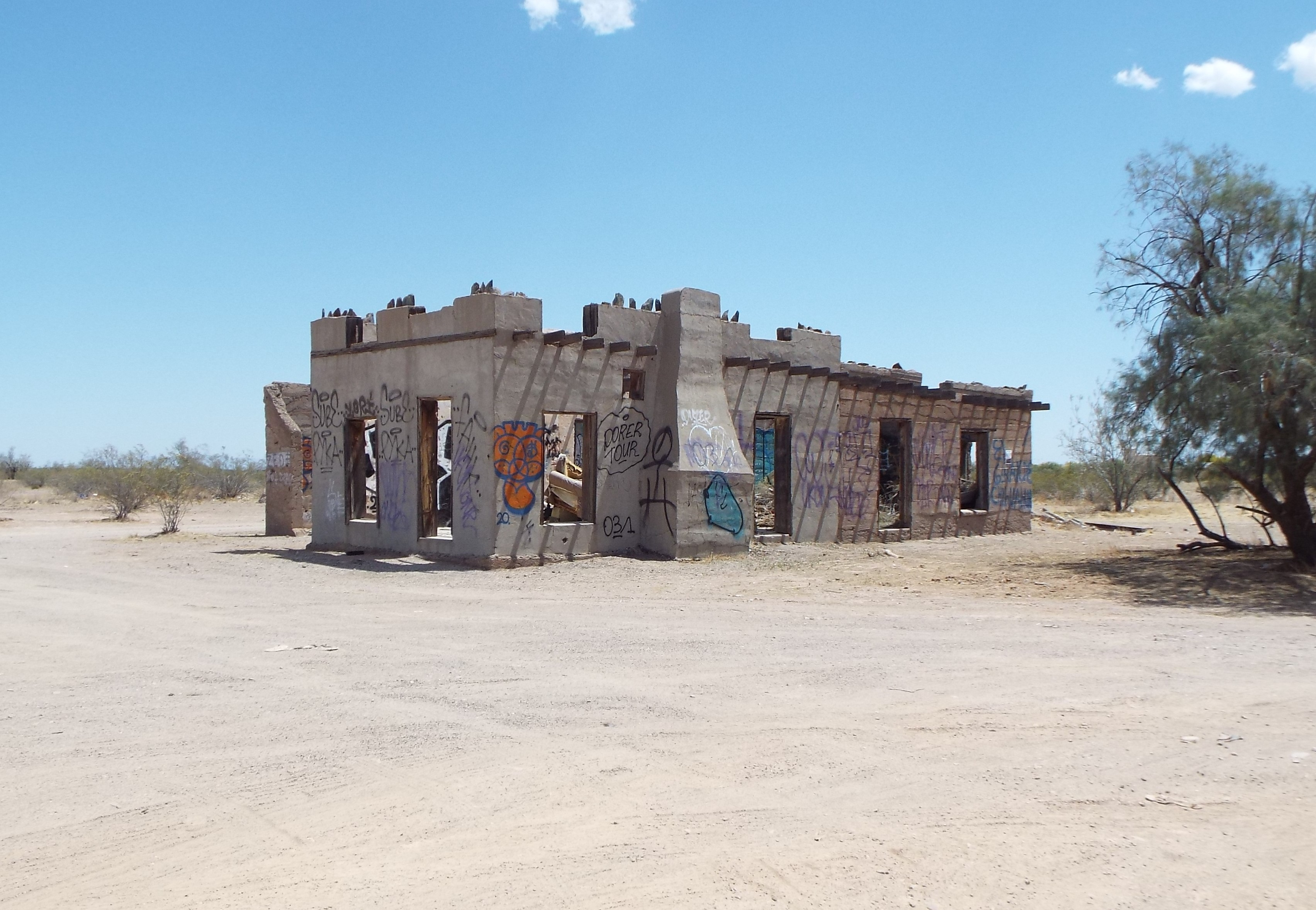
John Beauchamp House-1920

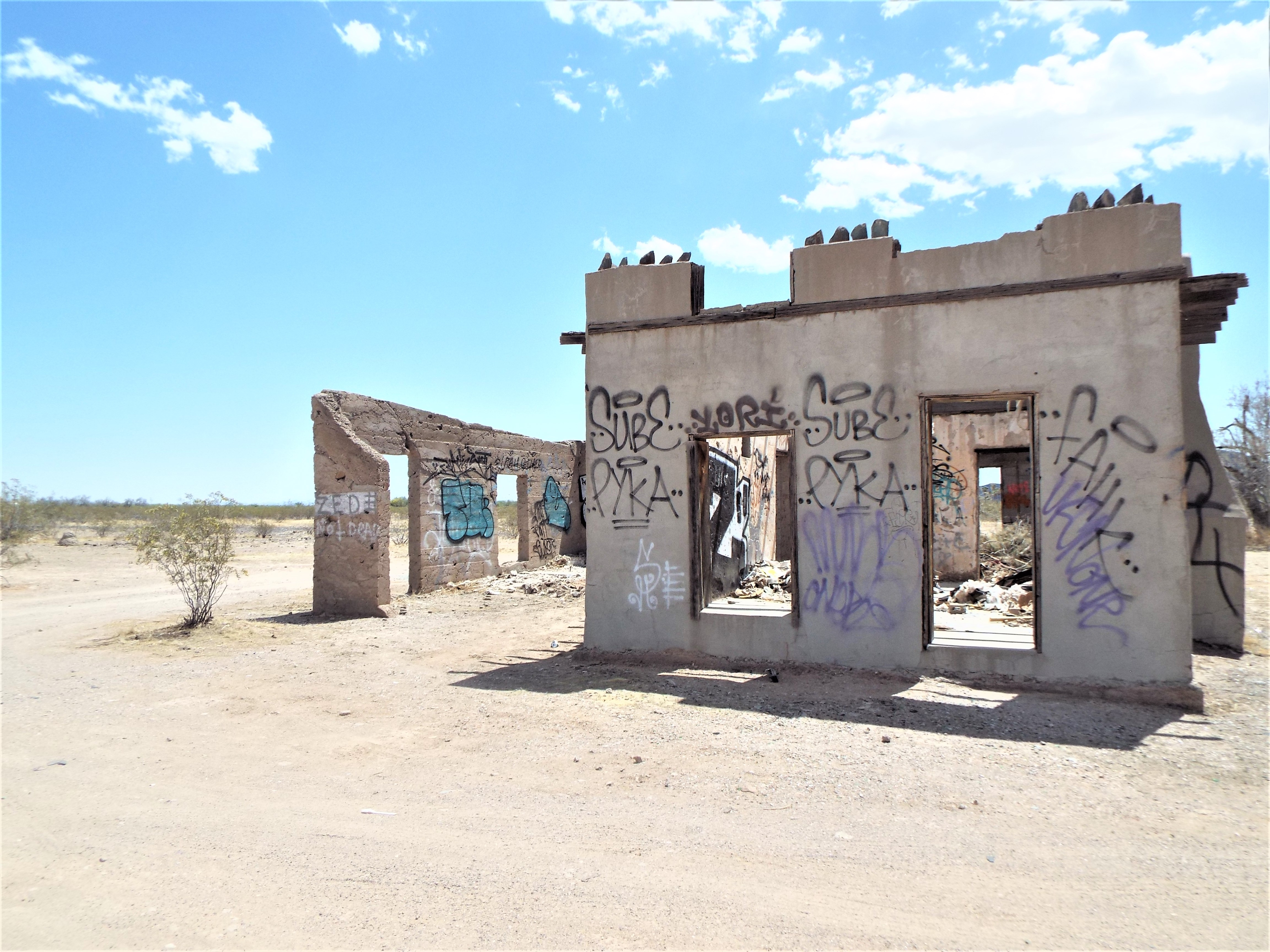
John Beauchamp House

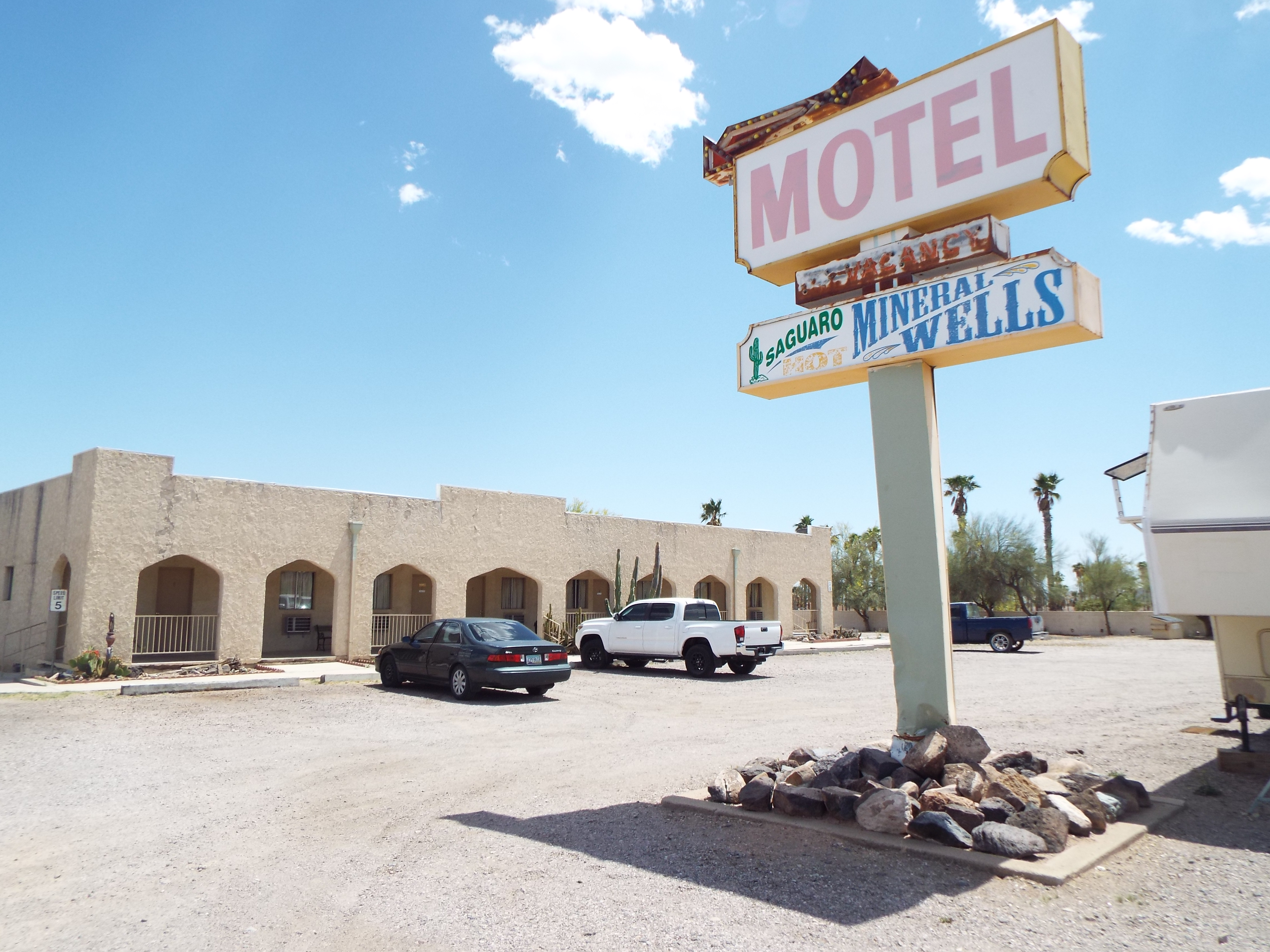
Motel Saguaro Mineral Wells

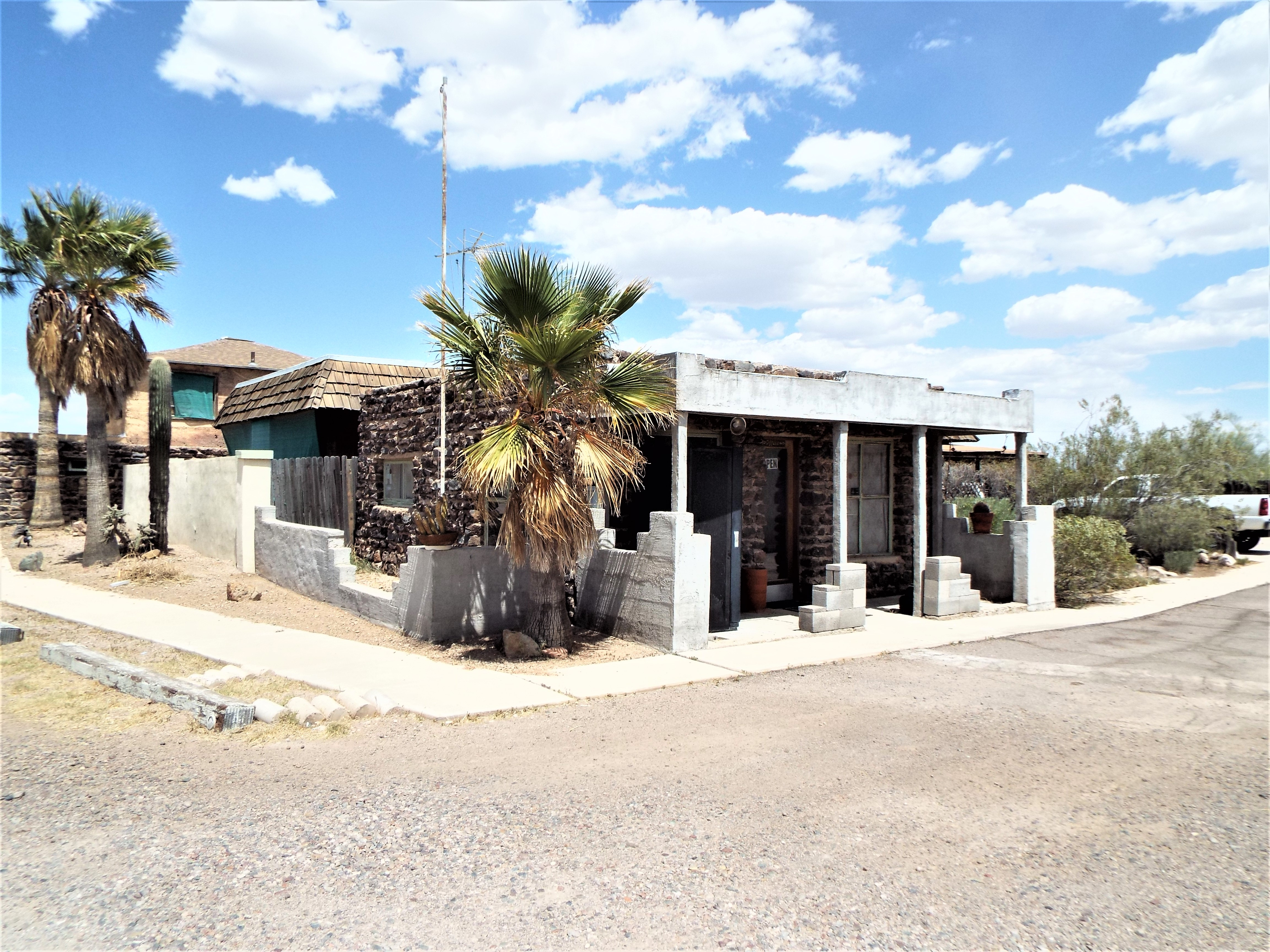
Motel Saguaro Mineral Wells office

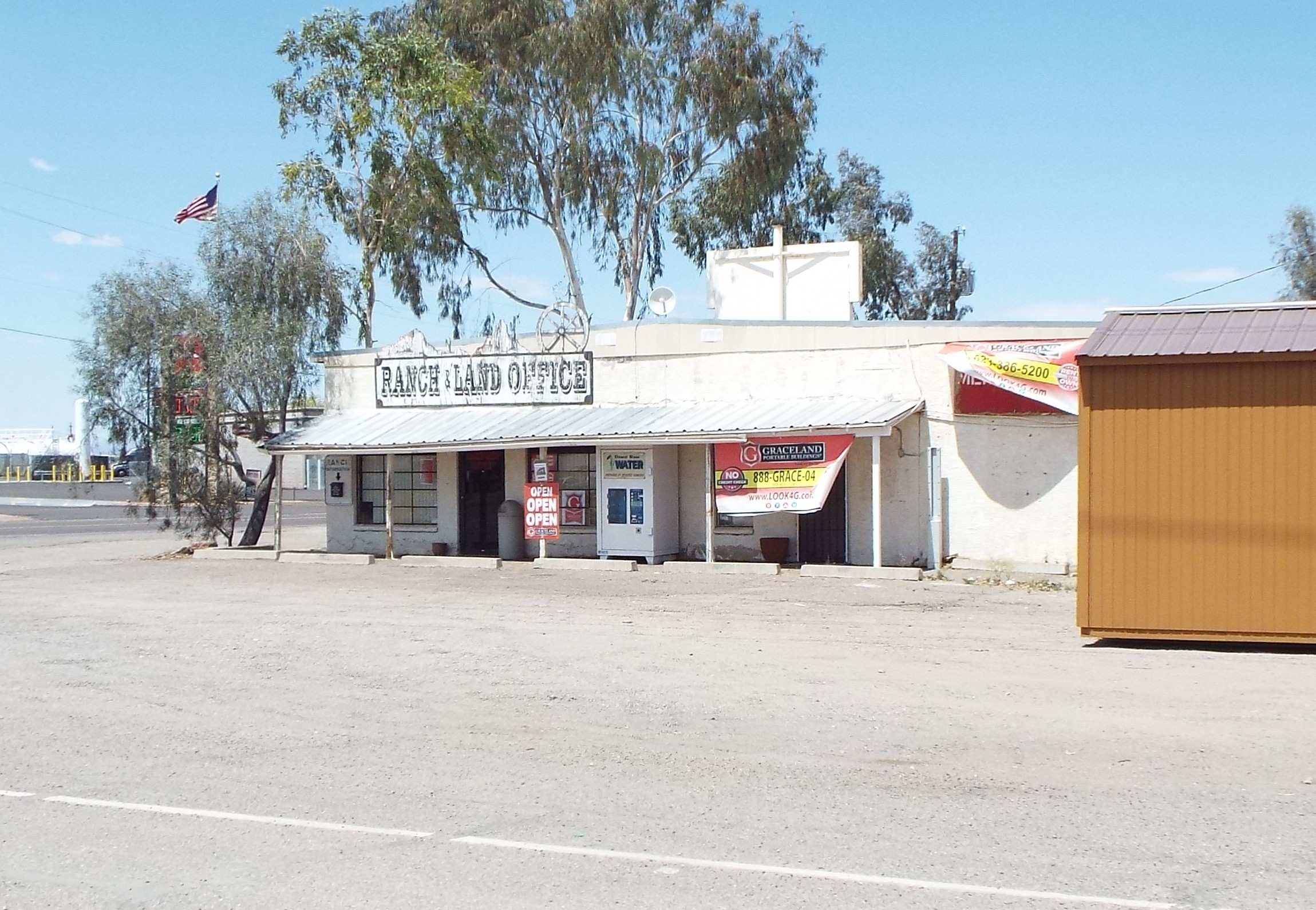
Tonopah Ranch and Land Office

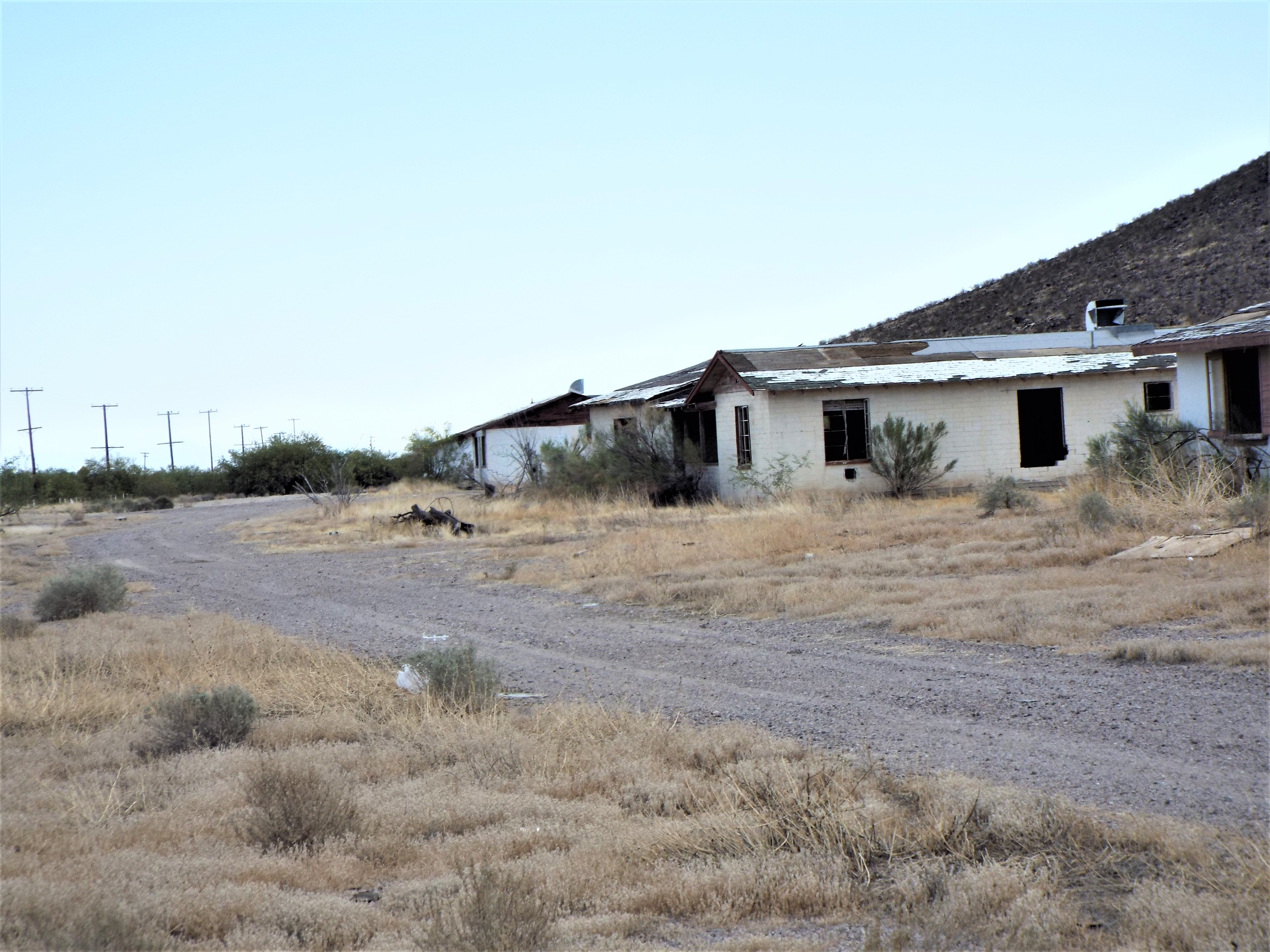
Tonopah-Belmont mine ruins

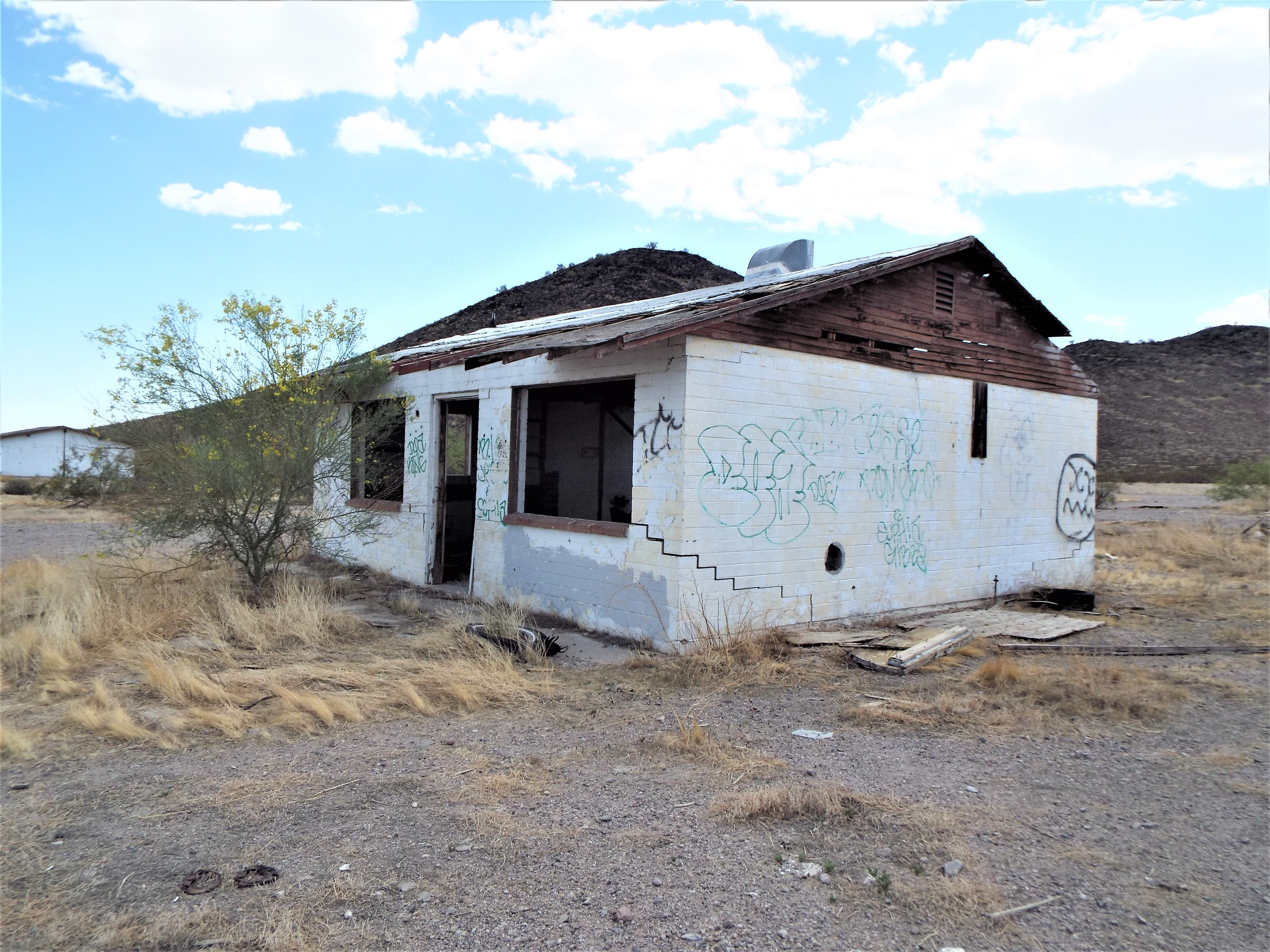
Tonopah-Belmont mine ruins

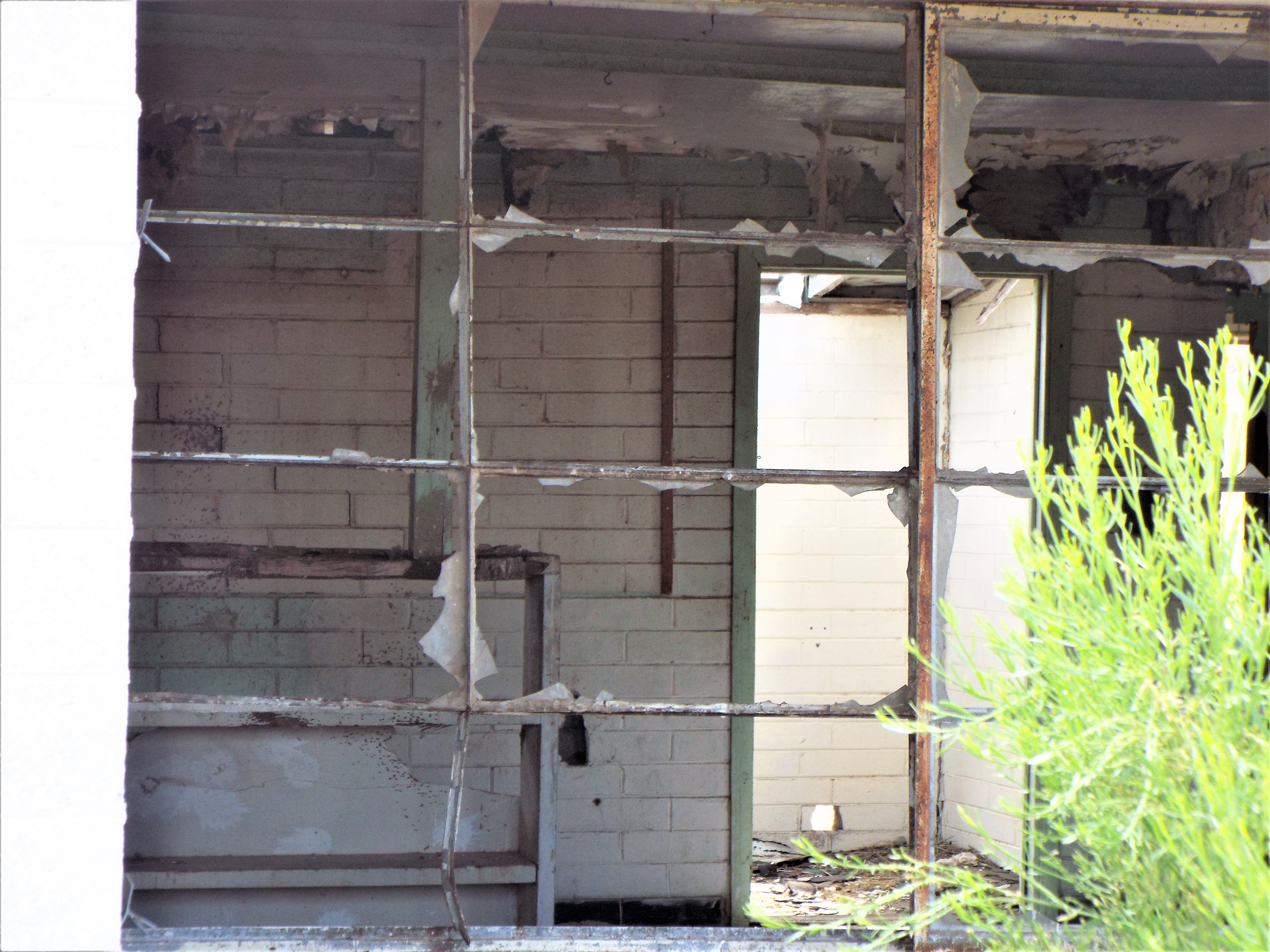
Tonopah-Belmont mine ruins

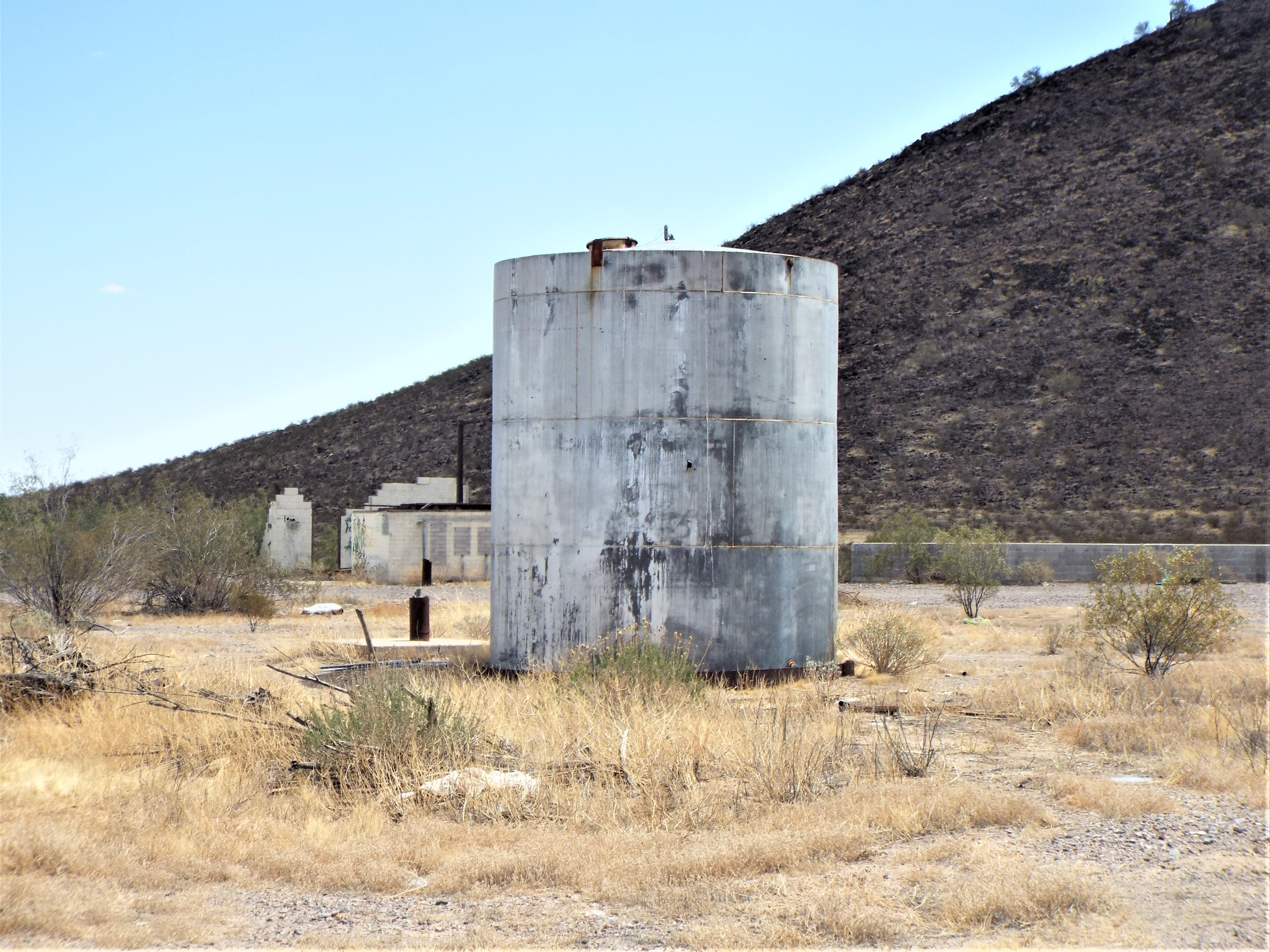
Tonopah Ruins Water Tank

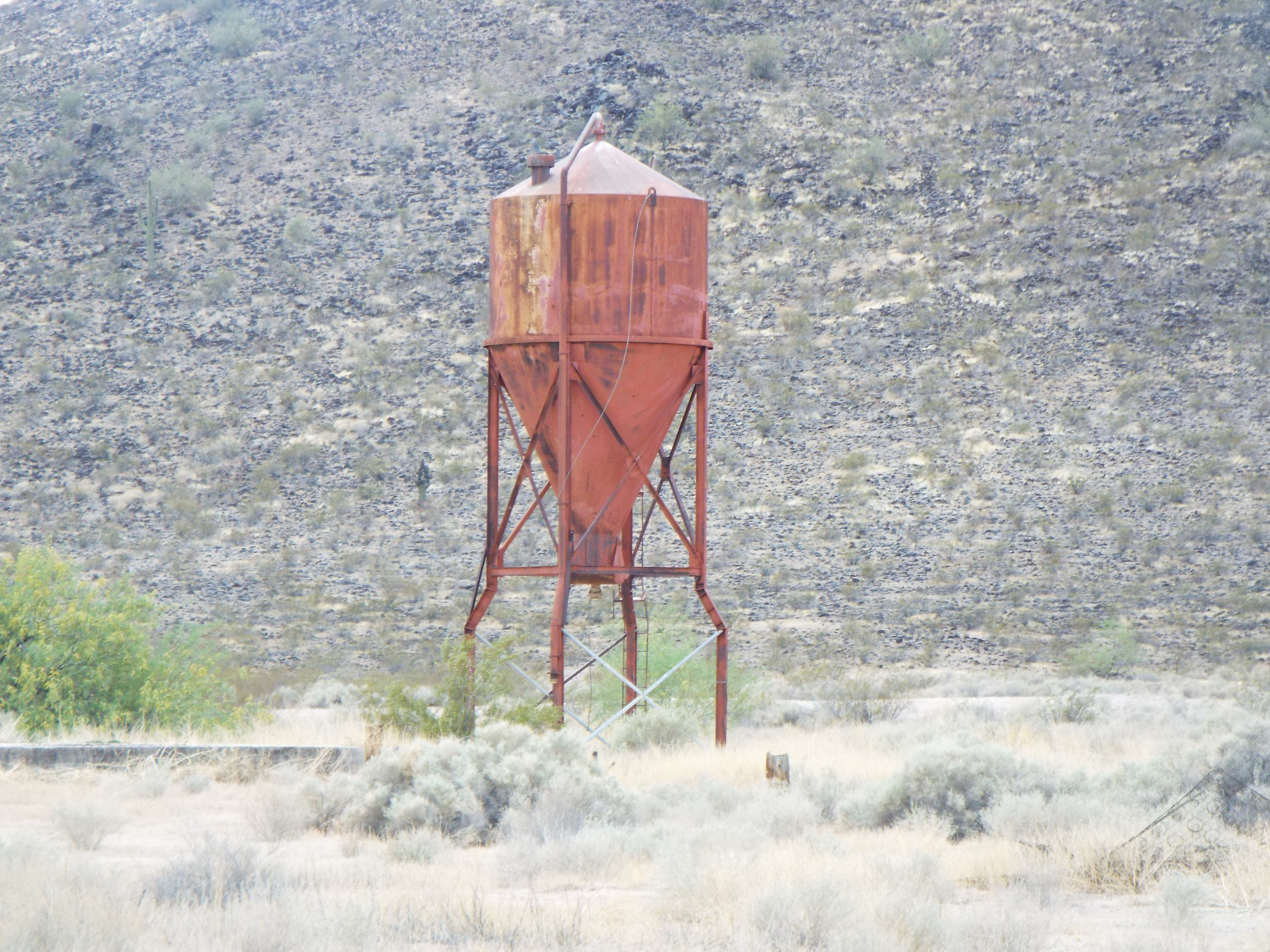
Tonopah-Belmont mine ruins

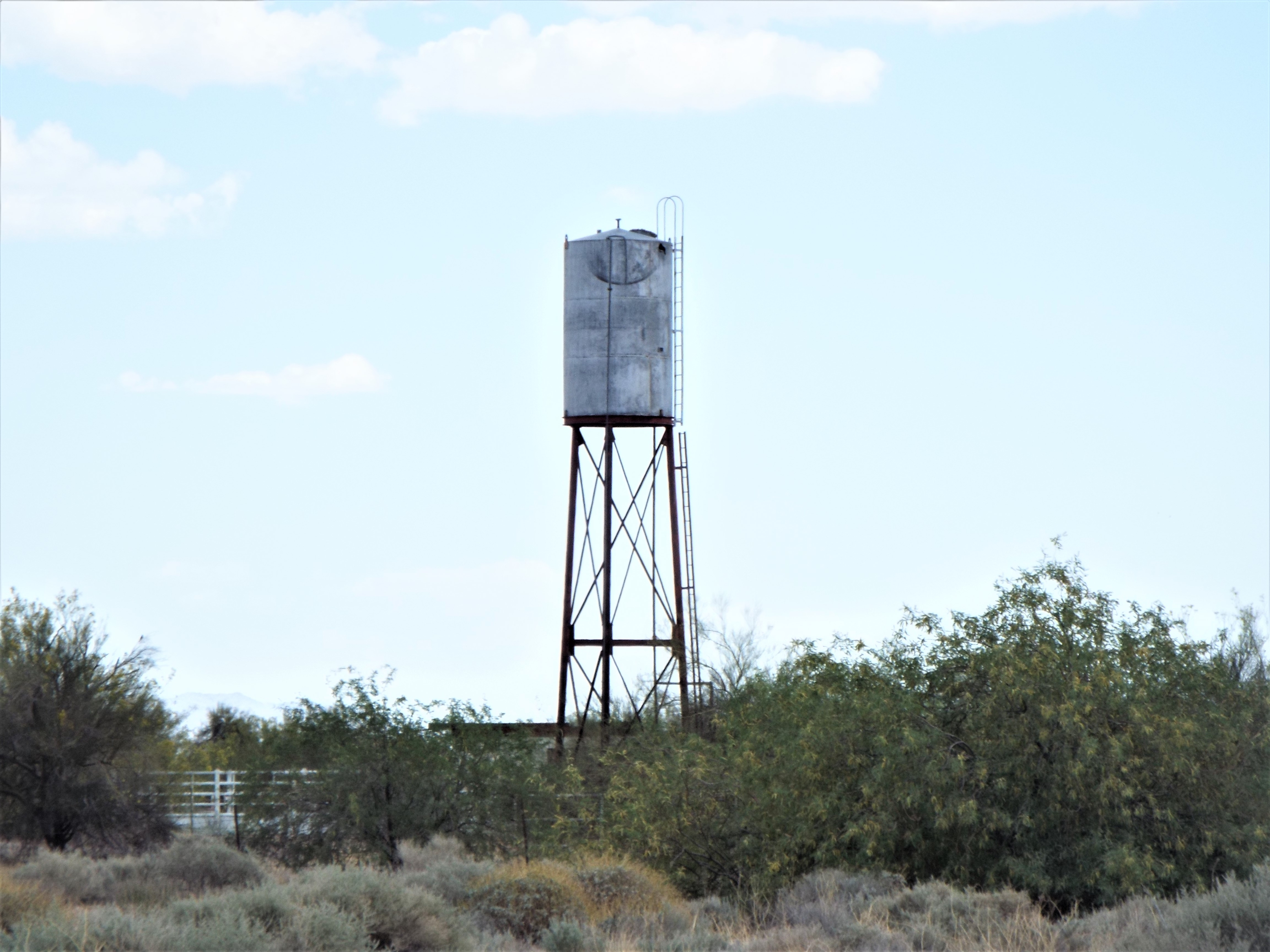
Tonopah Water Tower
