= Ajo =

Ajo, Ajó, or AJO may refer to:

== Places ==
- Ajo, Arizona, a census-designated place in Pima County, Arizona, US
  - Ajo Peak, a mountain peak in southern Arizona
  - Little Ajo Mountains, a mountain range in southern Arizona
  - Ajo Unified School District
  - Ajo High School
  - Ajo Air Force Station, a closed US Air Force General Surveillance Radar station in southern Arizona
  - Ajo Copper News, a weekly community newspaper serving western Pima County, Arizona
- Ajo, Cantabria, the capital of Bareyo municipality in Cantabria, Spain
- Mar de Ajó, a coastal city in Buenos Aires Province, Argentina
- Ajó, an alternate name for General Lavalle, a town in Buenos Aires Province, Argentina

== People ==
- Aki Ajo (born 1968), Finnish motorcycle racer
  - Ajo Motorsport, a motorcycle racing team named after Aki Ajo
- Niklas Ajo (born 1994), Finnish motorcycle racer, eldest son of Aki Ajo

== Other uses ==
- Finlandia-Ajo, an annual Group One harness event
- Corona Municipal Airport, which has the location identifier AJO
- AcademicJobsOnline.org, a recruitment service for higher education, founded by the mathematics department at Duke University
