= Ajo Peak =

Landform in Pima County, Arizona

- Location within Arizona Location within the United States

Highest point
- Elevation: 2,619 ft (798 m) NAVD 88
- Coordinates: 32°20′08″N 112°54′24″W

Geography
- Location: Pima County, Arizona, U.S.
- Parent range: Little Ajo Mountains
- Topo map: USGS Chico Shunie

Ajo Peak (O'odham: S-vepegĭ moʼokam or To:lo Vipidoḍ We:co) is a mountain peak in southern Arizona, in the north-and-east Sonoran Desert. Two peaks are nearby, Cardigan Peak at 2,922 feet (891 m) and North Ajo Peak 2,776 feet (846 m).

The mountain peak, located about 12 miles (19 km) north of Organ Pipe Cactus National Monument reaches 2,619 feet (798 m) in height.

Ajo, Arizona in the central-east of the mountains; (named in Spanish for garlic), is the access point for the entire central areas of the Little Ajo Mountains, including Ajo Peak.

== Water divide mountain range ==
Ajo Peak as part of the Little Ajo Mountains forms part of a water divide, and splits into three directions – (a "Triple Divide"), part of two drainages. The Growler Valley and the San Cristobal Wash Drainage go south-west-north from the Ajo Peaks; also northwest; these two directions skirt the Little Ajo and Growler Mountain ranges. The second drainage goes from the northeast, is northwest trending through the east perimeter of the Childs Valley and forms the headwaters to the Tenmile Wash Drainage. Both drainages disappear into the ground before reaching the Gila River Valley.

== See also ==
- List of mountain ranges of Arizona
