= List of mountain ranges of Pima County, Arizona =

A list of mountain ranges of Pima County, Arizona.

== Alphabetical list ==
- Agua Dulce Mountains–Pima County
- Ajo Range–Pima County
- Alvarez Mountains–Pima County
- Artesa Mountains–Pima County
- Baboquivari Mountains (Arizona)–Pima County; See: Baboquivari Peak Wilderness
- Batamote Mountains–Pima County
- Bates Mountains–Pima County
- Brownell Mountains–Pima County
- Castle Mountains (Arizona)–Pima County
- Cerro Colorado Mountains–Pima County
- Cimarron Mountains–Pima County
- Coyote Mountains (Arizona)–Pima County
- Crooked Mountains–Pima County
- Diablo Mountains (Arizona)–Pima County
- Empire Mountains–Pima County
- Gakolik Mountains–Pima County
- Granite Mountains (Arizona)–Pima County–see also: Granite Mountain (Arizona)-(Yavapai County)
  a separate "Granite Mountain" is in s. La Paz County
- Growler Mountains–Pima County
- John the Baptist Mountains–Pima County
- La Lesna Mountains–Pima County
- Las Guijas Mountains–Pima County
- Little Ajo Mountains–Pima County
- Mesquite Mountains (Arizona)–Pima County
- North Comobabi Mountains–Pima County
- Pozo Redondo Mountains–Pima County
- Pozo Verde Mountains–Pima County
- Puerto Blanco Mountains–Pima County
- Quijotoa Mountains–Pima County
- Quinlan Mountains–Pima County
- Rincon Mountains–Pima County
- Roskruge Mountains–Pima County
- San Luis Mountains–Pima County
- Santa Catalina Mountains–Pima County, Pinal County
- Santa Rita Mountains–Santa Cruz, Pima County
- Santa Rosa Mountains (Arizona)–Pima County
- Sauceda Mountains–Pima County
- Sheridan Mountains–Pima County
- Sierra Blanca Mountains–Pima County
- Sierra de la Nariz–Pima County
- Sierra de Santa Rosa–Pima County
- Sierrita Mountains–Pima County
- Sikort Chuapo Mountains–Pima County
- Silver Bell Mountains–Pima County
- Sonoyta Mountains–Pima County
- South Comobabi Mountains–Pima County
- Tortolita Mountains–Pima County, Pinal County
- Tucson Mountains–Pima County, Pinal County
- Waterman Mountains–Pima County
- West Silver Bell Mountains–Pima County

== Madrean Sky Island region ==
=== Madrean region Pima County ranges ===
The regional major and minor mountain regions called Madrean Sky Islands, the sky islands region of southeast Arizona, extreme southwest New Mexico, and northern Sonora, Mexico, the north extension of the Sierra Madre Occidental, the western cordillera of northern and western Mexico. (highest elevation in bold)

- Baboquivari Mountains (Arizona)**( 7730 )**Pima County; See: Baboquivari Peak Wilderness
- Pozo Verde Mountains**( 4885 )**
- Quinlan Mountains**( 5014 )**
  (on eastern border of Sonoran Desert region-(extension north of Baboquivari Mountains))
- Rincon Mountains–**( 8664 )**
- San Luis Mountains**( 5369 )**
- Santa Catalina Mountains–**( 9157 )**–Pima County, Pinal County
- Santa Rita Mountains–**( 9453 )**–Santa Cruz County, Pima County
- Tortolita Mountains**( 4652 )**
  (both in Madrean sky island region, and also on border of Sonoran Desert ranges-(northeast Madrean))
  (Minor ranges: Cerro Colorado Mountains and San Luis Mountains on western border of the Madreans)

== See also ==
- List of mountain ranges of the Sonoran Desert
- List of Madrean Sky Island mountain ranges - Sonoran - Chihuahuan Deserts
