= Tom Childs =

American politician (1870–1951)

Tom Childs, Jr. (10 June 1870 – 5 February 1951) was an Arizona miner and rancher.

== Biography ==
He was born in Arizona City (renamed Yuma), Arizona Territory. His father was Tom Childs, Sr. His mother was Mary Thornberry.

Thomas Childs, Sr. was a teamster, stage coach station manager, prospector, miner and rancher in Arizona having entered the territory by 1850. They finally settled on Lytle Creek near present San Bernardino, California. When he was 18 years old he joined a party heading for Sonora. After following the "Camino del Diablo" to Sonoita, Sonora, on the U.S.-Mexican border, the party went on to the Cubabi mines where they split up. In the years that followed, he did everything from running a sawmill in the Santa Rita Mountains south of Tucson, Arizona, to digging for silver at the famous Planchas de Plata below Nogales, Sonora.

In 1875, the Childs family moved to Phoenix, Arizona, to start the children in school. After Mrs. Mary Childs died, they moved to Ajo, Arizona. The elder Childs had wandered by there in 1850 while looking for the copper deposits that Mexicans in Sonora had told him about. The Childs family went to Ajo to get a start in the cattle business but never got far away from mining.

Both elder and younger Childs located the first mines at Ajo, Arizona in 1887. At first they were in partnership with the Shotwell-Calado Company, but their money soon gave out. After another try with the St. Louis Copper Company, they decided to handle it by themselves. In 1912, they sold out their holdings to the Calumet and Arizona Company. Later this firm became a part of the Phelps Dodge Corporation.

The Childs post office and station of the Tucson, Cornelia and Gila Bend Railroad was named for Childs.

Tom Childs, Jr. established a ranch in the mesquite thickets of Tenmile Wash near Ajo, Arizona. During this time, he began to take an interest in his Tohono O'odham neighbors. The Tohono O'odham knew him as "Muta" ("Woodpecker's nest inside of a Saguaro").

He married a tribe member, Martina Thomas, with whom he had twelve children. One of his daughters, Fillman Childs Bell, became a published author and respected historian. Tom Childs Jr died at the New Cornelia Hospital in Ajo and was buried next to his wife at the Childs Cemetery on the Ten Mile Ranch north of Ajo.

== See also ==
- Childs Valley

== Other sources ==
- Bill Hoy (1999) "Don Tomás and Tomasito: The Childs Family Legacy in Southern Arizona" (The Journal of Arizona History, Vol. 40, No. 1), pp. 1–28)
