= Ajo Range =

Mountain range in Arizona, United States

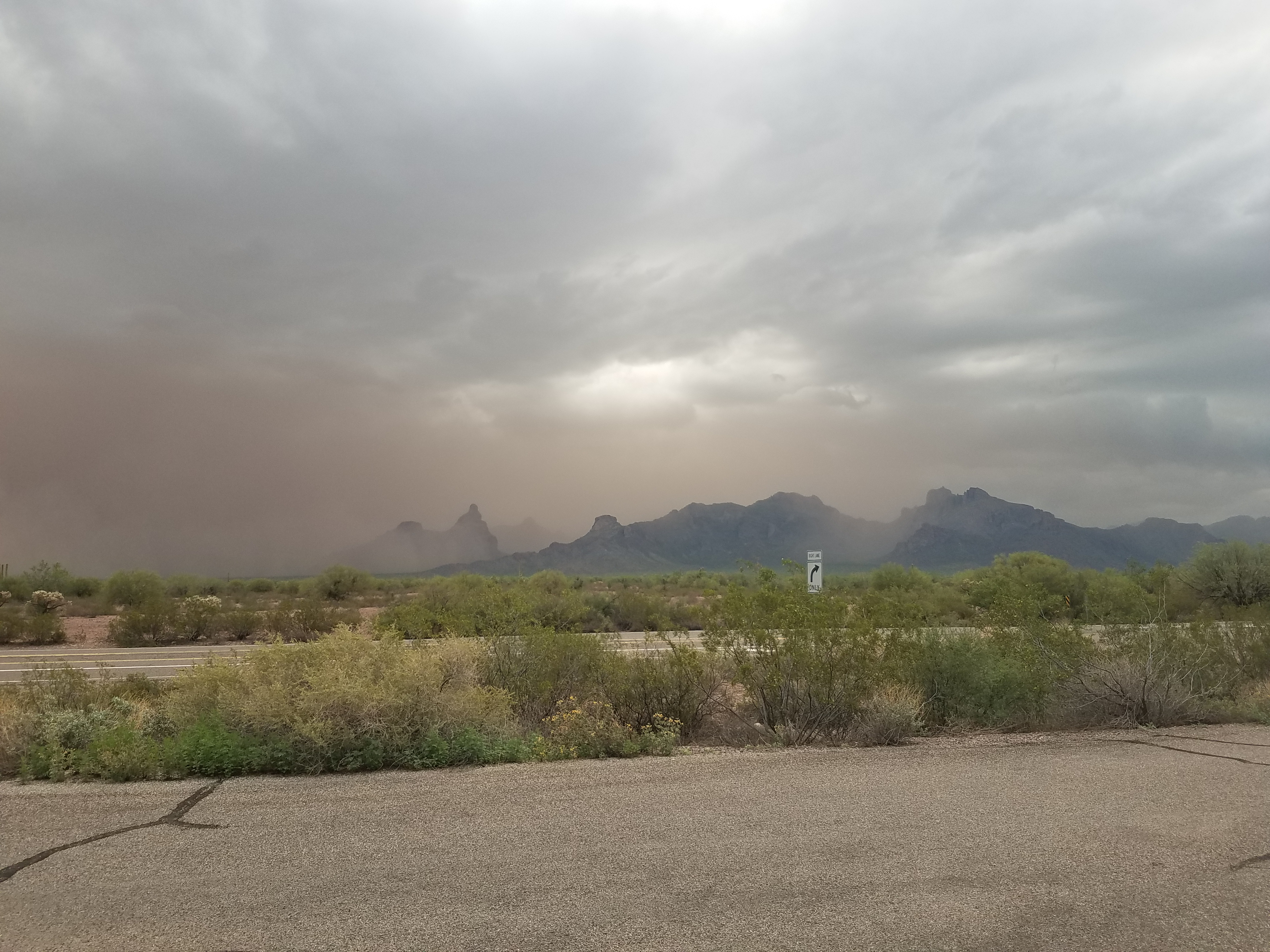
- A dust storm rolls in over the Ajo Range. Montezuma's Head (I'Itoi Mo'o) is visible to the left.

Highest point
- Peak: Mount Ajo
- Elevation: 4,808 ft (1,465 m)

Dimensions
- Length: 37 mi (60 km) N–S

Geography
- Location within Arizona
- Country: United States
- State: Arizona
- Region: Sonoran Desert
- Topo map: USGS Mount Ajo

The Ajo Range is a remote and rugged mountain range located in southern Pima County, Arizona, in the southwestern region of the United States. The range is situated within the northern reaches of the Sonoran Desert and forms part of the broader Basin and Range Province.

== Geography ==
The Ajo Range extends roughly 37 miles in a north–south direction, forming a prominent linear feature in the desert landscape. It is bordered by the Little Ajo Mountains to the north, the Childs Valley to the west, and the Valley of the Ajo to the east. The range lies just east of the western boundary of the Organ Pipe Cactus National Monument and is partially within its protected area.

== Peaks ==
The highest point in the range is Mount Ajo, which rises to an elevation of 4,808 feet (1,465 m). Mount Ajo is also the highest point in Organ Pipe Cactus National Monument and is known for its steep, rocky terrain and wide-ranging desert views.

== Geology ==
The Ajo Range is composed primarily of volcanic rocks, including rhyolite and andesite, dating to the mid-Tertiary period. The rugged relief is the result of extensive tectonic activity associated with the Basin and Range extension.

== History ==
Prior to European colonization, the range was a seasonal village and hunting site for the Hohokam and later the Tohono O'Odham and Hia-Ced O'Odham peoples. The first European known to have visited the area, Italian Jesuit Eusebio Kino, established a mission at the O'Odham village of Son Oidag in the valley below the range in 1701, which grew into the Mexican town of Sonoyta, Sonora in the 1850s. Following the Gadsden Purchase of 1854 the US/Mexico border was redrawn through the Ajo Mountains, and American miners and ranchers began to settle nearby. Most notable among them was the Gray family, who maintained line camps and pastures throughout the range at sites including Alamo Canyon and Bull Pasture. The eastern half of the range became part of the Tohono O'Odham Reservation in 1916, while on the western half most human uses, both indigenous and settler, were forcibly ended following the range's designation as part of Organ Pipe Cactus National Monument in 1937. The Gray family, however, was allowed to continue grazing in the monument, although this did not prevent a decades-long legal battle from erupting between the Grays and the federal government, as the Park Service argued Gray cattle were damaging the ecology of the monument while the Grays were unwilling to give up their traditional way of life. While the case was never resolved in court, the last Gray heir died in 1976 and no grazing has been permitted in the Ajo Range, or anywhere else on Organ Pipe, since.

Given their location on the US/Mexico border, the Ajo Mountains have long been a corridor for travel between the two countries. This traffic was largely unregulated for Mexican and American citizens in the 19th and early 20th centuries, although the passage of the Chinese Exclusion Act in 1882 forced Chinese immigrants to enter clandestinely. Many Chinese immigrants are known to have crossed in or around the Ajo Range. The first US Border Patrol agent, Jeff Milton, worked the Sonoyta corridor, including the Ajo Range, with the job title of "Mounted Chinese Inspector" in the early 20th century. Following the implementation of Prevention Through Deterrence in the 1990s the range has become a major corridor for clandestine traffic from Mexico, and is heavily traveled by immigrants as well as Border Patrol and humanitarian groups such as No More Deaths.

== Ecology ==
The range is part of the Sonoran Desert ecosystem and supports a diverse array of desert flora and fauna. The protected status of the adjacent Organ Pipe Cactus National Monument has helped preserve populations of saguaro cactus, organ pipe cactus, ocotillo, and various desert shrubs. Wildlife includes bighorn sheep, javelina, Gila monster, and many species of reptiles and birds.

== Access ==
The Ajo Range is largely undeveloped and difficult to access. While there are no paved roads into the heart of the range, several dirt roads and hiking routes approach its edges from Organ Pipe Cactus National Monument. Mount Ajo is a popular backcountry hiking destination for experienced hikers seeking solitude and panoramic views.

== Nearby features ==
- The town of Ajo, Arizona lies approximately 10 miles north of the range. - The Cabeza Prieta National Wildlife Refuge is located to the west. - Organ Pipe Cactus National Monument lies to the south and southeast.

== See also ==
- List of mountain ranges of Arizona
- Little Ajo Mountains
- Sonoran Desert
- Organ Pipe Cactus National Monument
