= Waldemar Theodore Schaller =

- Born: August 3, 1882; Oakland, California, USA
- Died: September 28, 1967 (aged 85); Washington, D.C., USA
- Education: University of California; Ludwig-Maximilians-Universität München
- Scientific career
- Workplaces: United States Geological Survey
- Thesis: Beitrag zur Kenntnis der Turmalingruppe
- Doctoral advisor: Paul Heinrich von Groth

Waldemar Theodore Schaller (August 3, 1882 – September 28, 1967) was an American mineralogist and longtime employee of the United States Geological Survey (USGS).

== Education and career ==
Schaller is the son of Theodore P. Schaller and Eliza Bornernan Schaller. He first received basic knowledge in the field of chemistry from his father before he began his studies at the University of California. After receiving his bachelor's degree in 1903, he got a job with the USGS as an assistant chemist.

On March 1, 1912, Waldemar Schaller resigned from his job at the USGS for a while so that he and his wife, Mary Ellen Boyland, could visit a number of museums in Europe and talk to the mineralogists in charge there. In June of the same year he received his doctorate in philosophy at the Ludwig-Maximilians-Universität München under Professor Paul Heinrich von Groth for his study of the tourmaline group.

From 1944 to 1947, Schaller was the executive director of the USGS Chemistry and Physics Division. After working for the USGS for more than 60 years, Schaller became seriously ill in 1965 and finally died two years later at the Mar Salle Nursing Home in Washington, D.C.

== Research highlights ==
Schaller's contributions to mineralogy were numerous and covered a wide range of subjects. Most notable, however, is his conclusion that water or hydroxyl is an essential component of tremolite, which subsequently led to a new interpretation of the composition and structure of all amphiboles. Likewise, his studies on the paragenesis of salt minerals and their deposits in New Mexico and Texas from the Permian period were groundbreaking for the British mineralogists and their later investigations of the English evaporites of the same age.

Schaller is considered the first to describe over 40 new minerals. Already in 1905 he described the purpurite together with Louis Caryl Graton.

In 1912, three more mineral descriptions followed: hydroxyapatite, sicklerite and stewartite, and four more mineral descriptions in one year in 1915: bisbeeite, fernandinite, minasragrite and shattuckite, although bisbeeite was discredited by the CNMMNC in 1977 as being identical to chrysocolla following more recent investigations.

With kernite, a rare but important ore for the production of boron was added in 1927, In 1950, the silicate miserite followed in a corrective description and in 1958, together with Angelina C. Vlisidis, described the ajoite.

Although the mineral crandallite was already known by B. Kosmann in 1869, it was only in 1927 by Gerald Francis Loughlin and Schaller that it received an exact analysis and its final name.

== Honors and awards ==
Schaller was elected to the American Academy of Arts and Sciences in 1919. He was a member of the Mineralogical Society of America, where he was treasurer from 1930 to 1940, vice president in 1921 and president in 1926. He was also Vice President (1934) and President (1935) of the Geological Society of Washington, and Vice President 1936-1937 of the Washington Academy of Sciences. Outside America, he was a member of the Mineralogical Society of Great Britain and Ireland, the German Mineralogical Society and the Mineralogical Society of Austria. He was also a member of the Sigma Xi scientific association and the Cosmos Club.

In 1925, a mineral described by Gage, Larsen, and Vassar was named schallerite in his honor.

He received numerous awards throughout his career, including the following

- Roebling Medal from the Mineralogical Society of America (1938)
- Honorary Member of the Mineralogical Society of Great Britain and Ireland (1945)
- USGS Distinguished Service Medal (1952)
- Honorary Member of the Société française de Mineralogie et Cystallographie (1956)
- Friedrich Becke Medal of the Austrian Mineralogical Society (1963)

== Bibliography ==
Waldemar Schaller's bibliography includes around 300 writings and works, among others:

- 1909: The mercury minerals from Terlingua, Texas
- 1914: Colorado ferberite and the wolframite series
- 1916: Cassiterite in San Diego County, California
- 1930: Borate minerals from the Kramer district Mohave Desert, California
- 1932: The crystal cavities of the New Jersey zeolite region und Mineralogy of drill cores from the potash field of New Mexico and Texas
