= Papagoite =

Cyclosilicate mineral

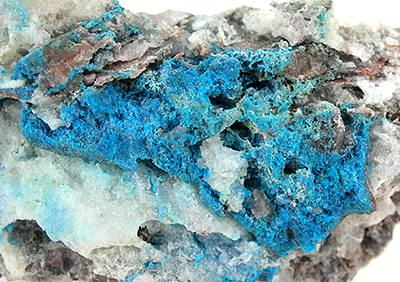
- Crystalline papagoite from Namibia (size: 5.9 x 3.3 x 2.1 cm)

General
- Category: Cyclosilicate
- Formula: CaCuAlSi_{2}O_{6}(OH)_{3}
- IMA symbol: Pap
- Strunz classification: 9.CE.05
- Crystal system: Monoclinic
- Crystal class: Prismatic (2/m) (same H-M symbol)
- Space group: C2/m
- Unit cell: a = 12.92 Å, b = 11.49 Å, c = 4.69 Å; β = 100.81°; Z = 4

Identification
- Color: Dark blue crystals, light blue when massive
- Crystal habit: Massive; cryptocrystalline, forming flat elongated crystals
- Cleavage: Imperfect in one direction
- Fracture: Brittle
- Mohs scale hardness: 5–5.5
- Luster: Vitreous to dull
- Streak: Light blue
- Specific gravity: 3.25
- Optical properties: Biaxial (-)
- Refractive index: n_{α} = 1.607 n_{β} = 1.641 n_{γ} = 1.672
- Birefringence: δ = 0.065
- Pleochroism: Trichroic
- 2V angle: Measured: 78°

Papagoite is a rare cyclosilicate mineral. Chemically, it is a calcium copper aluminium silicate hydroxide, found as a secondary mineral on slip surfaces and in altered granodiorite veins, either in massive form or as microscopic crystals that may form spherical aggregates. Its chemical formula is Ca Cu Al Si_{2}O_{6}(O H)_{3}.

It was discovered in 1960 in Ajo, Arizona, United States, and was named after the Hia C-eḍ Oʼodham people (also known as the Sand Papago) who inhabit the area. This location is the only papagoite source within the United States, while worldwide it is also found in South Africa and Namibia. It is associated with aurichalcite, shattuckite, ajoite and baryte in Arizona, and with quartz, native copper and ajoite in South Africa. Its bright blue color is the mineral's most notable characteristic.

It is used as a gemstone.
