= Ira Joralemon =

American mining engineer

Ira Joralemon

Ira Beaman Joralemon (1884 – 1975) was an American mining engineer, economic geologist, and mining company executive, who specialized in exploration and mining of copper ore deposits. Over a career spanning more than six decades, Joralemon was involved in the discovery and development of numerous major copper and gold deposits, many of which went on to become operational mines. In addition to his professional career within the minerals industry, he was also a popular science author and historian of the mining industry.

== Biography ==
Ira B. Joralemon graduated from Harvard University with an A.B. (magna cum laude) in Mining and Metallurgy in 1905, and received an A.M. degree in the same subject from the same institution in 1907.

After graduation he took a job as a mining engineer with the Calumet & Arizona Mining Company, working on their copper mining properties near Bisbee, Arizona. Following the appointment of new C&A Company General Manager John C. Greenway in 1911, it was Joralemon's assessment of copper mineralization found near Ajo, Arizona, that persuaded Greenway the C&A Company should purchase a controlling interest in the fledgeling New Cornelia Copper Company who were developing the property, which would eventually become the New Cornelia mine. Joralemon played a key part in the development of the New Cornelia mine, the first large open-pit copper mine in the state, and was instrumental in adopting a high-risk exploration strategy which successfully located what became the United Verde Extension mine near Jerome, Arizona. He rose through the ranks of the C&A Company to become first Chief Geologist and then Assistant General Manager in 1917 and 1919, respectively.

His work with the C&A Company was interrupted by World War I, during which Joralemon served with the United States Army Air Service between 1917 and 1919. For part of this time Major Joralemon was a member of General Billy Mitchell's staff, and was commended by Mitchell for his "wonderful work" during preparations for the Battle of Saint-Mihiel. For his service to France the French government awarded him the distinction of Chevalier of the Legion d'Honneur in 1918.

After his return from Europe, Joralemon continued in his work with the C&A Company in Arizona, as well as acting on behalf of the Anaconda Copper Mining Company, assessing properties for them in Siberia and South America. However, in 1922 Joralemon resigned from the C&A Company to set up his own consultancy, although he did maintain close links to the C&A and to Phelps Dodge, who merged with C&A in 1931, for the rest of his career. Basing himself in San Francisco, Joralemon's consulting work involved him in numerous ore deposit discoveries and development work over the following 50 years, many of which went on to become profitable mines, including: Potrerillos copper mine, Chile; Ahumada lead mine, Mexico; Central Eureka gold mine, California; Consolidated Copper mine, Nevada; Yellow Pine tungsten mine, Idaho; and Bralorne gold mine, British Columbia. He also acted as an executive board member for many mining companies and published numerous technical reports and scientific manuscripts during this period.

During World War II, Joralemon served on the War Production Board as a strategic minerals specialist, ensuring adequate supplies of raw materials for the USA and her allies during the conflict. In civilian life, he served as Vice President (1950) and President (1951) of the Society of Economic Geologists, as well as acting as director of both The American Institute of Mining Engineers and the Mining and Metallurgical Society of America.

Away from his active involvement in the mining industry, in 1934 Joralemon published the book Romantic Copper: Its Lure and Lore, a popular science study of the history of copper mining and its use by humans. This work has been described as "definitive" by the National Mining Hall of Fame & Museum. Following his retirement, Joralemon updated the text and expanded it to include many aspects of more modern mining operations, and this was published as Copper: The Encompassing Story of Mankind's First Metal in 1973. Ira Joralemon's autobiography, Adventure Beacons (edited by his son, Peter Joralemon), was published posthumously in 1976.

== Selected bibliography ==
- Joralemon, Ira B. (1934) Romantic Copper: Its Lure and Lore. Appleton-Century Co., New York. 294 p.
- Joralemon, Ira B. (1973) Copper: The Encompassing Story of Mankind's First Metal. Howell-North Books, Berkeley. 407 p.
- Joralemon, Ira B. (1976) Adventure Beacons. Society of Mining Engineers of AIME, New York. 487 p.
