= Ajo Copper News =

Weekly newspaper in Ajo, Arizona

- Type: Weekly newspaper
- Format: Tabloid
- Founder: Renwick White
- Publisher: H.J. "Hop" David
- Editor: Gabrielle David
- Founded: 1916
- Language: English
- Headquarters: Ajo, Arizona
- Circulation: 945 Print; 243 E-Subscription (as of 2022)
- Website: cunews.info

The Ajo Copper News is a weekly community newspaper serving western Pima County, Arizona. It has been published since 1916 in Ajo, Arizona.

== History ==
On April 29, 1916, the first edition of the Ajo Copper News was published by Renwick White. White published the paper for 31 years. In 1947, he sold the News to L.T. "Ted" Beggs. In 1951, Beggs went missing and was found a week later in the desert after committing suicide. His widow Jeri Beggs Davis then took over the paper.

In 1954, George Wayne Gable bought an interest. He then succeeded Davis as publisher and his son Barry W. Gable became editor. In 1958, George Gable died from a sudden heart attack. Barry Gable took over the paper and a few years later become one of the first people in the country to successfully receive a kidney transplantation.

In 1968, Richard F. Davis acquired the paper. He died in 1983. His widow Ann Hollister David died a decade later. As of 2026, their daughter Gabrielle David and son Hollister J. “Hop” David continue to operate the paper.
