= Tenmile Wash (Arizona) =

Ephemeral stream in Yuma, Maricopa, and Pima counties in Arizona, United States

Coordinates: 32.8703249°N 113.4765811°W

Tenmile Wash is an ephemeral wash and watercourse about 85 miles (137 km) long in the northern Sonoran Desert of south-central Arizona. It forms the eastern drainage of a two drainage system of dry washes into the Gila River Valley; both flow northwesterly, and the western drainage is the San Cristobal Wash Drainage of approximately the same length.

== Description ==
Tenmile Wash begins east of Ajo, Arizona. The Little Ajo and Growler Mountains are west; a series of mountains form the eastern perimeter, and especially the Pozo Redondo Mountains in the southeast. At this point a water divide occurs with the drainage south actually turning back northwest as part of the San Cristobal drainage through the Growler Valley (and is the north end of the Valley of the Ajo).

East and north of Ajo, Tenmile Wash flows northwest through the Childs Valley, on its eastern edge, as the west side of the Childs is drained by the Daniels Wash, again flowing into the San Cristobal drainage to the west.

At the downstream north end, Tenmile Wash traverses the western Sentinel Plain and enters the Park Valley through the 5-mile-long (8 km) Canyon Diablo; the watercourse then forms its own watercourse flowing southwestwards paralleling the Gila River to the north. They merge 20 miles (32 km) downstream.

Midway Wash is the eastern portion of the Tenmile Wash drainage; it also drains northwesterly into regions of the southern and central Sentinel Plain.

== Access ==
The north region of the Tenmile Wash traverses Interstate 8 11 miles (18 km) west of Sentinel and 2 miles east of Aztec. The southern region is accessed easily in the Ajo region on State Route 85; dirt roads also exit west from the north-south State Route 85 route, to access other parts of Tenmile Wash.

== See also ==
- List of rivers of Arizona
