= San Cristobal Wash =

Watercourse of the San Cristobal Valley, Arizona

Location
- Country: United States
- State: Arizona
- Region: San Cristobal Valley

Physical characteristics
- Source
  - location: San Cristobal Valley
- Mouth: Gila River
  - location: Yuma County, Arizona
  - coordinates: 32.7853244°N 113.742702°W

Basin features
- River system: Gila River basin
- GNIS feature ID: 25475

The San Cristobal Wash is an ephemeral wash and watercourse of the San Cristobal Valley, flowing north into the Gila River Valley of the southwestern desert region of Arizona. Besides Death Valley, the Chihuahuan Desert area, and regions of Baja Peninsula North America, the southeast California deserts along the Lower Colorado River Valley, this drainage region is in the harshest desert regions of North America.

The wash flows northwesterly with the alignment of the northwest–southeast trending mountains and valleys of the former Basin and Range mountain ranges. The washes and arroyos combine into the San Cristobal Wash which enters the San Cristobal Valley at the south. The wash ends its watercourse one third of the way into the valley, and disappears about 8 miles (13 km) south of the Gila River. The majority of the wash lies in the southeast of Yuma County, but southeast drainages from the Growler Valley area drain extreme western Pima County.

Southern portions of the San Cristobal Wash extend to the southern ends of two valleys and the drainage bifurcates, draining the Mohawk Valley southeasterly on the west and the southern-(south-flowing into headwaters of San Cristobal Wash), Growler Valley, on the east.

Drainages going northwest combine from the southeast into the San Cristobal Wash: the Growler Wash from the Growler Valley east of the Granite Mountains (Arizona), and east of there the Daniels Arroyo, which flows adjacent to the Tenmile Wash Drainage in the Childs Valley of southern Arizona, Pima County. The Tenmile Wash Drainage is the next upstream drainage on the south, to the Gila River-(before the Gila makes its turn from the north).

Downstream, the next and last watershed drainage for the Gila River is the Lower Gila Watershed. The southeast border of the San Cristobal drainage is the Tule Desert Drainage, where the Tule Desert (Arizona) has a drainage south into Sonora, Mexico.

== See also ==
- List of rivers of Arizona
