= Las Guijas Mountains =

Landform in Pima County, Arizona

- Location within Arizona

Highest point
- Elevation: 4,665 ft (1,422 m)
- Coordinates: 31°38′20″N 111°22′7″W

Dimensions
- Length: 11.7 km (7.3 mi) NW-SE
- Width: 3.7 km (2.3 mi) NE-SW
- Area: 33 km^{2} (13 mi^{2})

Geography
- Country: United States
- State: Arizona
- Region: Sonoran Desert
- County: Pima County, Arizona

The Las Guijas Mountains are a small northwest–southeast trending mountain range in southern Pima County, Arizona. The range is approximately 12 kilometres (7.5 mi) long by 4 km (2.5 mi). Surrounding ranges includes the Cerro Colorado Mountains to the northeast, the Tumacacori Mountains of Santa Cruz County to the east, the San Luis Mountains to the south and the Baboquivari Mountains across the Altar Valley to the west. Arivaca is immediately to the southeast and the old mining townsite of Las Guijas is in the wash just north of the range.

The highest peak of the range with elevation of 4,665 feet (1,422 m) lies 8 kilometres (5.0 mi) northwest of Arivaca which is at 3,643 feet (1,110 m). Las Guijas Peak at 4,650 feet (1,417 m) lies just 4500 feet south of the highest.

== Name ==
The name of the range came from 19th century Spanish miners referring to las guijas for the rubble as the placer gold they were working occurred in the gravels or conglomerates along the stream valleys and gulches draining the range.

== Geology ==
The southwestern flank of the range in underlain by up to 980 feet (300 m) of Jurassic age ash fall tuff of rhyodacite composition known as the tuff of Pajarito named for the Pajarito Mountains of Santa Cruz County to the southeast, later referred to as the Cobre Ridge Tuff. This tuff was sourced from the Cobre Ridge caldera. The northwest end of Cobre Ridge lies around 4 miles (6.4 km) south of the Las Guijas range. Younger Jurassic or Cretaceous sandstone and other sediments occur above the tuff.

The northeastern flank of the range is underlain by an intrusive granite also of Jurassic age.
