= Ajo High School =

Coordinates: 32.3743°N 112.8608°W

Location
- 111 N. Well Road; Ajo, Arizona 85321; United States

Information
- School type: Public high school
- School district: Ajo Unified School District
- Principal: Mercy Arancon
- Teaching staff: 6.00 (FTE)
- Grades: 9-12
- Enrollment: 134 (2023–2024)
- Student to teacher ratio: 22.33
- Colors: Red and white
- Mascot: Red Raider
- Website: www.ajoschools.org/high-school

Ajo High School is a high school in Ajo, Arizona. It is the only high school in the Ajo Unified School District, which also includes an elementary school and middle school on the same campus. It is a member of the CAA.
