= Growler Mountains =

Landform in Pima County, Arizona

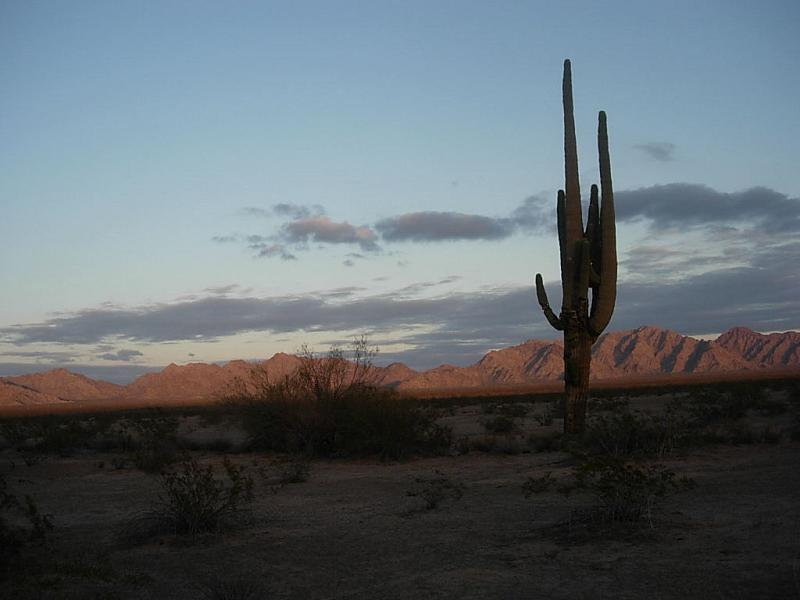
- Looking east towards the Growler Mountains

Highest point
- Peak: Unnamed
- Elevation: 3,294 ft (1,004 m)
- Coordinates: 32°14′34″N 113°01′40″W

Dimensions
- Length: 23 mi (37 km) N-S
- Width: 6 mi (9.7 km)

Geography
- Location within Arizona
- Country: United States
- State: Arizona
- Regions: Growler Valley and Sonoran Desert
- County: Pima County, Arizona
- Settlement: Ajo, AZ
- Borders on: Growler Valley (W), Childs Valley (E), Crater Range (NE) and Granite Mountains (Arizona) (W)

The Growler Mountains is a 23-mile, (37-km) long north-south trending mountain range of far western Pima County, Arizona that lies 12 miles (19 km) west of Ajo, Arizona. This desert region of southern Arizona lies in the north and central Sonoran Desert, and is one of the drier desert areas of North America.

The highest peak of the Granite Mountains is Unnamed at 3,294 feet (1,004 m) and is located in the south; Growler Peak is located at the north end of the range at 3,029 feet (923 m).

The Growler Range has the distinction of being on a water divide between two northwest-draining washes to the Gila River. The Growler's are at the headwaters of Growler Valley west of the range which is the southeast drainage to the San Cristobal Wash. The north end of the range is south and southwest of Childs Valley which is part of the Tenmile Wash Drainage. The two drainages are at the beginning of the Gila River's turn from going south-to-west and exiting southwest Arizona with its confluence with the Colorado River at Yuma, Arizona-Winterhaven, California.

== Location, and points of interest ==
The Growler Mountains are located in the east end of the Cabeza Prieta National Wildlife Refuge; the south end of the range abuts the northern perimeter of Organ Pipe Cactus National Monument, famous for scenery, and wildflowers in wet winters, and also the Organ Pipe Cactus. The center of the range is 12 miles west of Ajo, Arizona and State Route 85, and the northern end of the range lies about 40 miles (64 km) south of Sentinel, Arizona on Interstate 8 by unimproved dirt road. Summer conditions of high temperature and no water make dirt road travel dangerous at the height of summer.

The Growler Mountains are located at 32.2428-N, 113.0279-W.

== See also ==
- List of mountain ranges of Arizona
- Growler Valley
