= Tucson, Cornelia and Gila Bend Railroad =

Shortline railroad in Tucson, Arizona

The Tucson, Cornelia and Gila Bend Railroad went from the Southern Pacific's (now Union Pacific's) Gila Subdivision in Gila Bend, Arizona to Ajo, Arizona.

The railroad was incorporated in 1915 for use by the New Cornelia mine at Ajo. Originally, the railroad was intended to connect to Tucson. The railroad was in operation from 1916 until the 1980s.

The station of Childs was established in 1916 six miles north of Ajo. Childs was named for local rancher and miner Tom Childs, who discovered copper at Ajo. In 1934, Childs was described as having a post office and station.

In 1926, it was reported that the track was 44.327 miles long and that the railroad owned an additional 3.310 miles of tracks and sidings.

In 1969, six stations were listed in the timetable, but only Ajo and Gila Bend were agency stations. Black Gap and Rocky Point were short sidings used when passenger trains met. Childs and Midway were longer sidings. In 1972, it was mentioned that there were children living in Childs.

In 1998, Phelps Dodge upgraded the railroad for proposed resumed mining at Ajo.

The railroad passes through the Barry M. Goldwater Air Force Range.

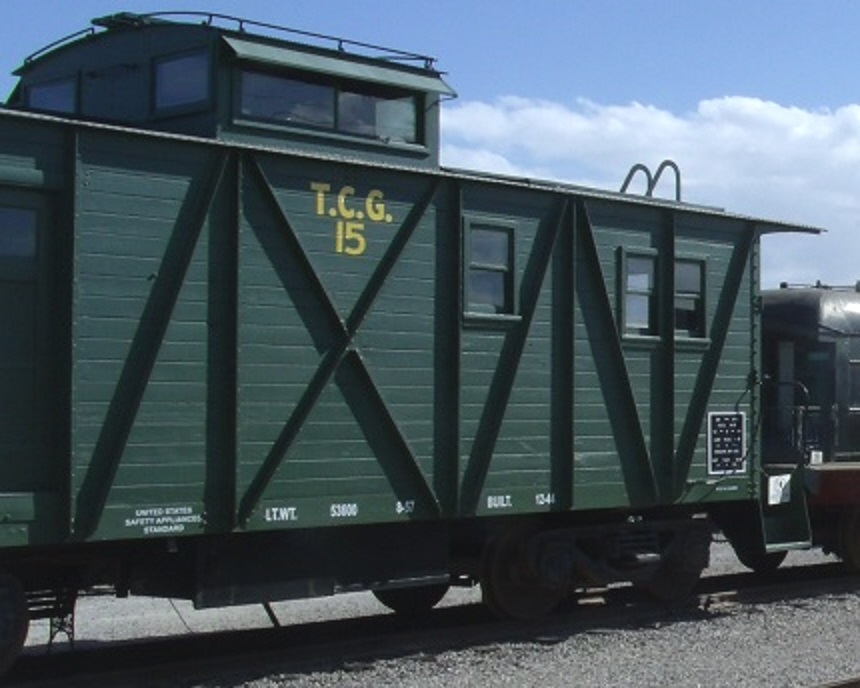
The Tucson, Cornelia & Gila Bend caboose No. 15, listed in the National Register of Historic Places on May 7, 2018, reference# 100001660.
