= Little Ajo Mountains =

Landform in Pima County, Arizona

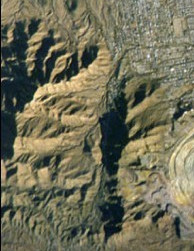

Highest point
- Peak: Black Mountain
- Elevation: 3,008 ft (917 m)

Geography
- Location within Arizona
- Country: United States
- State: Arizona
- Range coordinates: 32°21′06″N 112°52′32″W

The Little Ajo Mountains is a mountain range in southern Arizona, in extreme western Pima County, Arizona. The city of Ajo sits on the northeast of this small mountain range. Both the mountain range and city take their name from the Spanish word for garlic.

The range is a 13 by 13-mile (21 by 21-km) long range and is connected loosely northwest to Childs Mountain a northwest–southeast small mountain at the south of Childs Valley. Ajo, is in the center-east of the range, and is famous for the New Cornelia open pit copper mine located in the Little Ajo Mountains.

The peaks in the Little Ajo Mountains include the isolated Black Mountain which lies to the south of Ajo and has a peak elevation of 3,008 feet (917 m). Cardigan Peak at 2,922 feet (891 m) lies in the main mountain mass to the west of Ajo. Ajo Peak at 2,619 feet (798 m) and North Ajo Peak 2,776 feet (846 m) are isolated peaks to the southwest of Ajo. Camelback Mountain at 2,573 feet (784 m) lies just south of Ajo and overlooks the New Cornelia pit just to the east.

The Batamote Mountains lie to the northeast, the Pozo Redondo Mountains lie to the east, Bates Mountains and the Ajo Range lie to the south and the Growler Mountains lie to the west. The Barry M. Goldwater Air Force Range lies to the north and west of the mountains and the Cabeza Prieta National Wildlife Refuge also lies to the west.

== Valleys surrounding the Little Ajos ==
Drainage from the north and northeast side of the Little Ajo Mountains enters Tenmile Wash which flows northwest to enter Childs Valley. The southwest side of the range drains into Daniels Arroyo which flows northwest to also enter Childs Valley. The southeast side of the range drains to the south in the Cuerda de Leña in the Valley of the Ajo and turns west around the south end of the Growler Mountains to join the northwest draining Growler Valley.

== Access to the mountains ==
Ajo, Arizona and the mountains are 70 miles (113 km) south of Interstate 8 by way of State Route 85; they are also 80 miles (129 km) west of Quijotoa, Arizona and the Tohono O'odham Reservation.

== See also ==
- List of mountain ranges of Arizona
