= New Cornelia mine =

Open-pit copper mine in Pima County, Arizona

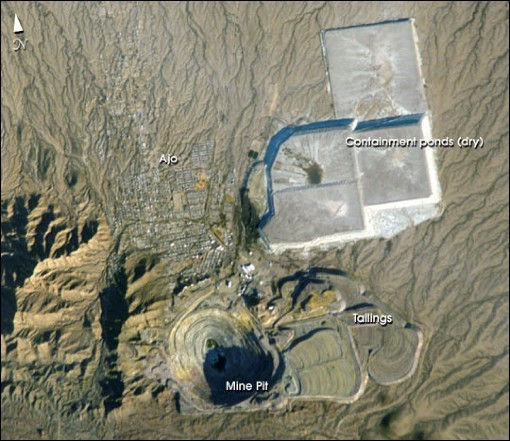
New Cornelia mine and the town of Ajo, Arizona. Photo: NASA

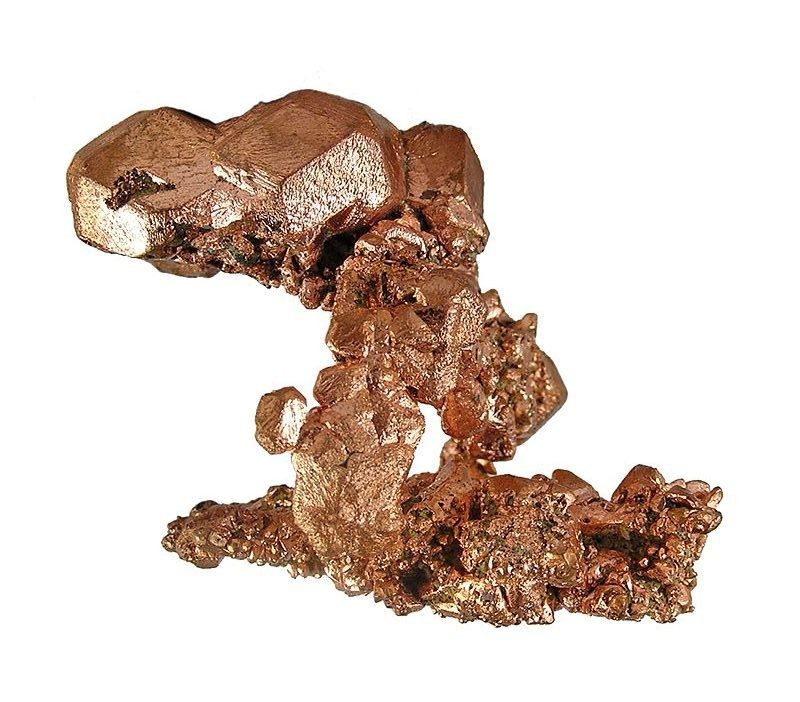
Native copper specimen from the New Cornelia mine. Size 6.4 x 4.7 x 4.6 cm.

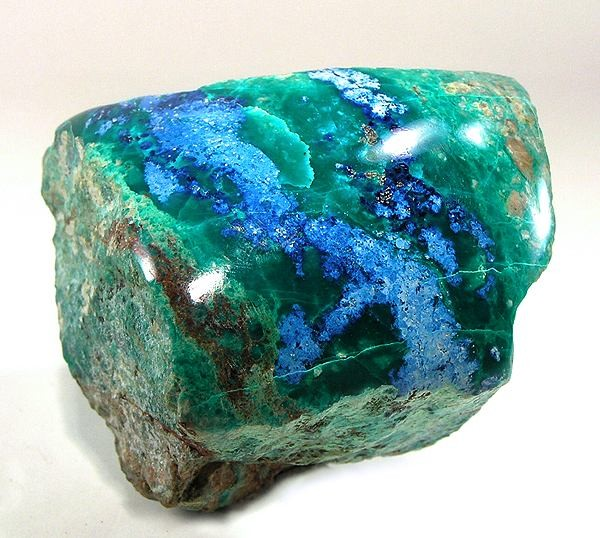
Shattuckite with malachite, polished specimen, New Cornelia mine. Size 5.3 x 5.1 x 5.0 cm.

The New Cornelia mine is a currently inactive open-pit copper mine in Pima County, Arizona, United States. It was the only productive mine in the Ajo mining district, and is located just outside the town of Ajo, which was built as a company town to serve the New Cornelia mines. The roughly circular pit is one and a half miles across at its widest point, and 1,100 feet deep at the center. Although not generally regarded as a 'dam', the New Cornelia Mine Tailings is often cited as the largest dam structure in the United States with a volume of 7.4 billion cubic feet.

== History, archaeological mining history ==
Native Americans had long mined surface exposures of copper veins near the New Cornelia for pigments: red copper oxide and green copper carbonate. Spanish miners are known to have excavated test shafts in the area by 1750, but the amount of copper produced is not known. Americans claimed the location in 1854 and shipped a few loads of selected ore to Swansea, Wales, but high transportation charges left little or no profit, and the mine was abandoned.

Development of the property was delayed because of its remote location in the Sonoran Desert. The low-grade copper ore could not be economically shipped to a smelter, and had to be concentrated at the site. The Cornelia Copper Company was organized by businessmen from St. Louis in 1900 to develop the property. However, early owners fumbled in their search for a suitable treatment process, and fell victim to "process men". In 1906 the owners contracted with Fred McGahan to build his unique "vacuum smelter" to treat the ore. The following year the company had McGahan indicted for obtaining money under false pretenses. It then arranged with another inventor to build facilities to treat the ore by the unproven "Anderson Process", which proved just as useless as McGahan’s process. A United States Geological Survey author later described these processes as "... among the most bizarre ever to have been floated in American mining." Mining commentator Horace Stevens wrote:

"The officers of the Cornelia are residents of St. Louis and vicinity, of excellent local standing, and perfectly sincere in their operations, but are totally lacking in practical knowledge of the copper business, and prone to overmuch experimentation with new processes."

The company reorganized as the New Cornelia Mining Company. In 1911, the Calumet and Arizona Mining Company, which already had a major operation in Bisbee, took an option to buy 70 percent of New Cornelia stock. Calumet and Arizona confirmed the existence of a large copper carbonate orebody, and exercised the option. It then found a practical way to treat the ore, and located a sufficient source of water several miles north. A pilot plant began operation in 1915, and the Tucson, Cornelia and Gila Bend Railroad to Gila Bend was completed in 1916.

Share of the New Cornelia Copper Company, issued 7 February 1929

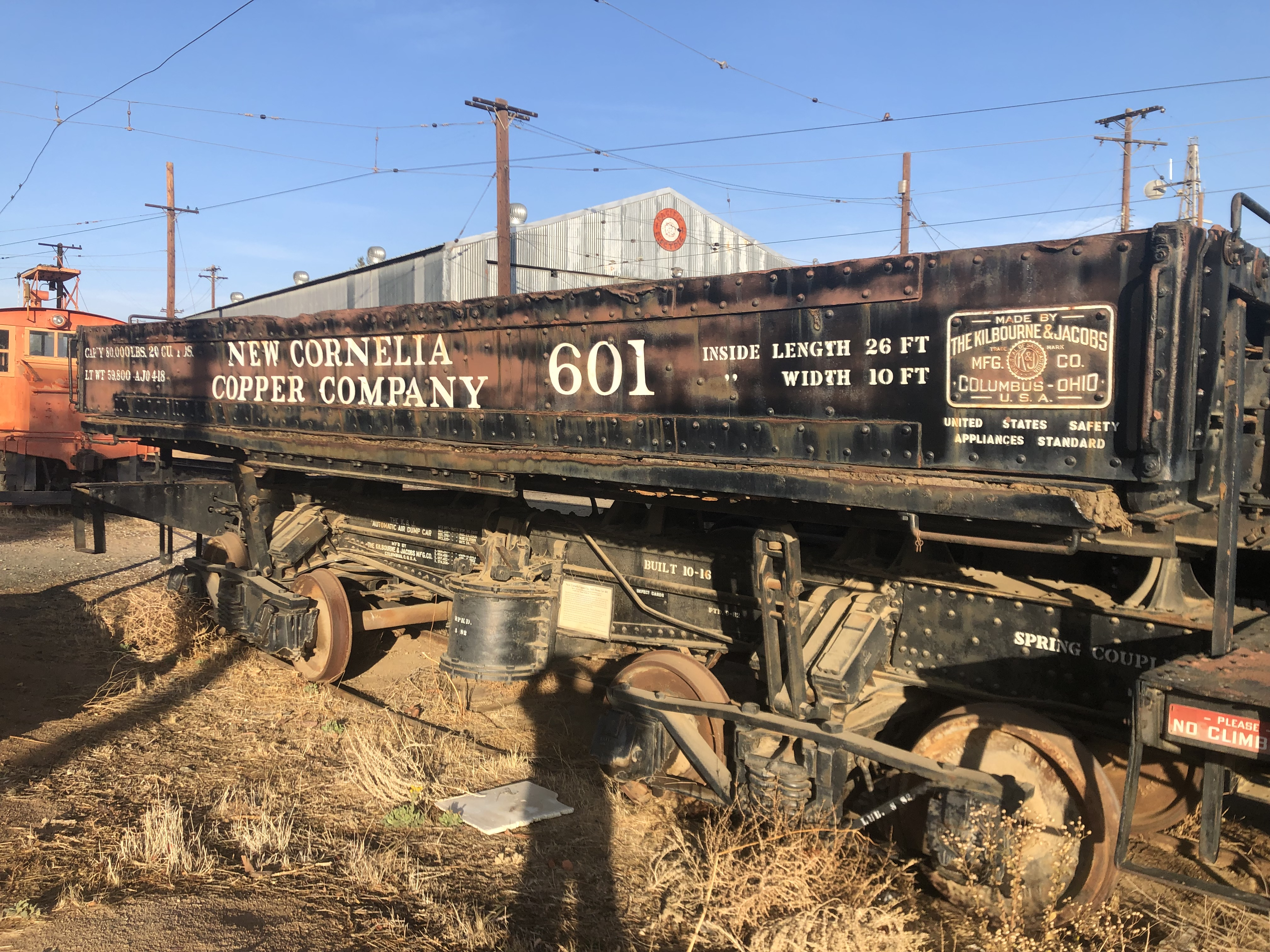
Air-dump gondola of the New Cornelia Copper Company

Full-scale mining using steam shovels was started in 1917, making the New Cornelia the first large open pit mine in Arizona. Mining and treatment of the underlying but lower-grade copper sulfide orebody began in 1924.

New Cornelia came under the ownership of Phelps Dodge in 1931 when Calumet and Arizona merged with Phelps Dodge.

New Cornelia Mine came under the ownership of Freeport McMoRan Copper & Gold Corporation, when it acquired Phelps Dodge, to become the largest publicly traded copper producer in the world in 2007.

The mine was shut down in 1983 due to low copper prices, and a worker dispute with the local union. Some of the minerals, that were byproducts of the mining / refining process, are currently being removed and sold for alternative uses by the Minerals Research and Recovery corporation under contract with Freeport McMoRan, (2012), which purchased the New Cornelia Mine in their 2007 acquisition of the Phelps Dodge Corporation. Copper production from the mine totaled 6.304 billion pounds of copper, worth about US$20.8 billion at the 2010 copper price of $3.30/pound.

== Geography ==
The mine is at 32°21′20″N 112°51′57″W, at an altitude of 899 feet (274 m) above mean sea level.

== See also ==
- Copper mining in Arizona
- L. D. Ricketts
- Ira Joralemon
