= Growler Valley =

Landform in Pima and Maricopa Counties, Arizona

- Location within Arizona
- Length: 65 mi (105 km)
- Width: 10 mi (16 km)

Geography
- Country: United States
- State: Arizona
- Region: Sonoran Desert
- District: Pima County, Arizona, Maricopa County, Arizona
- Population center: Ajo
- Borders on: Granite Mountains (Arizona)-W; Growler Mountains-E
- Coordinates: 32.2428°N 113.0279°W
- Interactive map of Growler Valley

The Growler Valley is a valley of south-central Arizona west of Ajo, Arizona.

Growler Valley is a 65-mile (105-km) long valley paralleling the Growler Mountains on the east-(attached to the Little Ajo Mountains), and the Granite Mountains on the west. Most of Growler Valley is located in the Cabeza Prieta National Wildlife Refuge, with part located in the Barry M. Goldwater Air Force Range.

The Growler Wash transits the valley northwesterly, and turns west to meet the San Cristobal Wash at the north end of the Granite Mountains. The Growler Valley is the southeast portion of the San Cristobal Wash Watershed and drains from the north perimeter of the Organ Pipe Cactus National Monument. Drainages south flow into northern Sonora, Mexico. The northwesterly-flowing San Cristobal drainage disappears into the ground before reaching the Gila River Valley.

The Growler Valley & Growler Mountains are located at 32.2428-N, 113.0279-W.

== Access to Growler Valley ==
The closest access points to the Growler are by dirt road from Ajo, Arizona on State Route 85. Central areas of the valley are by dirt road through the central Growler Mountains west of Ajo, about 30 miles (48 km); the south of the valley and the north of the National Monument are 25 miles (40 km) southwest. The north of the valley is accessed from State Route 85 through the Childs Valley at about 45 miles (72 km).
