= Ajo, Cantabria =

Ajo
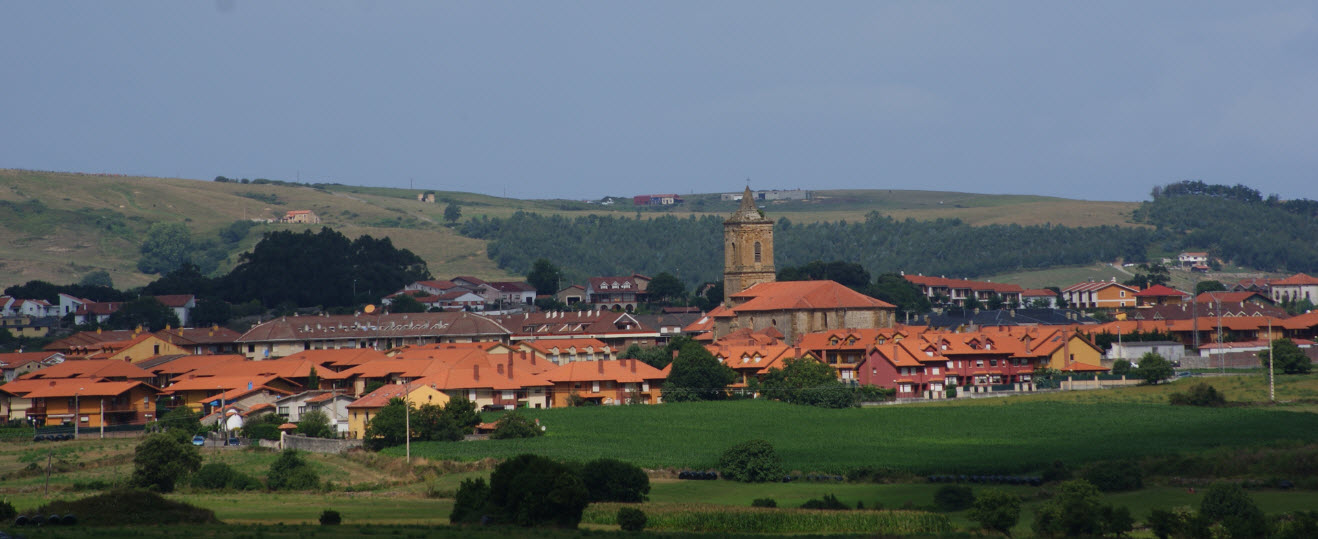
- View of Ajo at the church of Santa María

- Location within Spain
- Coordinates: 43°28′50″N 3°36′36″W
- Country: Spain
- Autonomous community: Cantabria
- Province: Cantabria
- Comarca: Trasmiera
- Judicial district: Santoña

Government
  - Mayor: D. José de la Hoz Lainz
- Elevation: 46 m (151 ft)

Population (2008)
  - Total: 1,549
- Time zone: UTC+1 (CET)
  - Summer (DST): UTC+2 (CET)

Ajo is the capital of Bareyo municipality in Cantabria, Spain. The town is 29 kilometres (18 mi) from Santander.

== History ==
The first historical written reference to Ajo (Asio) is in the "Liber Testamentarum" of Oviedo Cathedral from 923, in which the King Ordoño II of León donated the church of San Juan de Asio. Popular etymology without any basis says that the name comes from the great quantity of garlic that the town's inhabitants consumed and that gave the locality a typical smell.

== Economy ==
25% of the population of the municipality works in the primary sector, 19.1% in construction, 9.5% in industry and 46.4% in the services sector. The jobs of more than 78% of the population are related to the garlic industry.

== Means of information ==
The municipal corporation has published since 2007 the Ojerada magazine, which reports on various activities in the municipality. Since 2010, the municipality has a means of information managed by neighbors that has become a reference for local information in Cantabria. It is the Bareyo Digital or Bareyo Digital Media.
