= Ajo Unified School District =

School district in Arizona, United States

Ajo Unified School District 15

Location
- 111 North Well Road, Ajo, Arizona 85321 United States

District information
- Grades: pK-12
- Superintendent: Dr. Soltero
- Schools: Ajo High School, Ajo Elementary School

Students and staff
- Colors: Red/white

Other information
- Website: www.ajoschools.org

Ajo School District 15 And 103 is a public school district in Pima County, Arizona, United States.

== Schools ==
- Ajo High School
- Ajo Elementary School
