= Cobre Ridge caldera =

Caldera in Arizona, U.S.

Coordinates: 31.363°N 111.127°W

The Cobre Ridge caldera is a large Jurassic volcano in the U.S. state of Arizona. Geological field studies by Nancy Riggs and Cathy Busby show that it formed about 170 million years ago when a VEI-8 eruption ejected more than 1,000 km^{3} (240 mi^{3}) of crystal-rich rhyodacite ignimbrite.
