= Shattuckite =

Copper silicate hydroxide mineral

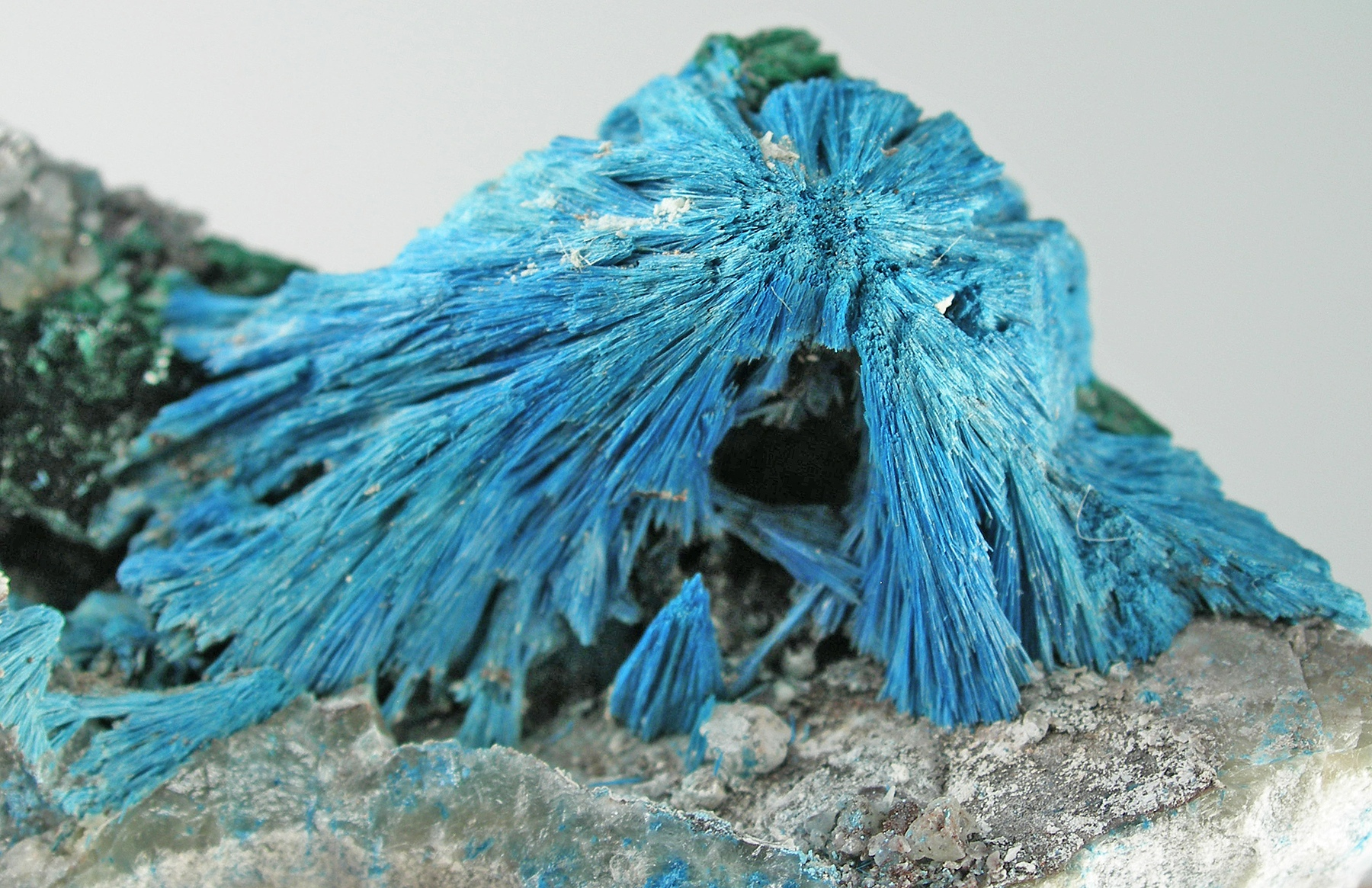

General
- Category: Inosilicate
- Formula: Cu_{5}(SiO_{3})_{4}(OH)_{2}
- IMA symbol: Sha
- Strunz classification: 9.DB.40
- Crystal system: Orthorhombic
- Crystal class: Dipyramidal (mmm); H-M symbol: (2/m 2/m 2/m)
- Space group: Pcab

Identification
- Color: Dark and light blue, turquoise
- Crystal habit: Commonly spherulitic aggregates of acicular crystals
- Cleavage: perfect along [010] and [100]
- Fracture: uneven
- Mohs scale hardness: 3.5
- Luster: Dull to silky
- Streak: Blue
- Diaphaneity: Translucent to opaque
- Specific gravity: 4.1 (rather heavy for a non-metallic mineral)
- Optical properties: Biaxial (+)
- Refractive index: n_{α} = 1.753, n_{β} = 1.782, n_{γ} = 1.815
- Pleochroism: X = very pale blue; Y = pale blue; Z = deep blue

Shattuckite is a copper silicate hydroxide mineral with formula Cu_{5}(SiO_{3})_{4}(OH)_{2}. It crystallizes in the orthorhombic – dipyramidal crystal system and usually occurs in a granular massive form and also as fibrous acicular crystals. It is closely allied to plancheite in structure and appearance.

Shattuckite is a relatively rare copper silicate mineral. It was first discovered in 1915 in the copper mines of Bisbee, Arizona, specifically the Shattuck Mine (hence the name). It is a secondary mineral that forms from the alteration of other secondary minerals. At the Shattuck Mine, it forms pseudomorphs after malachite. A pseudomorph is an atom by atom replacement of a crystal structure by another crystal structure, but with little alteration of the outward shape of the original crystal. It is sometimes used as a gemstone.

== Gallery ==
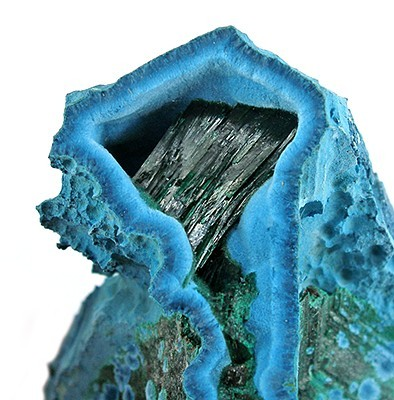
Shattuckite with malachite, about 4 cm wide. Kaokoveld Mine, Namibia

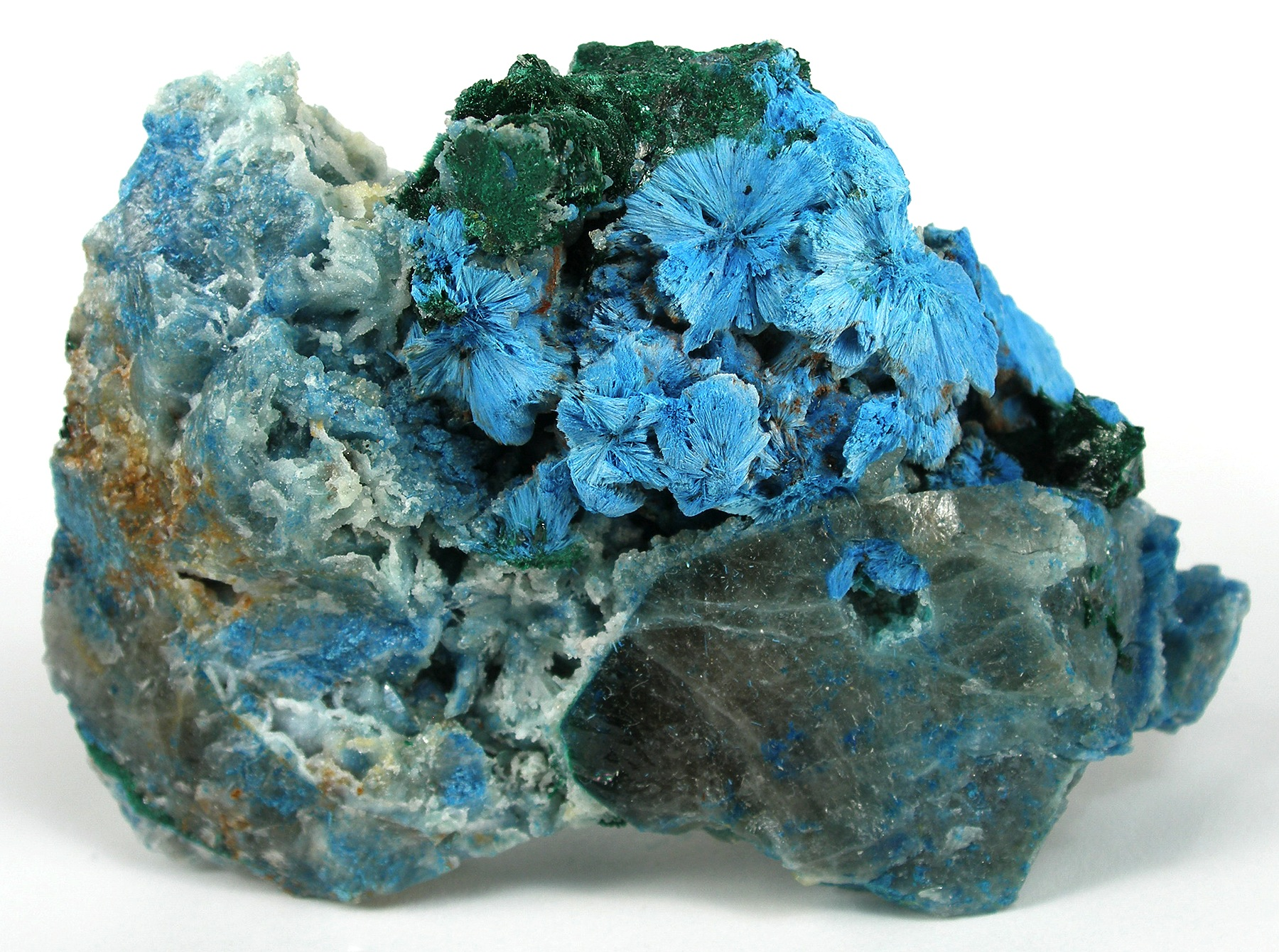
Shattuckite crystals form concentric circular clusters of spraying, elongated, acicular crystals. Associated with them are small bits of contrasting primary malachite crystals in a deep green color

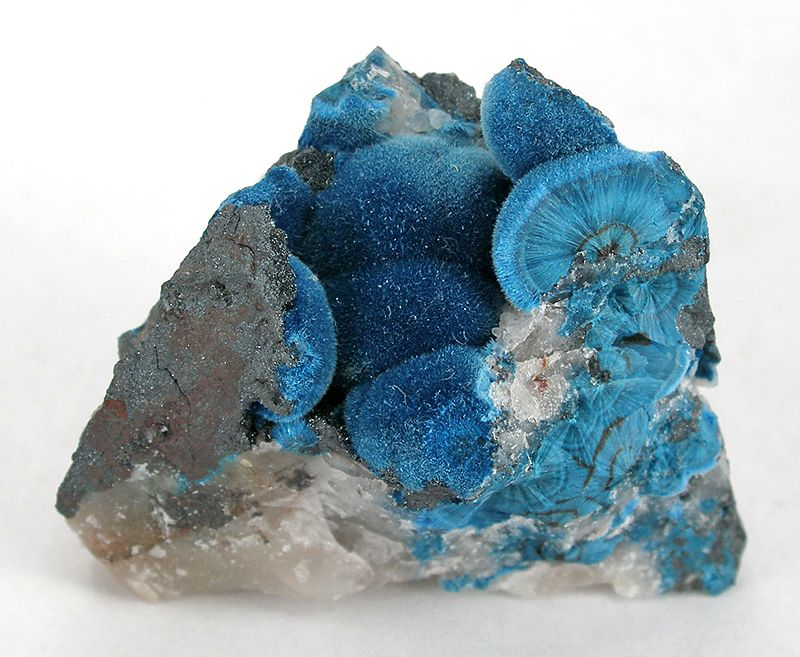
Botryoidal balls of shattuckite, from the Kaokoveld Mine, Kaokoveld Plateau, Kunene Region, Namibia

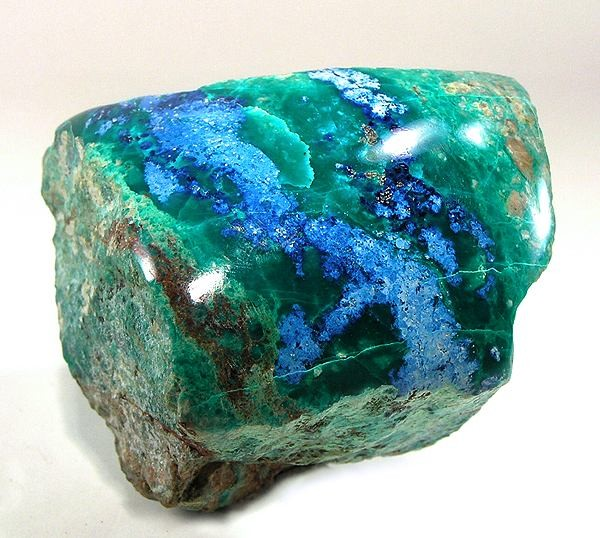
Polished shattuckite with malachite, New Cornelia mine, Ajo, Arizona. Size 5.3 × 5.1 × 5.0 cm
