= Childs Valley =

Landform in Pima and Maricopa Counties, Arizona

- Location within Arizona
- Length: 50 mi (80 km) NW-SE
- Width: 12 mi (19 km)

Geography
- Country: United States
- State: Arizona
- Region: Sonoran Desert
- Districts: Maricopa County, Arizona; Pima County, Arizona
- Population center: Ajo, Arizona
- Borders on: Sentinel Plain; San Cristobal Valley; Growler Valley
- Coordinates: 32°35′30″N 113°8′12″W
- Rivers: Childs Wash; Tenmile Wash
- Interactive map of Childs Valley

The Childs Valley is a valley in the Sonoran Desert of south-central Arizona northwest of Ajo. Upstream sections are located in far western Pima County; downstream it merges into the Gila River Valley in southwestern Maricopa County. Upstream, the valley lies northeast and parallel to the Growler Valley and Growler Mountains.

== Description ==
Childs Valley is northwest trending. The west part of the upper valley contains Daniels Wash which flows north, then west at the north end of the Growler Mountains to meet Growler Wash, the upstream, southern region of the San Cristobal Valley watershed. The eastern part of the upper Childs Valley contains Childs Wash, the western tributary to the Tenmile Wash watershed. The Childs Wash drains the northwest of the Little Ajo Mountains, where Ajo, Arizona is on its east. The east of the Little Ajo's are drained by Tenmile Wash. The Crater Range borders its northeast, and is also the northeast border of Tenmile Wash. The Aguila Mountains border the southwest between the Childs and San Cristobal valleys.

Childs Valley is northwest trending and drains into the Gila River and Park valleys.
