= Granite Mountains (Arizona) =

Landform in Pima County, Arizona

- Location within Arizona

Highest point
- Elevation: 2,490 ft (760 m)

Geography
- Country: United States
- State: Arizona
- Range coordinates: 32°24′14″N 113°18′28″W

The Granite Mountains of Arizona is a mountain range in the Sonoran Desert of southern Arizona. It is located in extreme western Pima County, Arizona, bordering southeast Yuma County. The Granite Mountains are 17.4 mi (28.0 km) long. This range trends mostly northwest-southeast and it turns midrange northerly to align with the Aguila Mountains of Yuma County 6 mi (9.7 km) north. The Granite Mountains range in width from about 0.8 to 1.6 mi (1.3 to 2.6 km) in width.

The Granite Mountains' highest point is unnamed at 2,490 ft (760 m). The west and south end of the mountains lie at the southeastern beginning of the San Cristobal Valley flowing northwest and north to the Gila River Valley. The east side of the range borders the north-flowing Growler Valley. The southern end of the mountains are adjacent to a water divide where south-flowing drainages enter into portions of northern Sonora, Mexico.

== Physiography ==
The Granite Mountains are located in the Sonoran Desert within the Basin and Range Province. It is a physiographic province characterize by alternating parallel alluvial basins and intervening mountain ranges known as basin and range topography. This topography is the result of asymmetric tilted block faulting reflecting crustal extension due to mantle upwelling, gravitational collapse, crustal thickening, or relaxation of confining stresses during more or less the past 17 million years. The Basin and Range Province covers southern, central, and western Arizona and all of Nevada. It also covers parts of California, New Mexico, Oregon, Texas, and Utah, and much of northwestern Mexico.

The Granite Mountains are part of the not very high, north- to northwest-trending mountain ranges and broad, minimally dissected basins that characterize the Sonoran Desert. They are narrow, rugged, but not very lofty. The axis of the Granite Mountains may be quite linear, but their mountain fronts are very embayed, sinuous, and exhibit considerable erosional retreat from the faults that formed them. Very wide piedmonts with minimal topographic relief and gentle slopes extend from the mountains to the axial washes that flow down the central axis of the alluvial valleys. Scattered, outlying bedrock hills, called inselbergs commonly rise above the piedmonts. The pediments continue right up to the sharply defined mountain edges. This, together with the highly sinuous and deeply eroded mountain fronts other geomorphic features indicate that faulting has not occurred for millions of years in this area.

A minimum thickness of colluvium covers these mountains slopes. This reflects the dominance of erosion that is facilitated by uncommon, but intense, rainfall and runoff, steep slopes, and sparse vegetative cover. During glacial and regionally pluvial intervals of the Quaternary, significantly more hillslope colluvium covered bedrock slopes in the mountains. This especially true of mountain ranges composed of granitic or metamorphic rocks.

== Geology ==
The bedrock geology of the Granite Mountains has been mapped on a reconnaissance level. According to this mapping, the bedrock consists of granitic rock of late Cretaceous age intruded into orthogneiss of middle Proterozoic and (or) early Proterozoic age. It is described as light to medium gray or pink, distinctively white-weathering, highly leucocratic, fine-grained to coarse grained, muscovite-biotite-bearing granite and granodiorite. The orthogneiss consists of variety of gneisses. They include, from oldest to youngest: 1. biotite-quartz-feldspar schists and gneisses 2. hornblende-biotite augen gneiss; 3. granitic, typically highly leucocratic, gneiss; 4. amphibolite gneiss; and 5. biotite granitoid gneiss. Three nearby, prominent inselbergs that lie east of the Granite Mountains consist of Oligocene to middle Miocene age, basaltic volcanic rocks, all of which are coated with dark rock varnish. A study of the economic geology of the Granite Mountains in the early 1980s found it lacking in any interesting mineral potential.

== See also ==
- List of mountain ranges of Arizona
