= Ajo, Arizona =

Community in Pima County, Arizona

Ajo
- Unincorporated community and census-designated place
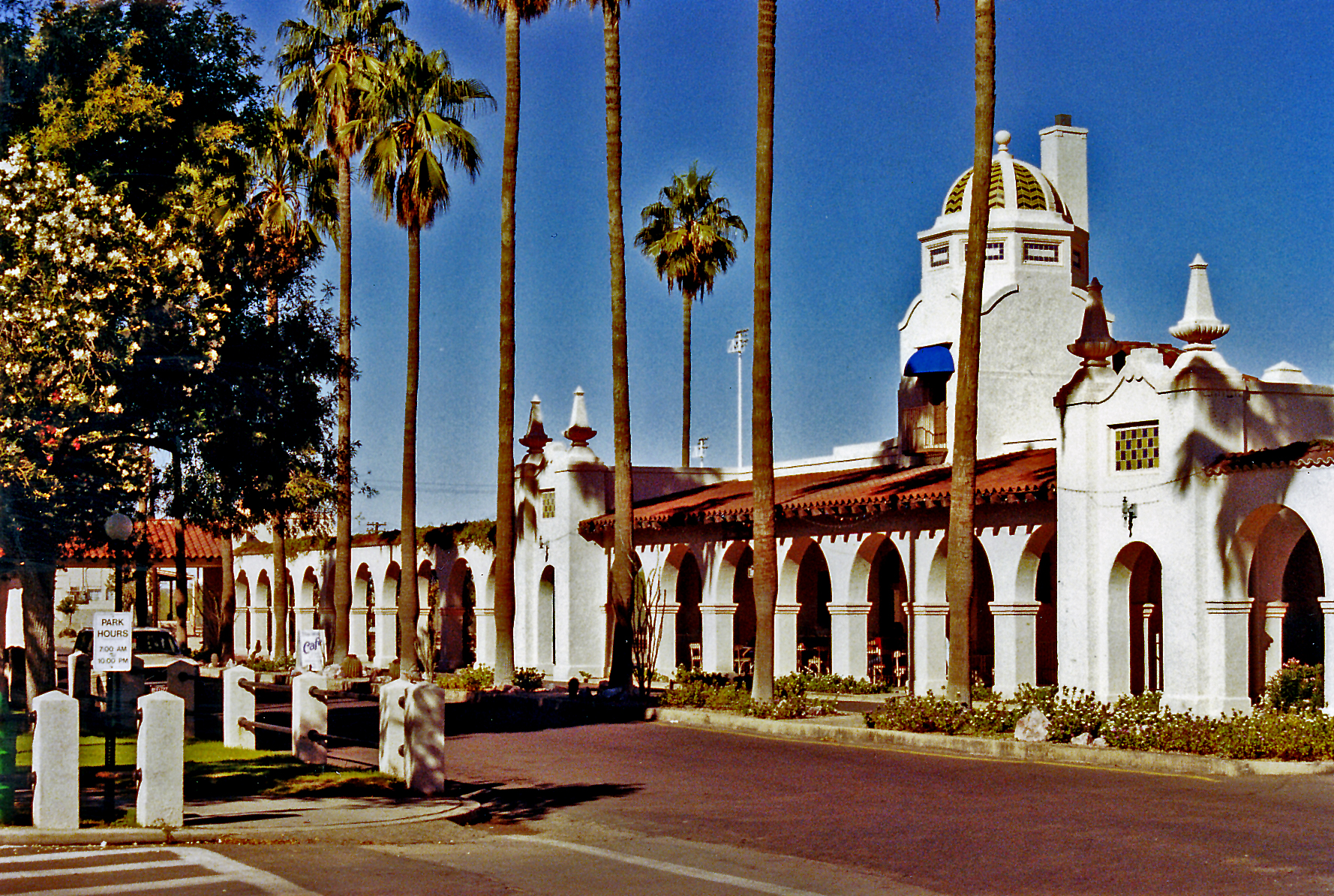
- Ajo plaza in 1990

- Location in Pima County and the state of Arizona

- Location in the United States Location within Arizona
- Coordinates: 32°22′53″N 112°52′10″W
- Country: United States
- State: Arizona
- County: Pima

Area
  - Total: 33.33 sq mi (86.32 km^{2})
  - Land: 33.33 sq mi (86.32 km^{2})
  - Water: 0 sq mi (0.00 km^{2})
- Elevation: 1,759 ft (536 m)

Population (2020)
  - Total: 3,039
  - Density: 91.2/sq mi (35.21/km^{2})
- Time zone: UTC-7 (MST (no daylight saving time))
- ZIP code: 85321
- Area code: 520
- FIPS code: 04-00870
- GNIS feature ID: 0000538

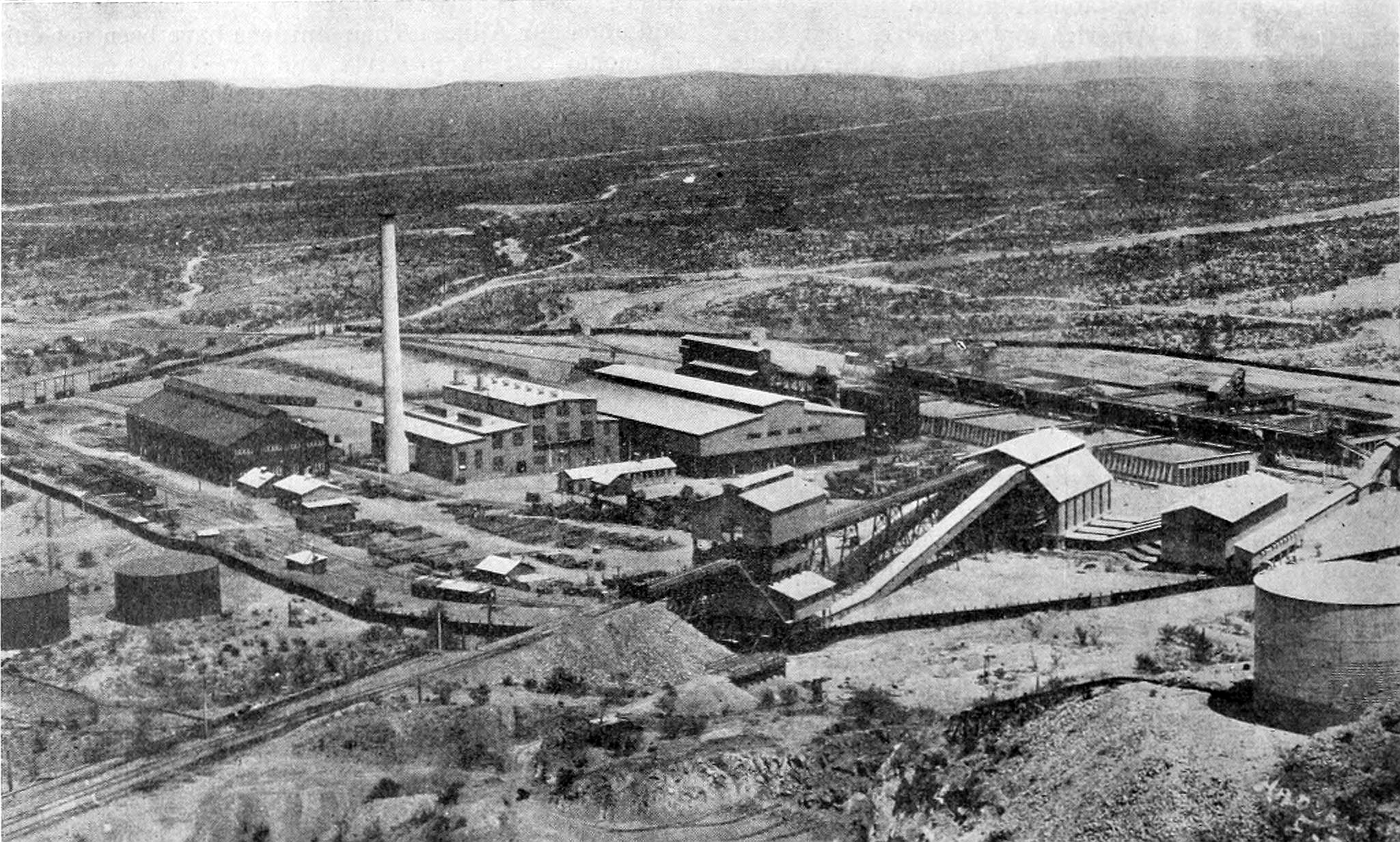
New Cornelia Copper Company in Ajo, 1922

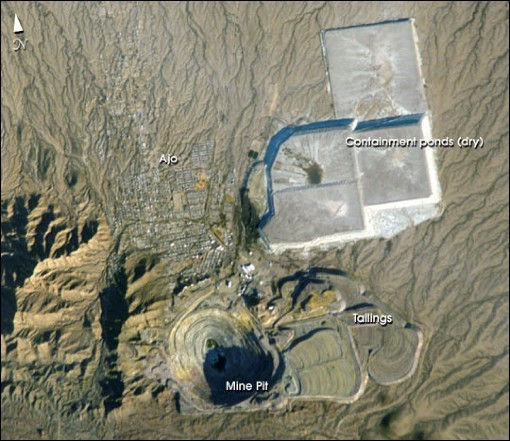
Ajo and the New Cornelia mine. NASA photo

Ajo (/ˈɑːhoʊ/ AH-hoh) is an unincorporated community in Pima County, Arizona, United States. It is the closest community to Organ Pipe Cactus National Monument. The population was 3,039 at the 2020 census. Ajo is located on State Route 85 just 43 miles (69 km) from the Mexican border.

== History ==
Ajo is the Spanish word for garlic (Spanish pronunciation: [ˈaxo]). The Spanish may have named the place using the familiar word in place of the similar-sounding Oʼodham word for paint (oʼoho). The Tohono Oʼodham people obtained red paint pigments from the area.

Native Americans, Spaniards, and Americans have all extracted mineral wealth from Ajo's abundant ore deposits. In the early nineteenth century, there was a Spanish mine nicknamed "Old Bat Hole" that was abandoned due to Indian raids. Tom Childs Sr., found the deserted mine complete with a 60-foot (18 m) shaft, mesquite ladders, and rawhide buckets in 1847. He did not stay long at that time because he was on his way to the silver mines near Magdalena de Kino.

Thirty-five years later, Childs and his son returned with a friend and started developing the abandoned mine.

In the year 1884, the camp at Ajo was practically abandoned. Not a soul was in camp when Tom Childs Sr., and his son arrived. With them was Washington Michael Jacobs of Tucson, Arizona ... Childs and Jacobs located the mining claim which constituted most of the old Ajo group of mines. They made a permanent camp and worked the mines.

High-grade native copper made Ajo the first copper mine in Arizona. Soon the Arizona Mining & Trading company, formed by Peter R. Brady, a friend of Childs, worked the rich surface ores, shipping loads around Cape Horn for smelting in Swansea, Wales, in the mid-1880s. The mine closed when a ship sank off the coast of Patagonia. Long supply lines and the lack of water discouraged large mining companies

With the advent of new recovery methods for low-grade ore, Ajo boomed. In 1911, Col. John Campbell Greenway, a Rough Rider and star Yale athlete, bought the New Cornelia mine from John Boddie. He became general manager of the Calumet and the Arizona mining company and expanded it on a grand scale. The Tucson, Cornelia and Gila Bend Railroad was built from Gila Bend to serve the mining industry and was in service from 1916 to 1985. In 1921, Phelps Dodge, the nation's largest copper company, bought New Cornelia and the mine became the New Cornelia Branch of Phelps Dodge, managed by Michael Curley. For several decades more than 1,000 employees worked for Phelps Dodge in the open pit mine. In 1983 union-affiliated mine employees went on strike. The mine continued with non-union labor for a short while before stopping production in 1985.

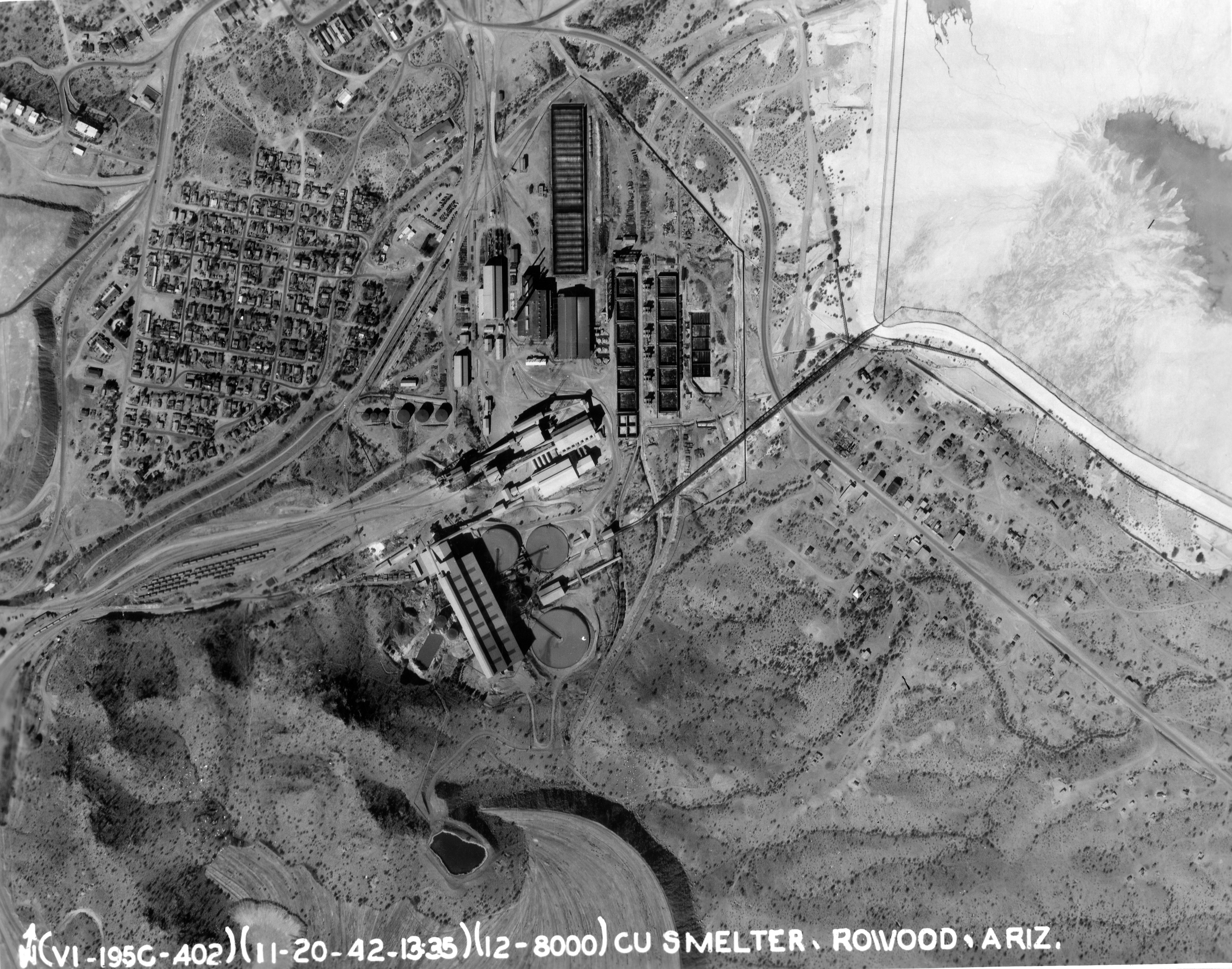
Former Rowood Copper Smelter, 1940s

The town was originally segregated, with neighborhoods called Indian Village and Mexican Town for the non-white residents. Ajo is home to many retired people, Border Patrol agents, and young families.

During the construction of a new border wall in 2019–2020, many workers lived in the RV parks, hotels and rental houses.

== Geography ==
According to the United States Census Bureau, the census-designated place has a total area of 28.1 square miles (72.8 km^{2}), all land. The census definition of the area was created by the Census Bureau for statistical purposes and may not precisely correspond to local understanding of the area with the same name. Ajo is located in the Little Ajo Mountains.

Plants of the Sonoran Desert thrive around Ajo, including saguaros and ocotillos. The Ajo lily or desert lily, an onion-like plant, also grows in the area.

The mineral ajoite was first found at the New Cornelia Mine, Ajo. The rare mineral papagoite was also first described in the New Cornelia mine.

=== Climate ===
This area has a large amount of sunshine year-round due to its stable descending air and high pressure. According to the Köppen Climate Classification system, Ajo has a hot desert climate, abbreviated BWh on climate maps. Rainfall is very low except during occasional monsoonal or frontal incursions, and is especially minimal between April and June. Since 1914 the wettest calendar year has been 1946 with 15.33 inches (389 mm) – including a record daily fall of 4.15 inches (105 mm) on September 18 – and the driest 1928 with 3.33 inches (85 mm). Temperatures are very hot from April to October and mild to warm from November to March, with extremes ranging from 17 °F (−8 °C) on January 22, 1937, during that month's record Western cold wave, to 120 °F (49 °C) on July 20, 2023.

Climate data for Ajo, Arizona (1991–2020 normals, extremes 1915–present)
Month	Jan	Feb	Mar	Apr	May	Jun	Jul	Aug	Sep	Oct	Nov	Dec	Year
Record high °F (°C)	85 (29)	97 (36)	110 (43)	105 (41)	112 (44)	119 (48)	118 (48)	120 (49)	118 (48)	113 (45)	98 (37)	88 (31)	120 (49)
Mean maximum °F (°C)	79.0 (26.1)	82.5 (28.1)	89.7 (32.1)	97.4 (36.3)	103.4 (39.7)	110.4 (43.6)	112.3 (44.6)	111.0 (43.9)	107.5 (41.9)	100.4 (38.0)	88.9 (31.6)	79.2 (26.2)	113.2 (45.1)
Mean daily maximum °F (°C)	67.5 (19.7)	70.5 (21.4)	77.1 (25.1)	84.0 (28.9)	92.0 (33.3)	101.1 (38.4)	103.8 (39.9)	103.0 (39.4)	99.1 (37.3)	89.2 (31.8)	77.4 (25.2)	66.6 (19.2)	85.9 (29.9)
Daily mean °F (°C)	56.2 (13.4)	59.2 (15.1)	64.5 (18.1)	70.7 (21.5)	78.8 (26.0)	87.5 (30.8)	91.7 (33.2)	91.1 (32.8)	86.8 (30.4)	76.7 (24.8)	64.2 (17.9)	55.0 (12.8)	73.5 (23.1)
Mean daily minimum °F (°C)	44.9 (7.2)	47.8 (8.8)	51.8 (11.0)	57.3 (14.1)	65.5 (18.6)	74.0 (23.3)	79.7 (26.5)	79.2 (26.2)	74.4 (23.6)	64.2 (17.9)	51.0 (10.6)	43.4 (6.3)	61.1 (16.2)
Mean minimum °F (°C)	34.6 (1.4)	37.3 (2.9)	40.9 (4.9)	44.5 (6.9)	52.9 (11.6)	62.2 (16.8)	70.1 (21.2)	69.8 (21.0)	63.7 (17.6)	50.9 (10.5)	40.2 (4.6)	34.3 (1.3)	31.9 (−0.1)
Record low °F (°C)	17 (−8)	22 (−6)	27 (−3)	33 (1)	31 (−1)	44 (7)	58 (14)	52 (11)	41 (5)	32 (0)	30 (−1)	22 (−6)	17 (−8)
Average precipitation inches (mm)	0.69 (18)	0.80 (20)	0.76 (19)	0.17 (4.3)	0.10 (2.5)	0.08 (2.0)	0.63 (16)	1.43 (36)	0.81 (21)	0.44 (11)	0.45 (11)	0.62 (16)	6.98 (176.8)
Average snowfall inches (cm)	0.1 (0.25)	0.0 (0.0)	0.0 (0.0)	0.0 (0.0)	0.0 (0.0)	0.0 (0.0)	0.0 (0.0)	0.0 (0.0)	0.0 (0.0)	0.0 (0.0)	0.0 (0.0)	0.0 (0.0)	0.1 (0.25)
Average precipitation days (≥ 0.01 in)	2.2	2.7	2.1	0.9	0.6	0.4	2.9	4.6	2.1	1.4	0.8	2.5	23.2
Average snowy days (≥ 0.1 in)	0.1	0.0	0.0	0.0	0.0	0.0	0.0	0.0	0.0	0.0	0.0	0.0	0.1
Source: National Oceanic and Atmospheric Administration

== Demographics ==
Historical population
Census	Pop.	Note	%±
1920	2,336		—
1930	4,571		95.7%
1950	5,817		—
1960	7,049		21.2%
1970	5,881		−16.6%
1980	5,189		−11.8%
1990	2,919		−43.7%
2000	3,705		26.9%
2010	3,304		−10.8%
2020	3,039		−8.0%

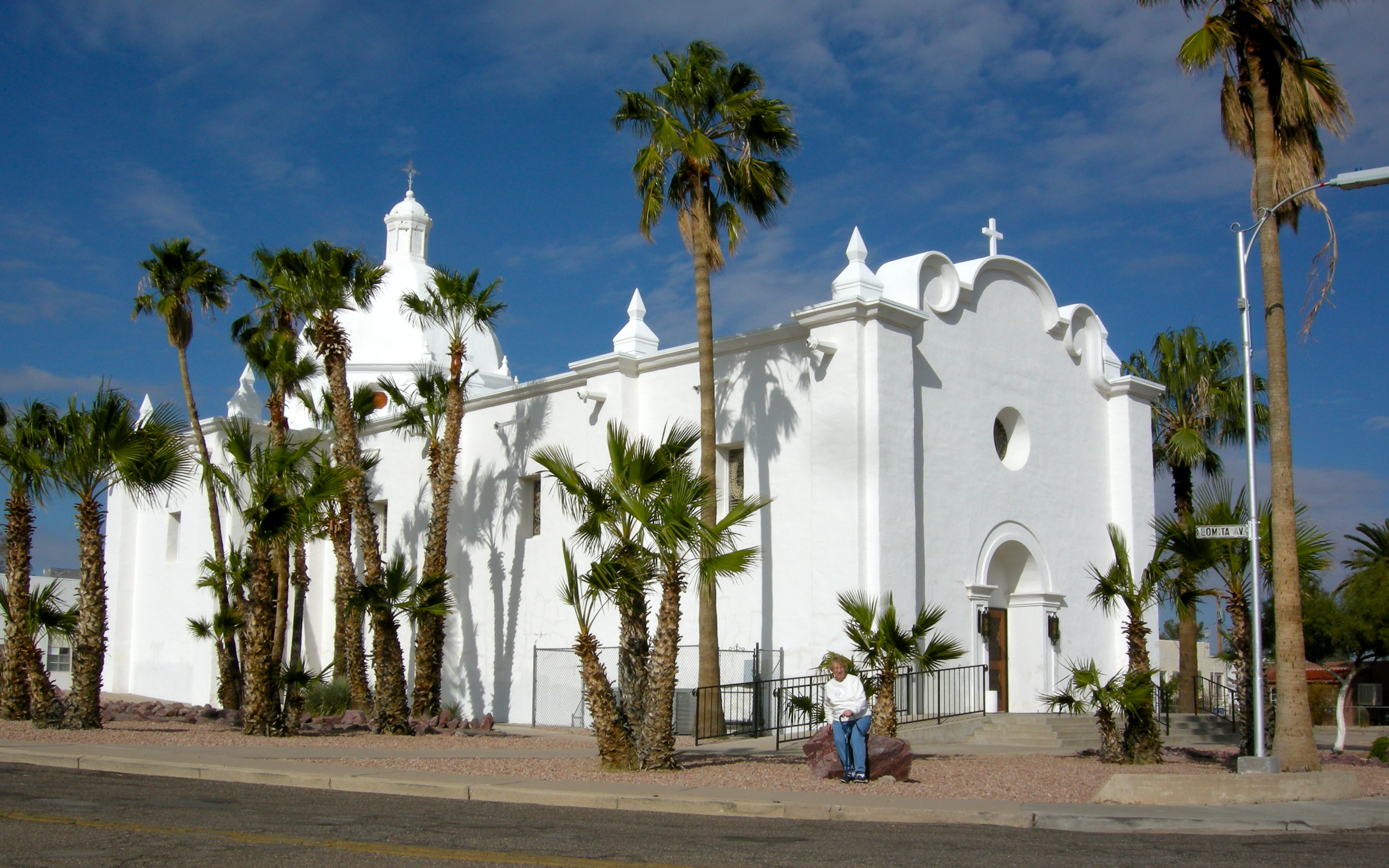
The Immaculate Conception Church in Ajo

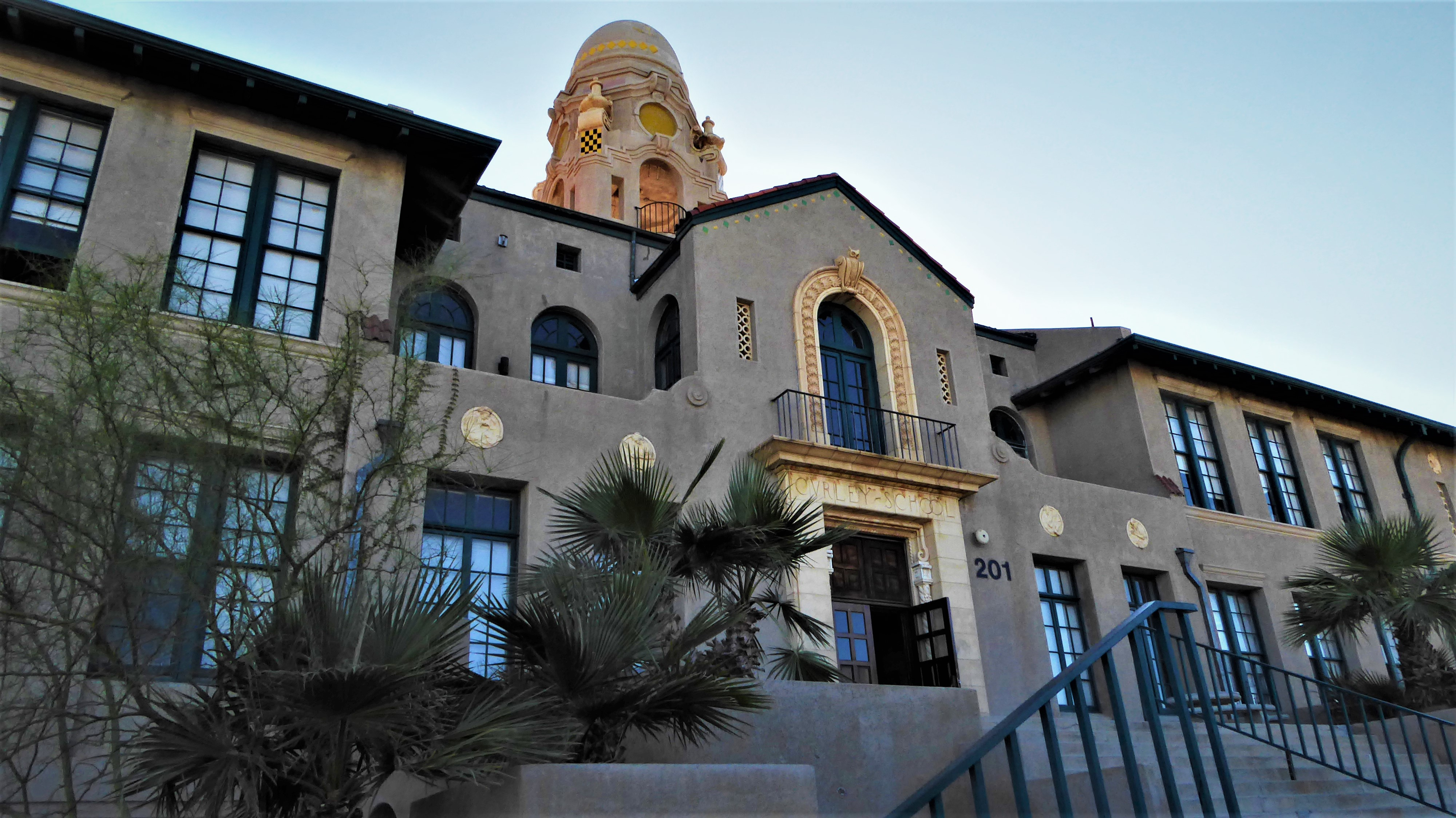
The former Curley School, currently re-purposed as artisan apartments

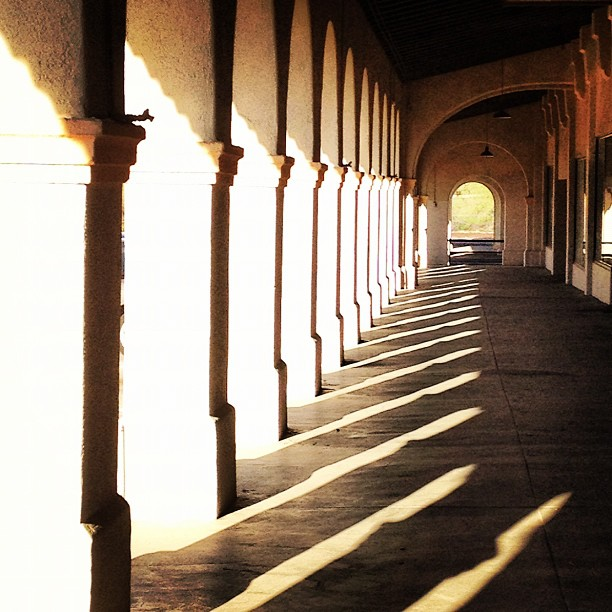
In the Ajo plaza, 2012

=== Racial and ethnic composition ===
Ajo CDP, Arizona – Racial composition Note: the US Census treats Hispanic/Latino as an ethnic category. This table excludes Latinos from the racial categories and assigns them to a separate category. Hispanics/Latinos may be of any race.
Race (NH = Non-Hispanic)	2020	2010	2000	1990	1980
White alone (NH)	51.7% (1,572)	52.1% (1,723)	54.4% (2,015)	48.1% (1,404)	41.3% (2,144)
Black alone (NH)	0.8% (23)	0.5% (16)	0.1% (5)	0.1% (4)	0.8% (42)
American Indian alone (NH)	6.1% (186)	6.6% (217)	5.8% (216)	8.2% (238)	12.2% (633)
Asian alone (NH)	1.9% (59)	0.9% (31)	0.3% (10)	0.6% (17)	0.6% (32)
Pacific Islander alone (NH)	0.1% (3)	0.1% (3)	0.1% (2)		
Other race alone (NH)	0.2% (7)	0% (1)	0% (0)	0% (0)	0.7% (35)
Multiracial (NH)	2.8% (85)	1.4% (47)	1.8% (65)	—	—
Hispanic/Latino (any race)	36.3% (1,104)	38.3% (1,266)	37.6% (1,392)	43% (1,256)	44.4% (2,303)

=== 2020 census ===
As of the 2020 census, Ajo had a population of 3,039. The median age was 55.9 years. 15.0% of residents were under the age of 18 and 36.6% were 65 years of age or older. For every 100 females, there were 100.5 males, and for every 100 females age 18 and over, there were 100.9 males age 18 and over.

0.0% of residents lived in urban areas, while 100.0% lived in rural areas.

There were 1,472 households, of which 15.8% had children under the age of 18 living in them. Of all households, 35.7% were married-couple households, 26.4% were households with a male householder and no spouse or partner present, and 30.6% were households with a female householder and no spouse or partner present. About 43.6% of all households were made up of individuals, and 24.4% had someone living alone who was 65 years of age or older.

There were 2,051 housing units, of which 28.2% were vacant. The homeowner vacancy rate was 3.6% and the rental vacancy rate was 12.8%.

The most reported ancestries in 2020 were:

- Mexican (33%)
- English (12.3%)
- German (10.2%)
- Irish (8.1%)
- Tohono O'odham Nation of Arizona (7%)
- Scottish (2.3%)
- French (2.1%)
- Italian (1.6%)
- Polish (1.2%)
- Filipino (1.2%)

Ajo first appeared on the 1920 U.S. Census as (Pima County) Ajo Precincts Number 1 (pop. 2,040) and 2 (pop. 296). In 1930, it simply appeared as the Ajo Precinct. It featured a White racial plurality in the latter census. With the combination of all county precincts into 3 districts in 1940, it did not formally appear again until 1950, when it reported as an unincorporated village. In 1980, it was designated a census-designated place (CDP).

At its peak population in 1960 (7,049), it was the second-largest community in Pima County behind Tucson. In both 1950 and 1960, it was the 16th largest community in Arizona.

=== 2000 census ===
As of the census of 2000, there were 3,705 people, 1,659 households, and 1,088 families residing in the CDP. The population density was 132.0/sq mi (51.0/km^{2}). There were 2,485 housing units at an average density of 88.5/sq mi (34.2/km^{2}). The racial makeup of the CDP was 78.7% White, 0.2% Black or African American, 6.9% Native American, 0.3% Asian, 0.1% Pacific Islander, 9.2% from other races, and 4.6% from two or more races. 37.6% of the population were Hispanic or Latino of any race.

There were 1,659 households, out of which 19.7% had children under the age of 18 living with them, 51.4% were married couples living together, 10.6% had a female householder with no husband present, and 34.4% were non-families. 30.1% of all households were made up of individuals, and 17.1% had someone living alone who was 65 years of age or older. The average household size was 2.23 and the average family size was 2.74.

In the CDP the population was spread out, with 20.6% under the age of 18, 4.9% from 18 to 24, 17.2% from 25 to 44, 25.3% from 45 to 64, and 32.1% who were 65 years of age or older. The median age was 52 years. For every 100 females, there were 90.3 males. For every 100 females age 18 and over, there were 88.3 males.

The median income for a household in the CDP was $25,618, and the median income for a family was $29,310. Males had a median income of $28,000 versus $18,571 for females. The per capita income for the CDP was $14,548. About 16.5% of families and 22.3% of the population were below the poverty line, including 36.5% of those under age 18 and 9.0% of those age 65 or over.

== Education ==
Ajo Unified School District is the only regular school district covering portions of the Ajo CDP, while another portion is not in any school district.

The CDP is in Pima County Joint Technical Education District's 3rd Governing Board District. An elementary school, middle school, and high school are located on the same campus.

== Public Safety ==
The CDP is served by the Pima County Sheriff's Department's Ajo District, Ajo Ambulance and the Ajo-Gibson Volunteer Fire Department.
