= National Register of Historic Places listings in Santa Cruz County, Arizona =

Location of Santa Cruz County in Arizona

This is intended to be a complete list of the properties and districts on the National Register of Historic Places in Santa Cruz County, Arizona, United States. The locations of National Register properties and districts for which the latitude and longitude coordinates are included below, may be seen in a map.

There are 53 properties and districts listed on the National Register in the county, including 3 that are also National Historic Landmarks.

This National Park Service list is complete through NPS recent listings posted September 4, 2026.

== Current listings ==
	Name on the Register	Image	Date listed	Location	City or town	Description
1	10 Cottages on Short Street	10 Cottages on Short Street	August 29, 1985 (#85001873)	Short Street; 31°20′00″N 110°56′16″W	Nogales	
2	Arizona-Sonora Manufacturing Company Machine Shop	Arizona-Sonora Manufacturing Company Machine Shop	August 29, 1985 (#85001851)	Grand Ave. at Arroyo Boulevard; 31°20′24″N 110°56′17″W	Nogales	
3	Atascosa Lookout House	Atascosa Lookout House	January 28, 1988 (#87002462)	Coronado National Forest; 31°25′33″N 111°08′47″W	Tubac vicinity	Lookout cabin destroyed, other structures damaged by 2011 fire
4	Barrio de Tubac Archeological District		September 12, 2003 (#03000912)	Address Restricted	Tubac	
5	Bowman Hotel	Bowman Hotel	August 29, 1985 (#85001852)	245 Grand Ave. 31°20′13″N 110°56′24″W	Nogales	
6	W.G. Bowman House	W.G. Bowman House	August 29, 1985 (#85001850)	613 Sierra; 31°20′34″N 110°56′13″W	Nogales	
7	Burton Building	Burton Building	August 29, 1985 (#85001848)	253 Grand Ave. 31°20′14″N 110°56′24″W	Nogales	
8	Cady Hall	Cady Hall	December 2, 1992 (#92001635)	346 Duquesne; 31°32′20″N 110°45′14″W	Patagonia	Now the Patagonia Public Library.
9	Calabasas	Calabasas	June 3, 1971 (#71000118)	North of Nogales; 31°27′09″N 110°57′34″W	Rio Rico	
10	Canelo Ranger Station	Canelo Ranger Station	June 10, 1993 (#93000513)	Forest Rd. 52B north of Canelo in the Coronado National Forest; 31°33′05″N 110°30′59″W	Canelo	
11	Canelo School	Canelo School	July 31, 1991 (#91000981)	18 miles southeast of Sonoita on State Route 93; 31°32′32″N 110°30′36″W	Canelo	
12	Frank F. Cranz House	Frank F. Cranz House	August 29, 1985 (#85001849)	321 Arroyo; 31°20′19″N 110°56′25″W	Nogales	
13	Crawford Hill Historic Residential District	Crawford Hill Historic Residential District	August 29, 1985 (#85001874)	Roughly bounded by Oak St., Terrace Ave., Compound St., and Interstate 19 and Grindell; 31°20′07″N 110°56′12″W	Nogales	
14	George Dunbar House	George Dunbar House	August 29, 1985 (#85001853)	605 Sierra; 31°20′34″N 110°56′14″W	Nogales	
15	James Finley House	James Finley House	November 19, 1974 (#74000462)	7.2 miles southwest of Patagonia in the Coronado National Forest; 31°27′55″N 110°42′24″W	Harshaw	
16	Guevavi Mission Ruins	Guevavi Mission Ruins	November 5, 1971 (#71000119)	6 miles north of U.S./Mexico border 31°24′36″N 110°54′10″W	Nogales vicinity	
17	Sen. James A. Harrison House	Sen. James A. Harrison House	August 29, 1985 (#85001854)	Morley Avenue; 31°20′17″N 110°56′12″W	Nogales	
18	Hotel Blanca	Hotel Blanca	August 29, 1985 (#85001861)	456 Morley Avenue; 31°20′26″N 110°56′04″W	Nogales	
19	House at 220 Walnut Street	House at 220 Walnut Street	August 29, 1985 (#85001856)	365 Walnut St. 31°20′21″N 110°56′32″W	Nogales	
20	House at 334–338 Walnut Street	House at 334–338 Walnut Street	August 29, 1985 (#85001857)	459–465 Walnut St. 31°20′24″N 110°56′39″W	Nogales	
21	House at 665 Morley Avenue	House at 665 Morley Avenue	August 29, 1985 (#85001858)	Morley Avenue; 31°20′25″N 110°56′04″W	Nogales	
22	Kentucky Camp Historic District	Kentucky Camp Historic District	November 22, 1995 (#95001312)	Near Forest Road 163 off State Route 83; 31°44′13″N 110°43′43″W	Coronado National Forest	
23	Pete Kitchen Ranch	Pete Kitchen Ranch	February 20, 1975 (#75000360)	3.5 miles north of Nogales off U.S. Route 89; 31°24′08″N 110°57′16″W	Nogales vicinity	
24	S.H. Kress & Co. Building	S.H. Kress & Co. Building	August 29, 1985 (#85001859)	48 N. Morley Ave. 31°20′01″N 110°56′27″W	Nogales	
25	Las Dos Naciones Cigar Factory	Las Dos Naciones Cigar Factory	August 29, 1985 (#85001860)	204 Morley Ave. 31°20′09″N 110°56′20″W	Nogales	
26	The Little Outfit Schoolhouse	The Little Outfit Schoolhouse	January 8, 2009 (#08001275)	571 Canelo Pass Road; 31°29′43″N 110°34′25″W	Patagonia vicinity	Ranch school opened 1940, grades 3 to 8, teaching ideals of the West
27	Marsh Heights Historic District	Marsh Heights Historic District	October 29, 1985 (#85003407)	Roughly bounded by Court St., Summit Ave., S. Court St., and Morley Ave. 31°20′09″N 110°56′38″W	Nogales	
28	George B. Marsh Building	George B. Marsh Building	August 29, 1985 (#85001855)	142–154 Grand Ave. 31°20′07″N 110°56′26″W	Nogales	
29	Mediterranean Style House	Mediterranean Style House	August 29, 1985 (#85001863)	215 Walnut Street; 31°20′18″N 110°56′27″W	Nogales	
30	Mediterranean Style House	Mediterranean Style House	August 29, 1985 (#85001862)	245 Walnut Street; 31°20′19″N 110°56′28″W	Nogales	
31	Hugo Miller House	Hugo Miller House	August 29, 1985 (#85001864)	565 Potrero; 31°20′33″N 110°56′08″W	Nogales	
32	Montezuma Hotel	Montezuma Hotel	August 29, 1985 (#85001867)	108–120 Morley Avenue; 31°20′03″N 110°56′25″W	Nogales	
33	Nogales Electric Light, Ice & Water Company Power House	Nogales Electric Light, Ice & Water Company Power House	August 29, 1985 (#85001865)	491 Grand Avenue; 31°20′26″N 110°56′14″W	Nogales	
34	Nogales High School	Nogales High School	August 29, 1985 (#85001866)	310 W. Plum St. 31°20′25″N 110°56′28″W	Nogales	
35	Nogales Steam Laundry Building	Nogales Steam Laundry Building	August 29, 1985 (#85001868)	223–219 East; 31°20′03″N 110°56′19″W	Nogales	
36	A.S. Noon Building	A.S. Noon Building	August 29, 1985 (#85001871)	185 Grand Avenue; 31°20′11″N 110°56′26″W	Nogales	
37	Old Nogales City Hall and Fire Station	Old Nogales City Hall and Fire Station	April 3, 1980 (#80000772)	136 Grand Avenue; 31°20′05″N 110°56′27″W	Nogales	
38	Old Tubac Schoolhouse	Old Tubac Schoolhouse	November 10, 1970 (#70000115)	Tubac Presidio State Historic Park; 31°36′43″N 111°02′48″W	Tubac	
39	Pennington Rural Historic Landscape		February 10, 2000 (#00000004)	North of the junction of Royal Rd. and Calle Del Rio; 31°20′55″N 110°50′52″W	Nogales vicinity	
40	Jose Piscorski Building	Jose Piscorski Building	August 29, 1985 (#85001870)	186–190 Morley Avenue; 31°20′08″N 110°56′21″W	Nogales	
41	Ruby	Ruby	April 28, 1975 (#75000361)	North of the U.S./Mexico border between Ruby and Montana peaks 31°29′01″N 111°14′14″W	Ruby	
42	San Rafael Ranch Historic District	San Rafael Ranch Historic District	February 7, 2008 (#08000001)	San Rafael Valley; 31°21′14″N 110°36′47″W	Lochiel vicinity	
43	Santa Cruz Bridge No. 1	Santa Cruz Bridge No. 1	September 30, 1988 (#88001635)	South River Rd. over the Santa Cruz River; 31°23′20″N 110°52′28″W	Nogales vicinity	
44	Santa Cruz County Courthouse	Santa Cruz County Courthouse	December 7, 1977 (#77000239)	Court Street and Morley Avenue; 31°20′11″N 110°56′16″W	Nogales	
45	Three Mediterranean Cottages on Pajarito Street	Three Mediterranean Cottages on Pajarito Street	August 29, 1985 (#85001872)	141 and 147 Pajarito, 533 Potrero; 31°20′30″N 110°56′11″W	Nogales	
46	Tubac Presidio	Tubac Presidio	December 2, 1970 (#70000116)	Broadway and River Rd. 31°36′44″N 111°02′47″W	Tubac	
47	Tubac Townsite Historic District	Tubac Townsite Historic District	October 17, 1994 (#94001195)	Roughly bounded by Tubac and Plaza Rds. and Presidio Dr. 31°36′44″N 111°02′43″W	Tubac	
48	Tumacacori Museum	Tumacacori Museum	May 28, 1987 (#87001437)	Tumacácori National Historical Park; 31°34′04″N 111°03′04″W	Tumacacori	
49	Tumacacori National Monument	Tumacacori National Monument	October 15, 1966 (#66000193)	18 miles (29 km) north of Nogales on Interstate 19; 31°34′07″N 111°03′03″W	Tumacacori	Mission site that was declared a National Monument and has since been converted to a National Historical Park
50	US Custom House	US Custom House	August 6, 1987 (#87001344)	Junction of International and Terrace Sts. 31°19′59″N 110°56′36″W	Nogales	
51	U.S. Custom House and U.S. Inspection Office, Morley Gate-Nogales, Arizona	U.S. Custom House and U.S. Inspection Office, Morley Gate-Nogales, Arizona	August 9, 2016 (#14000244)	International St. at Morley Ave. 31°19′58″N 110°56′29″W	Nogales	
52	US Post Office and Immigration Station-Nogales Main	US Post Office and Immigration Station-Nogales Main	December 3, 1985 (#85003107)	Hudgin St. and Morley Ave. 31°20′15″N 110°56′14″W	Nogales	
53	J.E. Wise Building	J.E. Wise Building	August 29, 1985 (#85001869)	87 N. Grand Avenue; 31°20′04″N 110°56′30″W	Nogales	

== See also ==
- List of National Historic Landmarks in Arizona
- National Register of Historic Places listings in Arizona
