= Zolya Talma =

American actress

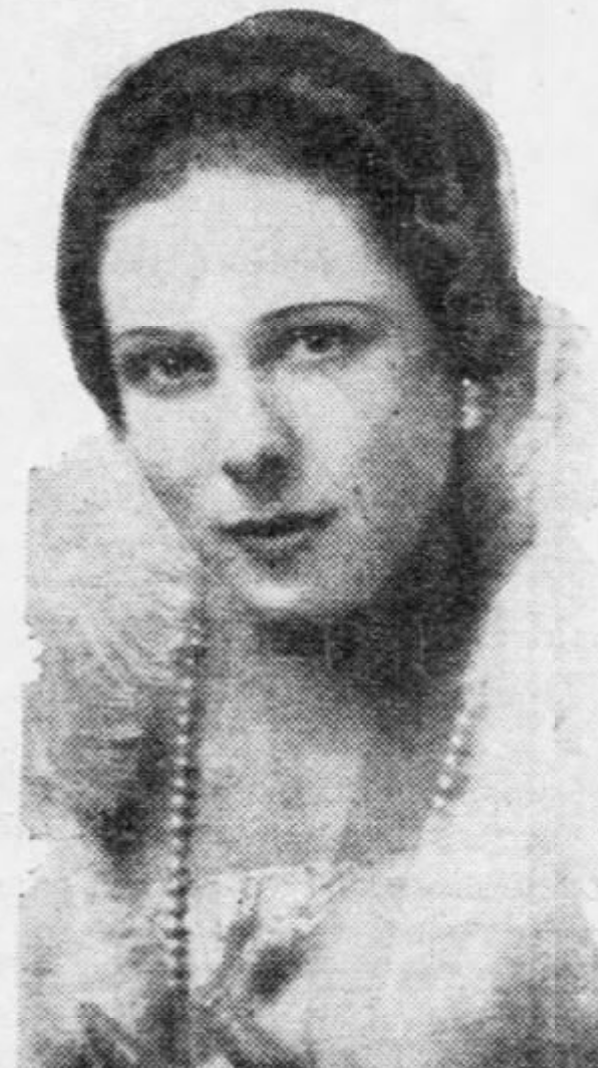
- Zolya Talma, from a 1929 newspaper
- Born: Emma Valentina Cranz; February 14, 1895; Pasadena, California, U.S.
- Died: November 26, 1983 (aged 88); Los Angeles, California, U.S.
- Other name: Zola Talma
- Occupation: Actress

Zolya Valentina Talma (February 14, 1895 – November 26, 1983), born Emma Valentina Cranz, sometimes credited as Zola Talma, was an American actress who began her career in silent films, performed in dozens of Broadway productions, and was a character actress on television programs from 1949 to 1974.

== Biography ==
Talma was born in Pasadena, California, the daughter of William S. Cranz and Dolores (Lola) Cranz, though she sometimes claimed she was from Barcelona. Her mother was a German-speaking nurse born in Mexico. Her father was involved in silver mining, and died in 1912. As a girl she was a student at the Egan School of Music and Drama. Talma lived in New York City with an uncle in 1915, and with Australian actress Margaret Linden and her sons in 1920. Playwright Augustus Thomas suggested her stage name.

Talma had a career in films, on stage in comedies and dramas, and on television, from the 1910s into the 1970s. She died in 1983, at the age of 88, in Los Angeles.

Her uncle Franklin F. Cranz was mayor of Nogales, Arizona, from 1904 to 1906. The Frank F. Cranz House is on the National Register of Historic Places.

=== Films ===
- Outcast (1917, silent film)
- On with the Dance (1920 silent film)
- The Rose Tattoo (1955)

=== Broadway ===
- Her Honor, the Mayor (1918)
- Mis' Nelly of N'Orleans (1919)
- The Checkerboard (1920)
- Near Santa Barbara (1921)
- The Morning After (1925)
- The Love Song (1925)
- Stronger than Love (1925)
- Mama Loves Papa (1926)
- Kept (1926)
- Where's Your Husband? (1927)
- Lally (1927)
- Interference (1928)
- The Great Necker (1928)
- Zeppelin (1929)
- Evensong (1933)
- Prisoners of War (1935)
- The World We Make (1939)
- Romantic Mr. Dickens (1940)
- For Keeps (1944)
- Sadie Thompson (1944)
- Bravo! (1948)
- Diamond Lil (1951)

=== Other stage work ===
- Spanish Love (1921, Washington, D.C.}
- Ink (1927, Werba's Brooklyn Theater)
- Revelry (1927, Garrick Theatre, Philadelphia)
- Gutter Cousins (1929, Greenwich Theatre)
- Blaze of Glory (1934, Court Square Theater, Massachusetts)
- Ladies in Retirement (1941, Ogunquit Playhouse, Maine)
- The Late Christopher Bean (1947, the Cape Playhouse)
- The Skin of Our Teeth (1948, Berkshire Playhouse, Massachusetts)
- Gigi (1954, Town and Country Playhouse, Indianapolis)
- Thieves' Paradise (1956, Shubert, Washington, D.C.)
- The Matchmaker (1957, Alley Theater, Houston)
- And When It Rains (1961, Santa Barbara)

=== Television ===
- The Clock (1949, one episode)
- The Chevrolet Tele-Theatre (1949, one episode)
- Lights Out (1949, one episode, Pengallen's Bell)
- The Ford Theatre Hour (1949, one episode)
- The Web (1951, one episode)
- Hallmark Hall of Fame (1952, one episode)
- Guiding Light (1952, soap opera)
- Omnibus: Henry V, Act 5, Scene 2 (1953, one episode)
- Crown of Audubon (1953, TV movie)
- Proudly I Love (1953, TV movie)
- Rocky King Detective (1954, one episode)
- Martin Kane, Private Eye (1953, 1954, 2 episodes)
- Robert Montgomery Presents (1952, 1955, two episodes)
- Kraft Television Theatre (1955, one episode)
- Studio One (1953, 1956, two episodes)
- The Asphalt Jungle (1961, one episode)
- Cain's Hundred (1962, one episode)
- The Eleventh Hour (1963, one episode)
- Breaking Point (1963, one episode)
- The Alfred Hitchcock Hour (1963, 1965, two episodes)
- The Big Valley (1965, one episode)
- Jericho (1966, one episode)
- The Felony Squad (1968, one episode)
- Adam-12 (1968, one episode)
- Ironside (1969, one episode)
- The Other Man (1970, TV movie)
- Houston, We've Got a Problem (1974, TV movie)
