= Mediterranean Style House =

Mediterranean Style House may refer to:

- Mediterranean Style House (116 Walnut Street, Nogales, Arizona), listed on the National Register of Historic Places listings in Santa Cruz County, Arizona
- Mediterranean Style House (124 Walnut Street, Nogales, Arizona), listed on the National Register of Historic Places listings in Santa Cruz County, Arizona
- Mediterranean Revival architecture, a design style popular in the early twentieth century
