= United States Custom House (Nogales, Arizona) =

- U.S. National Register of Historic Places
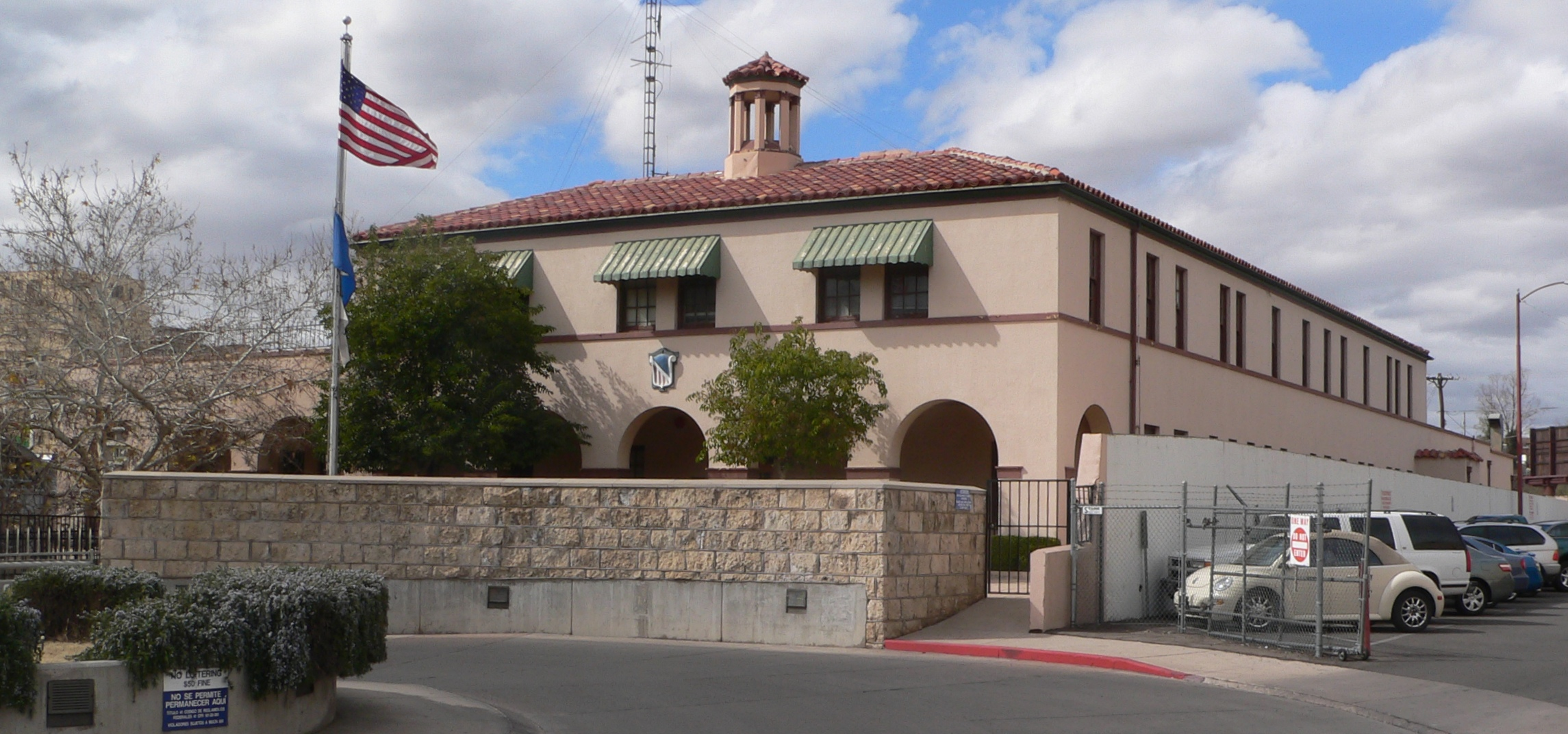
- The building in 2012

- Location within Arizona
- Location: Junction of International and Terrace Streets, Nogales, Arizona
- Coordinates: 31°19′59″N 110°56′33″W
- Area: less than one acre
- Built: 1934
- Architect: Louis A. Simon
- Architectural style: Period Revival
- MPS: Nogales MRA
- NRHP reference No.: 87001344
- Added to NRHP: August 6, 1987

The United States Custom House is a historic building in Nogales, Arizona. It was built in 1934 for the United States Customs Service, and designed in the Period Revival style by architect Louis A. Simon. It has been listed on the National Register of Historic Places since August 6, 1987.
