= Nogales Steam Laundry Building =

- U.S. National Register of Historic Places
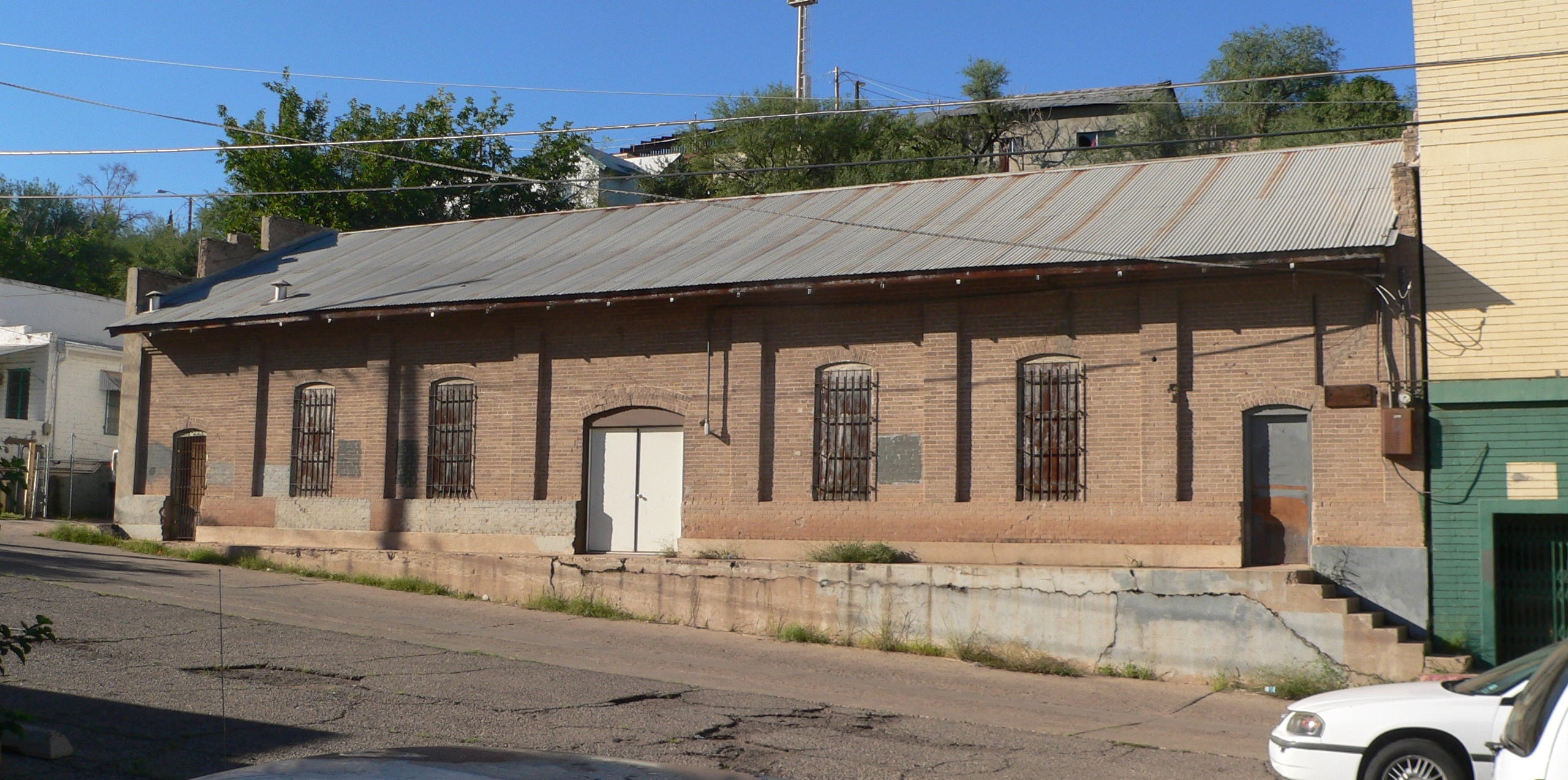
- The building in 2013

- Location within Arizona
- Location: 223--219 East, Nogales, Arizona
- Coordinates: 31°20′02″N 110°56′17″W
- Area: 0 acres (0 ha)
- Built by: Charles Moody
- Architectural style: Chicago school
- MPS: Nogales MRA
- NRHP reference No.: 85001868
- Added to NRHP: August 29, 1985

The Nogales Steam Laundry Building is a historic building in Nogales, Arizona. It was built by Charles Moody in 1915 for W. J. Neuman, a photographer and property owner, and designed in the Chicago school architectural style. It housed a laundromat until the 1930s. It has been listed on the National Register of Historic Places since August 29, 1985.
