= George B. Marsh Building =

- Marsh, George B., Building
- U.S. National Register of Historic Places
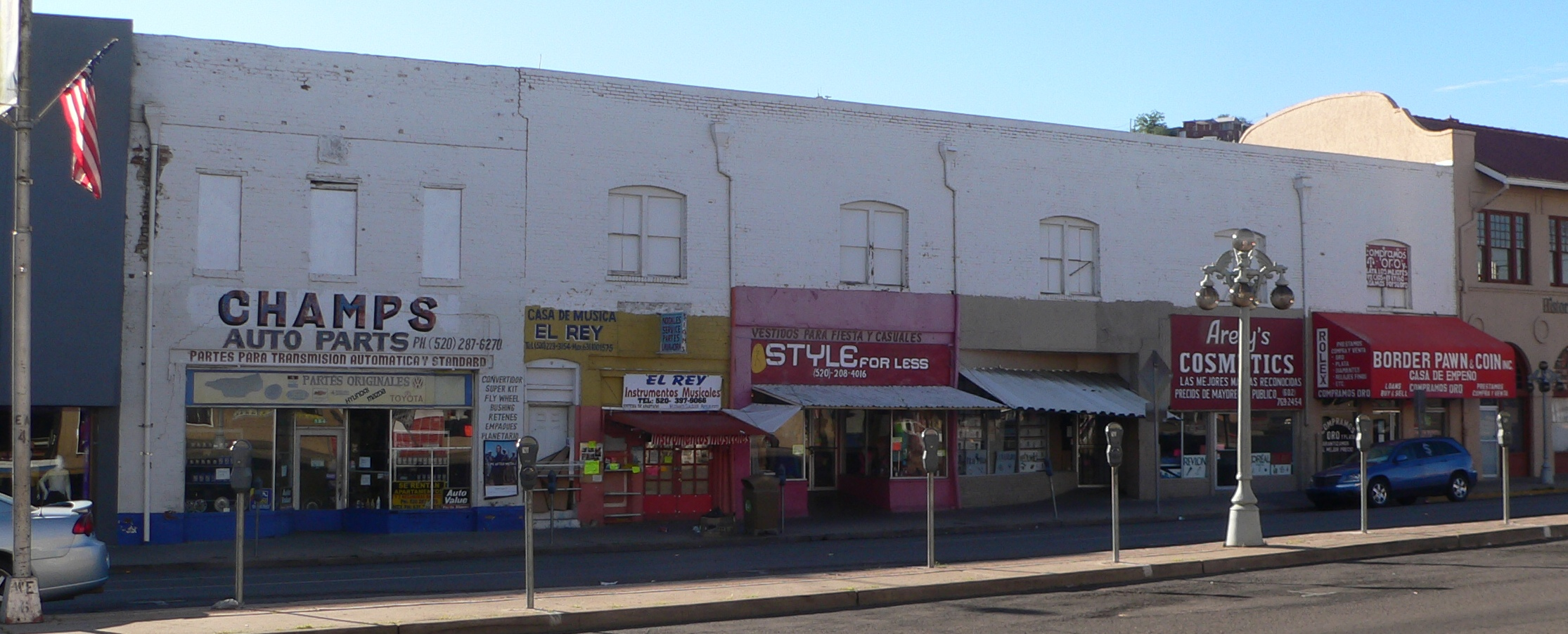
- The building in 2013

- Location within Arizona
- Location: 213–225 Grand, Nogales, Arizona
- Coordinates: 31°20′08″N 110°56′22″W
- Area: 0 acres (0 ha)
- Architectural style: Chicago school
- MPS: Nogales MRA
- NRHP reference No.: 85001855
- Added to NRHP: August 29, 1985

The George B. Marsh Building is a historic building in Nogales, Arizona. It was built between 1905 and 1914 for businessman George B. Marsh, and designed in the Chicago school architectural style. The first building completed was the post office in 1905, followed by the George B. Marsh Building for Fulton Market in July 1905, the George B. Marsh Building in 1906, and the Oasis Printing Building in 1911. It has been listed on the National Register of Historic Places since August 29, 1985.
