= A.S. Noon Building =

Historic building in Nogales, Arizona, US

- A. S. Noon Building
- U.S. National Register of Historic Places
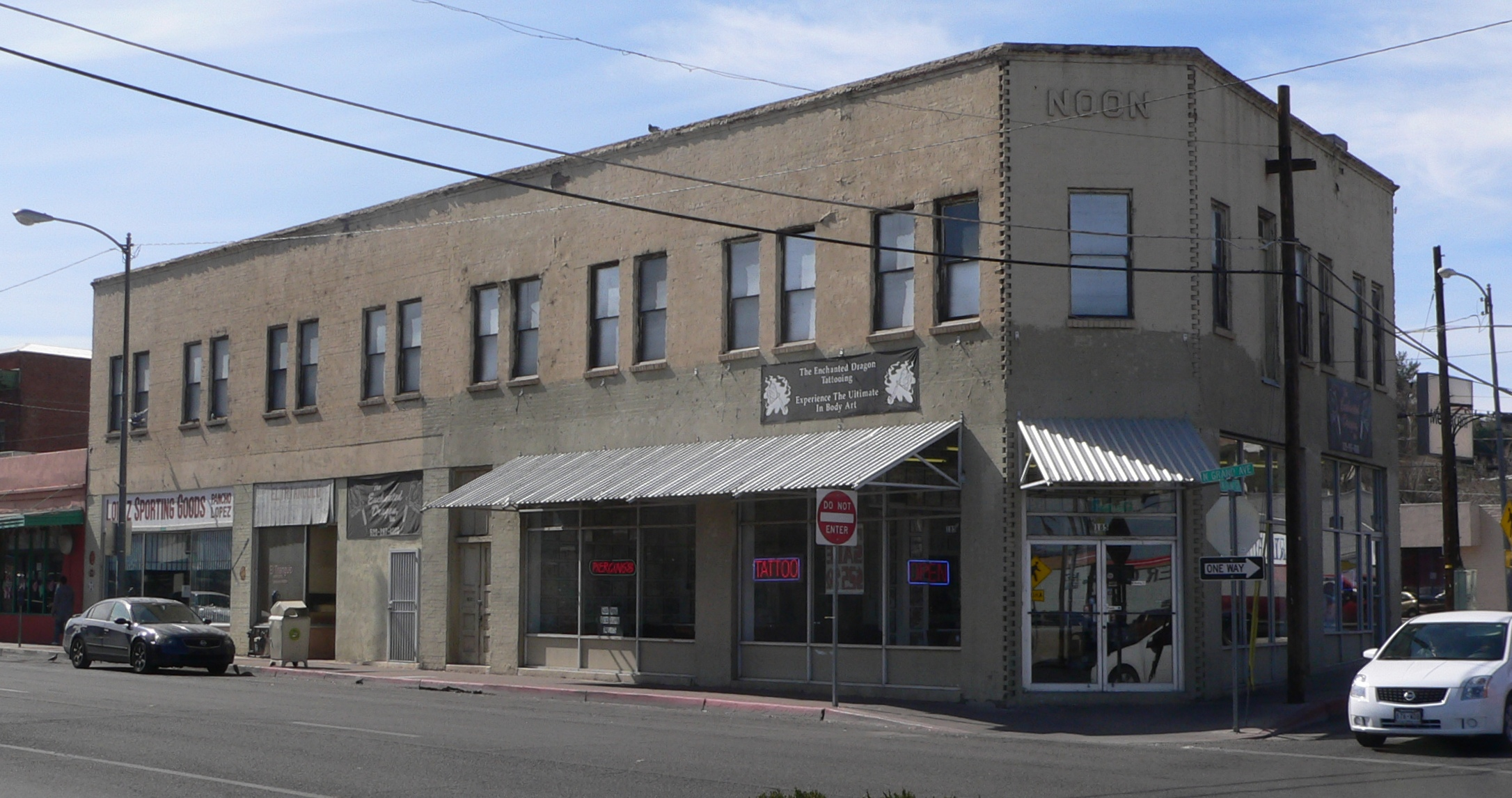
- The building in 2012

- Location within Arizona Location within the United States
- Location: 246 Grande, Nogales, Arizona
- Coordinates: 31°20′10″N 110°56′23″W
- Area: 0 acres (0 ha)
- Built: 1908
- Built by: A.S. Noon
- Architectural style: Chicago, Commercial
- MPS: Nogales MRA
- NRHP reference No.: 85001871
- Added to NRHP: August 29, 1985

The A.S. Noon Building is a historic building in Nogales, Arizona. It was built in 1915 for A. S. Noon, and designed in the Chicago School architectural style. One of the stores was owned by Wing Wong, a Chinese merchant. The building has been listed on the National Register of Historic Places since August 29, 1985.
