= Las Dos Naciones Cigar Factory =

- U.S. National Register of Historic Places
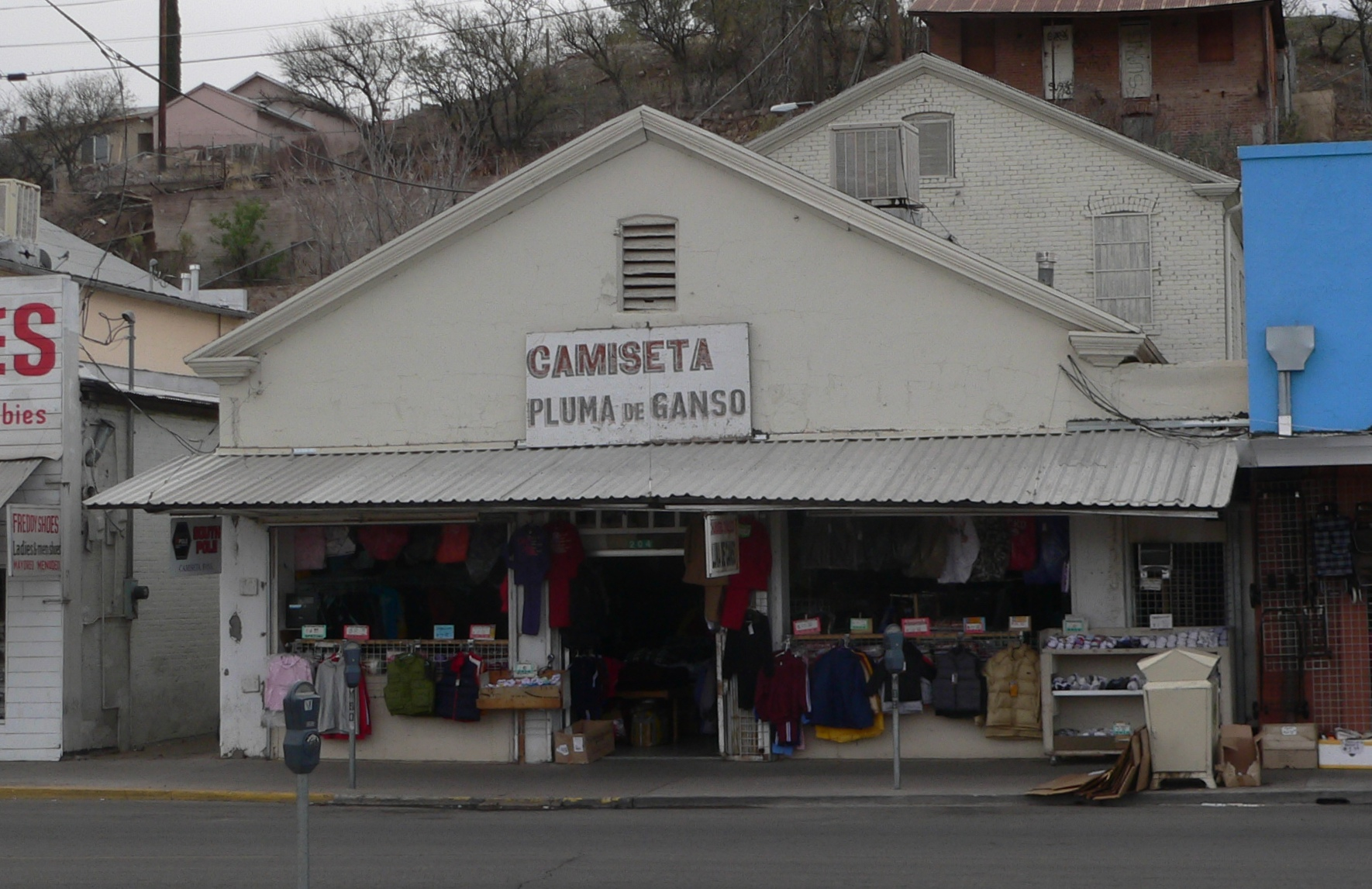
- The building in 2012

- Location within Arizona
- Location: 331 Morley, Nogales, Arizona
- Coordinates: 31°20′08″N 110°56′17″W
- Area: 0 acres (0 ha)
- Built: 1899
- Built by: Maurice Stevens
- Architectural style: Greek Revival, Colonial Revival
- MPS: Nogales MRA
- NRHP reference No.: 85001860
- Added to NRHP: August 29, 1985

Las Dos Naciones Cigar Factory is a historic building in Nogales, Arizona. It was built in 1899 by Maurice Stevens for the Las Dos Naciones Cigar Factory, and designed in the Colonial Revival and Greek Revival architectural styles. The company, co-founded by Bohemian immigrants Richard and Lewis Fleischer in 1897, was the only cigar factory in the Southwestern United States until it closed down in 1917. The building has been listed on the National Register of Historic Places since August 29, 1985.
