= Montezuma Hotel =

- U.S. National Register of Historic Places
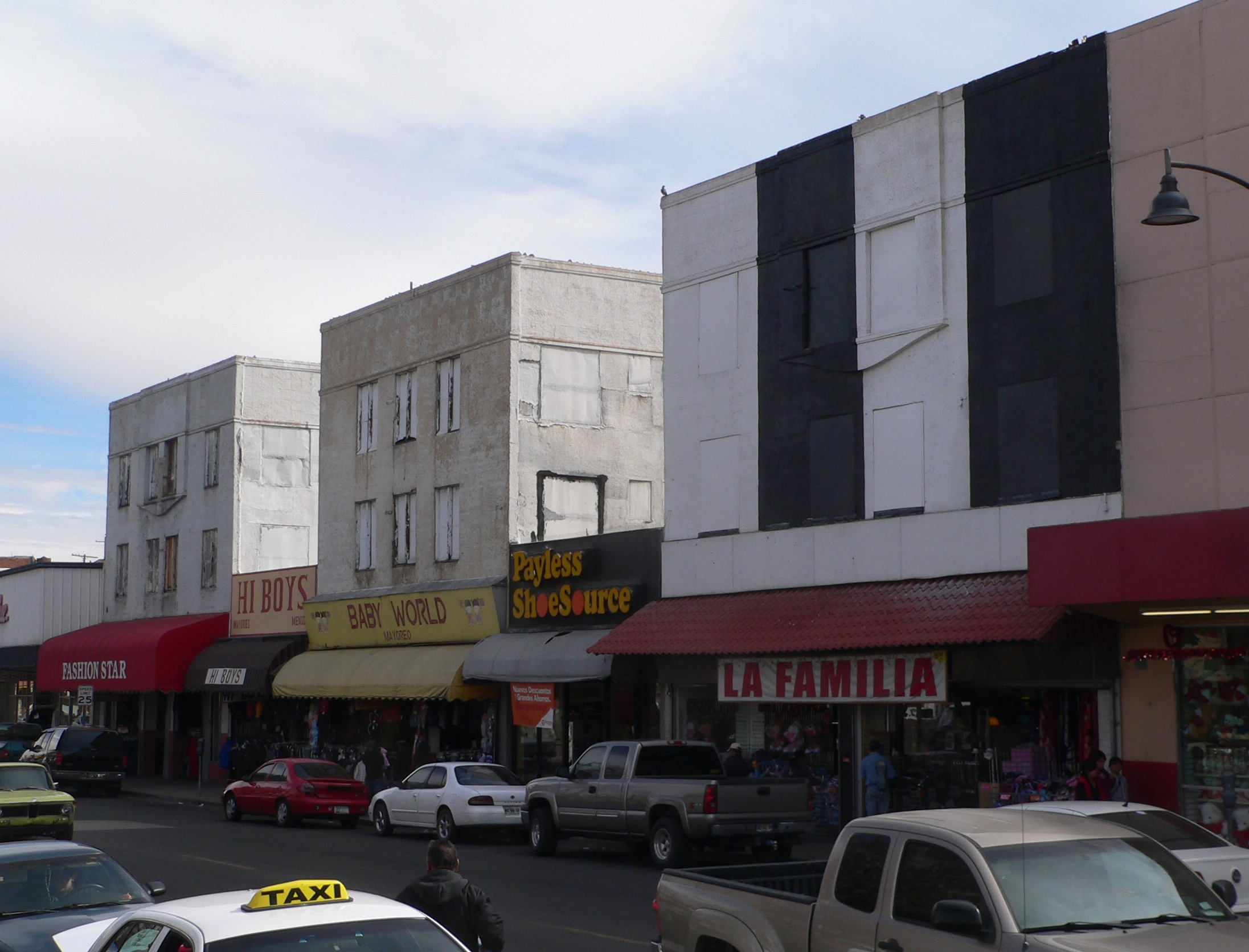
- The building in 2012

- Location within Arizona
- Location: 217 Morley, Nogales, Arizona
- Coordinates: 31°20′02″N 110°56′23″W
- Area: 0 acres (0 ha)
- Built: 1926
- Architectural style: Colonial, Spanish Colonial
- MPS: Nogales MRA
- NRHP reference No.: 85001867
- Added to NRHP: August 29, 1985

The Montezuma Hotel is a historic building in Nogales, Arizona. It was built in 1926, and designed in the Spanish Colonial Revival architectural style. It was built as the largest hotel in Nogales. It has been listed on the National Register of Historic Places since August 26, 1985.
