= George Dunbar House =

- U.S. National Register of Historic Places
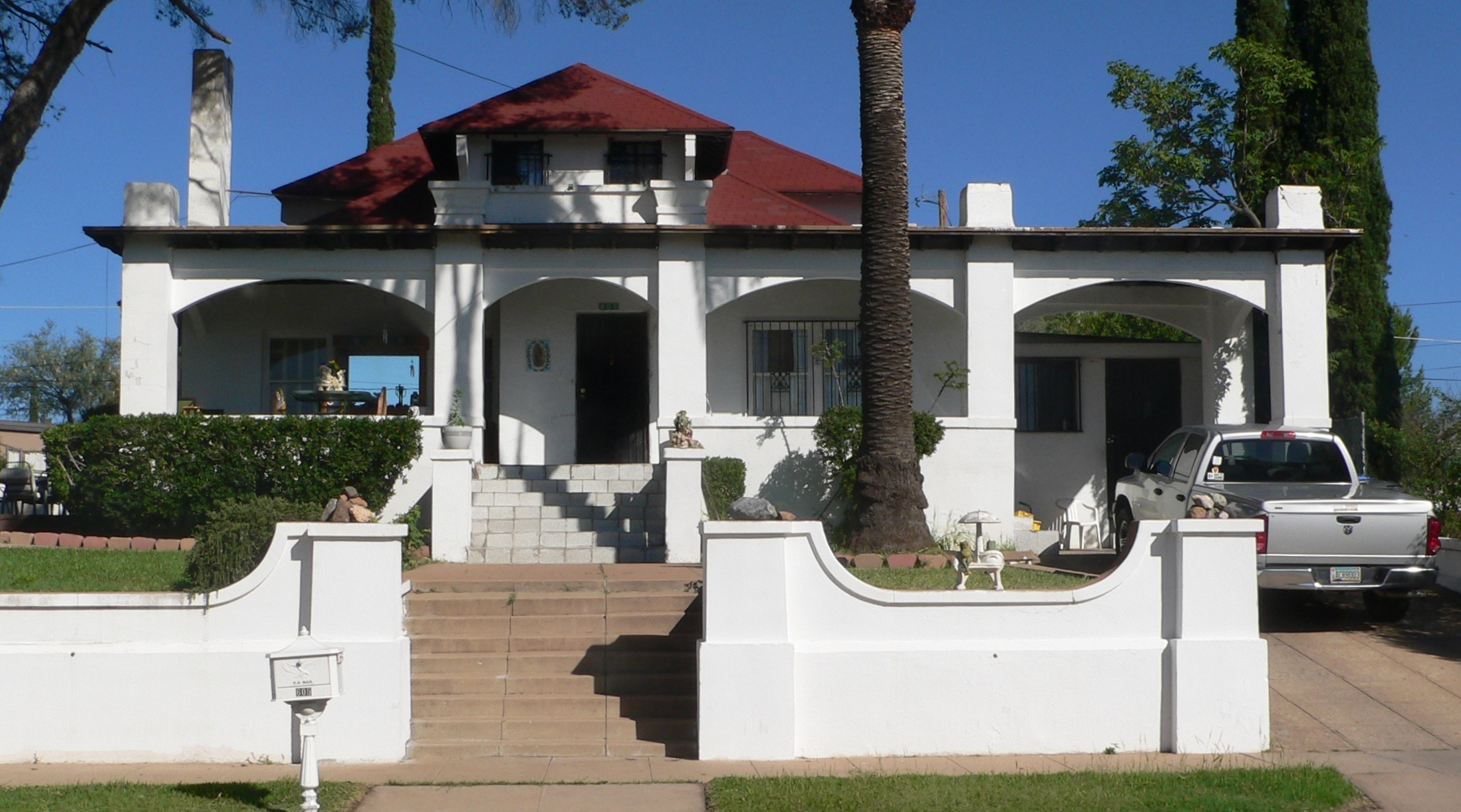
- The house in 2013

- Location within Arizona
- Location: 118 Sierra, Nogales, Arizona
- Coordinates: 31°20′34″N 110°56′10″W
- Area: 0 acres (0 ha)
- Built: 1918
- Architectural style: American Craftsman
- MPS: Nogales MRA
- NRHP reference No.: 85001853
- Added to NRHP: August 29, 1985

The George Dunbar House is a historic house in Nogales, Arizona. It was built in 1918 for George W. Dunbar, a real estate developer who built 75 houses in Nogales, Arizona and a dozen more in Nogales, Sonora across the Mexico–United States border. The house was designed in the American Craftsman architectural style. It has been listed on the National Register of Historic Places since August 29, 1985.
