= James Finley House (Harshaw, Arizona) =

Historic house in Arizona, United States

- U.S. National Register of Historic Places
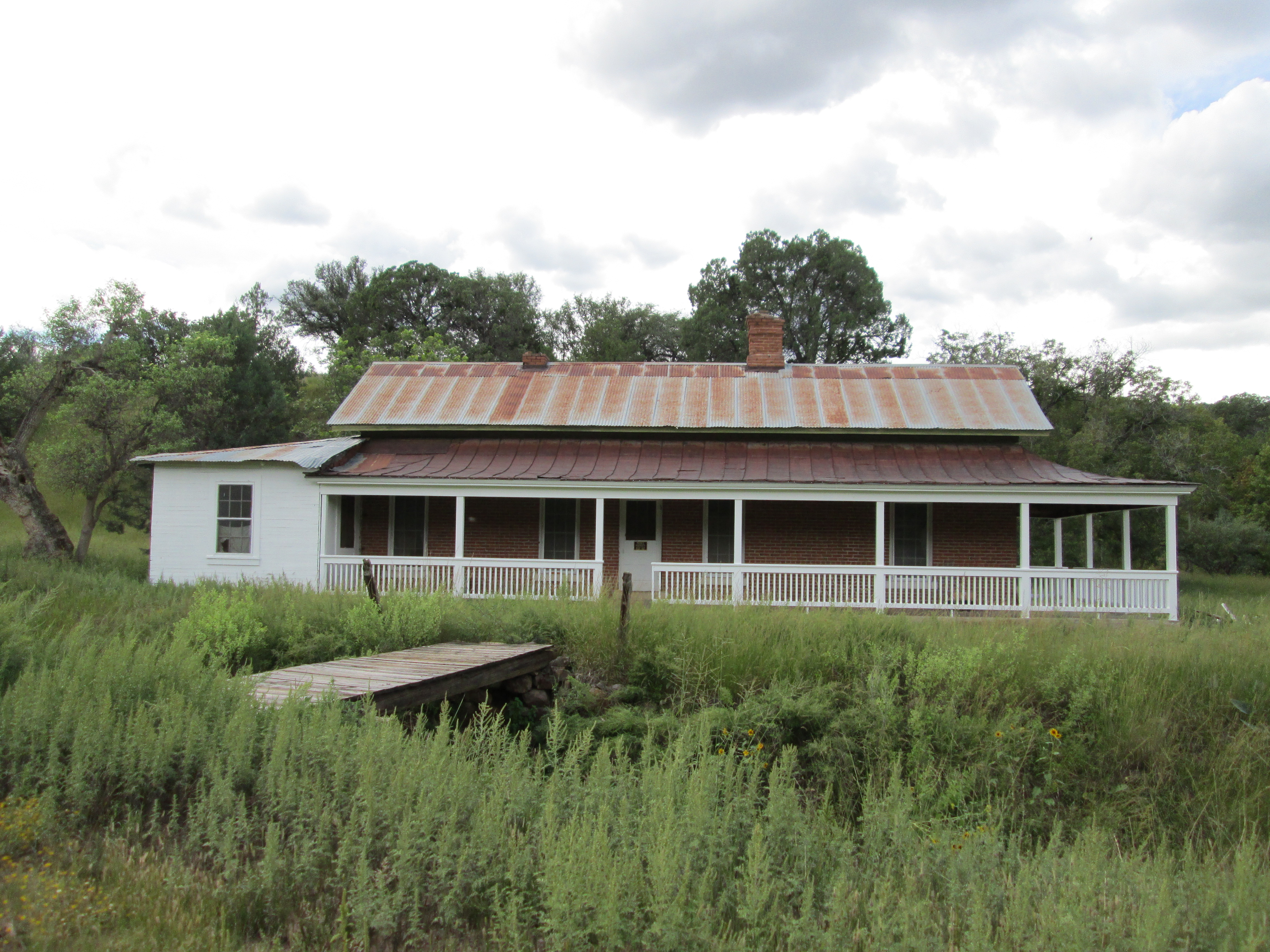
- The James Finley House in 2014.

- Location within Arizona
- Location: Harshaw, Arizona, USA
- Coordinates: 31°27′52.13″N 110°42′19.92″W
- Built: 1877
- NRHP reference No.: 74000462
- Added to NRHP: 1974

The James Finley House is a historic home located on the Hale Ranch in the ghost town of Harshaw, Arizona. Built around 1877, the house was added to the National Register of Historic Places in 1974, and is now the most prominent building remaining in this ghost town. Along with the rest of Harshaw, this house has been within the Coronado National Forest since 1953.

== History ==
The James Finley House was originally a three-room structure built with red bricks salvaged from a large smokestack in the nearby ghost town of Mowry, Arizona. It is about 100 yards from the ruins of the Hermosa Mill, and originally may have been an office for the Hermosa Mining Company. Sometime later, a porch and four adobe additions were added to the building, including a kitchen, two bedrooms, and a bathroom. Each of the three original rooms has a fireplace and windows with stone quarry lintels and sills.

In 1890, the Tucson businessman James Finley bought the old Harshaw Mine, including the house, and built a new mill that was put into operation the same year. Three years later the Hermosa Mining Company leased the Harshaw Mine from Finley and remodeled the mill, but ran out of capital before finding any ore. The demonetization of silver the same year and the building of the railroad through the town of Patagonia, eight miles to the north, spelled the end of Harshaw. Finley died in 1903 and although the mine was later sold, it was not developed any further.

The house was added to the National Register of Historic Places on November 19, 1974, due to its architectural significance and its association with mining in the Harshaw area in the late 19th century. Today, the James Finley House is located on private property directly across the road from the Hale Ranch headquarters in Harshaw, Arizona. It is not open to visitors.

== See also ==
- National Register of Historic Places listings in Santa Cruz County, Arizona
