= Jose Piscorski Building =

- U.S. National Register of Historic Places
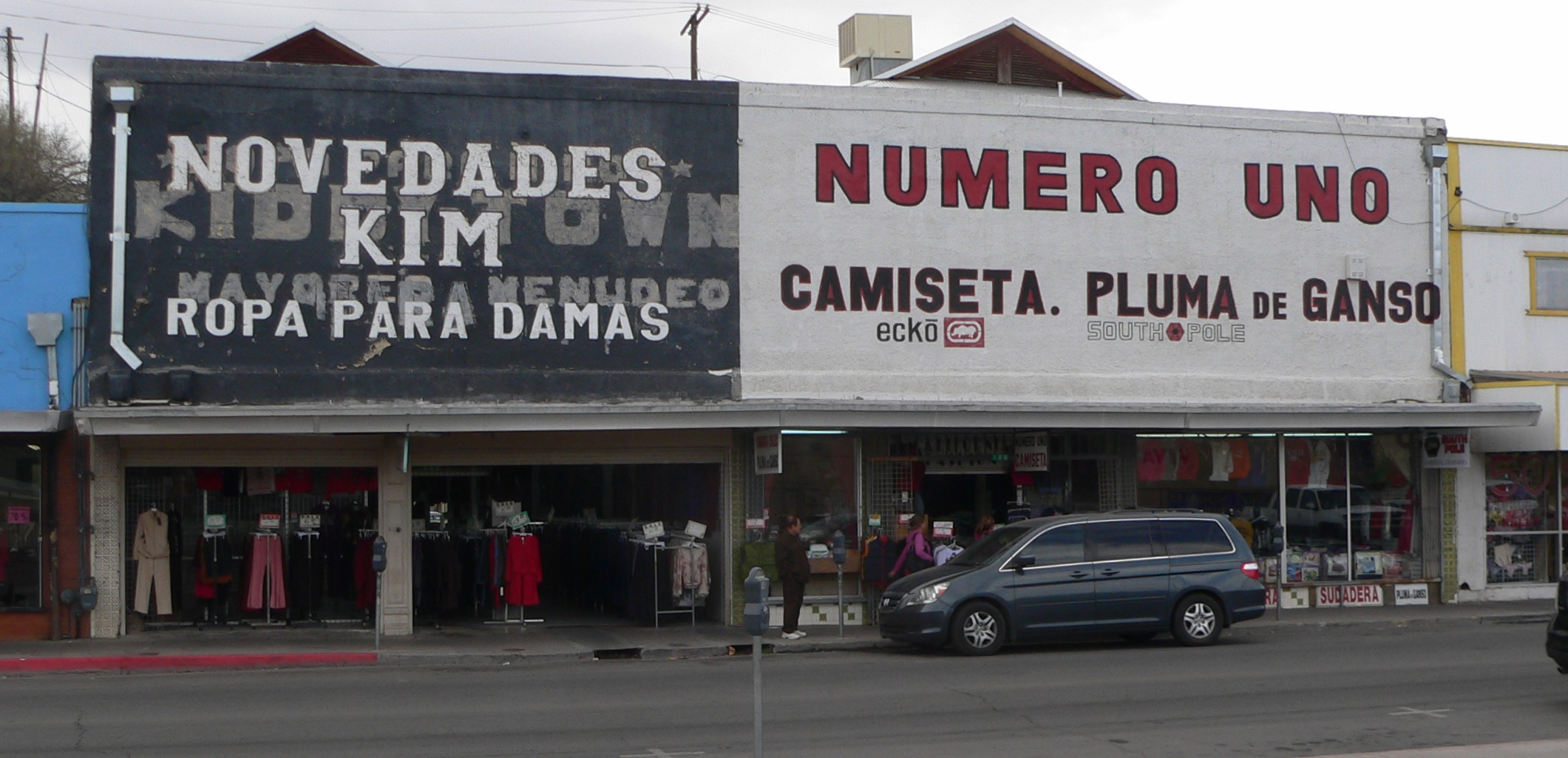
- The building in 2012

- Location within Arizona
- Location: 315 Morley, Nogales, Arizona
- Coordinates: 31°20′07″N 110°56′19″W
- Area: 0 acres (0 ha)
- Built: 1906
- Architectural style: Chicago school
- MPS: Nogales MRA
- NRHP reference No.: 85001870
- Added to NRHP: August 29, 1985

The Jose Piscorski Building is a historic building in Nogales, Arizona. It was built in 1906 by Joseph Piscorski, and designed in the Chicago school architectural style. From 1906 to 1908, the second floor housed the Nogales and Santa Cruz County Board of Trade, and it was later modelled as the San Antonio House Hotel. It has been listed on the National Register of Historic Places since August 29, 1916.
