= Wild Rovers =

1971 film by Blake Edwards

- US release poster
- Directed by: Blake Edwards
- Screenplay by: Blake Edwards
- Produced by: Blake Edwards; Ken Wales
- Starring: William Holden; Ryan O'Neal; Karl Malden; Lynn Carlin; Rachel Roberts
- Cinematography: Philip Lathrop
- Edited by: John F. Burnett
- Music by: Jerry Goldsmith
- Production company: Geoffrey Productions
- Distributed by: Metro-Goldwyn-Mayer
- Release date: June 23, 1971 (United States)
- Running time: 136 minutes (directors cut); 106 minutes (theatrical cut)
- Country: United States
- Language: English

Wild Rovers is a 1971 American Western film directed by Blake Edwards and starring William Holden and Ryan O'Neal.

Originally intended as a three-hour epic, it was heavily edited by Metro-Goldwyn-Mayer without Edwards' knowledge, including a reversal of the ending from a negative one to a positive. Edwards disowned the finished film and later satirized his battle with the studio in his comedy S.O.B., which also starred Holden.

== Plot ==
An aging cowboy, Ross Bodine, and a younger one, Frank Post, work on cattleman Walt Buckman's ranch in Montana. A neighboring sheepman, Hansen, is in a long-running feud with Buckman. Ross has a dream of riding off to Mexico to retire from the hard work of the range, but he does not have much money saved up. Frank suggests they rob a bank and head for Mexico together. While Ross thinks this over, Frank and he brawl with Hansen's men at a saloon. Buckman intends to withhold their pay to make restitution for the saloon's damages.

Desperate for money now, Ross agrees to the holdup. He takes banker Joe Billings to town at gunpoint, while Frank holds the banker's wife, Sada, hostage at home. Ross rides back with $36,000. Before making a getaway, he gives Billings $3,000, so Buckman's other cowboys will not lose any pay they have coming. Sada tells Billings to keep the money and not inform Sheriff Bill Jackson. A posse is formed that includes Buckman's two sons, hot-tempered John and easy-going Paul, told by their father that no cowhand of his is going to get away with breaking the law.

Ross and Frank get as far as Arizona and go into town for supplies. Ross hires a prostitute, while Frank plays poker. A card player dislikes Frank's winning of a huge pot and shoots him in the leg. Ross comes to his partner's aid and a shootout commences, leaving several people dead. Back home, Buckman and Hansen have a run-in that results in both their deaths. John and Paul hear about their father's fate from a Tucson sheriff. Paul wants to turn back, but John becomes obsessed with fulfilling the old man's last request, catching the bank robbers.

Frank refuses to see a doctor, and his leg injury grows much worse. Ross has to pull him behind a horse on a stretcher. Frank dies from the wound just before John and Paul turn up on the trail, where Ross is gunned down. Disgusted with the entire affair and sorry he had to shoot Ross, Paul rides off, leaving John alone struggling to return Ross' dead body to the scene of his crime. The movie ends with a flashback of Ross riding a bucking bronco, while Frank cheers him on.

== Cast ==
- William Holden as Ross Bodine
- Ryan O'Neal as Frank Post
- Karl Malden as Walt Buckman
- Joe Don Baker as Paul Buckman
- Tom Skerritt as John Buckman
- James Olson as Joe Billings
- Lynn Carlin as Sada Billings
- Leora Dana as Nell Buckman
- Victor French as Sheriff Bill Jackson
- Rachel Roberts as Maybell Tucker
- Moses Gunn as Ben
- Sam Gilman as Hansen
- Charles Gray as Savage
- Bill Bryant as Hereford
- Jack Garner as Cap Swilling
- William Lucking as Ruff
- Ed Bakey as Gambler
- Ted Gehring as Tucson Sheriff
- Alan Carney as Palace Bartender

== Production ==
The film was made for Metro-Goldwyn-Mayer through Blake Edwards' own company Geoffrey Productions. William Holden and Ryan O'Neal agreed to play the leads and filming began in late 1970. It was O'Neal's first movie since Love Story.

Parts of the film were shot at Monument Valley, Professor Valley, and Arches in Utah, as well as Old Tucson and Sedona in Arizona.

During postproduction, MGM management – in particular James T. Aubrey and Douglas Netter – cut 40 minutes from the film, without Edwards' knowledge or consent. "There was no discussion; an integral part was simply removed", said Edwards. "If I take a chair and removed one leg, you still have a chair, but it won't stand up, will it?" "He cut the heart right out of it", Edwards said of Aubrey. "I wrote and conceived it as a Greek tragedy. Aubrey and Netter just said 'the audience wants to see Ryan O'Neal.'" Netter said the changes were made after disappointing previews. Shortly after filming finished, O'Neal and Holden were announced to be reuniting on Top of the Mountain based on a script by Peter Viertel about hunting in Kenya. The film was never made.

== Reception ==
The film performed disappointingly at the box office on its initial release.

The advertising campaign was blamed, with some saying the poster of O'Neal hugging Holden from behind was unintentionally hilarious. Variety published an article mocking the campaign causing a dispute between MGM management and Variety. The ad campaign was later changed.

On review aggregator Rotten Tomatoes, the film has an approval rating of 60% based on 15 reviews.

== Home media ==
Most of the deleted footage discussed above was restored for the film's 1986 MGM Home Video release. An official DVD-R release was issued on February 22, 2011, through the Warner Archive Collection.

== See also ==
- List of American films of 1971
- Hale Ranch
