= Hale Ranch =

Cattle ranch in Santa Cruz County, Arizona

Coordinates: 31°28′N 110°42′W

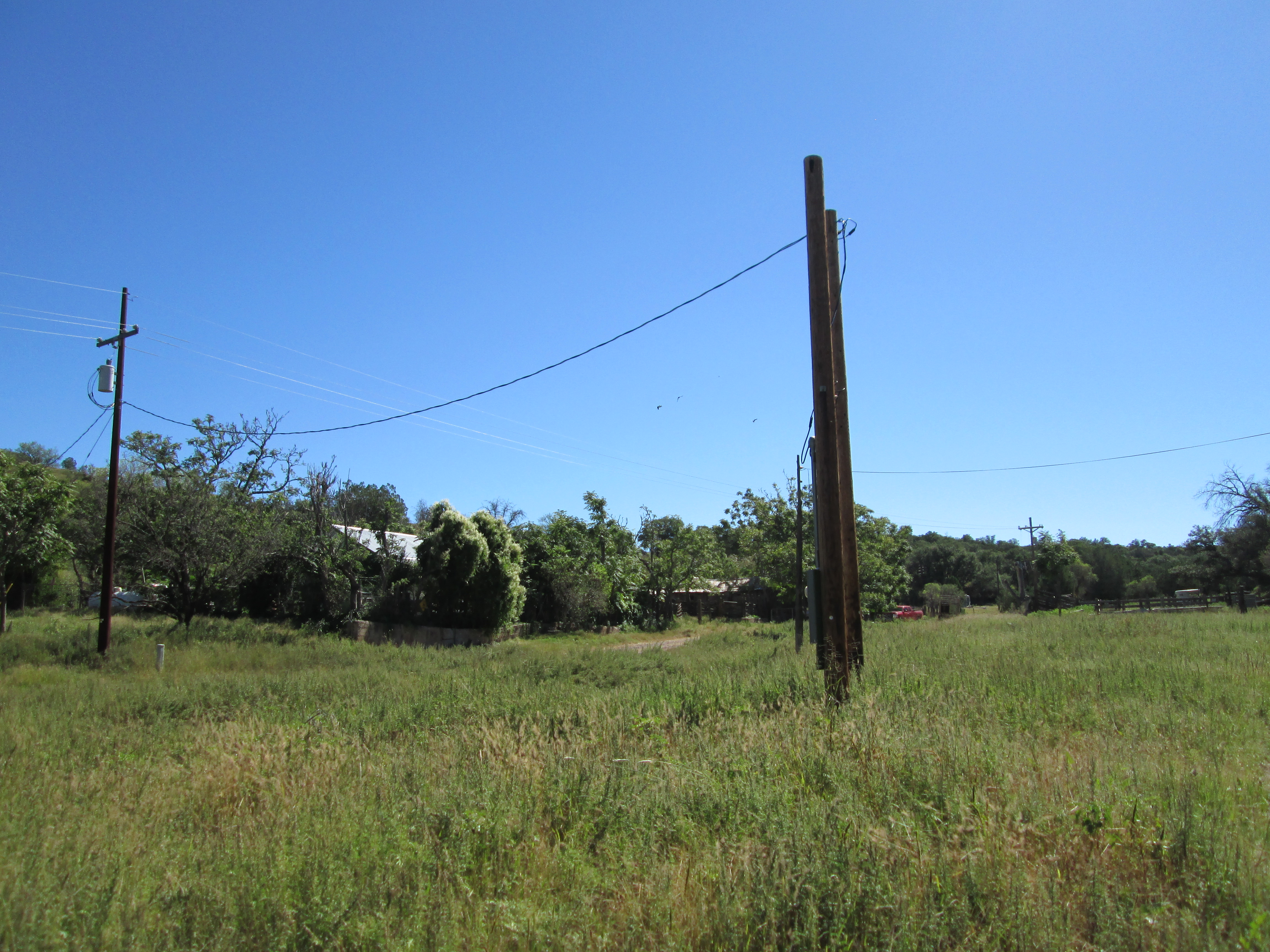
- The Hale Ranch headquarters in the ghost town of Harshaw, Arizona
- Industry: Cattle ranching
- Founded: 1915
- Founder: Richard Farrell
- Headquarters: Harshaw, Arizona, United States

The Hale Ranch is a working cattle ranch headquartered in the ghost town of Harshaw, in the Patagonia Mountains of southeastern Arizona.

== History ==
Hale Ranch was founded in 1915 by farmer and homesteader Richard Farrell, and was originally known as Dickey's Place. It later passed into the ownership of Farrell's grandson, Norman Hale, and has been used as a cattle ranch ever since. The headquarters is located in Harshaw and includes multiple historic buildings, associated outbuildings, and building foundations.

The most prominent of these is the James Finley House, a red brick and adobe structure originally used as the office for the Hermosa Mining Company. Because of its unusual construction—red bricks salvaged from a nearby mine—and its association with the early history of Harshaw, the James Finley House was added to the National Register of Historic Places in 1974.

Another historic home located on the ranch is the Norman Hale Residence, an adobe house with a tin gabled roof, part of which dates back to the 1880s. Nearby is the Mary Hale Residence, another adobe house with a tin hipped roof, built around the same time as the others and locally referred to as the "Lions Den". Further down the road is the ruin of a third adobe building that was originally owned by Ignacio "Nacho" Arias, who used it as his home and a pool hall.

In addition to the old houses and outbuildings, there are the foundations of several historic structures. The most notable is that of the Hermosa Mill, which was originally built in the 1870s when mining operations began. Closer to the James Finley House is the concrete foundations of a two-room frame schoolhouse and a Catholic church built of volcanic tuff, both of which were built in the 1940s and torn down in the 1960s. A smaller rock alignment nearby was part of an assay office from the late 19th century.

Two small cemeteries are also located in the area. The main cemetery to the north of the Hale Ranch headquarters and the townsite is known locally as the "Mexican cemetery", because of the many Mexican-American pioneers buried in the cemetery. A short distance away is the "American cemetery", which is located on private property and contains the graves of American pioneers, among them Richard Farrell.

A few miles to the east of the Hale Ranch headquarters is another historic ranch house owned by the Hale family. Located along the San Rafael Valley road, the home was originally the headquarters for the Ernest Best Ranch, and was used as a filming location for several Western films. The opening scene of the 1971 film "Wild Rovers", starring William Holden and Ryan O'Neal, was shot in the living room of the ranch house.

== Photo gallery ==
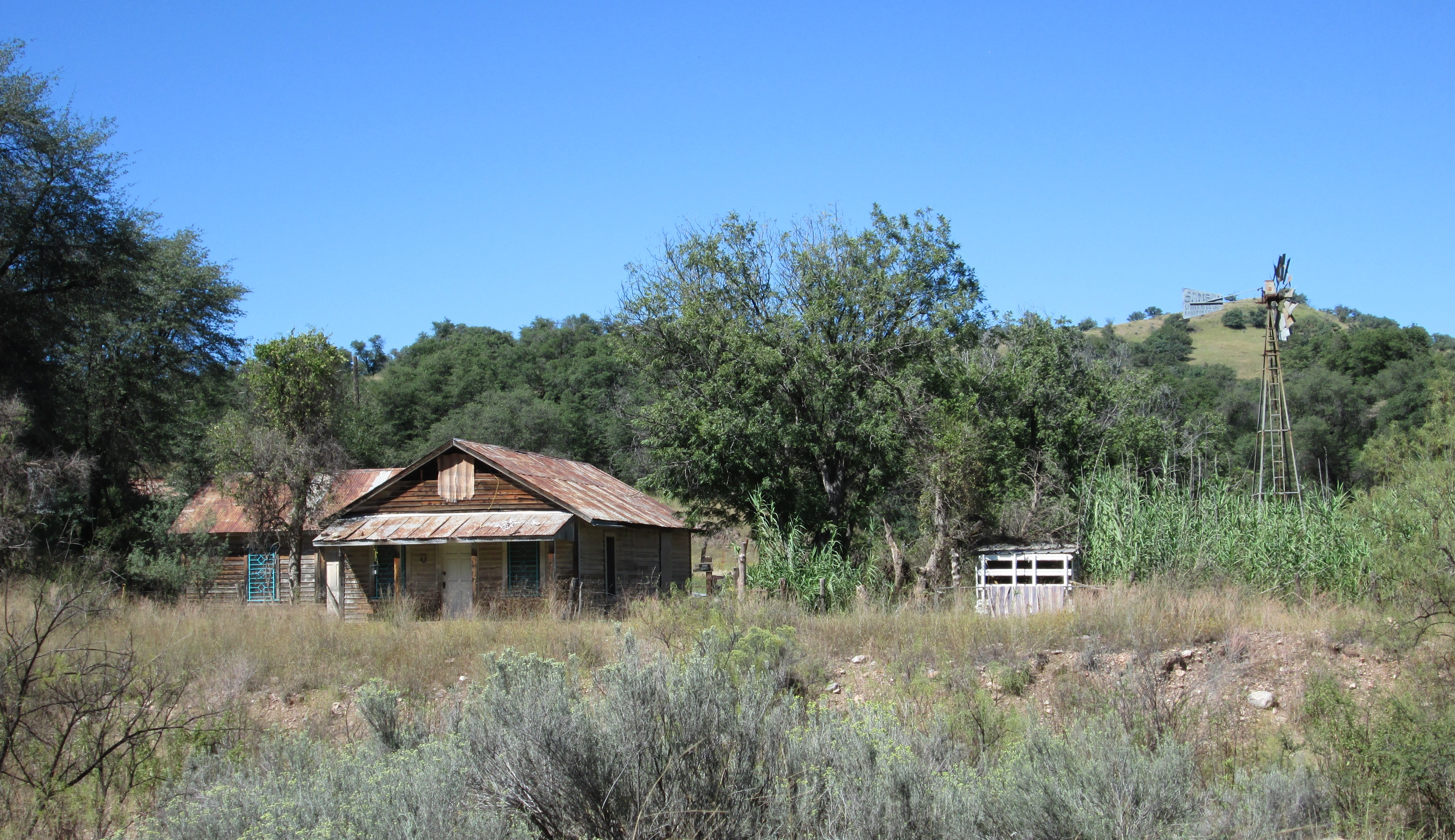
The Hale Ranch House on the road to San Rafael Valley.

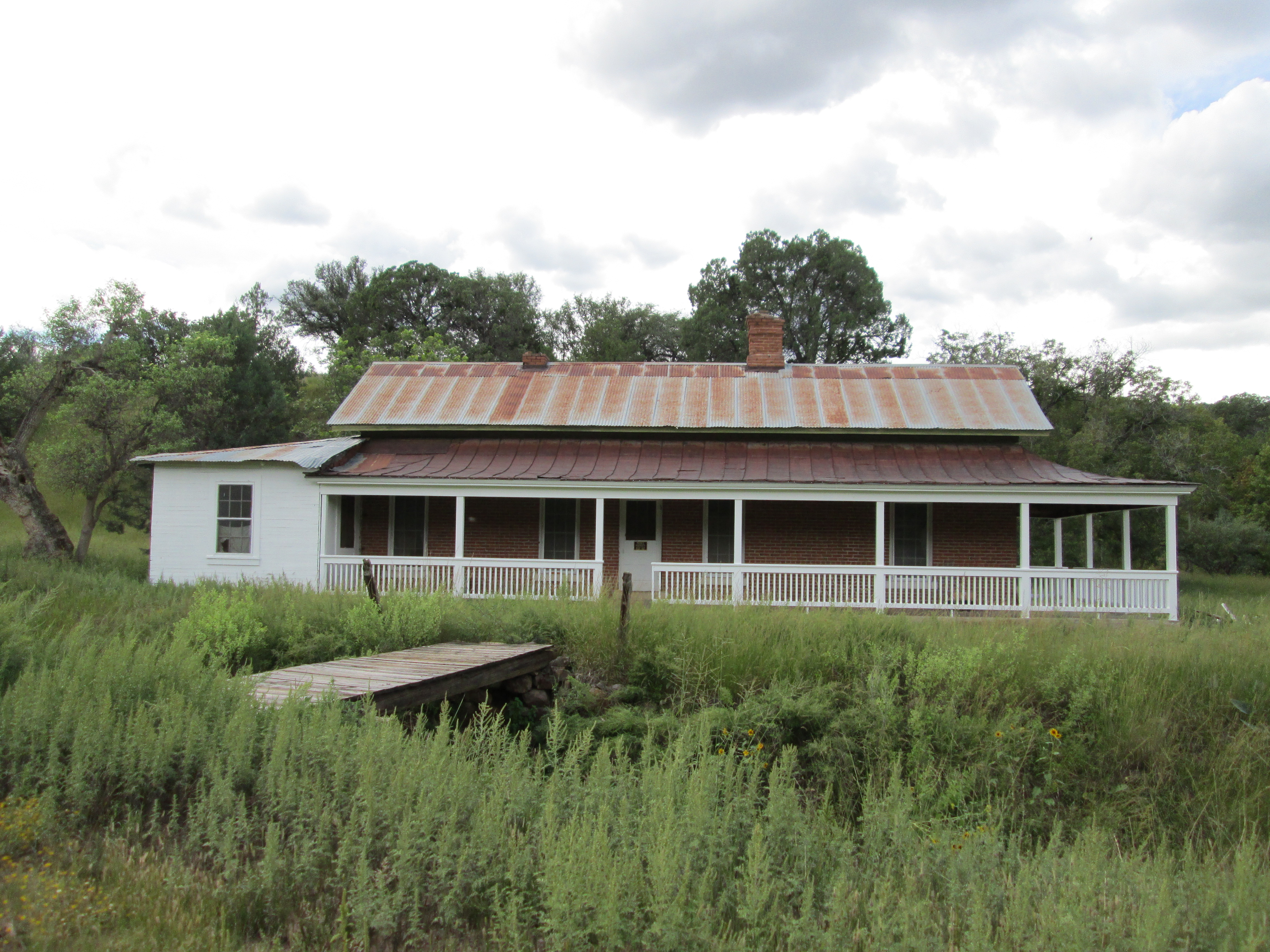
The James Finley House

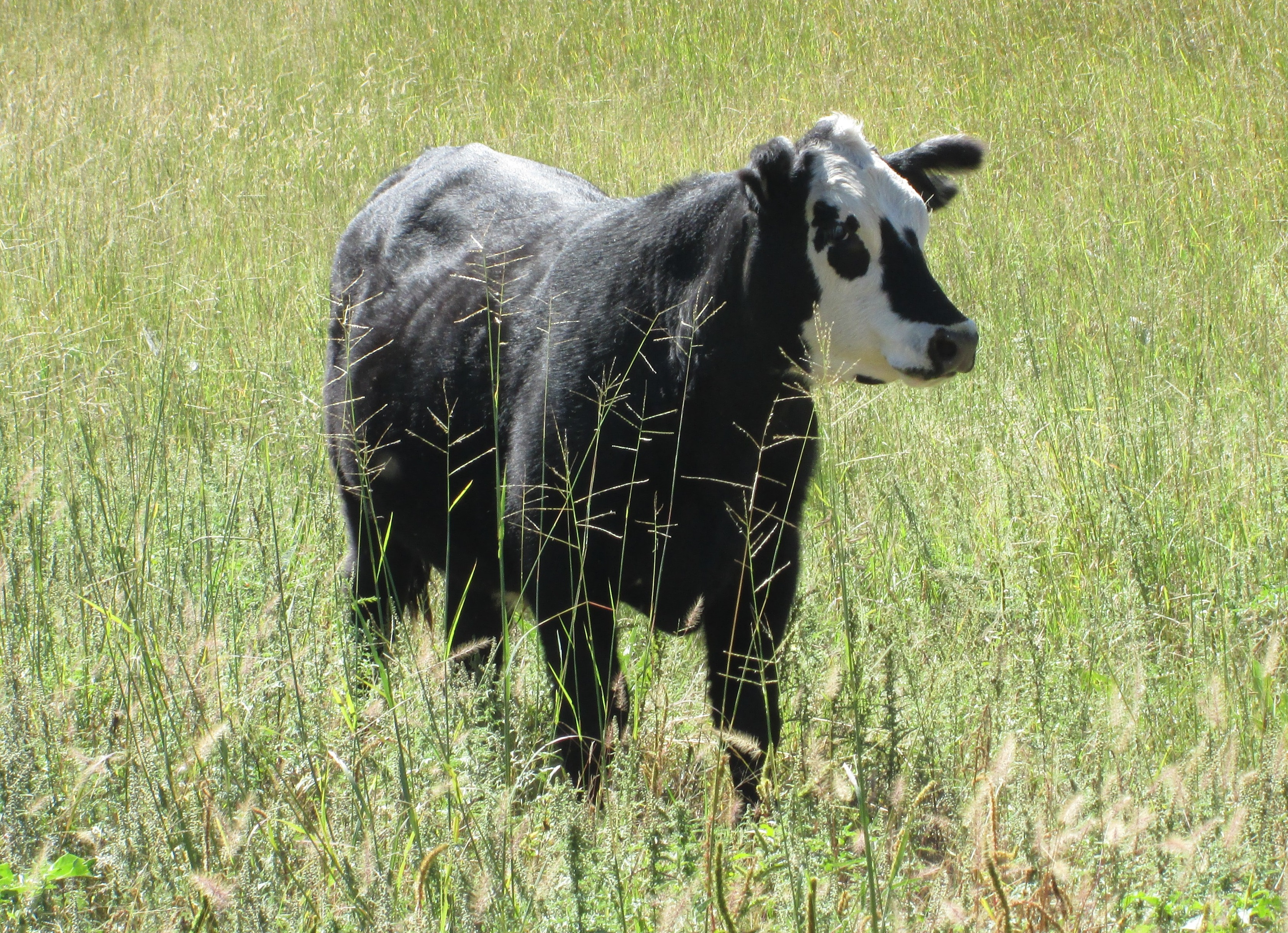
A cow on the Hale Ranch, near the James Finley House.

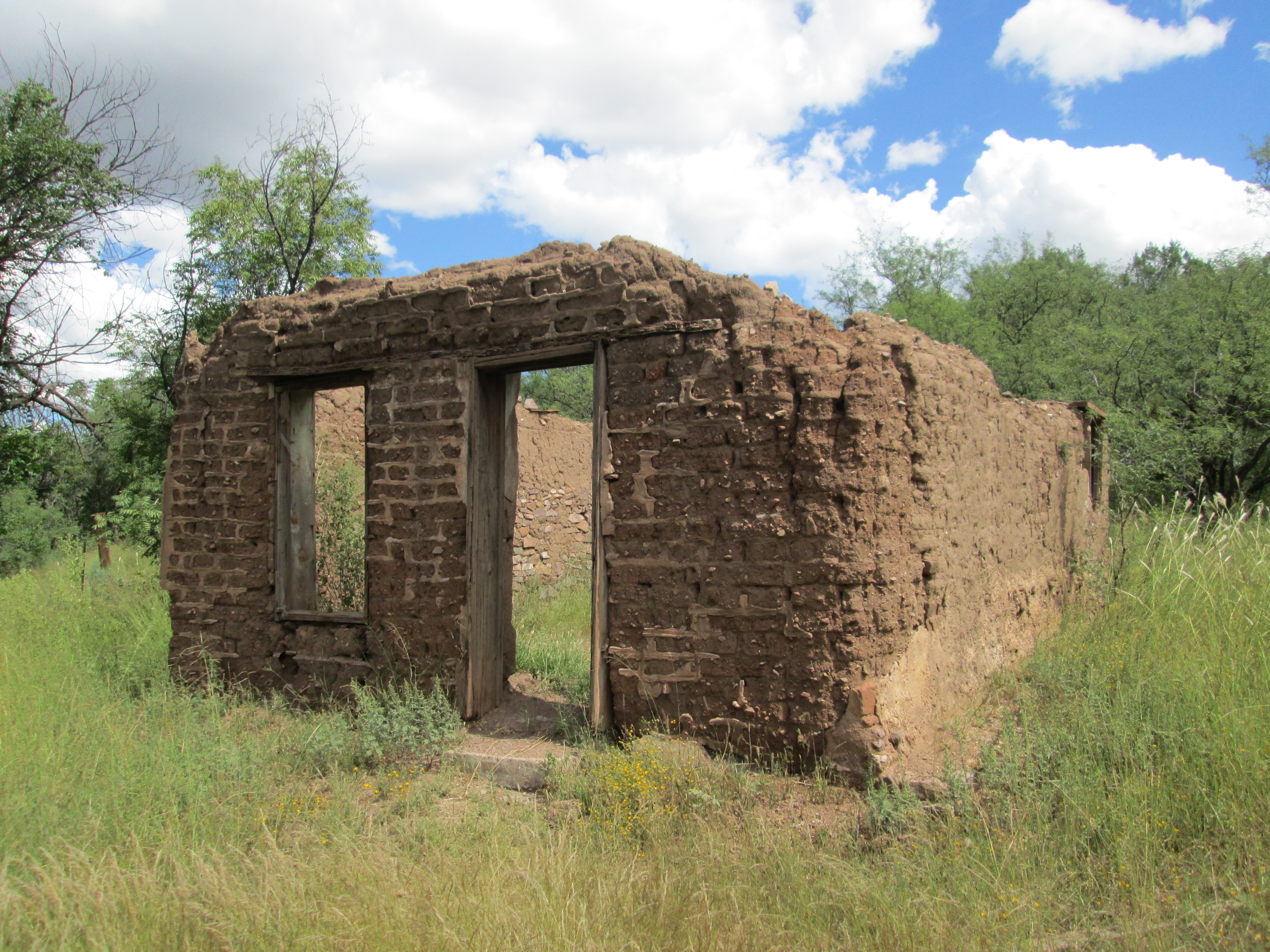
The ruin of an adobe house and pool hall at the edge of the Hale Ranch property.

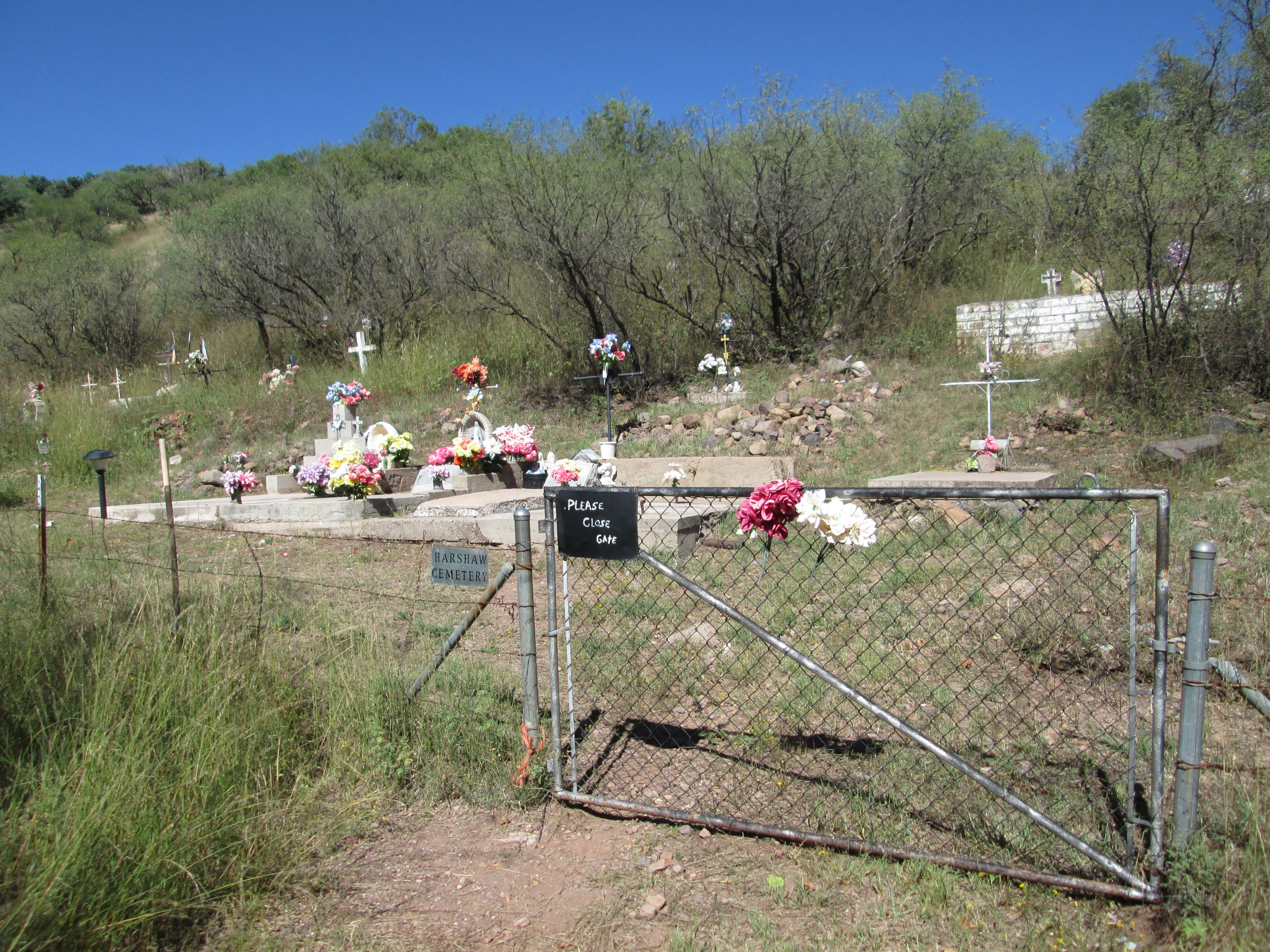
The Harshaw Cemetery, near the adobe ruin.

== See also ==
- San Rafael Ranch
