= Burton Building =

- U.S. National Register of Historic Places
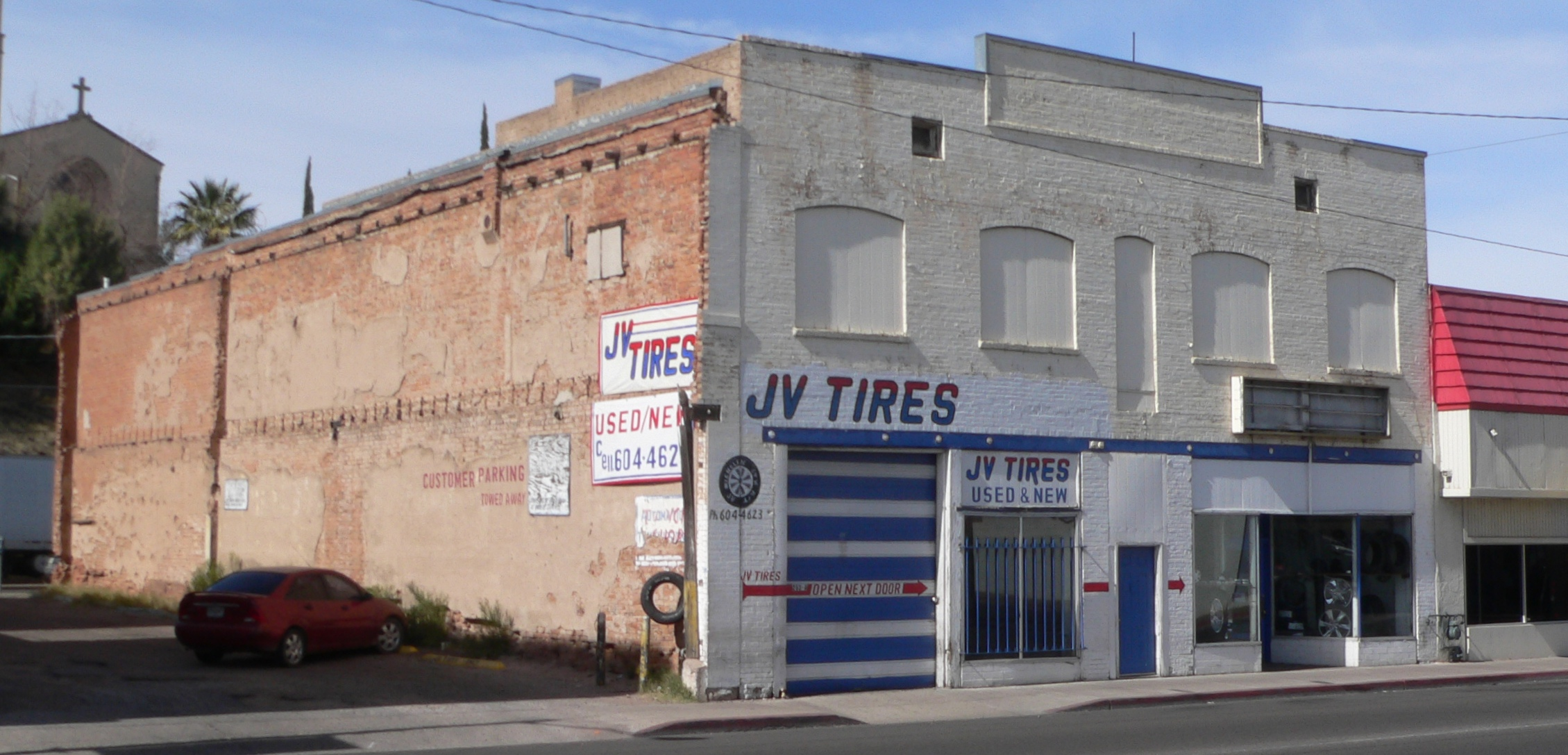
- The building in 2012

- Location within Arizona Location within the United States
- Location: 322--324 Grande, Nogales, Arizona
- Coordinates: 31°20′14″N 110°56′21″W
- Area: 0 acres (0 ha)
- Built: 1916
- Built by: Edware Burton
- Architectural style: Chicago school
- MPS: Nogales MRA
- NRHP reference No.: 85001848
- Added to NRHP: August 29, 1985

The Burton Building is a historic building in Nogales, Arizona. It was built by Edward Burton as a hotel in 1916, and designed in the Chicago school architectural style. It has been listed on the National Register of Historic Places since August 29, 1985.
