= Arizona-Sonora Manufacturing Company Machine Shop =

- U.S. National Register of Historic Places
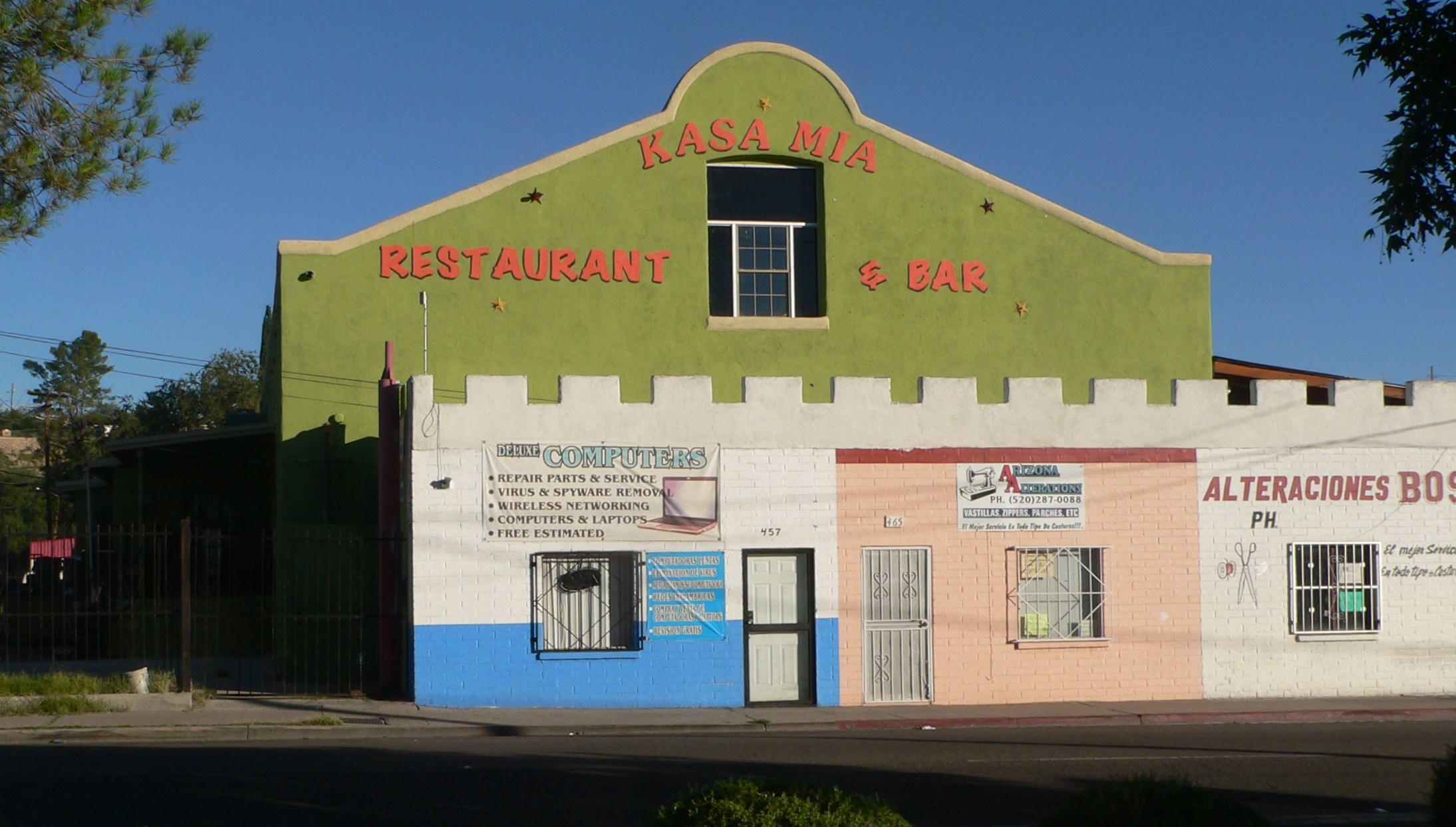
- The building in 2013

- Location within Arizona
- Location: Grand Avenue at Arroyo Boulevard, Nogales, Arizona
- Coordinates: 31°20′23″N 110°56′14″W
- Area: 0 acres (0 ha)
- Built: 1901
- Architectural style: Mission/spanish Revival
- MPS: Nogales MRA
- NRHP reference No.: 85001851
- Added to NRHP: August 29, 1985

The Arizona-Sonora Manufacturing Company Machine Shop is a historic building in Nogales, Arizona. The former machine shop was erected in 1901, and designed in the Mission Revival architectural style. The company was the largest employer in Nogales from 1900 to 1920. The building has been listed on the National Register of Historic Places since August 29, 1985.
