= W.G. Bowman House =

United States historic place in Nogales, Arizona

- W. G. Bowman House
- U.S. National Register of Historic Places
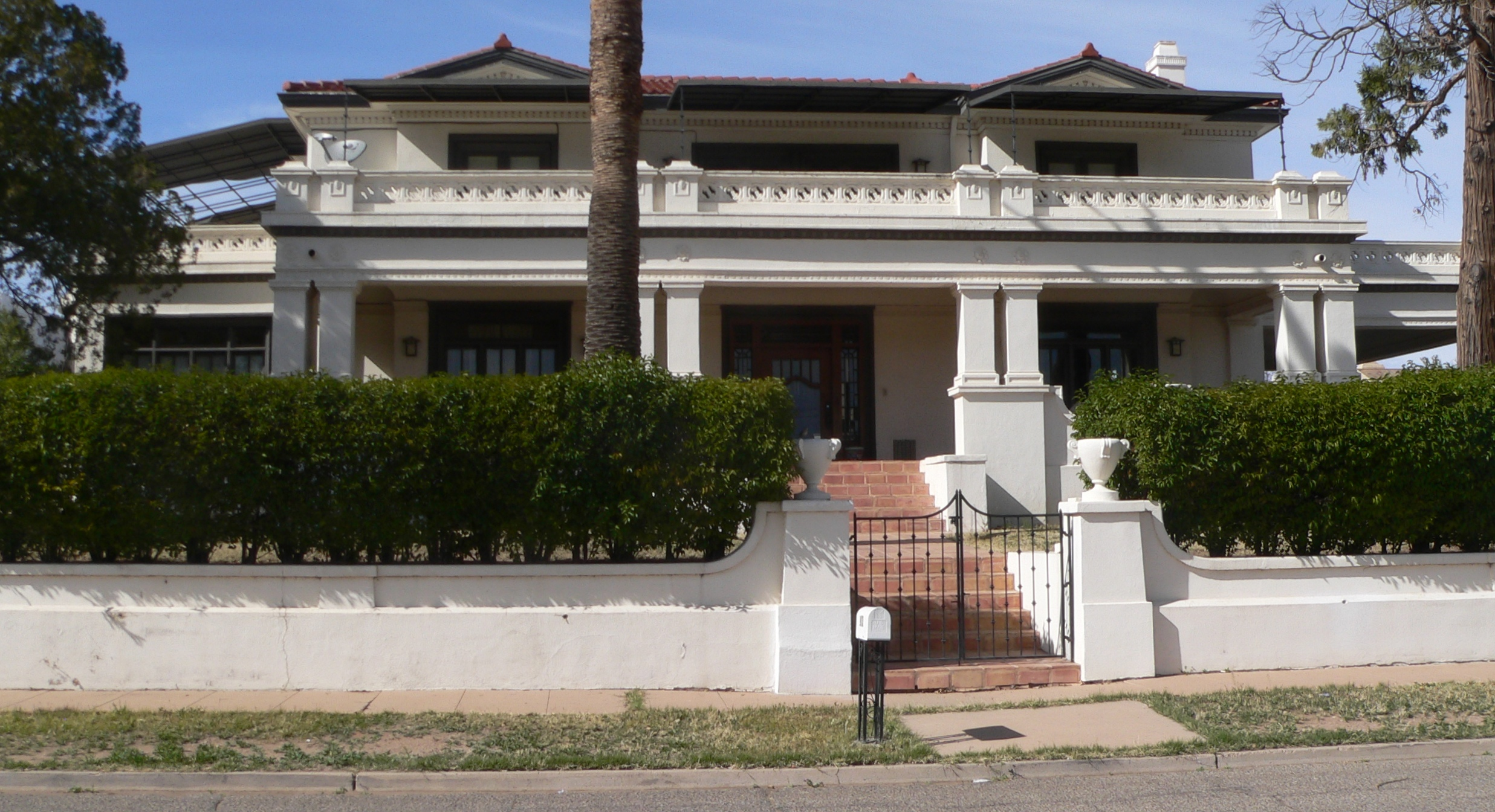
- The house in 2012

- Location within Arizona
- Location: 112 Sierra, Nogales, Arizona
- Coordinates: 31°20′33″N 110°56′11″W
- Area: 0 acres (0 ha)
- Built: 1918
- Architectural style: Classical Revival
- MPS: Nogales MRA
- NRHP reference No.: 85001850
- Added to NRHP: August 29, 1985

The W.G. Bowman House is a historic house in Nogales, Arizona. It was built in 1918 for Wirt Bowman, a businessman who served as the mayor of Nogales from 1918 to 1919 and as a member of the Arizona House of Representatives from 1919 to 1920. It was designed in the Classical Revival architectural style. It has been listed on the National Register of Historic Places since August 29, 1985.
