= Hotel Blanca =

United States historic place in Nogales, Arizona

- U.S. National Register of Historic Places
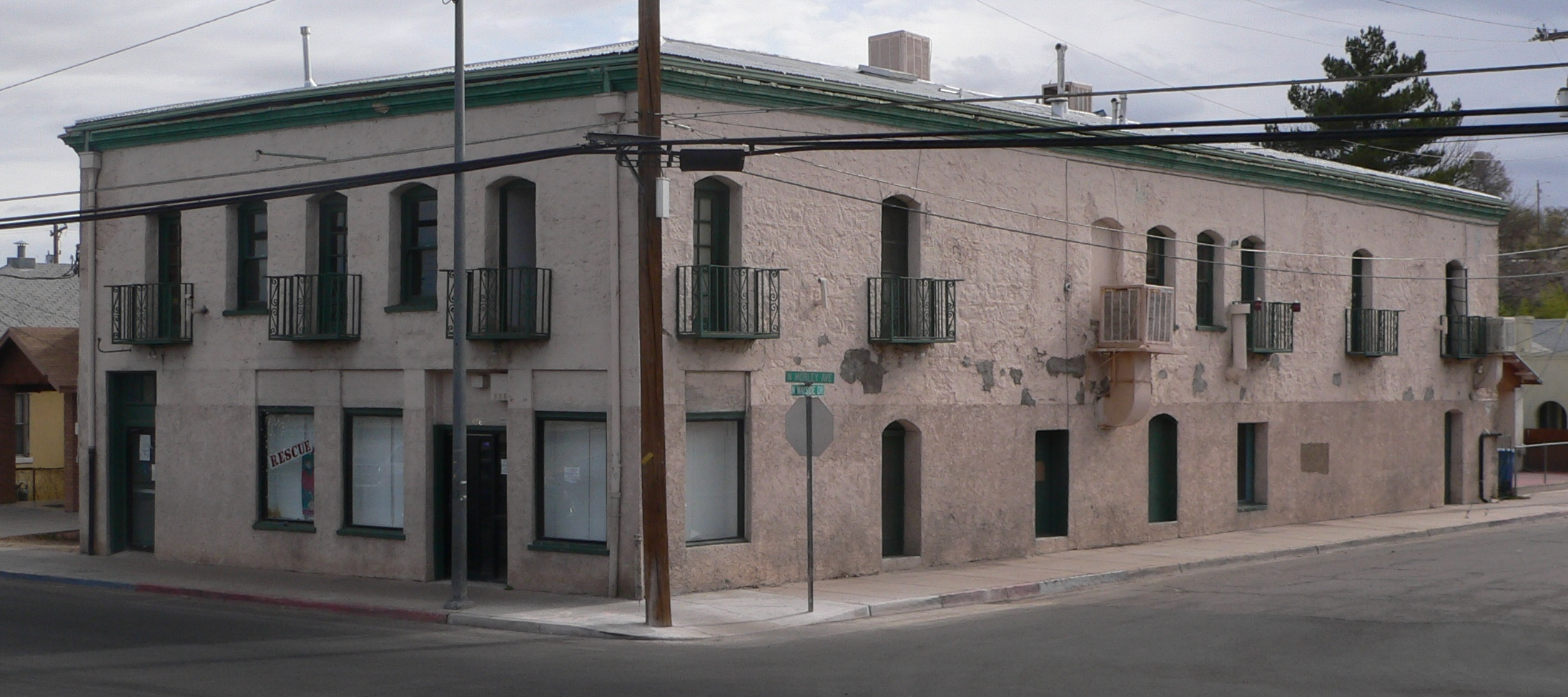
- The hotel in 2012

- Location within Arizona
- Location: 701 Morley, Nogales, Arizona
- Coordinates: 31°20′25″N 110°56′01″W
- Area: 0 acres (0 ha)
- Built: 1917
- MPS: Nogales MRA
- NRHP reference No.: 85001861
- Added to NRHP: August 29, 1985

Hotel Blanca is a historic hotel building in Nogales, Arizona. It was built in 1917 for Leonardo Gomez, and it served as a storeroom and hotel. It has been listed on the National Register of Historic Places since August 29, 1985.
