= Frank F. Cranz House =

- U.S. National Register of Historic Places
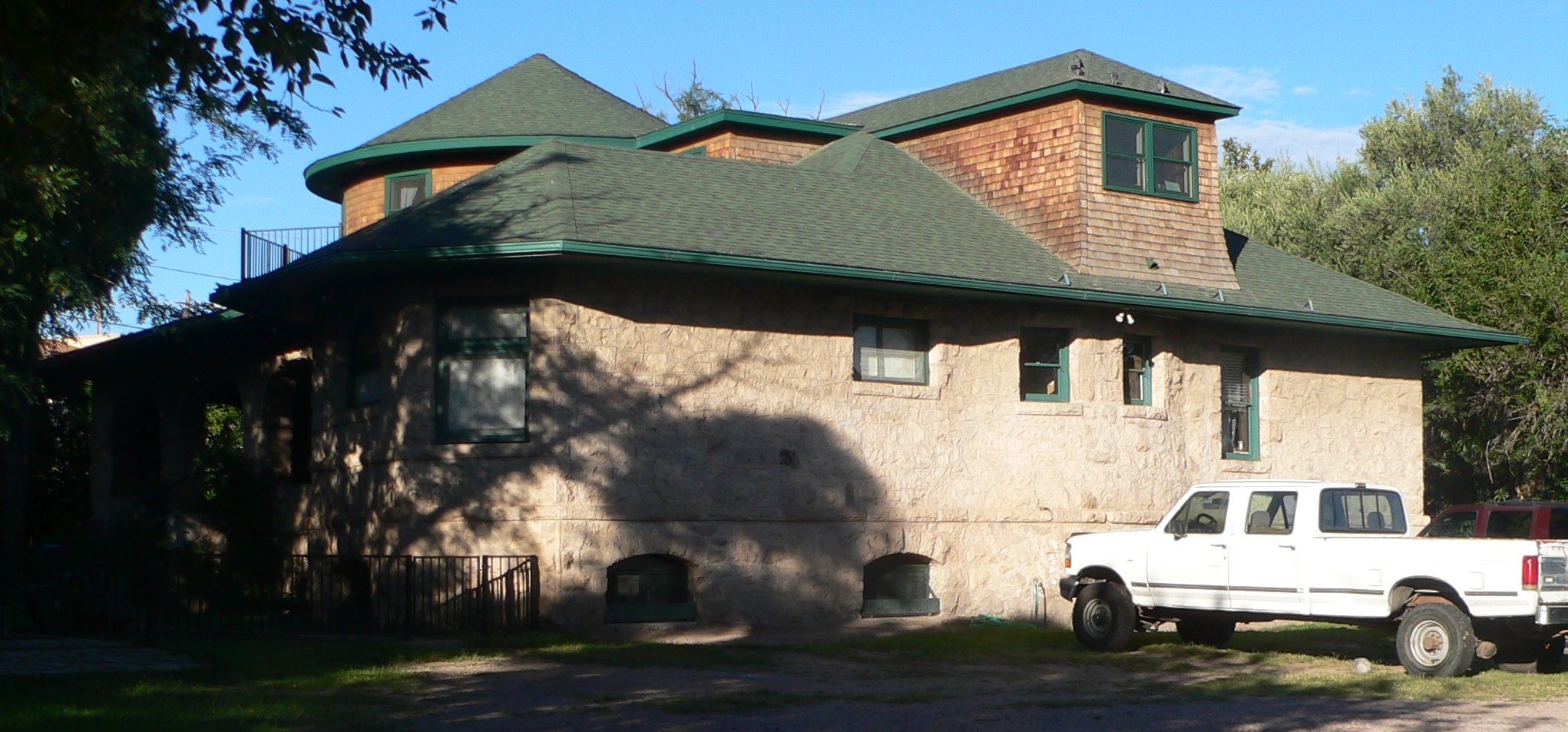
- The house in 2013

- Location within Arizona
- Location: 408 Arroyo, Nogales, Arizona
- Coordinates: 31°20′19″N 110°56′24″W
- Area: 0 acres (0 ha)
- Architectural style: Queen Anne
- MPS: Nogales MRA
- NRHP reference No.: 85001849
- Added to NRHP: August 29, 1985

The Frank F. Cranz House is a historic house in Nogales, Arizona. It was built in 1901–1907 for Franklin F. Cranz, who served as the mayor of Nogales from 1904 to 1906. It was designed in the Queen Anne architectural style. It has been listed on the National Register of Historic Places since August 29, 1985.
