= J.E. Wise Building =

- J. E. Wise Building
- U.S. National Register of Historic Places
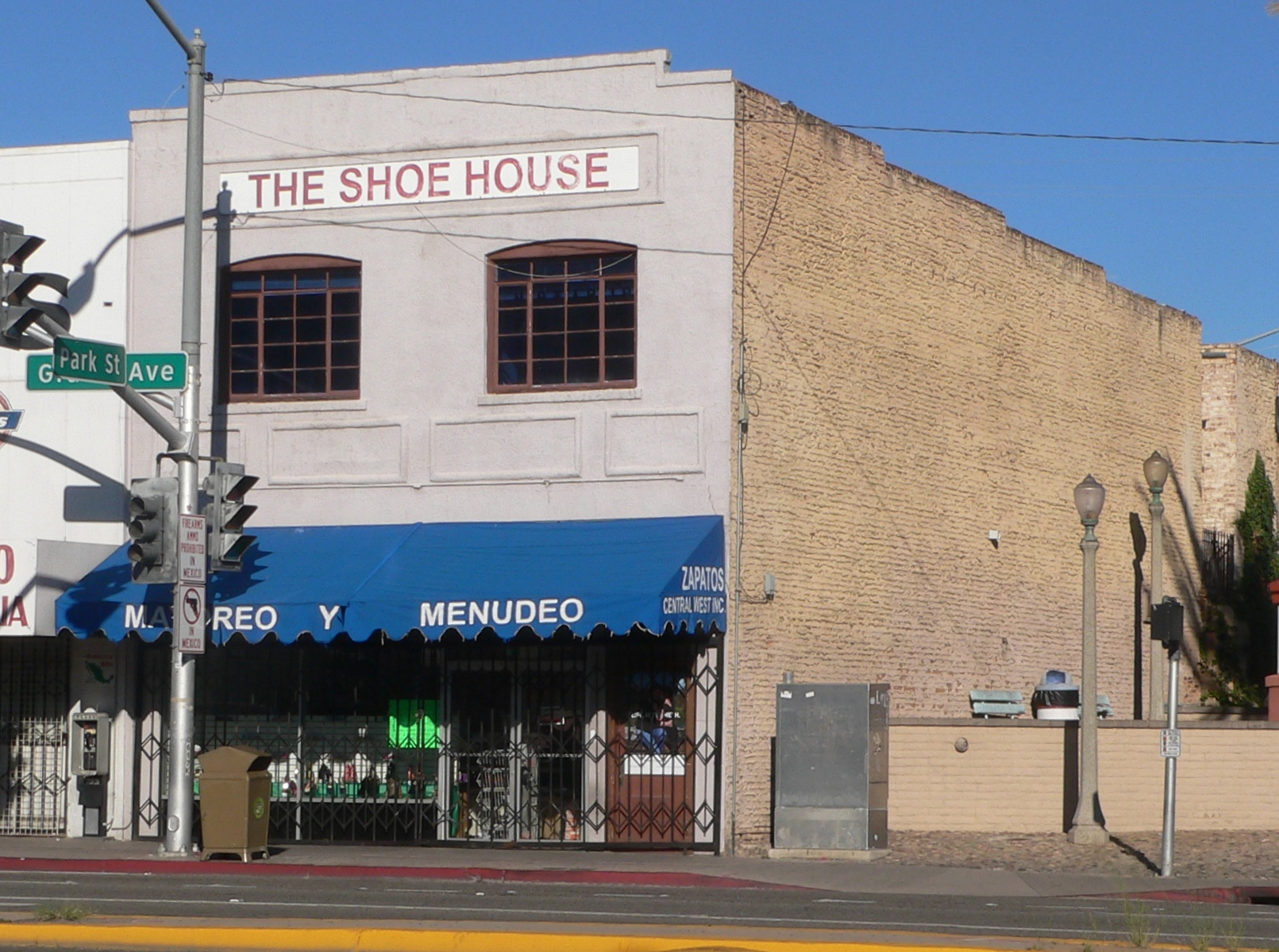
- The building in 2013

- Location within Arizona
- Location: 134 Grande, Nogales, Arizona
- Coordinates: 31°20′04″N 110°56′28″W
- Area: 0 acres (0 ha)
- Built: 1916
- Architectural style: Chicago, Commercial
- MPS: Nogales MRA
- NRHP reference No.: 85001869
- Added to NRHP: August 29, 1985

The J.E. Wise Building is a historic building in Nogales, Arizona. It was built in 1916, and designed in the Chicago school architectural style. The editorial staff of the Nogales Herald newspaper moved into the building in 1918. It has been listed on the National Register of Historic Places since August 29, 1985.
