= Gadsden Purchase =

Land purchased from Mexico by the United States in 1854

Gadsden Purchase of 1854 Venta de La Mesilla
- Expansion of United States
- 1853–1854
- The Gadsden Purchase and main cities
- Area
  - 1854: 76,768 km^{2} (29,640 sq mi)
- Government
  - Type: Federal republic
- President
  - March 4, 1853 – March 4, 1857: Franklin Pierce
- Historical era: Westward expansion and Manifest Destiny
  - Mexican–American War: 1846–1848
  - Treaty drafted: December 30, 1853
  - Treaty approved by U.S. Senate: April 25, 1854
  - Treaty in effect: June 8, 1854
Preceded by	Succeeded by
Second Federal Republic of Mexico	Territory of New Mexico
- Today part of: United States: Arizona; New Mexico

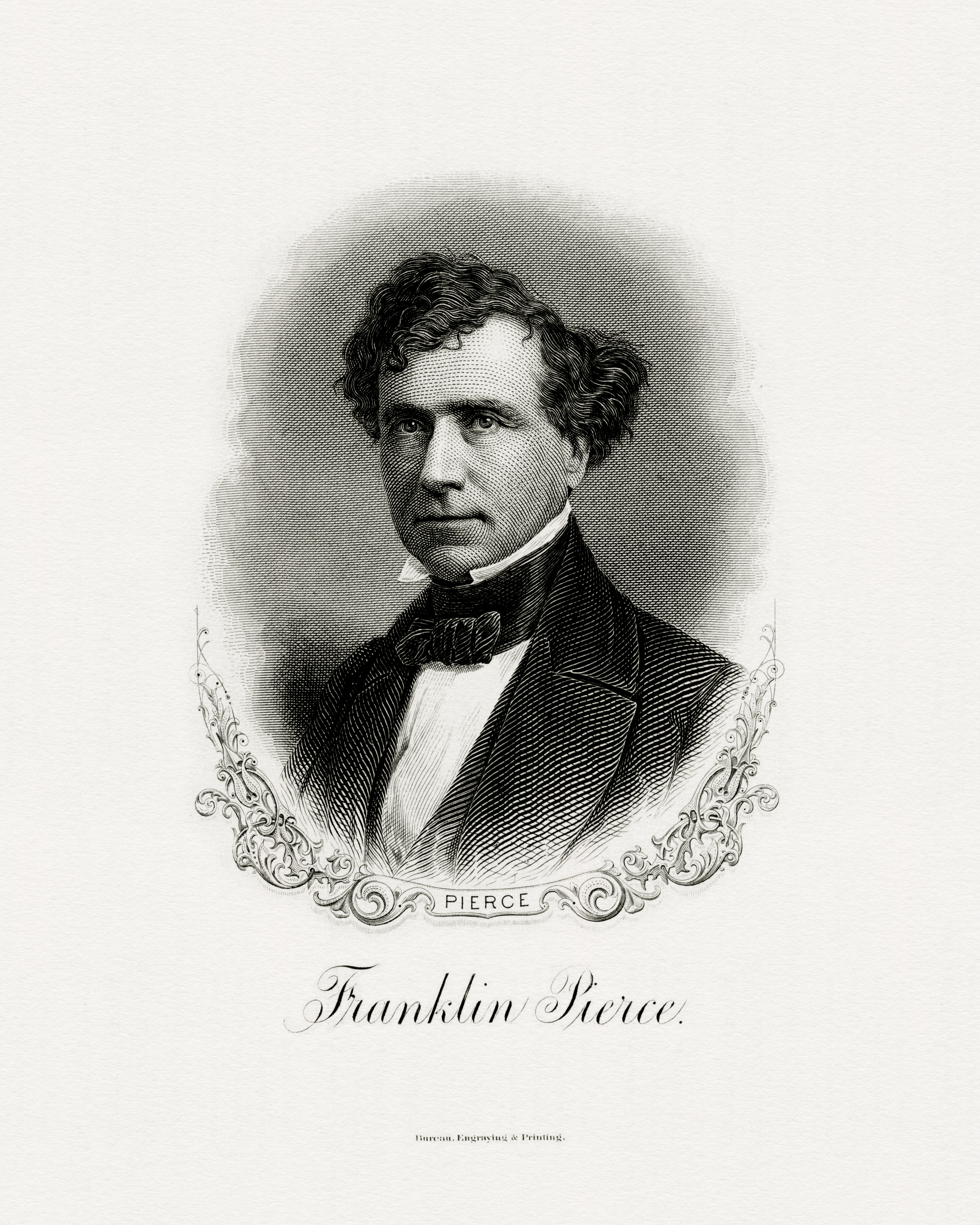
Franklin Pierce BEP portrait

The Gadsden Purchase (Spanish: Venta de La Mesilla, lit. 'La Mesilla sale'), also known as the Treaty of Mesilla, is the acquisition of a 29,640-square-mile (76,800 km^{2}) region of present-day southern Arizona and southwestern New Mexico by the United States from Mexico. The first draft was signed on December 31, 1853, by James Gadsden, US Minister to Mexico, and by Antonio López de Santa Anna, president of Mexico. The treaty took effect on June 8, 1854.

The purchase included lands south of the Gila River and west of the Rio Grande, where the United States wanted to build what is now known as the Sunset Route, a transcontinental railroad to California which the Southern Pacific Railroad later completed in 1881–1883. These lands allowed the railroad to follow a flatter and more direct route, lowering its anticipated costs and allowing faster completion, and particularly encouraging a route to a port in the Southern United States on the Gulf of Mexico. The purchase also clearly defined the current Mexico–United States border.

The Santa Anna government, in financial distress, accepted the sale, which brought Mexico US$10 million (equivalent to $358.3 million in 2025). Following the devastating loss of Mexican territory to the U.S. in the Mexican–American War (1846–48) and the ongoing unauthorized military expeditions in the region led by the territorial governor of New Mexico and known filibuster William Carr Lane, some historians argue that Santa Anna may have calculated that it was better to cede territory through a treaty and receive payment rather than risking the United States simply seizing the territory.

The Gadsden Purchase was the last substantial territorial enlargement of the contiguous United States. The Arizona cities of Yuma, Tucson, Nogales, Sierra Vista, Tombstone, and Douglas, as well as the New Mexico city of Deming are on territory acquired by the U.S. in the Gadsden Purchase.

== Desire for a southern transcontinental rail line ==
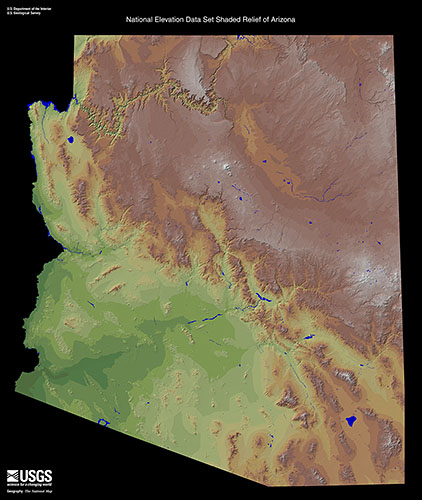
Shaded relief map of Arizona, Basin and Range region to the south, in shades of green

As the railroad age evolved, business-oriented Southerners saw that a railroad linking the South with the Pacific Coast in California would expand trade opportunities. They thought the topography of the southern portion of the original Mexican Cession was too mountainous to allow a direct route. Projected southern railroad routes tended to veer to the north as they proceeded eastward, which would favor connections with northern railroads and ultimately favor northern seaports. Southerners saw that to avoid the mountains, a route with a southeastern terminus might need to swing south into what was still Mexican territory.

The administration of President Pierce, strongly influenced by Secretary of War Jefferson Davis, a Southerner from Mississippi, saw an opportunity to acquire land for the railroad, as well as to acquire significant other territory from northern Mexico. In those years, the debate over slavery in the United States affected many issues, as the acquisition of new territory opened the question of whether it would be slave or free territory. In this case, the debate over slavery ended progress on construction of a southern transcontinental rail line until the early 1880s, although the preferred land became part of the nation and was used as intended after the Civil War.

== Southern route for the transcontinental railroad ==
=== Southern commercial conventions ===
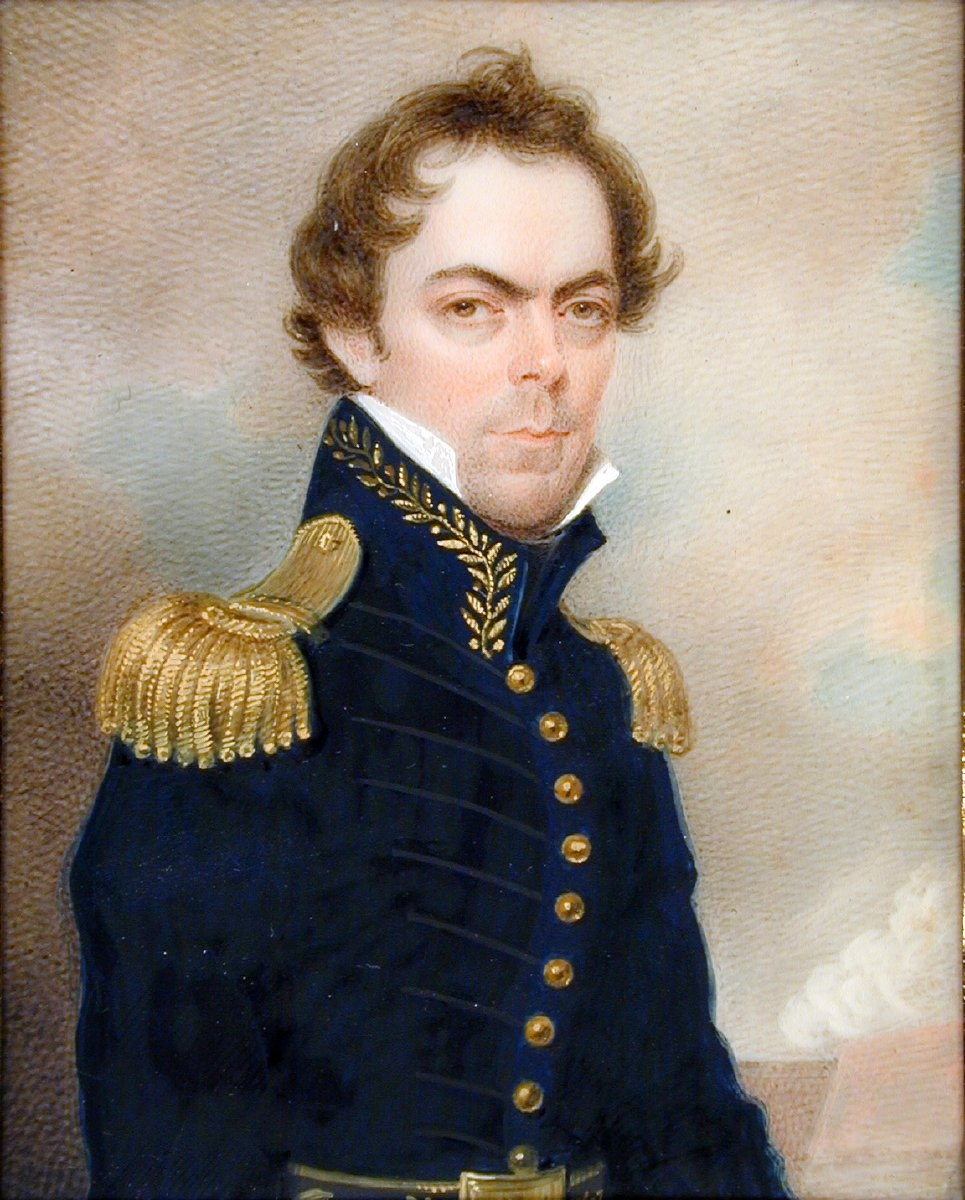
c. 1831 portrait of James Gadsden by Charles Fraser

In January 1845, Asa Whitney of New York presented the United States Congress with the first plan to construct a transcontinental railroad. Although Congress took no action on his proposal, a commercial convention in Memphis later that year took up the issue. Prominent attendees included John C. Calhoun, Clement C. Clay Sr., John Bell, William Gwin, and Edmund P. Gaines, but James Gadsden of South Carolina was influential in the convention's recommending a southern route for the proposed railroad. The route was to begin in Texas and end in San Diego or Mazatlán. Southerners hoped that such a route would ensure Southern prosperity, while opening the "West to southern influence and settlement".

Southern interest in railroads in general, and the Pacific railroad in particular, accelerated after the conclusion of the Mexican–American War in 1848. During that war, topographical officers William H. Emory and James W. Abert had conducted surveys that demonstrated the feasibility of a railroad's originating in El Paso or western Arkansas and ending in San Diego. J. D. B. DeBow, the editor of DeBow's Review, and Gadsden both publicized within the South the benefits of building this railroad.

Gadsden had become the president of the South Carolina Canal and Rail Road Company in 1839; about a decade later, the company had laid 136 miles (219 km) of track extending west from Charleston, South Carolina, and was $3 million (equivalent to $88 million in 2024) in debt. Gadsden wanted to connect all Southern railroads into one sectional network. He was concerned that the increasing railroad construction in the North was shifting trade in lumber, farm and manufacturing goods from the traditional north–south route based on the Ohio and Mississippi rivers to an east–west axis that would bypass the South. He also saw Charleston, his home town, losing its prominence as a seaport. In addition, many Southern business interests feared that a northern transcontinental route would exclude the South from trade with the Orient. Other Southerners argued for diversification from a plantation economy to keep the South independent of northern bankers.

In October 1849, the southern interests held a convention in Memphis, in response to a convention in St. Louis earlier that fall which discussed a northern route. The Memphis convention overwhelmingly advocated the construction of a route beginning there, to connect with an El Paso, Texas to San Diego, California line. Disagreement arose only over the issue of financing. The convention president, Matthew Fontaine Maury of Virginia, preferred strict private financing, whereas John Bell and others thought that federal land grants to railroad developers would be necessary.

=== James Gadsden and California ===
Gadsden supported nullification in 1831. When California was admitted to the Union as a free state in 1850, he advocated secession by South Carolina. Gadsden considered slavery "a social blessing" and abolitionists "the greatest curse of the nation".

When the secession proposal failed, Gadsden worked with his cousin Isaac Edward Holmes, a lawyer in San Francisco since 1851, and California state senator Thomas Jefferson Green, in an attempt to divide California into northern and southern portions and proposed that the southern part allow slavery. Gadsden planned to establish a slave-holding outpost there based on rice, cotton, and sugar, and wanted to use slave labor to build a railroad and highway that originated in either San Antonio or the Red River valley. The railway or highway would transport people to the California gold fields. Toward this end, on December 31, 1851, Gadsden asked Green to secure from the California state legislature a large land grant located between the 34th and 36th parallels, along the proposed dividing line for the two California states.

A few months later, Gadsden and 1,200 potential settlers from South Carolina and Florida submitted a petition to the California legislature for permanent citizenship and permission to establish a rural district that would be farmed by "not less than Two Thousand of their African Domestics". The petition stimulated some debate, but it finally died in committee.

=== Stephen Douglas and land grants ===
The Compromise of 1850, which created the Utah Territory and the New Mexico Territory, would facilitate a southern route to the West Coast since all territory for the railroad was now organized and would allow for federal land grants as a financing measure. Competing northern or central routes championed, respectively, by U.S. Senators Stephen Douglas of Illinois and Thomas Hart Benton of Missouri, would still need to go through unorganized territories. Millard Fillmore established a precedent for using federal land grants when he signed a bill promoted by Douglas that allowed a south to north, Mobile to Chicago railroad to be financed by "federal land grants for the specific purpose of railroad construction". To satisfy Southern opposition to the general principle of federally supported internal improvements, the land grants would first be transferred to the appropriate state or territorial government, which would oversee the final transfer to private developers.

By 1850, however, the majority of the South was not interested in exploiting its advantages in developing a transcontinental railroad or railroads in general. Businessmen like Gadsden, who advocated economic diversification, were in the minority. The Southern economy was based on cotton exports, and then-current transportation networks met the plantation system's needs. There was little home market for an intra-South trade. In the short term, the best use for capital was to invest it in more slaves and land rather than in taxing it to support canals, railroads, roads, or in dredging rivers. Historian Jere W. Roberson wrote:

Southerners might have gained a great deal under the 1850 land grant act had they concentrated their efforts. But continued opposition to Federal aid, filibustering, an unenthusiastic President, the spirit of "Young America", and efforts to build railroads and canals across Central America and the Isthmus of Tehuantepec in Mexico divided their forces, leaving a lot of time for the Pacific railroad. Moreover, the Compromise of 1850 encouraged Southerners not to antagonize opponents by resurrecting the railroad controversy.

— Jere W. Roberson, "The South and the Pacific Railroad, 1845–1855" (April 1974)

== Treaty of Guadalupe Hidalgo ==
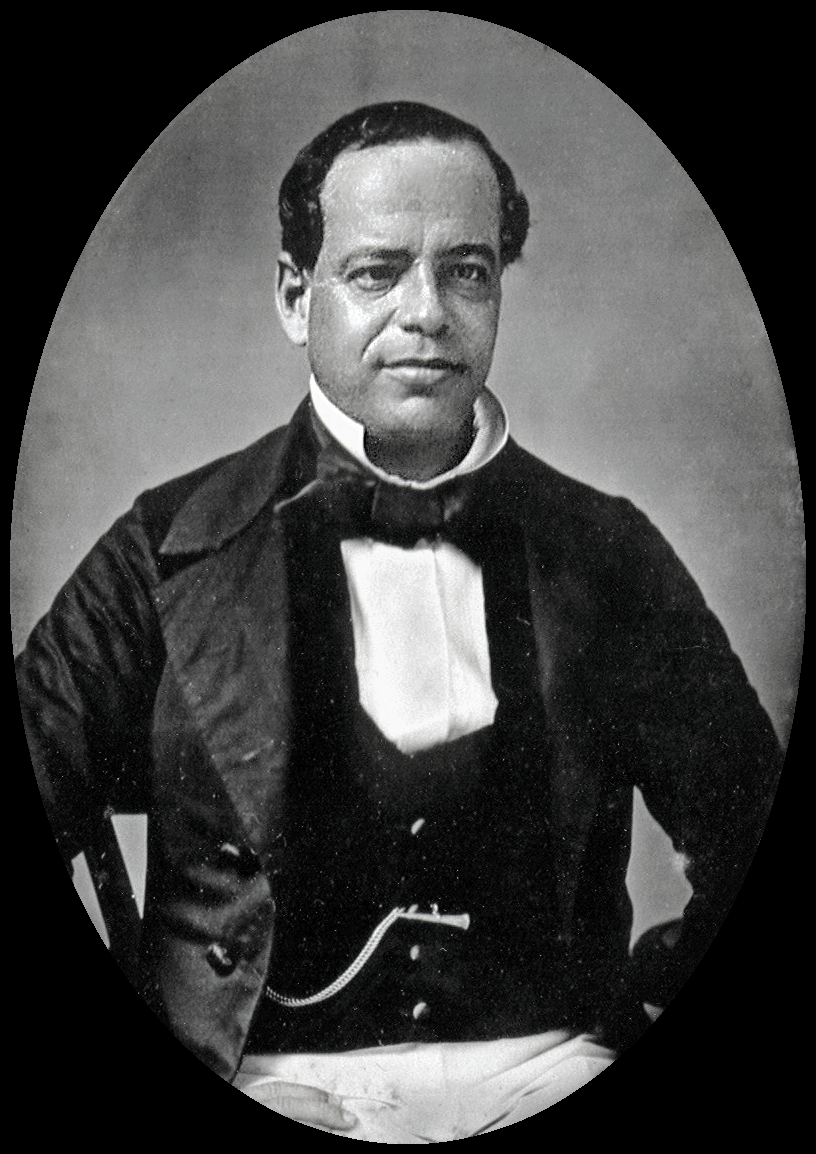
President and General Antonio López de Santa Anna, photo circa 1853

The Treaty of Guadalupe Hidalgo (1848) ended the Mexican–American War, but left issues affecting both sides that still needed to be resolved: possession of the Mesilla Valley, protection for Mexico from Indian raids, and the right of transit in the Isthmus of Tehuantepec.

=== Mesilla Valley ===
The treaty provided for a joint commission, made up of a surveyor and commissioner from each country, to determine the final boundary between the United States and Mexico. The treaty specified that the boundary, after following the Rio Grande River from the sea, would turn west from the river eight miles (13 km) north of El Paso. The treaty was based on an 1847 copy (the Disturnell Map) of a twenty-five-year-old map which was incorporated into the treaty. However, surveys revealed that El Paso was 36 miles (58 km) further south and 100 miles (160 km) further west than the map showed. Mexico favored the map, but the United States put faith in the results of the survey. The disputed territory involved a few thousand square miles and about 3,000 residents; more significantly, it included the Mesilla Valley. Bordering the Rio Grande River, the valley consisted of flat desert land measuring about 50 miles (80 km), north to south, by 200 miles (320 km), east to west. This valley was thought to be essential for construction of a transcontinental railroad using a southern route.

John Bartlett of Rhode Island, the United States negotiator, agreed to allow Mexico to retain the Mesilla Valley by setting the point at which the boundary commenced toward the west from the Rio Grande River at 32° 22′ N. This point was north of the American claim of 31° 52′ N and, at the easternmost part, also north of the Mexican-claimed boundary at 32° 15′ N, both also on the Rio Grande River). Bartlett's agreement to 32° 22′ N was in exchange for a boundary westward from the river that did not turn north until 110° W in order to include the Santa Rita del Cobre Mountains (sometimes referred to simply as the Cobre Mountains) located in current New Mexico east of current-day Silver City. This area was believed to have rich copper deposits, and some silver and gold which had not yet been mined. Southerners opposed retention of the Mesilla Valley by Mexico because of its implication for the railroad, but President Fillmore supported it. Southerners in Congress prevented any action on the approval of this separate border treaty and eliminated further funding to survey the disputed borderland. Robert B. Campbell, a pro-railroad politician from Alabama, later replaced Bartlett. Mexico asserted that the commissioners' determinations were valid and prepared to send in troops to enforce the unratified agreement.

=== Native American raids ===
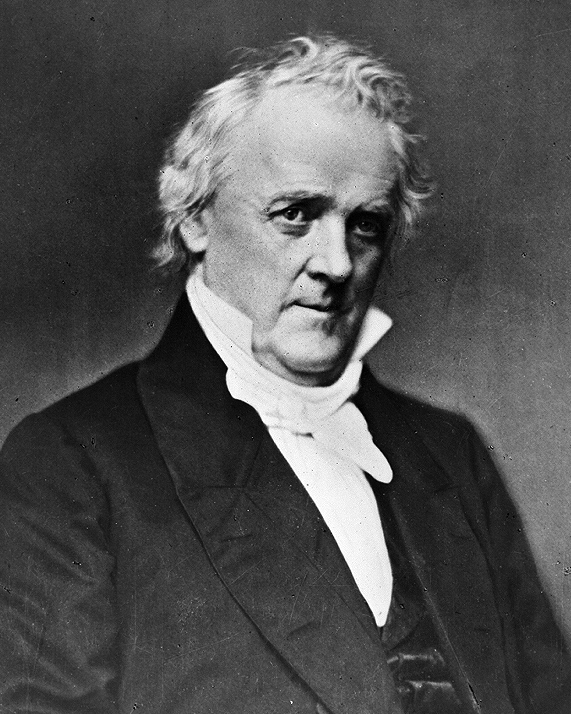
U.S. Secretary of State James Buchanan (1791–1868), who later became 15th President of the United States (1857–1861)

Article XI of the Treaty of Guadalupe Hidalgo contained a guarantee that the United States would protect Mexicans by preventing cross-border raids by local Comanche and Apache tribes. At the time the treaty was ratified, Secretary of State James Buchanan had believed that the United States had both the commitment and resources to enforce this promise. Historian Richard Kluger, however, described the difficulties of the task:

Comanche, Apache, and other tribal warriors had been punishing Spanish, Mexican, and American intruders into their stark homeland for three centuries and been given no incentive to let up their murderous marauding and pillaging, horse stealing in particular. The U. S. Army had posted nearly 8,000 of its total of 11,000 soldiers along the southwestern boundary, but they could not halt the 75,000 or so native nomads in the region from attacking swiftly and taking refuge among the hills, buttes, and arroyos in a landscape where one's enemies could be spotted twenty or thirty miles away.

In the five years after approval of the Treaty, the United States spent $12 million (equivalent to $330 million in 2024) in this area, and General-in-Chief Winfield Scott estimated that five times that amount would be necessary to police the border. Mexican officials, frustrated with the failure of the United States to effectively enforce its guarantee, demanded reparations for the losses inflicted on Mexican citizens by the raids. The United States argued that the Treaty did not require any compensation nor did it require any greater effort to protect Mexicans than was expended in protecting its own citizens. During the Fillmore administration, Mexico claimed damages of $40 million (equivalent to $1.1 billion in 2024) but offered to allow the U.S. to buy-out Article XI for $25 million ($680 million) while President Fillmore proposed a settlement that was $10 million less ($270 million).

=== Isthmus of Tehuantepec ===
During negotiations of the treaty, Americans had failed to secure the right of transit across the 125-mile-wide (201 km) Isthmus of Tehuantepec in southern Mexico. The idea of building a railroad here had been considered for a long time, connecting the Gulf of Mexico with the Pacific Ocean. In 1842 Mexican President Antonio López de Santa Anna sold the rights to build a railroad or canal across the isthmus. The deal included land grants 300 miles (480 km) wide along the right-of-way for future colonization and development. In 1847 a British bank bought the rights, raising U.S. fears of British colonization in the hemisphere, in violation of the precepts of the Monroe Doctrine. United States interest in the right-of-way increased in 1848 after the gold strikes in the Sierra Nevada, which led to the California Gold Rush.

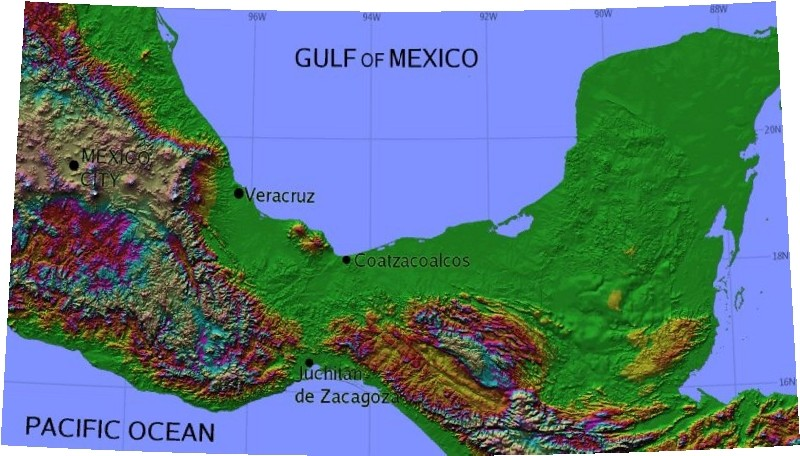
Isthmus of Tehuantepec in southern Mexico

The Memphis commercial convention of 1849 recommended that the United States pursue the trans-isthmus route, since it appeared unlikely that a transcontinental railroad would be built anytime soon. Interests in Louisiana were especially adamant about this option, as they believed that any transcontinental railroad would divert commercial traffic away from the Mississippi and New Orleans, and they at least wanted to secure a southern route. Also showing interest was Peter A. Hargous of New York who ran an import-export business between New York and Vera Cruz. Hargous purchased the rights to the route for $25,000 (equivalent to $700,000 in 2024), but realized that the grant had little value unless it was supported by the Mexican and American governments.

In Mexico, topographical officer George W. Hughes reported to Secretary of State John M. Clayton that a railroad across the isthmus was a "feasible and practical" idea. Clayton then instructed Robert P. Letcher, the minister to Mexico, to negotiate a treaty to protect Hargous's rights. The United States' proposal gave Mexicans a 20% discount on shipping, guaranteed Mexican rights in the zone, allowed the United States to send in military if necessary, and gave the United States most-favored-nation status for Mexican cargo fees. This treaty, however, was never finalized.

The Clayton–Bulwer Treaty between the United States and the United Kingdom, which guaranteed the neutrality of any such canal, was finalized in April 1850. Mexican negotiators refused the treaty because it would eliminate Mexico's ability to play the US and Britain against each other. They eliminated the right of the United States to unilaterally intervene militarily. The United States Senate approved the treaty in early 1851, but the Mexican Congress refused to accept the treaty.

In the meantime, Hargous proceeded as if the treaty would be approved eventually. Judah P. Benjamin and a committee of New Orleans businessmen joined with Hargous and secured a charter from the Louisiana legislature to create the Tehuantepec Railroad Company. The new company sold stock and sent survey teams to Mexico. Hargous started to acquire land even after the Mexican legislature rejected the treaty, a move that led to the Mexicans canceling Hargous's contract to use the right of way. Hargous put his losses at $5 million (equivalent to $146 million in 2024) and asked the United States government to intervene. President Fillmore refused to do so.

Mexico sold the canal franchise, without the land grants, to A. G. Sloo and Associates in New York for $600,000 (equivalent to $18 million in 2024). In March 1853 Sloo contracted with a British company to build a railroad and sought an exclusive contract from the new Franklin Pierce Administration to deliver mail from New York to San Francisco. However, Sloo soon defaulted on bank loans and the contract was sold back to Hargous.

== Final negotiations and ratification of the treaty of purchase ==
The Pierce administration, which took office in March 1853, was strongly pro-southern and pro-expansion. For example, it sent Louisiana Senator Pierre Soulé to Spain to negotiate the acquisition of Cuba. Pierce appointed expansionists John Y. Mason of Virginia and Solon Borland of Arkansas as ministers, respectively, to France and Nicaragua. Pierce's Secretary of War, Jefferson Davis, was already on record as favoring a southern route for a transcontinental railroad.

With respect to the railroad proposal however, the South remained divided. In January 1853, Senator Thomas Jefferson Rusk of Texas introduced a bill to create two railroads—one with a northern route, and one with a southern route. The failure of this bill led to legislative demands, sponsored by William Gwin of California and Salmon P. Chase of Ohio and supported by the railroad interests, for new surveys for possible routes. Gwin expected that a southern route would be approved—both Davis and Robert J. Walker, former Secretary of the Treasury, supported it. Both were stockholders in a Vicksburg-based railroad that planned to build a link to Texas to join up with the southern route. Davis argued that the southern route would have an important military application in the likely event of future troubles with Mexico.

=== Gadsden and Santa Anna ===
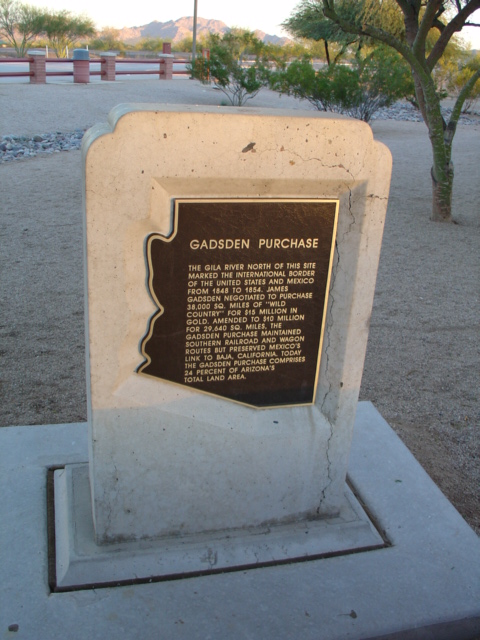
The Gadsden Purchase historical marker near Interstate 10

A treaty initiated during the Fillmore administration that would provide joint Mexican and United States protection for the Sloo grant was signed in Mexico on March 21, 1853. At the same time that this treaty was received in Washington, Pierce learned that New Mexico Territorial Governor William Carr Lane had issued a proclamation claiming the Mesilla Valley as part of New Mexico, leading to protests from Mexico. Pierce was also aware of efforts by France, through its consul in San Francisco, to acquire the Mexican state of Sonora.

Pierce recalled Lane in May and replaced him with David Meriwether of Kentucky. Meriwether was given orders to stay out of the Mesilla Valley until negotiations with Mexico could be completed. Pierce also appointed James Gadsden as minister to Mexico, with specific instructions to negotiate with Mexico over the acquisition of additional territory. Secretary of State William L. Marcy gave Gadsden clear instructions: he was to secure the Mesilla Valley for the purposes of building a railroad through it, convince Mexico that the US had done its best regarding the Indian raids, and elicit Mexican cooperation in efforts by US citizens to build a canal or railroad across the Isthmus of Tehuantepec. Supporting the interests of Sloo and his private enterprise was not part of the instructions. Gadsden met with Santa Anna in Mexico City on September 25, 1853, to discuss the terms of the treaty.

The Mexican government was going through political and financial turmoil at that time. Santa Anna had been returned to power at about the same time that Pierce was inaugurated. Santa Anna was willing to deal with the United States because he needed money to rebuild the Mexican Army for defense against the United States. He initially rejected the extension of the border further south to the Sierra Madre Mountains, and insisted on reparations for the damages caused by American Indian raids.

Gadsden realized that Santa Anna needed money and passed this information along to Secretary Marcy. Marcy and Pierce responded with new instructions. Gadsden was authorized to purchase any of six parcels of land with a price fixed for each. The price would include the settlement of all Indian damages and relieve the United States from any further obligation to protect Mexicans. $50 million (equivalent to $1.5 billion in 2024) would have bought the Baja California peninsula and a large portion of the northwestern Mexican states, while $15 million ($440 million) would purchase the 38,000 square miles (98,000 km^{2}) of desert necessary for the railroad plans.

Gadsden told Santa Anna that "the spirit of the age" would soon lead the northern Mexican states to secede, so he might as well sell them now. Mexico initially balked at any large-scale sale of territory. Santa Anna felt threatened by William Walker's attempt to capture Baja California Territory and Sonora. Gadsden disavowed any government backing of Walker, who retreated to the US and was placed on trial for violating the Neutrality Act of 1794. Santa Anna worried that the US would allow further aggression against Mexican territory. He wanted to get as much money for as little territory as possible.

After the United Kingdom rejected Mexican requests to assist in the negotiations, Santa Anna opted for the $15 million package. Santa Anna and Gadsden signed the treaty on December 30, 1853, and the treaty was presented to the U.S. Senate for confirmation.

=== Ratification ===
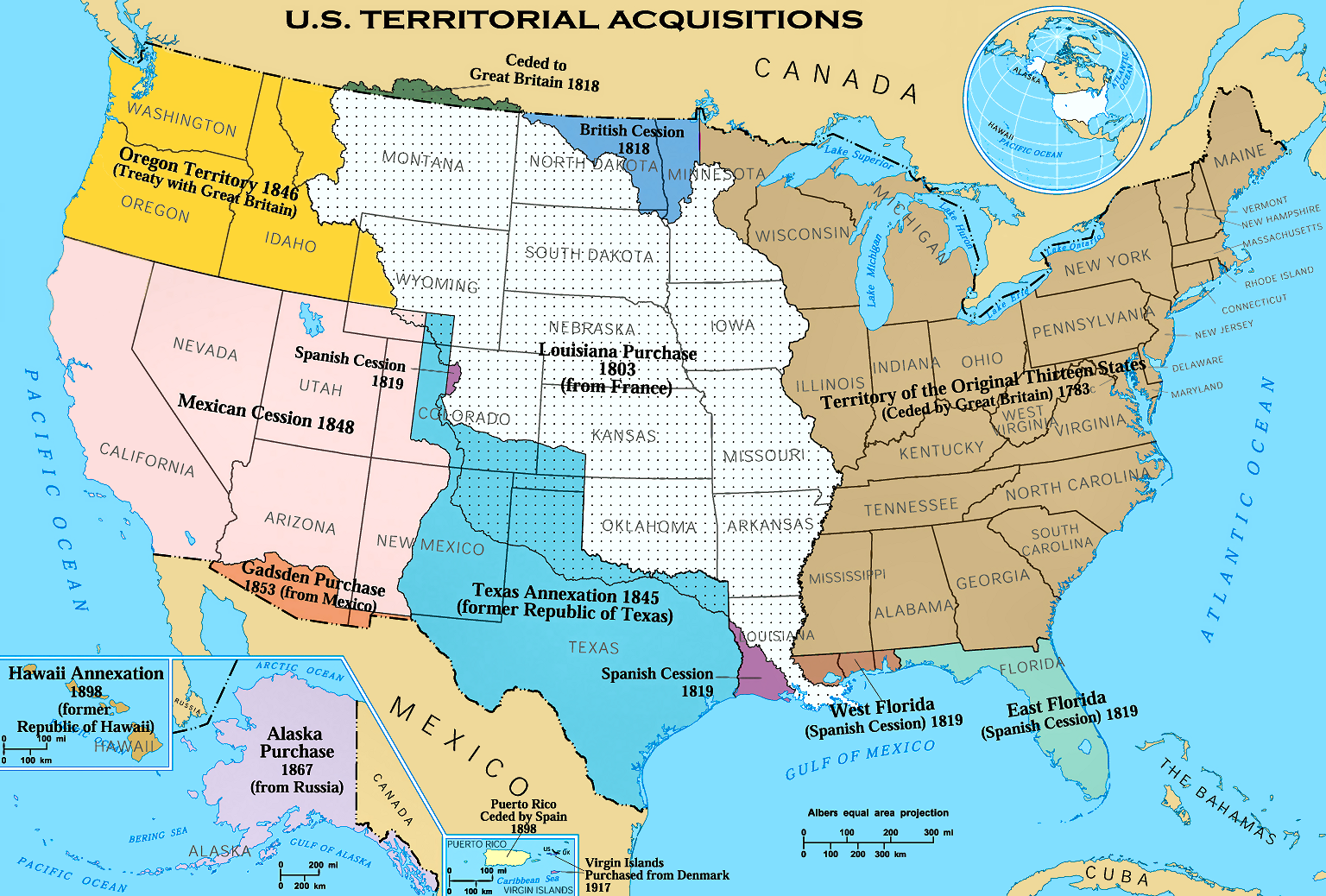
Territorial enlargement of the United States, the Gadsden Purchase shown in red-orange

Pierce and his cabinet began debating the treaty in January 1854. Although disappointed in the amount of territory secured and some of the terms, Pierce signed it, and submitted it to the Senate on February 10. Gadsden, however, suggested that northern Senators would block the treaty to deny the South a railroad.

The treaty needed a two-thirds vote in favor of ratification in the US Senate, where it met strong opposition. Anti-slavery senators opposed further acquisition of potential slave territory. Lobbying by speculators gave the treaty a bad reputation. Some Senators objected to furnishing Santa Anna financial assistance.

The treaty reached the Senate as that body focused on the debate over the Kansas–Nebraska Act. On April 17, after much debate, the Senate voted 27 to 18 in favor of the treaty, falling three votes short of the necessary two-thirds majority. After this defeat, Secretary Davis and southern Senators pressed Pierce to add more provisions to the treaty including:

- protection for the Sloo grant;
- a requirement that Mexico "protect with its whole power the prosecution, preservation, and security of the work [referring to the isthmian canal]";
- permission for the United States to intervene unilaterally "when it may feel sanctioned and warranted by the public or international law"; and
- a reduction of the territory to be acquired by more than 10,000 square miles (26,000 km^{2}) to the final size of 29,640-square-mile (76,800 km^{2}), and dropping the price to $10 million (equivalent to $270 million in 2024) from $15 million ($410 million).

The final version of the Gadsden Purchase Treaty defines the Mexico–United States border as follows:

Beginning in the Gulf of Mexico, three leagues from land, opposite the mouth of the Rio Grande, as provided in the 5th article of the treaty of Guadalupe Hidalgo; thence, as defined in the said article, up the middle of that river to the point where the parallel of 31° 47' north latitude crosses the same; thence due west one hundred miles; thence south to the parallel of 31° 20' north latitude; thence along the said parallel of 31° 20' to the 111th meridian of longitude west of Greenwich; thence in a straight line to a point on the Colorado River twenty English miles below the junction of the Gila and Colorado rivers; thence up the middle of the said river Colorado until it intersects the present line between the United States and Mexico.

This version of the treaty successfully passed the US Senate April 25, 1854, by a vote of 33 to 12. The reduction in territory was an accommodation of northern senators who opposed the acquisition of additional slave territory. In the final vote, northerners split 12 to 12. Gadsden took the revised treaty back to Santa Anna, who accepted the changes. The treaty went into effect June 30, 1854.

While the land was available for construction of a southern railroad, the issue had become too strongly associated with the sectional debate over slavery to receive federal funding. Roberson wrote:

The unfortunate debates in 1854 left an indelible mark on the course of national politics and the Pacific railroad for the remainder of the antebellum period. It was becoming increasingly difficult, if not outright impossible, to consider any proposal that could not somehow be construed as relating to slavery and, therefore, sectional issues. Although few people fully realized it at the close of 1854, sectionalism had taken such a firm, unrelenting hold on the nation that completion of an antebellum Pacific railroad was prohibited. Money, interest, and enthusiasm were devoted to emotion-filled topics, not the Pacific railroad.

— Jere W. Roberson, "The South and the Pacific Railroad, 1845–1855" (April 1974)

The effect was such that railroad development, which accelerated in the North, stagnated in the South.

== Post-ratification controversy ==
As originally envisioned, the purchase would have encompassed a much larger region, extending far enough south to include most of the current Mexican states of Baja California, Baja California Sur, Coahuila, Chihuahua, Sonora, Nuevo León, and Tamaulipas. The Mexican people opposed such boundaries, as did anti-slavery Americans, who saw the purchase as the acquisition of more slave territory. Even the sale of a relatively small strip of land angered the Mexican people, who saw Santa Anna's actions as a betrayal of their country. They watched in dismay as he squandered the funds generated by the Purchase. Contemporary Mexican historians continue to view the deal negatively and believe that it has defined the Mexico–United States relationship in a deleterious way.

The purchased lands were initially appended to the existing New Mexico Territory. To help control the new land, the United States Army established Fort Buchanan on Sonoita Creek (three miles southwest of present-day Sonoita, Arizona) on November 17, 1856. The difficulty of governing the new areas from the territorial capital at Santa Fe led to efforts as early as 1856 to organize a new territory out of the southern portion. Many of the early settlers in the region were, however, pro-slavery and sympathetic to the South, resulting in an impasse in Congress as to how best to reorganize the territory.

The shifting of the course of the Rio Grande caused a later dispute over the boundary between Purchase lands and those of the state of Texas, known as the Country Club Dispute.

Pursuant to the Treaty of Guadalupe Hidalgo, the Gadsden Treaty, and subsequent treaties, the International Boundary and Water Commission (IBWC) was established in 1889 to maintain the border. Pursuant to still later treaties, the IBWC expanded its duties to the allocation of river waters between the two nations, and provided for flood control and water sanitation. Once viewed as a model of international cooperation, in recent decades the IBWC has been heavily criticized as an institutional anachronism, rendered obsolete by modern social, environmental, and political issues.

=== Cost effectiveness ===
Geologist Harold L. James stated in 1969 about the Gadsden Purchase: "Although the boundary controversy did not teach any lessons or impart any wisdom, it did lead to the purchase of an extremely valuable strip of territory that has more than paid for itself in subsequent mineral and agricultural resources. Despite the comedy of errors, chaos, and misunderstanding, the Southwest must therefore be grateful."

However, economist David R. Barker estimated in 2009 that the purchase was likely not profitable for the United States federal government. Stating that "Current historical accounts take it for granted that the purchase has been a boon to the United States", he calculated that the region produces little tax revenue; most mines are on Indian reservations which receive all royalties. The federal government spent a great deal of money during the 19th century to defend the territory from Apaches that would not have been necessary without the purchase.

== Growth of the region after 1854 ==
=== Army control ===
The residents of the area gained full US citizenship and slowly assimilated into American life over the next half-century. The principal threat to the peace and security of settlers and travelers in the area was raids by Apache Indians. The US Army took control of the purchase lands in 1854 but not until 1856 were troops stationed in the troubled region. In June 1857 it established Fort Buchanan south of the Gila at the head of the Sonoita Creek Valley. The fort protected the area until it was officially abandoned in 1861, and destroyed in 1865. The new stability brought miners and ranchers. By the late 1850s mining camps and military posts had not only transformed the Arizona countryside; they had also generated new trade links to the state of Sonora, Mexico. Magdalena, Sonora, became a supply center for Tubac; wheat from nearby Cucurpe fed the troops at Fort Buchanan; and the town of Santa Cruz sustained the Mowry mines, just miles to the north.

=== Civil War ===
In 1861, during the American Civil War, the Confederate States of America formed the Confederate Territory of Arizona, including in the new territory mainly areas acquired by the Gadsden Purchase. In 1863, using a north-to-south dividing line, the Union created its own Arizona Territory out of the western half of the New Mexico Territory. The new American Arizona Territory also included most of the land acquired in the Gadsden Purchase. This territory would be admitted into the Union as the State of Arizona on February 14, 1912, the last area of the Lower 48 States to receive statehood.

=== Social development ===
After the Gadsden Purchase, southern Arizona's social elite, including the Estevan Ochoa, Mariano Samaniego, and Leopoldo Carillo families, remained primarily Mexican American until the coming of the railroad in the 1880s. When the Sonora Exploring and Mining Company opened silver mines in southern Arizona, it sought to employ educated, middle-class Americans who shared a work ethic and leadership abilities to operate the mines. A biographical analysis of some 200 of its employees, classed as capitalists, managers, laborers, and general service personnel, reveals that the resulting work force included Europeans, Americans, Mexicans, and Indians. This mixture failed to stabilize the remote area, which lacked formal social, political, and economic organization in the years from the Gadsden Purchase to the Civil War.

=== Economic development ===
From the late 1840s into the 1870s, Texas stockmen drove their beef cattle through southern Arizona on the Texas–California trail. Texans were impressed with the grazing possibilities offered by the Gadsden Purchase country of Arizona. In the last third of the century, they moved their herds into Arizona and established the range cattle industry there. The Texans contributed their proven range methods to the new grass country of Arizona, but also brought their problems as well. Texas rustlers brought lawlessness, poor management resulted in overstocking, and carelessness introduced destructive diseases. But these difficulties did force laws and associations in Arizona to curb and resolve them. The Anglo-American cattleman frontier in Arizona was an extension of the Texas experience.

When the Arizona Territory was formed in 1863 from the southern portion of the New Mexico Territory, Pima County and later Cochise County—created from the easternmost portion of Pima County in January 1881—were subject to ongoing border-related conflicts. The area was characterized by rapidly growing boom towns, ongoing Apache raids, smuggling and cattle rustling across the United States-Mexico border, growing ranching operations, and the expansion of new technologies in mining, railroading, and telecommunications.

In the 1860s conflict between the Apaches and the Americans was at its height. Until 1886, almost constant warfare existed in the region adjacent to the Mexican border. The illegal cattle operations kept beef prices in the border region lower and provided cheap stock that helped small ranchers get by. Many early Tombstone, Arizona residents looked the other way when it was "only Mexicans" being robbed.

Outlaws derisively called "The Cowboys" frequently robbed stagecoaches and brazenly stole cattle in broad daylight, scaring off the legitimate cowboys watching the herds. Bandits used the border between the United States and Mexico to raid across in one direction and take sanctuary in the other. In December 1878, and again the next year, Mexican authorities complained about the "Cowboy" outlaws who stole Mexican beef and resold it in Arizona. The Arizona Citizen reported that both U.S. and Mexican bandits were stealing horses from the Santa Cruz Valley and selling them in Sonora. Arizona Territorial Governor Frémont investigated the Mexican government's allegations and accused them in turn of allowing outlaws to use Sonora as a base of operations for raiding into Arizona.

In the 1870s and 1880s there was considerable tension in the region—between the rural residents, who were for the most part Democrats from the agricultural South, and town residents and business owners, who were largely Republicans from the industrial Northeast and Midwest. The tension culminated in what has been called the Cochise County feud, and the Earp-Clanton feud, which ended with the historic Gunfight at the O.K. Corral and Wyatt Earp's Vendetta Ride.

The Gadsden purchase resulted in the division of the Tohono Oʼodham Nation and its ancestral lands by the new international border. This disrupted traditional migratory practices and transportation of materials and goods essential for their spirituality, economy and traditional culture. Nine communities are on the Mexican side of this boundary. Conflicts have arisen mainly in the 21st century with stronger enforcement of customs laws at the border.

=== Railroad development ===
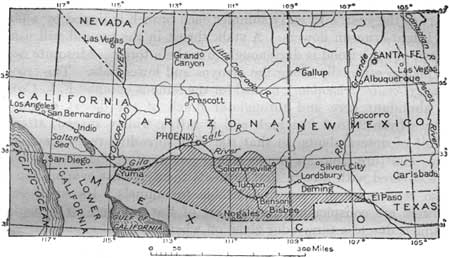
The railroad route through the Gadsden Purchase, after the Phoenix rerouting

In 1846, James Gadsden, then president of the South Carolina Railroad, proposed building a transcontinental railroad linking the Atlantic at Charleston with the Pacific at San Diego. Federal and private surveys by Lt. John G. Parke and Andrew B Gray proved the feasibility of the southern transcontinental route, but sectional strife and the Civil War delayed construction of the proposed railroad. The Southern Pacific Railroad from Los Angeles reached Yuma, Arizona, in 1877, Tucson, Arizona, in March 1880, Deming, New Mexico, in December 1880, and El Paso in May 1881, the first railroad across the Gadsden Purchase.

At the same time, 1879–1881, the Atchison, Topeka and Santa Fe Railroad was building across New Mexico and met the Southern Pacific at Deming, New Mexico, March 7, 1881, completing the second transcontinental railroad (the first, the central transcontinental, was completed May 10, 1869 at Promontory Summit, Utah). Acquiring trackage rights over the SP, from Deming to Benson, the Santa Fe then built a line southwest to Guaymas, Sonora, Mexico, completed October 1882, as its first outlet to the Pacific. This line was later sold to the Southern Pacific. The Southern Pacific continued building east from El Paso, completing a junction with the Texas & Pacific in December 1881, and finally in 1883, its own southern transcontinental, the Sunset Route, California to New Orleans, Atlantic waters to the Pacific. These railroads caused an early 1880s mining boom in such locales as Tombstone, Arizona, Bisbee, Arizona, and Santa Rita, New Mexico, the latter two world class copper producers. From Bisbee, a third sub-transcontinental was built across the Gadsden Purchase, the El Paso and Southwestern Railroad, to El Paso by 1905, then to a link with the Rock Island line to form the Golden State Route. The EP&SW was sold to the Southern Pacific in the early 1920s.

The portion of the Southern Pacific in Arizona was originally largely in the Gadsden Purchase but the western part was later rerouted north of the Gila River to serve the city of Phoenix (as part of the agreement in purchasing the EP&SW). The portion in New Mexico runs largely through the territory that had been disputed between Mexico and the United States after the Treaty of Guadalupe Hidalgo had gone into effect, and before the time of the Gadsden Purchase. The Santa Fe Railroad Company also completed a railroad across Northern Arizona, via Holbrook, Winslow, Flagstaff, and Kingman in August 1883. These two transcontinental railroads, the Southern Pacific (now part of the Union Pacific Railroad) and the Santa Fe (now part of the BNSF), are among the busiest rail lines in the United States.

During the early twentieth century, a number of short-lines usually associated with mining booms were built in the Gadsden Purchase to Ajo, Silverbell, Twin Buttes, Courtland, Gleeson, Arizona; Shakespeare, New Mexico; and other mine sites. Most of these railroads have been abandoned.

The remainder of the Gila Valley pre-Purchase border area was traversed by the Arizona Eastern Railway by 1899 and the Copper Basin Railway by 1904. Excluded was a 20-mile (32 km) section 33.1°N 110.6°W in the San Carlos Apache Indian Reservation, from today's San Carlos Lake to Winkelman at the mouth of the San Pedro River, including the Needle's Eye Wilderness. The section of US Highway 60 about 20 miles (32 km) between Superior and Miami via Top-of-the-World (this road segment is east of Phoenix, in the Tonto National Forest passing through a mountainous region), takes an alternate route (17.4 road miles) between the Magma Arizona Railroad and the Arizona Eastern Railway railheads on each side of this gap. This highway is well north of the Gadsden Purchase. Given the elevations of those three places, at least a 3% grade would have been required for rails built here, rather than the final alignment; railroads prefer 1% or less grade for better operation. This rugged terrain above the Gila River confirms the engineering, technical wisdom of acquiring the Gadsden Purchase for a southern transcontinental railroad. To William H. Emory of the U. S. Army Corps of Topographical Engineers who surveyed the region in the 1840s–1850s, it was a good route "to the Pacific."

== Population ==
=== Arizona ===
The boundaries of most counties in Arizona do not follow the northern boundary of the Gadsden Purchase, but six counties in Arizona do have most of their populations within the land of the Gadsden Purchase. Four of these also contain areas north of the Gadsden Purchase, but these areas have low population densities, with the exception of northeastern Pinal County including the towns of Apache Junction and Florence. Maricopa County also extends south into the area of the Gadsden Purchase, but this area is also thinly populated. Tucson is the largest city in the Gadsden Purchase.

County	Seat	Pop.	Area (mi^{2})	Area (km^{2})
Cochise	Bisbee	131,346	6,219	16,110
Graham	Safford	37,220	4,641	12,020
Pima	Tucson	980,263	9,189	23,800
Pinal	Florence	375,770	5,374	13,920
Santa Cruz	Nogales	47,420	1,238	3,210
Yuma	Yuma	195,751	5,519	14,290
	Total	1,767,770	32,180	83,350

The northernmost point of the Gadsden Purchase, and also along the national border during the period of 1848–53, is at approximately 33°23′30″N 112°23′0″W in Goodyear, about 30 miles (48 km) southwest of Phoenix.

=== New Mexico ===
Mesilla was at that time the largest city in what would become the State of New Mexico, with more than 2,000 residents in 1860 — more than twice that of Las Cruces. At that time, most of the population was of Mexican descent. Mesilla was the capital of the short-lived Confederate Arizona during the American Civil War.

When the Atchison, Topeka and Santa Fe Railway reached the area, the landowners of Mesilla refused to sell it the rights-of-way. Residents of Las Cruces then donated the rights-of-way and land for a depot in Las Cruces.

Lordsburg, New Mexico, the county seat of Hidalgo County, was in the disputed area before the Gadsden Purchase.

Deming, New Mexico, the county seat of Luna County, was north of both the Mexican and American land claims before the Gadsden Purchase, though the proposed Bartlett–Conde compromise of 1851 would have left Deming in Mexico, or stated in positive terms, the negotiations for the Gadsden Purchase resolved the border disputes with Mexico, as well as transferred this land to the U.S.

Sunland Park (population 16,702 in 2020) in Doña Ana County, New Mexico, is currently the largest community of New Mexico in the Gadsden Purchase.

== In popular culture ==
The consequences of the Gadsden Purchase for Mexicans and Native Americans living in the region form the background of the story in the film Conquest of Cochise (Columbia, 1953).

The United States Post Office Department issued a postage stamp commemorating 100 years since the Gadsden Purchase, on December 30, 1953.

The Gadsden Purchase has a reputation as a dim memory Americans have from school: they remember the name, but do not remember its significance or where it is. One of these was in the National Lampoon's "Magical Misery Tour" in 1971.

In 2012, the Gadsden Purchase was featured in a segment on Late Night with Jimmy Fallon.

A supporting character in the 2021 novel Billy Summers by Stephen King is named "Gadsden Drake" after the Gadsden Purchase.

== See also ==
- Butterfield Overland Mail
- Confederate Arizona
- Gadsden Purchase half dollar
- Historic regions of the United States
- Mexico–United States border
- Republic of Sonora
- Traditional Arizona
