= Battle of Fort Buchanan =

1865 attack during the Apache Wars in Arizona

Coordinates: 31°39′27″N 110°42′25″W

- Part of Apache Wars, American Civil War
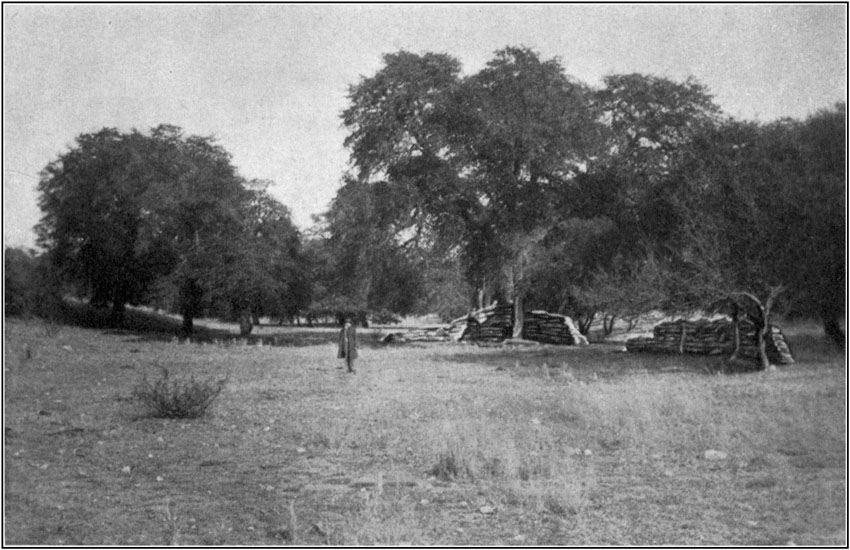
- Ruins of Fort Buchanan in 1914.
Date	February 17, 1865
Location	Fort Buchanan, Arizona Territory now in Santa Cruz County, Arizona
Result	Apache victory, Fort Buchanan destroyed.

Belligerents
United States	Apache

Commanders and leaders
(United States) Michael Buckley	Cochise

Strength
9 cavalry 1 fort	~75 warriors

Casualties and losses
1 killed 1 wounded 1 fort destroyed	~2 killed
- Civilian Casualties: 3 killed

The Battle of Fort Buchanan was an Apache attack on the United States Army post of Old Fort Buchanan in southern Arizona Territory, which occurred on February 17, 1865. Though a skirmish, it ended with a significant Apache victory when they forced the small garrison of California Volunteers to retreat to the Santa Rita Mountains. Fort Buchanan was the only American military post conquered during the war against the Chiricahua.

== Background ==
Because of the major civil war in the United States from 1861 to 1865 and numerous conflicts involving the various Native American tribes, the Union Army was stretched thin on the frontier. The southern half of New Mexico Territory and the newly created Arizona Territory joined the Confederacy in 1861, so troops in California were raised to occupy the region. After Lieutenant George Bascom's 1860 confrontation with Chief Cochise (sometimes called the Bascom affair), the Apache began attacking Union and Confederate troops across Arizona. By early 1865 the Chiricahua War was still being waged. According to reports at the time of attack, only nine American cavalrymen manned the fort, which did not have walls and was just a collection of military buildings including a vedette station. Corporal Michael Buckley from Company L of the 1st California Cavalry commanded and with the eight others he occupied the vedette station that was very similar to a small house.

== Battle ==
The battle began on the morning of February 17, 1865, twelve miles away from the fort when two surveyors of the United States General Land Office and a young Mexican boy were attacked. William Wrightson and Gilbert W. Hopkins were traveling from a ranch in the Santa Ritas towards the fort, presently three miles west of Sonoita. Suddenly, dozens of Apache warriors opened fire with both rifles and bows. A chase started in the direction of Fort Buchanan because everyone was mounted. The three had nearly made it there when they were overwhelmed and killed; the United States Army reported that the three did not attempt to defend themselves; no gunshots were heard, and Corporal Buckley later said that he did not know that Wrightson and Hopkins were in the area. Mount Wrightson and Mount Hopkins, the two highest peaks of the Santa Ritas, were later named after the men.

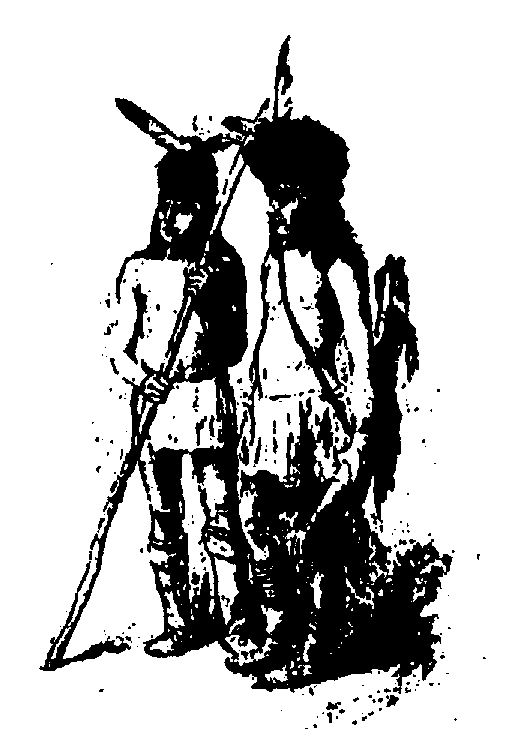
Apache warriors in their traditional tribal wear.

Afterward, the Apache moved on to the nearby vedette station where Corporal Buckley was sitting on the porch while five other privates rested inside. The corporal did not know he was under attack and had beforehand sent two men to cut hay in a field nearby and one man to go hunting. The Apache achieved a surprise approach and commenced the attack by sniping the corporal. Buckley was still sitting on the porch when a warrior snuck up close to him and opened fire. A bullet lodged into Buckley's thigh, and he then raised his revolver and killed the warrior who fired the shot. Buckley then crawled inside the station as a swarm of warriors quickly surrounded the building. A private opened fire while covering Buckley and killed a second native. The Americans took up defensive positions against an enemy estimated by Buckley to be around 75 men. They fired their rifles through the port holes and fought off a first attack at close range. From then on the natives skirmished with the Americans at a further range.

Eventually the Apache set fire to the building, and several minutes later as the roof was caving in Buckley ordered his men to retreat. To do this they would have to charge through the enemy and into the surrounding hills. When the soldiers made their retreat, they fired wildly and were chased until reaching the hills where the Apaches gave up. Corporal Buckley and his men marched on foot to the mines in the Santa Ritas and reached safety. Private George English, the soldier that had been sent hunting before the attack, was never seen or heard from again; he was first recorded as missing until being presumed dead. The two soldiers that were cutting hay heard the sound of shooting and headed back to the fort, when they arrived, they found it surrounded by warriors who were emptying the buildings of goods and burning them, they also retreated to the Santa Ritas and later rejoined their troop.

== Aftermath ==
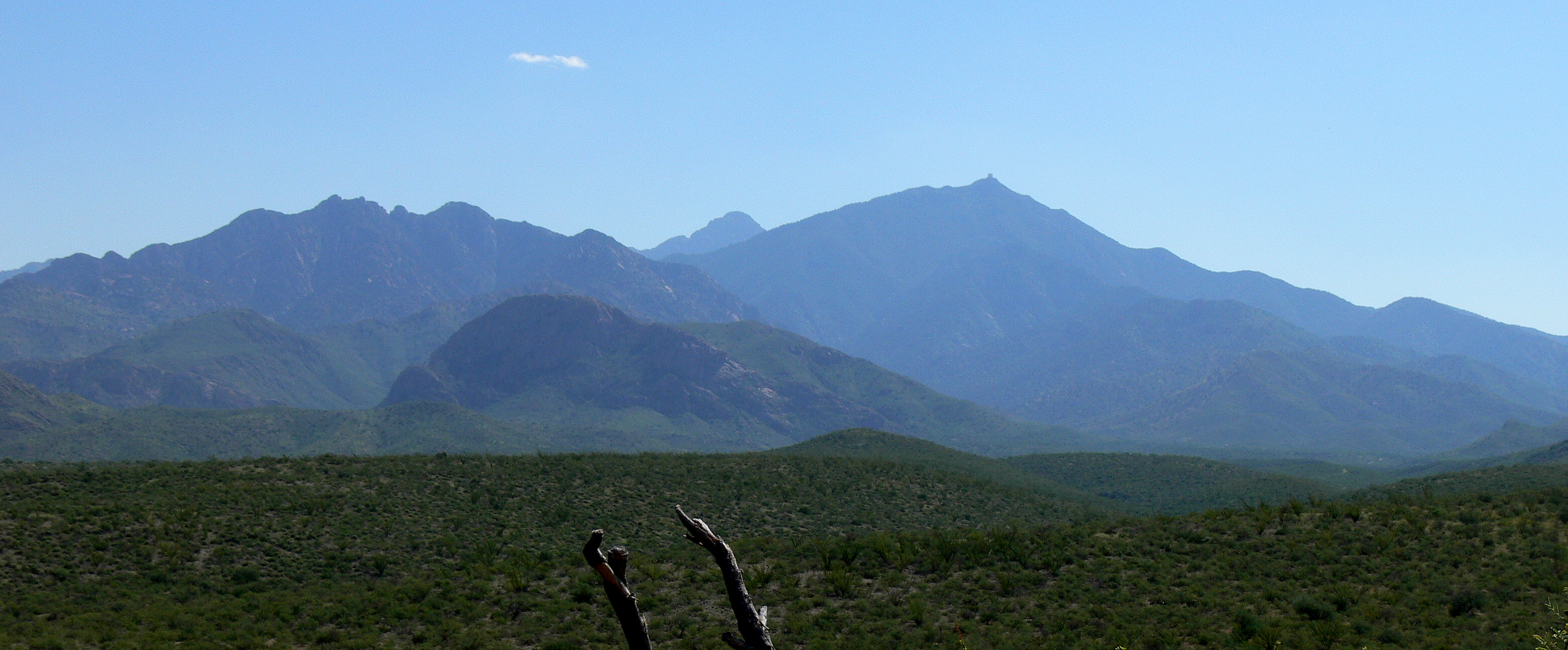
Mount Wrightson (center) and Mount Hopkins (right)

Two Apaches were confirmed to have been killed by Buckley who also said that because of the smoke from their rifles and the burning station, he could not tell if there were other casualties. Six horses were captured along with 250 rounds of ammunition, 200 rations, two carbine rifles and six United States Cavalry uniforms. On the following day Captain John L. Miriam received news of the attack and proceeded to the fort with 25 men. Just outside the post, the bodies of Wrightson, Hopkins and the boy were discovered and buried. After examining the condition of Fort Buchanan, Captain Miriam ordered it abandoned and returned to Fort Tubac to the west where the rest of Company L was stationed. Fort Crittenden was later built a half mile east of Fort Buchanan in 1867

== See also ==
- List of battles won by Indigenous peoples of the Americas
