= Fort Crittenden =

1867 US Army post in Arizona

Coordinates: 31°39′27″N 110°42′25″W

- Sonoita, Arizona
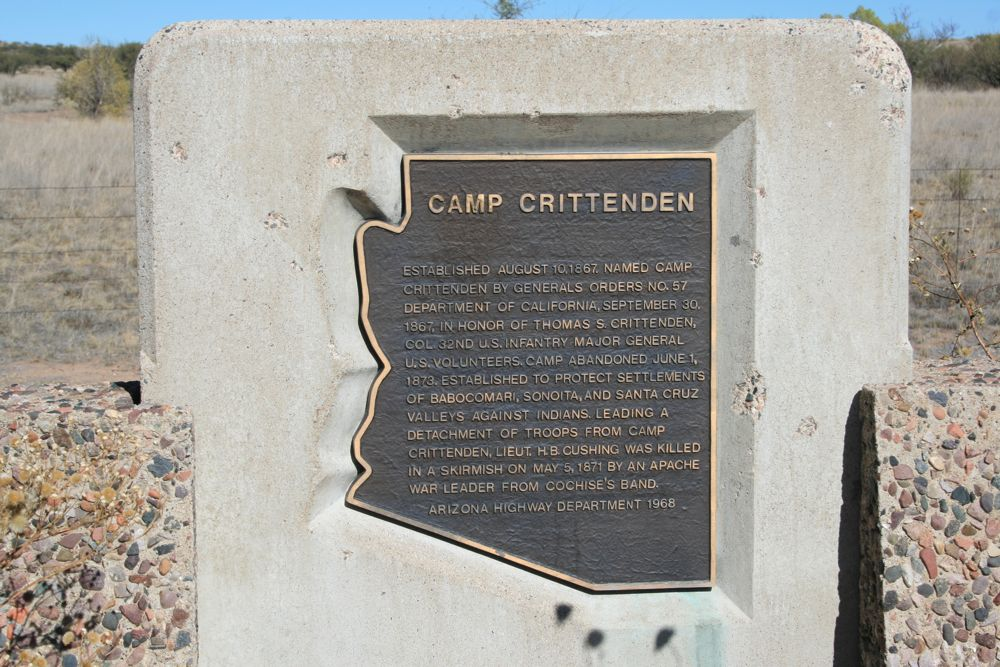
- A plaque commemorating the establishment of Camp Crittenden.

Site information
- Type: Army post
- Controlled by: Arizona

Site history
- Built: 1867
- Built by: United States
- In use: 1867–1873
- Battles/wars: Apache Wars

Garrison information
- Occupants: United States Army

Fort Crittenden, originally Camp Crittenden, was a United States Army post built in 1867 three miles from Sonoita, Arizona along Sonoita Creek. It was established to campaign against the Apache and to protect American pioneers in the area.

== History ==
Fort Crittenden was established on August 10, 1867 at the head of Davidson Canyon, a half mile from the site of Fort Buchanan, which was built in 1856 and abandoned after the Battle of Fort Buchanan in 1865. The fort was named for Colonel Thomas L. Crittenden, who was the commander of the 5th Division in the Army of the Ohio at Shiloh, the Left Wing of the Army of the Cumberland at Stones River, and the XXI Corps at Chickamauga during the American Civil War. The fort was closed on June 1, 1873. Deteriorating adobe walls and dirt mounds mark the site which is on private property.
