= Fort Buchanan =

Fort Buchanan is the name of two United States Army forts:

- Fort Buchanan, Arizona, is a former United States Army base in Arizona to control land purchased in the Gadsden Purchase
- Fort Buchanan, Puerto Rico is the only active U.S. Army installation in the Caribbean, home of the 1st Mission Support Command.
