= Harshaw Creek =

Stream in Santa Cuz County, Arizona

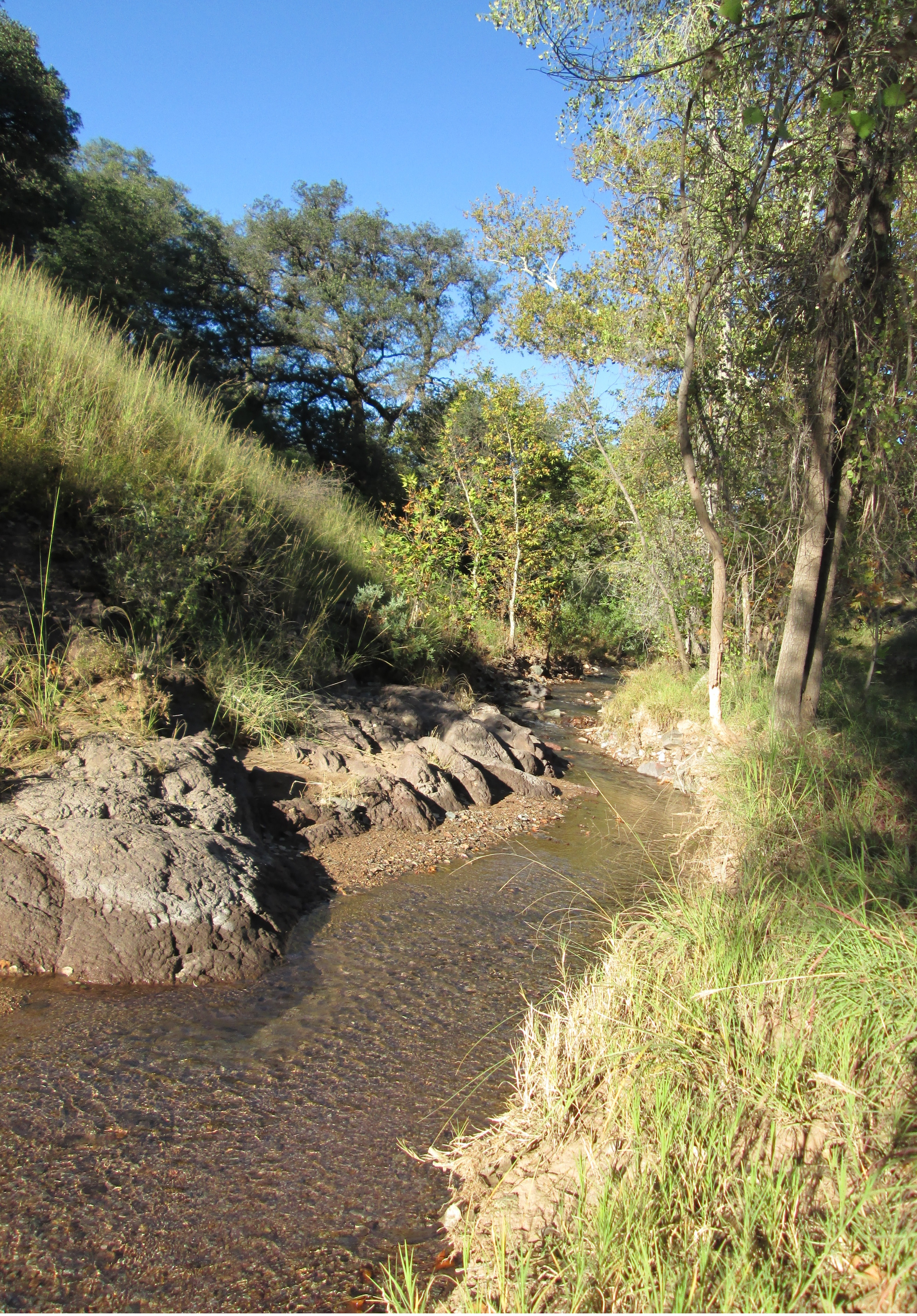
- Harshaw Creek, northeast of the Harshaw townsite

Location
- Country: United States
- State: Arizona
- County: Santa Cruz

Physical characteristics
- Source
  - location: Patagonia Mountains
- Mouth
  - location: Sonoita Creek, Patagonia, Arizona
  - coordinates: 31°32′36″N 110°44′43″W
  - elevation: 4,078 ft (1,243 m)
- Length: 15 mi (24 km)

Basin features
- River system: Colorado River

Harshaw Creek is a stream in the Patagonia Mountains of Santa Cruz County, Arizona, named after David Tecumseh Harshaw, who settled along its banks in the mid-1870s. It is approximately 15 miles (24 km) long and flows in a north to northwesterly direction toward the community of Patagonia, where it joins with Sonoita Creek.

Most of Harshaw Creek is ephemeral and experiences its greatest stream-flow after the summer monsoon and winter snowstorms. Vegetation is typical to the region with cottonwood, willow, sycamore and other lesser plants forming a riparian corridor along its banks. Upper Harshaw Creek flows through a narrow, steep-walled valley, which widens out into a sandy channel as it enters the Sonoita Valley a few miles south of Patagonia.

Much of Harshaw Creek is located within the Coronado National Forest and is available for recreational use. Several ranches are also located alongside the creek, although cattle grazing is limited. The creek and its tributaries were the center of extensive gold and silver mining activity beginning at the end of the 19th century and lasting well into the 20th century. As a result, there are multiple abandoned mines in the area, which are a significant source of pollution. Because of this, Harshaw Creek has a significantly higher pH level than other nearby streams.

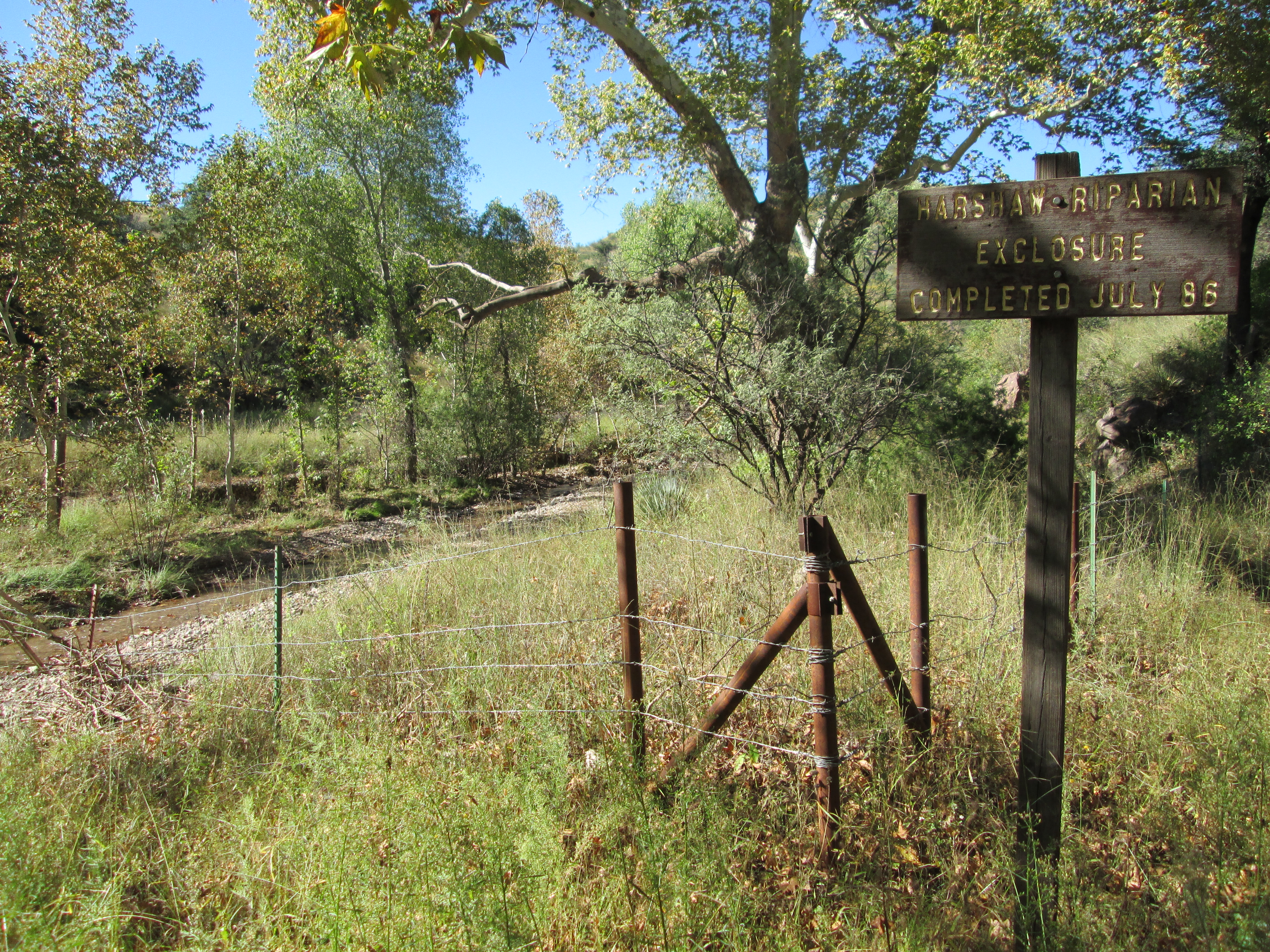
The Harshaw Riparian Exclosure, a small nature preserve

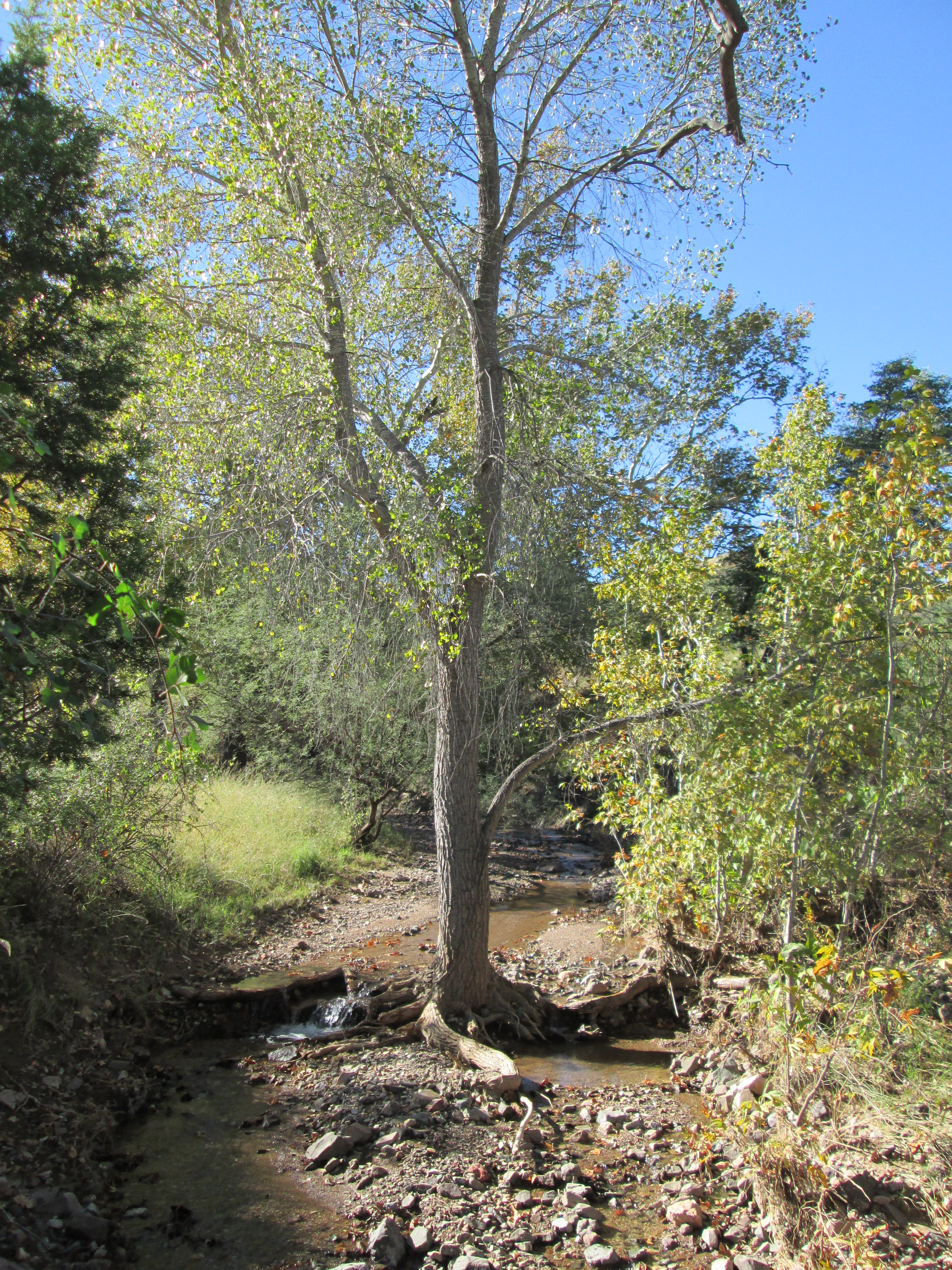
A cottonwood tree in Harshaw Creek

== See also ==
- Harshaw, Arizona
- List of rivers of Arizona
