= Bascom affair =

1861 confrontation between Apache Indians and the US Army

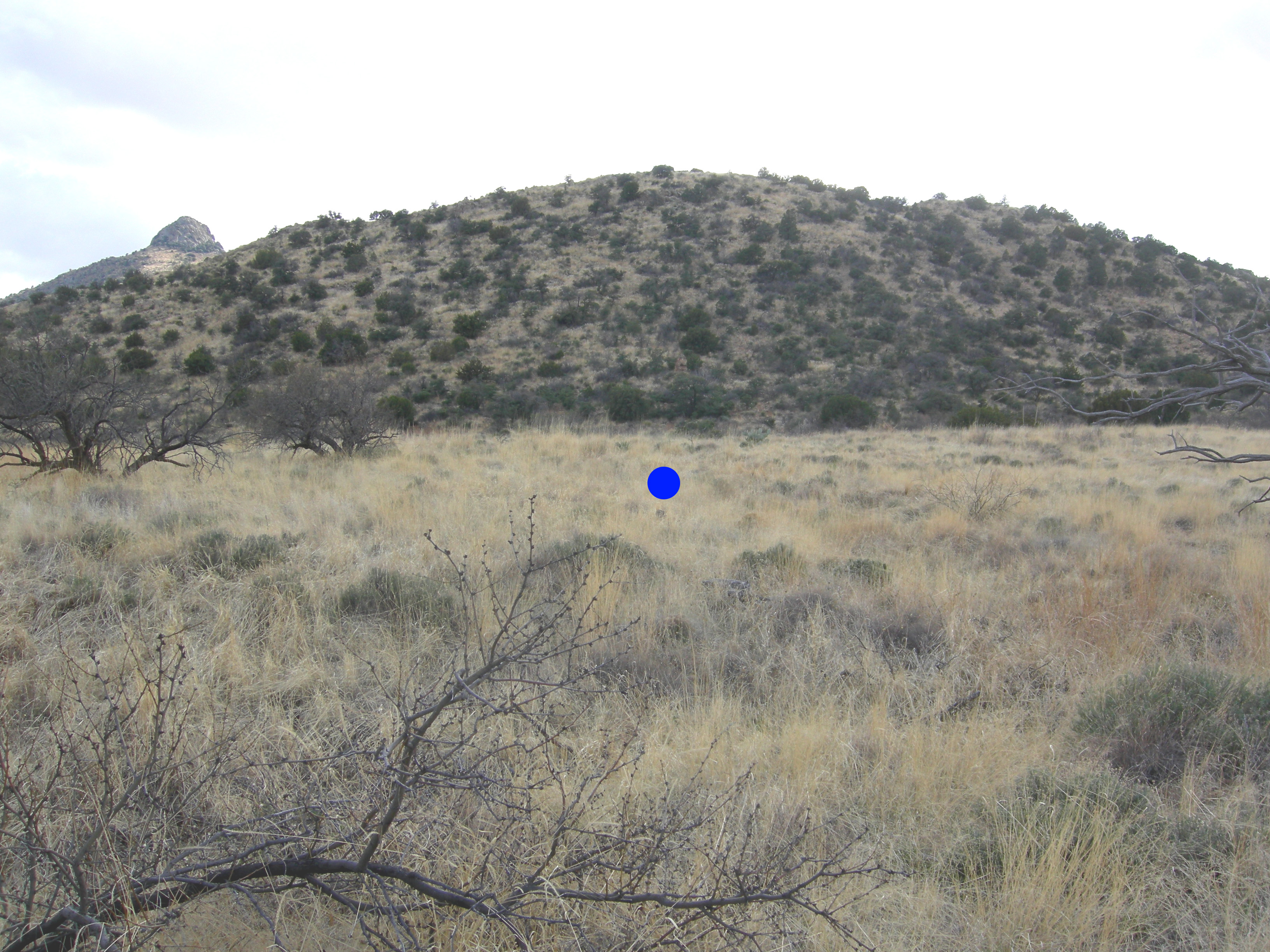
Blue dot represents where U.S. Army Lt. George N. Bascom met Apache leader Cochise in Apache Pass on February 5, 1861.

The Bascom Massacre was a confrontation between Apache Indians and the United States Army under Lt. George Nicholas Bascom in the Arizona Territory in early 1861. It has been considered to have directly precipitated the decades-long Apache Wars between the United States and several tribes in the southwestern United States. War was coming with the Chiricahua Apache. The affair led to an open break and open hostilities, but Cochise, the principal nantan of the Chokonen band of the Chiricahua Apache, had previously been peaceful and prudent and avoided raiding Americans. He had, however, stolen livestock from the Overland Mail, from Fort Buchanan and had twice been forced to return stolen stock by Capt. Richard S. Ewell, who swore that if he had to deal with Cochise again, he would strike a blow.

== Trigger ==
The Bascom affair began on January 27, 1861, when Tonto Apache parties raided the ranch of John Ward at Sonoita Creek, stealing several head of livestock and kidnapping Ward's 12-year-old stepson Felix Ward. Ward reported the raid to the nearby military authority, Lt. Col. Morrison, the commandant of Fort Buchanan, Arizona, who directed Lt. George Nicholas Bascom and a large group of infantry to attempt to recover the boy. Bascom and his men were unable to locate the boy or the tribe. Because Ward said the kidnappers had gone east towards the Chiricahua Mountains, it was assumed that the raid involved Chiricahua Apaches, which would have been a routine activity for local Apaches. It was later determined that Coyotero Apaches had actually been responsible for the kidnapping.

== Escalation ==
Morrison ordered Bascom to use whatever means necessary to punish the kidnappers and recapture the boy. Bascom, Ward and 54 soldiers journeyed east to Apache Pass, arriving on February 3, 1861, and met Sgt. Daniel Robinson, who would accompany them for the rest of the expedition. Bascom convinced a Chiricahua Apache leader named Cochise to meet with him. Suspicious of Bascom's intentions, Cochise brought with him his brother Coyuntwa, two nephews, his wife and his two children. At the meeting Cochise claimed he knew nothing of the raid. Doubting Cochise's honesty, Bascom attempted to imprison him and his family in a tent to be held hostage, but Cochise was able to escape alone by slashing a hole in the canvas wall.

Two days later, on February 5, Cochise delivered a message to Bascom asking for the release of his family, but Bascom refused and told Cochise that they "would be set free just so soon as the boy was released". The following day, Cochise and a large party of Apaches attacked a group of unaware American and Mexican teamsters. After torturing and killing the nine Mexicans, he took the three Americans hostage, offering them in exchange for his family, but Bascom maintained that he would accept nothing other than the return of the boy and cattle. On February 7, Cochise and his men attacked Bascom's soldiers while they were fetching water.

Cochise quickly fled with his hostages to Sonora, Mexico, which was outside American jurisdiction. On the way he tortured and killed the American prisoners and left their remains to be discovered by Bascom. Several days later, on February 19, 1861, Lt. Isaiah Moore, who had led a relief party of cavalry to Apache Pass, hanged Cochise's brother and nephews before he and his soldiers began their journey home.

== Aftermath ==
The moment when Cochise discovered his brother and nephews dead has been called the moment when the Indians (the Chiricahua in particular) transferred their hatred of the Mexicans to the Americans. Cochise's subsequent war of vengeance, in the form of numerous raids and murders, was the beginning of the 25-year-long Apache Wars.

This incident subsequently led to the awarding of the Medal of Honor (chronologically for the earliest action) to Dr. Bernard J.D. Irwin. Despite the medal being created during the Civil War, ex post facto awards for action taken before the medal's creation were authorized.

Felix Ward, the kidnapped boy, was later found living with the Coyotero Apaches and became an Apache Scout for the U.S. Army known by the name of Mickey Free.

== Historical fiction ==
- The Bascom affair is mentioned in the 1950 film Broken Arrow by James Stewart's character as several white men argue matters of right and wrong about the violence between Apaches and white settlers. The Battle at Apache Pass is a sequel, without James Stewart, that shows how the Bascom affair started.
- The conflict plays a central role in Jean-Michel Charlier and Jean Giraud's (a.k.a. Moebius) graphic novel series Blueberry, particularly in the first three episodes (Fort Navajo, Thunder in the West, and Lone Eagle, first published in French magazine Pilote between 1965 and 1967; English translations by Egmont/Methuen in 1977 and 1978). The plot and characters differ from the actual historic events (i.e. name of the kidnapped child, tribe of captors, rank of Bascom, name of fort, etc.).
- In the episode "Best Man for the Job" of the TV western series The High Chaparral (1967–1971), the Bascom affair is discussed between patriarch John Cannon and Captain Thomas Dabney regarding the Cannon ranch being under siege by Cochise.
- Mexican writer Álvaro Enrigue includes the episode in the second part of his novel Ahora me rindo y eso es todo (Anagrama, 2018).

== See also ==
- Apache Wars
- Apache Pass Station
- Butterfield Overland Mail in New Mexico Territory
