= George Nicholas Bascom =

US Army officer (1837–1862)

George Nicholas Bascom (1837 – February 21, 1862) was a United States Army officer in the New Mexico Territory and in the early months of the American Civil War.

== Biography ==
George N. Bascom was born in Owingsville in Bath County, Kentucky. His ancestors were of French Huguenot and French Basque. Bascom was appointed to the United States Military Academy at West Point, and graduated 26th in a class of 27 in 1858. Following his graduation he was first stationed at Camp Floyd in Utah Territory and then in New Mexico Territory at Fort Buchanan as a 2nd Lieutenant of the U.S. 7th Infantry Regiment. In January 1861 he was involved in what became known as the Bascom Affair at Apache Pass, that is considered to be the key event in triggering the 1861–1872 Apache War.

After the American Civil War began, Bascom was promoted to captain of the U.S. 16th Infantry Regiment. However, before he could return to join his new regiment, the three companies of the 7th Infantry that had moved to Fort Craig were involved in the Battle of Val Verde in New Mexico Territory. Bascom was killed in action by Confederate forces on February 21, 1862, during the battle. Subsequently, Fort Bascom, New Mexico, was named in his honor.

Captain Bascom was originally buried at nearby Fort Craig, in the post cemetery. When Fort Craig was closed in 1885, all the bodies were reburied at the Santa Fe National Cemetery. Bascom's burial was unidentifiable and is believed to be one of the unknown markers.

The actor Dick Simmons portrayed Bascom in the 1966 episode, "The Hero of Apache Pass", on the syndicated television anthology series, Death Valley Days.

== See also ==
- Apache Pass Station
- Butterfield Overland Mail in New Mexico Territory
