= Fort Buchanan, Arizona =

Former US Army post

Fort Buchanan
- Sonoita Creek, Arizona
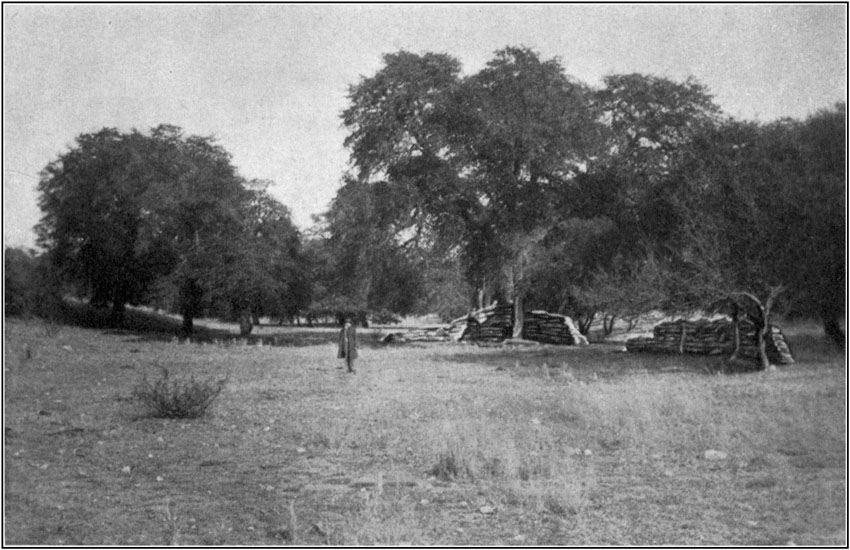
- The ruins of Fort Buchanan in 1914

Site information
- Type: U.S. Army post
- Controlled by: Arizona
- Condition: Tourist attraction

Location
- Coordinates: 31°39′27″N 110°42′25″W

Site history
- Built: 1856
- Built by: United States
- In use: 1856–1865
- Battles/wars: Apache Wars: Battle of Fort Buchanan

Garrison information
- Past commanders: (United States) Michael Buckley
- Occupants: United States Army

Fort Buchanan was a US Army post founded in 1856 three miles southwest of present-day Sonoita in Santa Cruz County, Arizona, on the east slope of what is now called Hog Canyon. At the time, the area was under constant threat from hostile Apaches. Full-scale war with the local Chiricahua Apache was initiated by the Bascom affair in early 1861, during which Lieutenant George Nicholas Bascom and his patrol were based at Fort Buchanan.

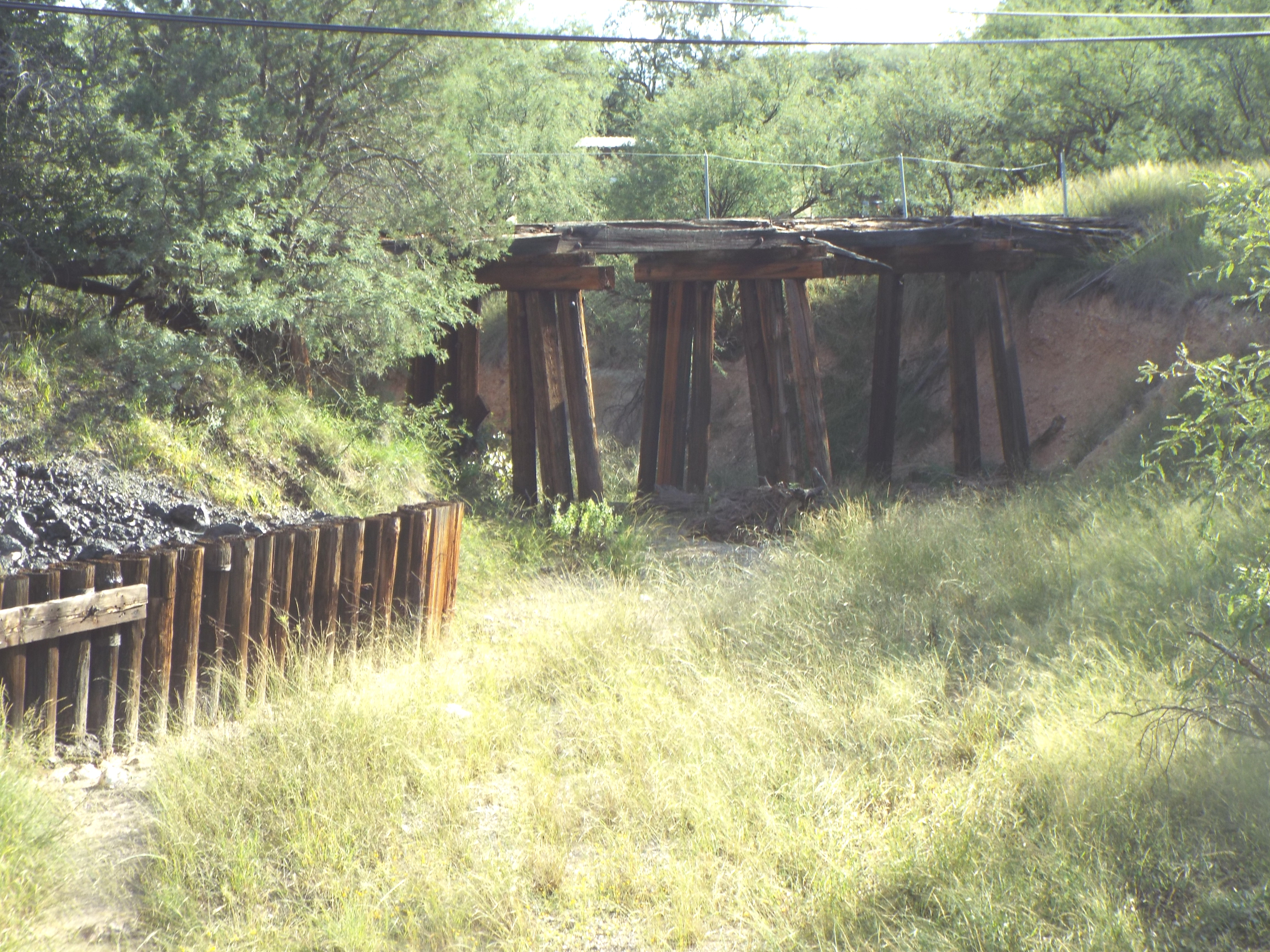
Fort Buchanan Bridge ruins

The post was officially abandoned in 1861, though troops of the California Column occasionally manned the post during the American Civil War. In February 1865, Apaches attacked and burned the fort in the Battle of Fort Buchanan, forcing the small garrison to retreat. It was then abandoned for good, and Fort Crittenden was established half a mile east on the flats in 1867.

After having been lost for years, the ruins of the fort were rediscovered in 1929 by Harry J. Karns, mayor of Nogales, Arizona, and Arizona Superior Court Judge W. A. O'Connor.
