= Sonoita, Arizona =

CDP in Santa Cruz County, Arizona

- Census-designated place
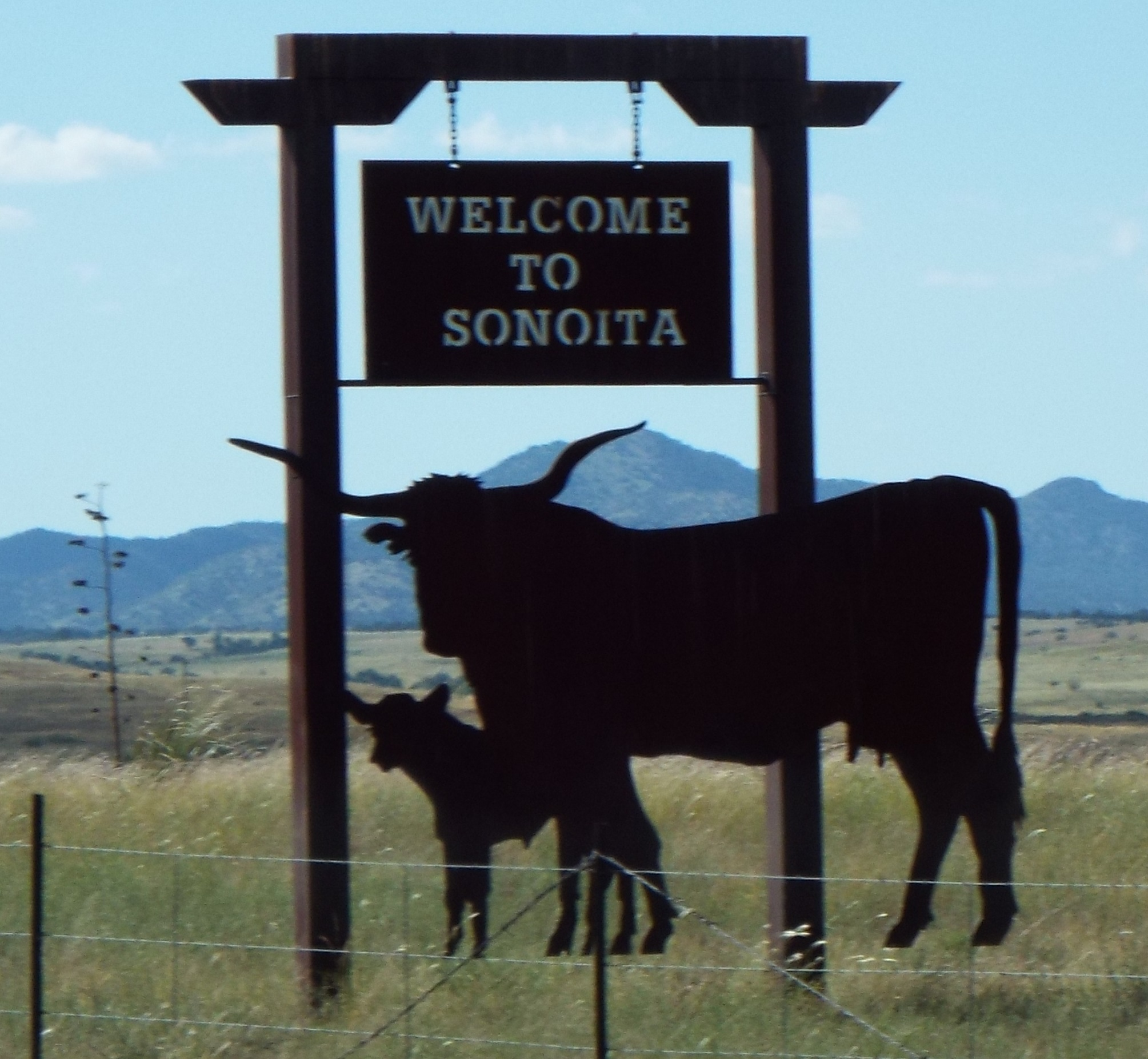
- Welcome to Sonoita

- Location in Santa Cruz County and the state of Arizona
- Coordinates: 31°40′46″N 110°39′19″W
- Country: United States
- State: Arizona
- County: Santa Cruz

Area
  - Total: 10.64 sq mi (27.56 km^{2})
  - Land: 10.64 sq mi (27.55 km^{2})
  - Water: 0.0039 sq mi (0.01 km^{2})
- Elevation: 4,885 ft (1,489 m)

Population (2020)
  - Total: 803
  - Density: 75.5/sq mi (29.14/km^{2})
- Time zone: UTC-7 (MST (no DST))
- ZIP code: 85637
- Area code: 520
- FIPS code: 04-68220
- GNIS feature ID: 34635

Sonoita (/səˈnɔɪ.tə/; O'odham: Ṣon ʼOidag) is a census-designated place (CDP) in Santa Cruz County, Arizona, United States. The population was 803 at the 2020 census.

The origin of the name of the CDP is the O'odham Ṣon ʼOidag, which may be best translated as "spring field".

== Geography ==
Sonoita is located in northern Santa Cruz County. The community is at the intersection of Arizona State Route 83 and Arizona State Route 82. The Santa Rita Mountains and the Canelo Hills lie to the west and southwest respectively. The headwaters of Sonoita Creek are just west of the site.

Historic Fort Crittenden and Fort Buchanan lie approximately four miles west of Sonoita, just north of Sonoita Creek and Route 82.

According to the United States Census Bureau, the CDP has a total area of 10.5 square miles (27.3 km^{2}), all land.

== Demographics ==
Historical population
Census	Pop.	Note	%±
2000	826		—
2010	818		−1.0%
2020	803		−1.8%
U.S. Decennial Census

As of the census of 2000, there were 826 people, 358 households, and 264 families residing in the CDP. The population density was 18.1 inhabitants per square mile (7.0/km^{2}). There were 401 housing units at an average density of 8.8 per square mile (3.4/km^{2}). The racial makeup of the CDP was 89.6% White, 0.5% Black or African American, 0.5% Native American, 0.1% Asian, 0.2% Pacific Islander, 6.5% from other races, and 2.5% from two or more races. 16.7% of the population were Hispanic or Latino of any race.

There were 358 households, out of which 20.7% had children under the age of 18 living with them, 66.2% were married couples living together, 5.9% had a female householder with no husband present, and 26.0% were non-families. 21.5% of all households were made up of individuals, and 8.4% had someone living alone who was 65 years of age or older. The average household size was 2.3 and the average family size was 2.7.

In the CDP, the population was spread out, with 18.4% under the age of 18, 2.5% from 18 to 24, 21.2% from 25 to 44, 37.7% from 45 to 64, and 20.2% who were 65 years of age or older. The median age was 50 years. For every 100 females, there were 92.5 males. For every 100 females age 18 and over, there were 90.4 males.

The median income for a household in the CDP was $51,310, and the median income for a family was $58,571. Males had a median income of $46,042 versus $26,406 for females. The per capita income for the CDP was $27,312. About 2.8% of families and 4.9% of the population were below the poverty line, including 10.1% of those under age 18 and 2.0% of those age 65 or over.

== Notable residents ==
- Alex Flanagan, sports journalist
- Mark Wystrach, musician, member of country band Midland
- Rick Renzi, U.S. Congressman, owner Rainwhisper Ranch.

== Images ==
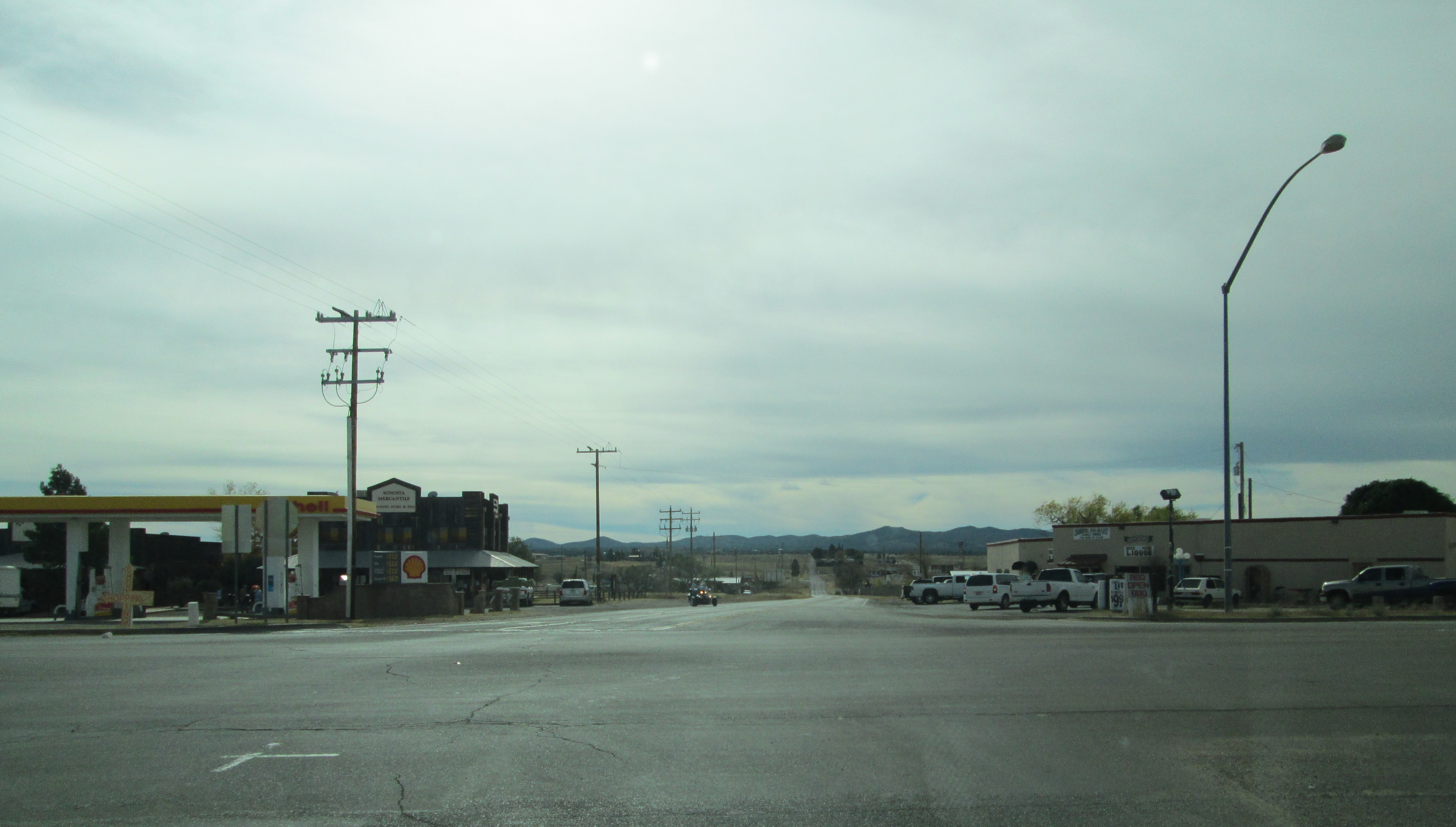
Sonoita, as seen from the main intersection in town.

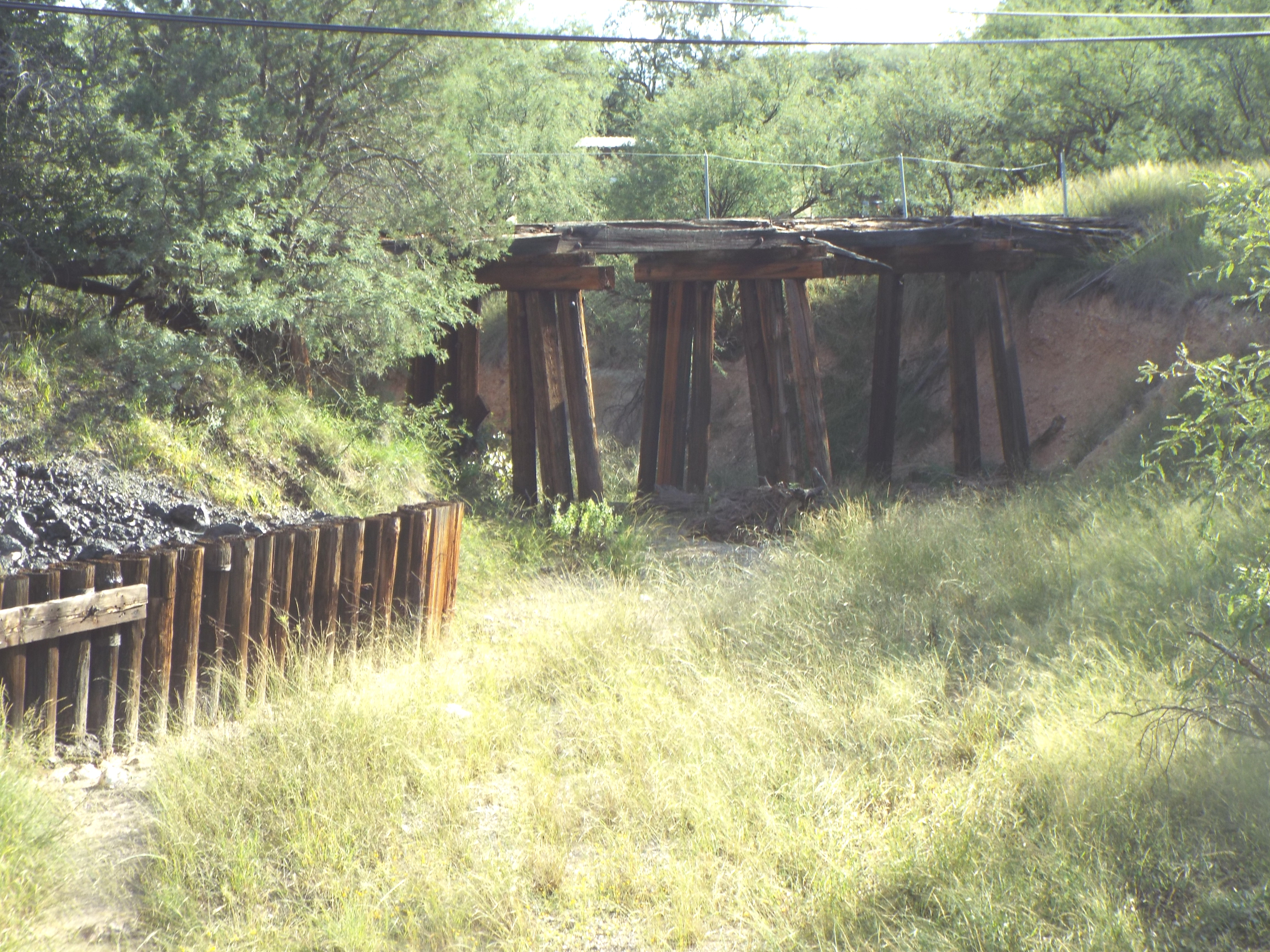
Ruins of the Fort Buchanan Bridge over Sonoita Creek

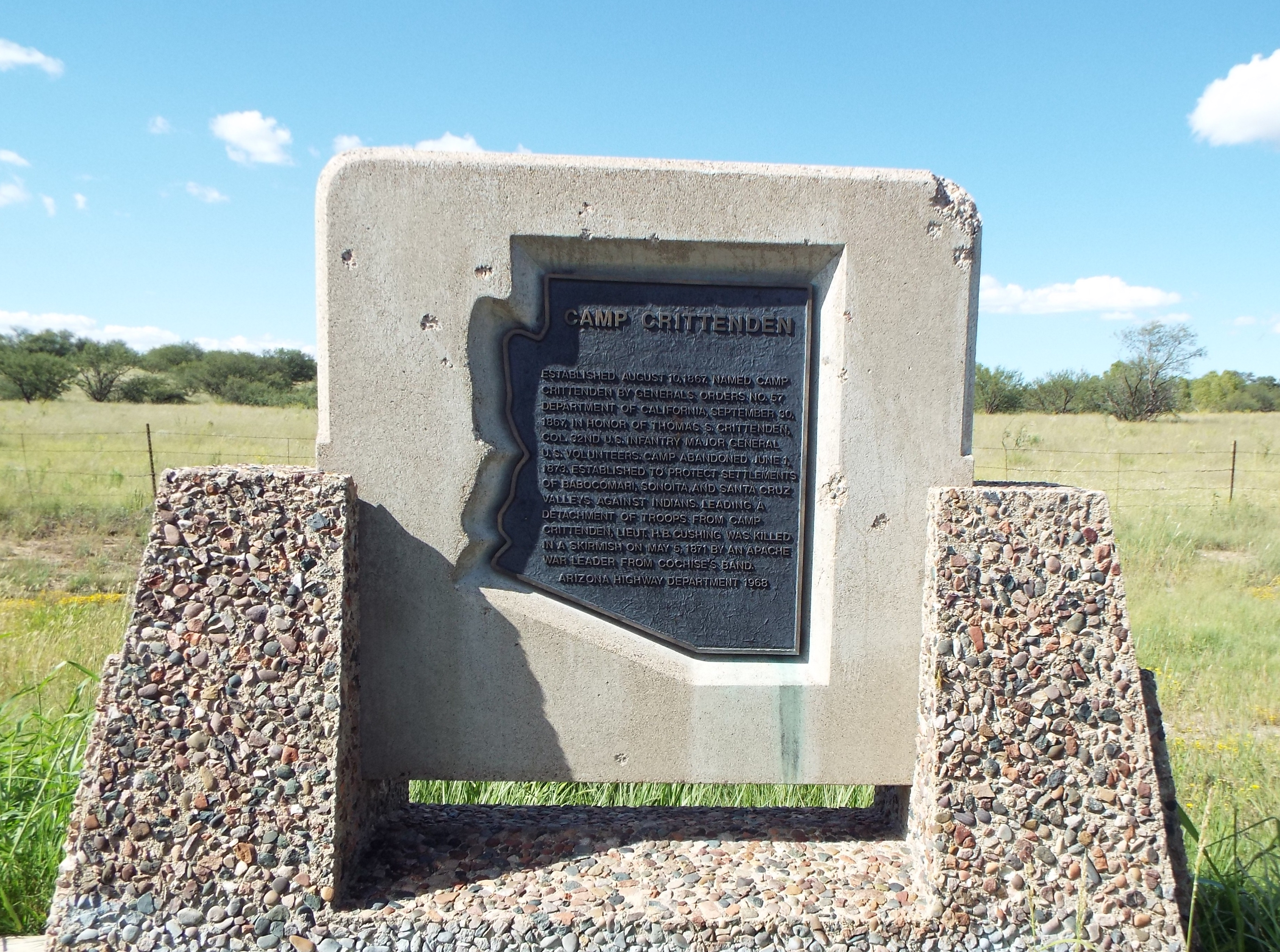
Camp (Fort) Crittenden Marker historic marker

== See also ==
- Sonoita Creek
- Sonoita AVA, Arizona wine region around Sonoita
- Santa Rita Abbey in Sonoita
- Empire Ranch
- Fort Buchanan, Arizona
