= Sonoita Creek =

Waterway in Santa Cruz County, Arizona

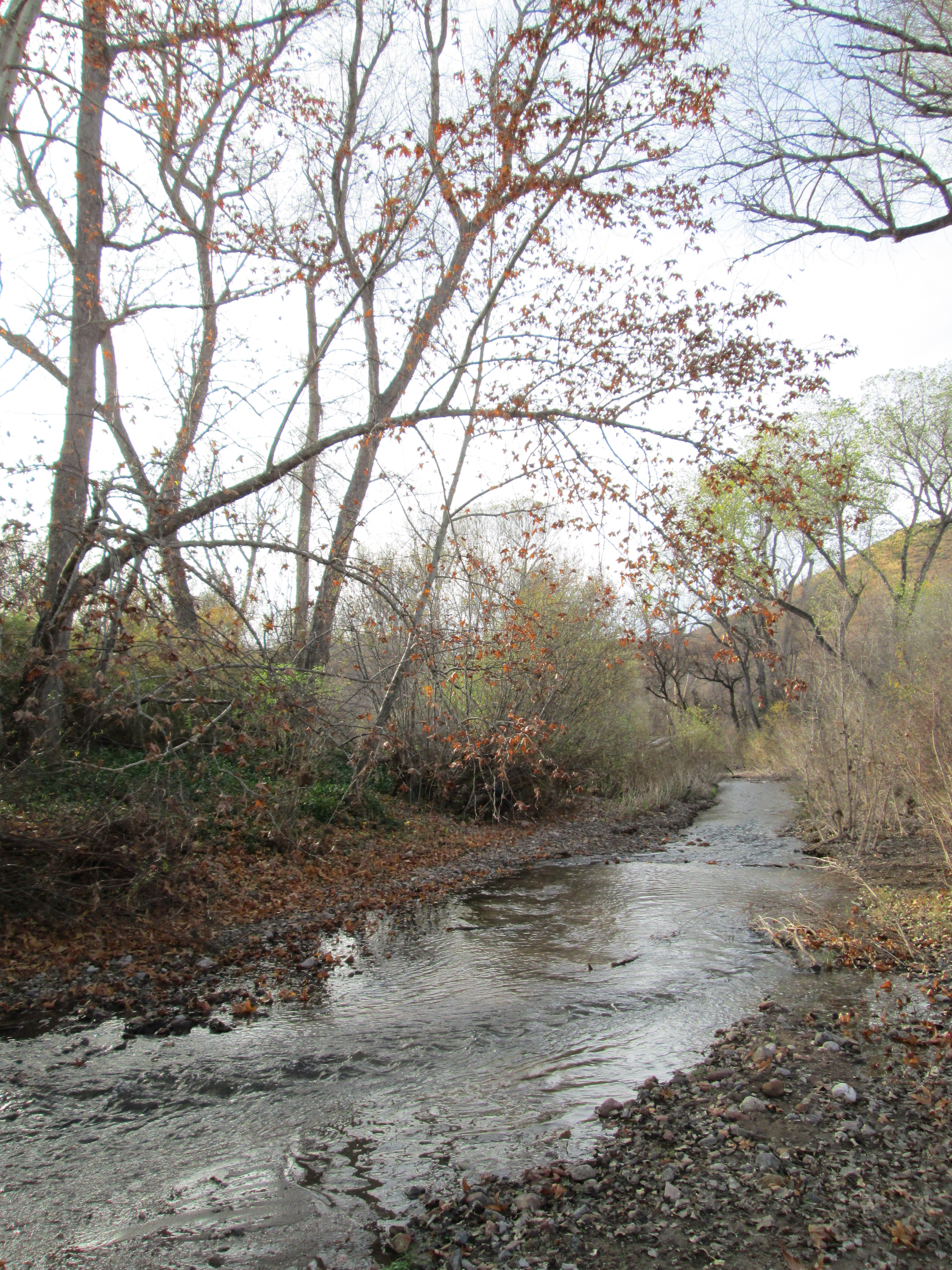
- Sonoita Creek, facing downstream from Salero Road

Location
- Country: United States
- State: Arizona
- County: Santa Cruz

Physical characteristics
- Source
  - location: Two miles northwest of Sonoita
  - coordinates: 31°41′36″N 110°41′20″W
  - elevation: 5000 ft
- Mouth
  - location: Santa Cruz River, Rio Rico, Arizona
  - coordinates: 31°27′41″N 110°58′45″W
  - elevation: 3435 ft
- Length: 31 mi (50 km)

Basin features
- River system: Colorado River
- Tributaries
  - left: Harshaw Creek

Sonoita Creek is a tributary stream of the Santa Cruz River in Santa Cruz County, Arizona. It originates near and takes its name from the abandoned Pima mission in the high valley near Sonoita. It flows steadily for the first 15 miles (24 km) of its westward course past Patagonia, its bird sanctuary and Patagonia Lake, but sinks beneath the sand seven to eight miles (11 to 13 km) before joining the Santa Cruz River a few miles north of Nogales. This confluence provides water for Tumacácori and Tubac and collects in the marsh lands around San Xavier del Bac downstream, to the north. The Santa Rita Mountains lie to the north and the Canelo Hills, Red Mountain and the Patagonia Mountains lie to the south. Harshaw Creek is a southern tributary which joins the Sonoita near Patagonia. Harshaw Creek drains the area between the Patagonia Mountains to the west and the high San Rafael Valley grasslands to the east. The ghost town of Harshaw lies within its watershed.

Sonoita Creek contains black bullhead, red shiner, mosquitofish, crayfish, American bullfrogs, largemouth bass, Gila topminnows, speckled dace, longfin dace, Sonora suckers, and desert suckers.

The New Mexico and Arizona Railroad paralleled the Sonoita Creek for a portion of the railroad's route. The route ran from a connection with the Southern Pacific Railroad in Benson, then south to Fairbank (about 13 km or 8 miles west of Tombstone) then west to Sonoita – Patagonia and Rio Rico, then south to Nogales. The railroad was constructed in 1881–82 and was abandoned in five phases between 1927 and 1962. Only 15.74 km (9.78 mi) of track remains in place today, from Rio Rico to Nogales, and is operated by the Union Pacific Railroad.

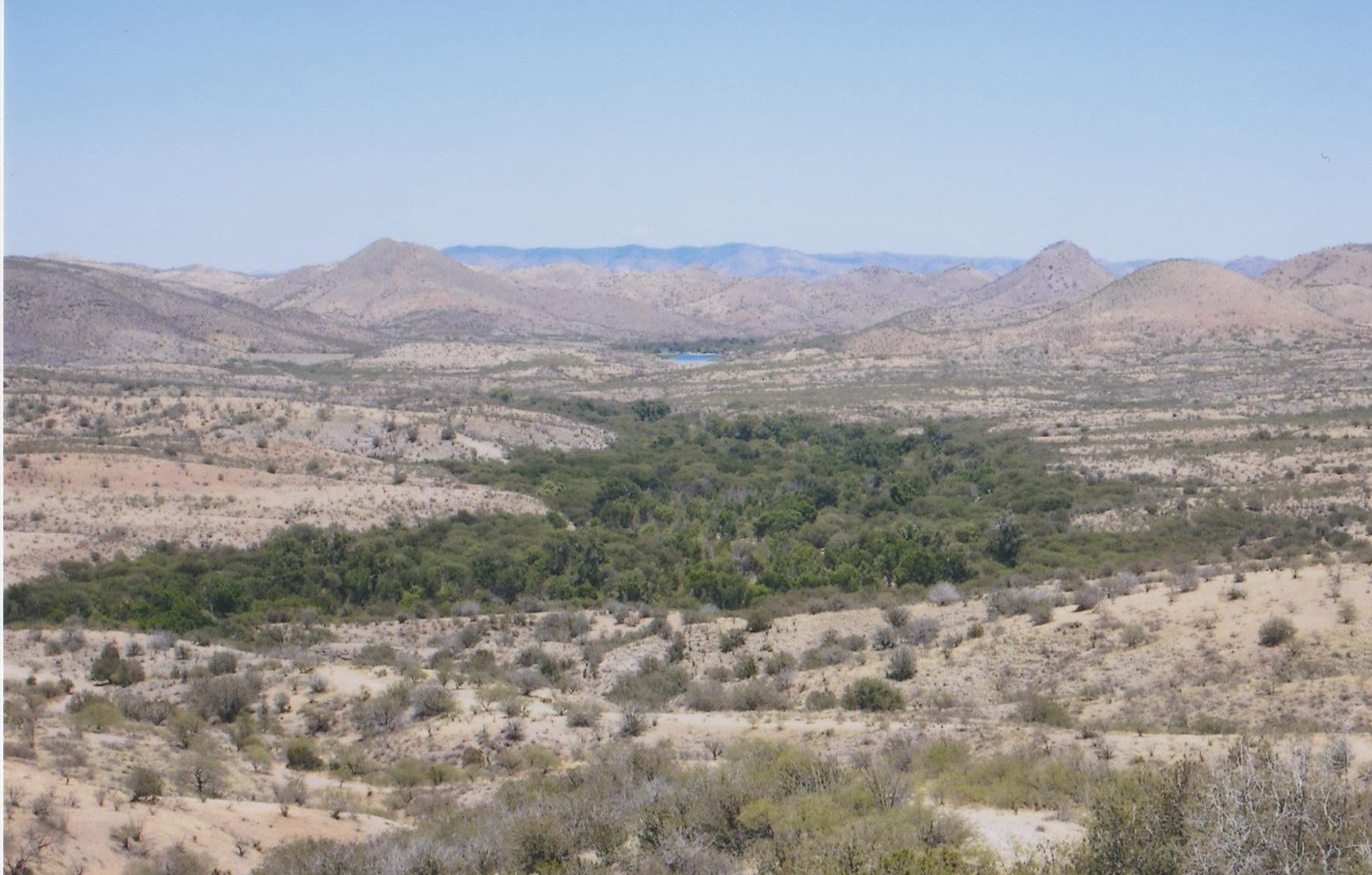
Riparian forest along Sonoita Creek, southwest of Patagonia Lake

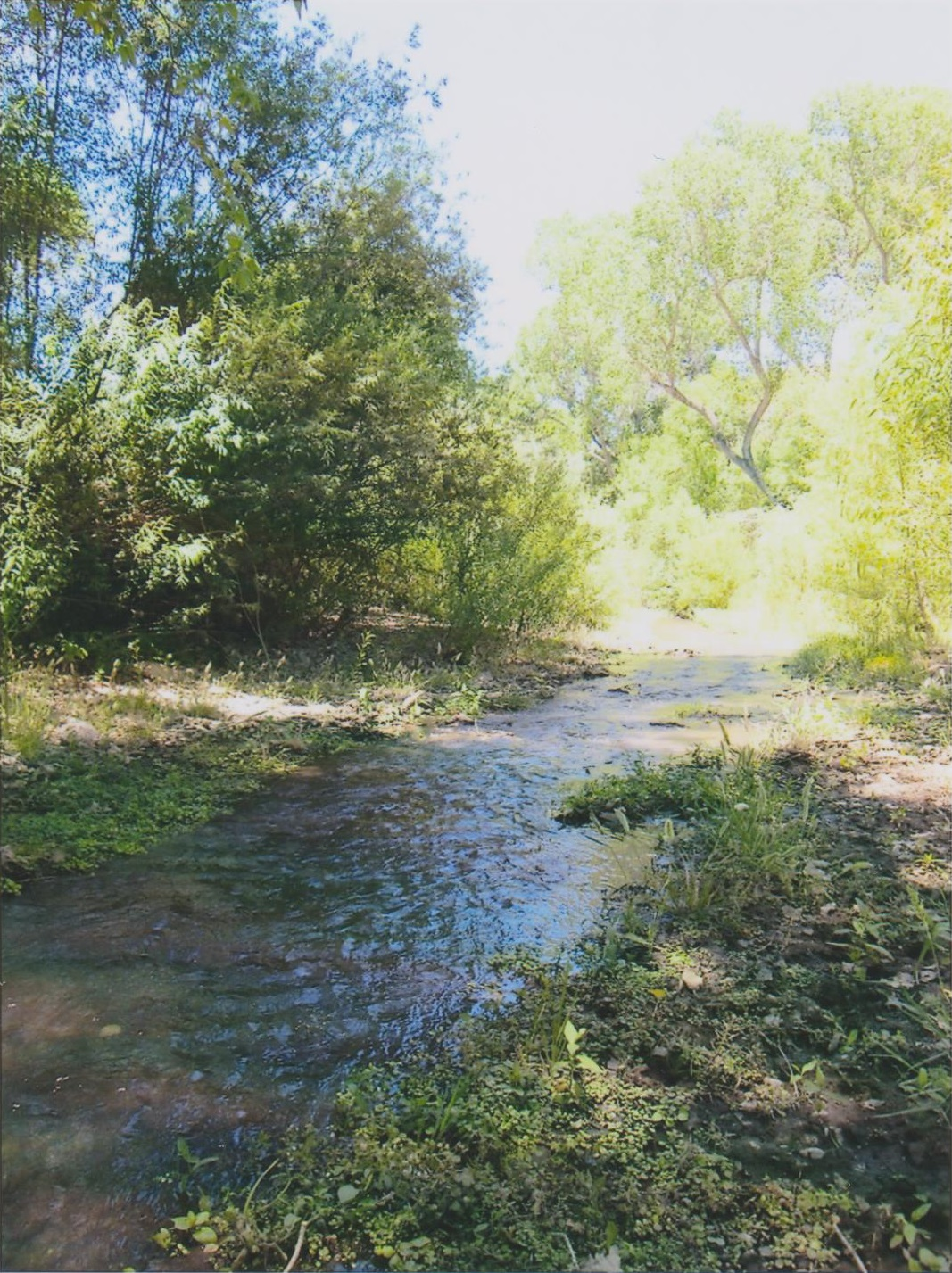
Sonoita Creek in the summer of 2014

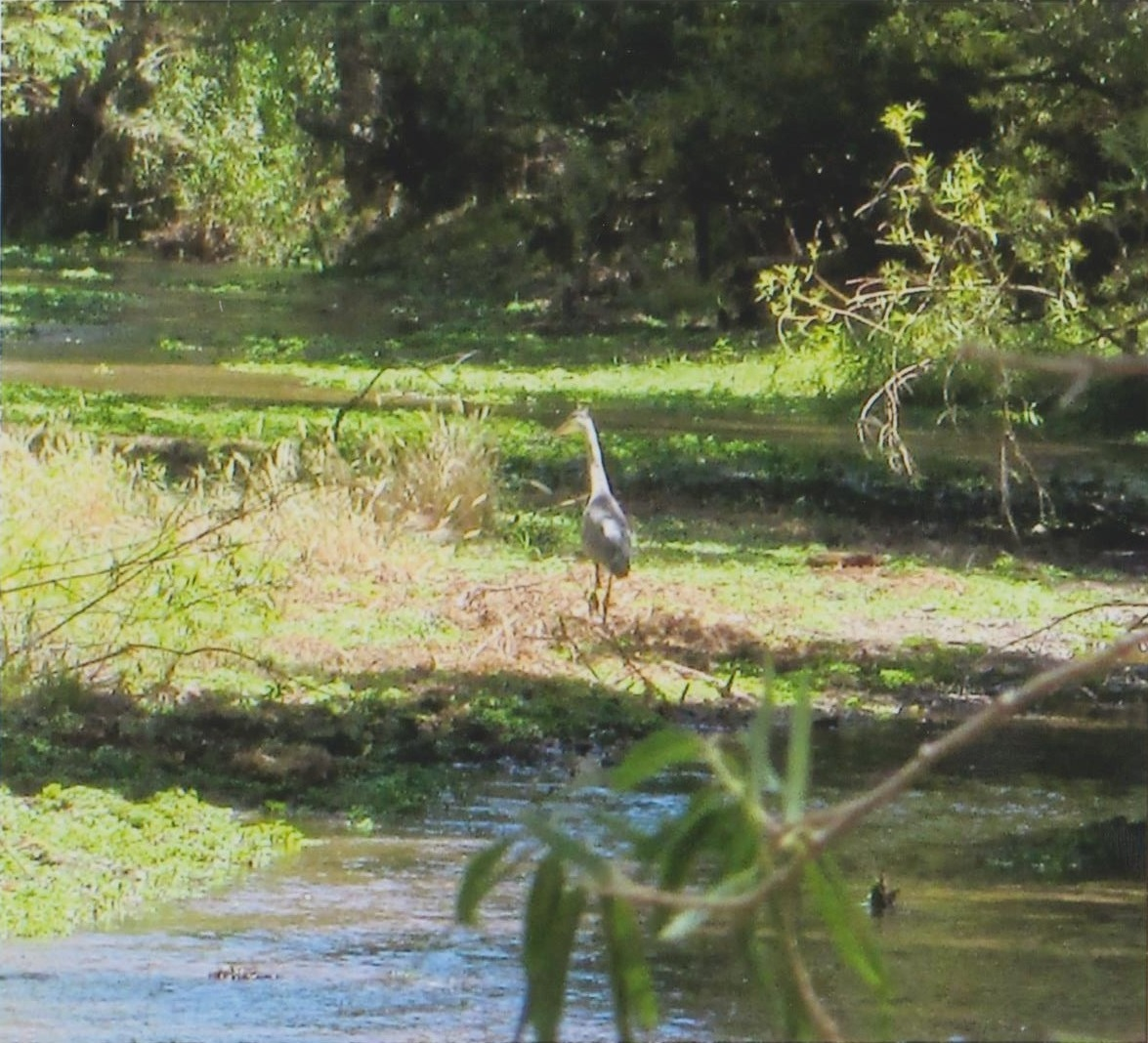
A great blue heron walking along Sonoita Creek

== See also ==
- List of Arizona rivers
