= Canelo (disambiguation) =

Canelo Álvarez (Santos Saúl Álvarez, born 1990) is a Mexican professional boxer.

Canelo may also refer to:

== Geography ==
- Canelo, Arizona, a ghost town
  - Canelo Ranger Station
  - Canelo School
- Canelo Hills in Arizona
  - Canelo Hills Cienega Reserve, a protected area

== Animals and plants ==
- Canelo (dog), a Spanish dog who is noted for his unwavering loyalty to his dead owner
- Canelo (moth), a moth genus in the geometer moth subfamily Nacophorini
- Canelo (tree), the common name for the tree Drimys winteri, native to Chile and Argentina
- Canelo ladies tresses orchid, common name of the orchid Spiranthes delitescens

== Publishing ==
- Canelo (publisher), a British book publisher

== See also ==
- Canelos, a rural parish in Pastaza Province, Ecuador
- El Canelo (disambiguation)
