= El Canelo =

El Canelo may refer to

- Canelo, a ship that sank as result of the 1960 Valdivia earthquake in Chile
- "El Canelo", a song by Los Lobos on their 1988 album: La Pistola y El Corazón

== See also ==
- Canelo (disambiguation)
