= Lowell Ranger Station =

- U.S. National Register of Historic Places
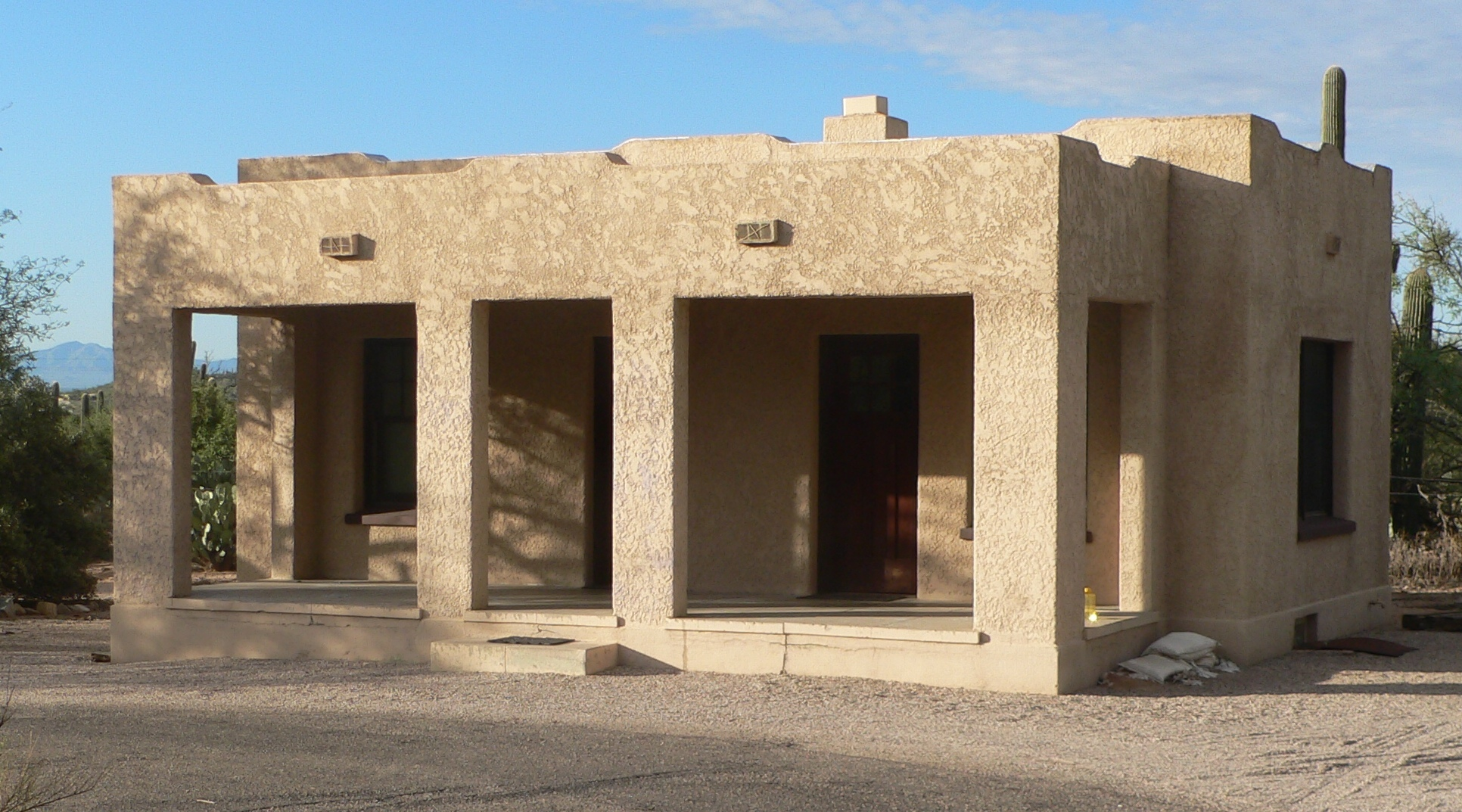
- Office building at ranger station, Coronado National Forest

- Location within Arizona Location within the United States
- Nearest city: Tucson, Pima County, Arizona
- Coordinates: 32°18′39″N 110°49′4″W
- Area: 2 acres (0.81 ha)
- Built: 1934
- Architect: USDA Forest Service
- Architectural style: Pueblo Revival
- MPS: Depression-Era USDA Forest Service Administrative Complexes in Arizona MPS
- NRHP reference No.: 93000529
- Added to NRHP: June 10, 1993

The Lowell Ranger Station compound is in the Coronado National Forest of southern Arizona, United States. It is located in Pima County, near Tucson.

== History ==
The ranger station buildings were built in 1934 by the Civilian Conservation Corps. It was designed by USDA Forest Service.

National Register of Historic Places listing

It was listed on the National Register of Historic Places (NRHP) in 1993 for its architecture, which includes Pueblo Revival and other styles.

The NRHP listing includes the government housing and the office space in three contributing buildings, the office, barn/garage, and house, located on 2 acres (0.81 ha). They were built by the CCC – Civilian Conservation Corps.

It was deemed significant "for its association with the expansion of Forest Service administration from custodial superintendence to active resource management", as well as for embodying "the use of standard plan architecture developed in the 1930s by Regional Office architects" and representing "a distinctive Forest Service architectural design style and philosophy." It was part of the Depression-Era USDA Forest Service Administrative Complexes in Arizona MPS (Multiple Property Submission) of the National Park Service in 1989.

== See also ==
- National Register of Historic Places listings in Pima County, Arizona
- Canelo Ranger Station
- CCC – Civilian Conservation Corps projects in Arizona
- Coronado National Forest topics
