= Canelo Ranger Station =

Historic place in Arizona, United States

- U.S. National Register of Historic Places
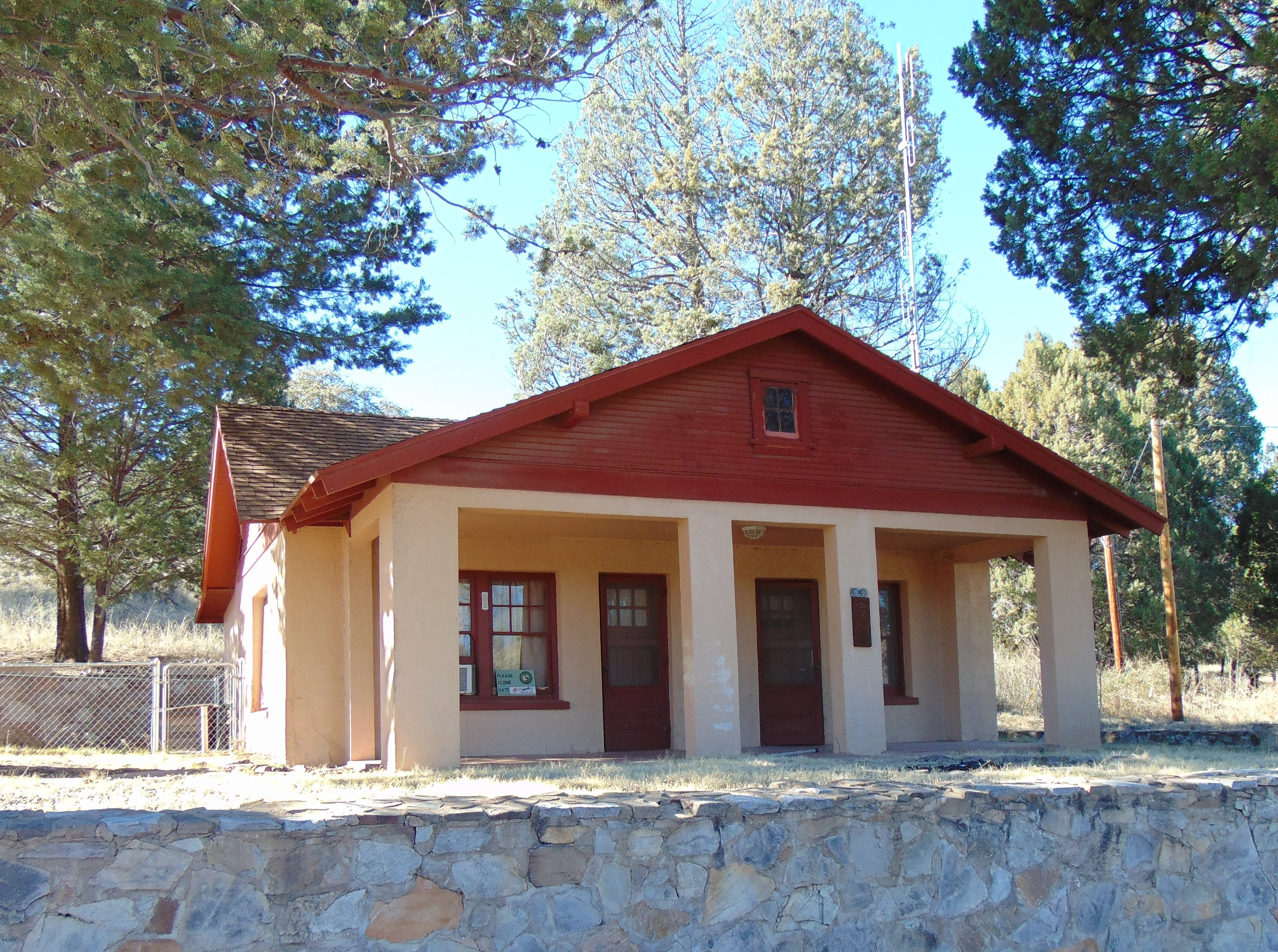
- Canelo Ranger Station office building.

- Location within Arizona Location within the United States
- Location: Canelo, Santa Cruz County, Arizona
- Coordinates: 31°33′5″N 110°30′59″W
- Area: 3 acres (1.2 ha)
- Built: 1932-33
- Architect: United States Forest Service (USFS)
- Architectural style: Bungalow/Craftsman
- MPS: Depression-Era USDA Forest Service Administrative Complexes in Arizona MPS
- NRHP reference No.: 93000513
- Added to NRHP: June 10, 1993

Canelo Ranger Station, also known as Canelo Work Station, is a historic ranger station in the Coronado National Forest, within Santa Cruz County of southern Arizona. It is located in the ghost town of Canelo, within a small valley between the Canelo Hills on the west and the northern Huachuca Mountains on the east.

It was built by the United States Forest Service (USFS) and the Civilian Conservation Corps (CCC) in the early-1930s. It was listed on the National Register of Historic Places in 1993 for its American Craftsman and Bungalow style architecture. The listing includes five contributing buildings on a 3-acre (1.2 ha) property, designed by USFS architects in Bungalow/Craftsman style.

== History ==
Construction of the Canelo Ranger Station began in November 1932, before the establishment of the CCC, which was responsible for building and improving many of Arizona's ranger stations and park sites during the Depression era.

Work was first started on a new adobe house for the rangers by Forest Service workers. During excavations for the construction of the basement, workers unearthed a redwood coffin containing the remains of local pioneer Captain Joe Parks. Parks had settled in the Canelo area in 1882. After the coffin's removal, concrete was poured to form the basement, which was finished in early December 1932, when work ceased for the winter.

On June 16, 1933, it was reported that the construction of the Canelo Ranger Station complex was finished with the completion of a small adobe barn, made from scrap materials salvaged from an older ranger station house. In addition to the residence and barn, a new office building, a three-bay garage and a small pumphouse along nearby Turkey Creek were also constructed, all of adobe brick. The office is identical in plan to the Patagonia and Lowell Ranger Station offices, but instead of a flat adobe roof common to desert settings, it features a wooden gabled roof, meant to fit in with the surrounding woodland environment.

Not long after the establishment of the Canelo Ranger Station, the CCC arrived and was put to work building the stone retaining walls around the office and residence, improving the roads, landscaping, and building corrals.

== National Register of Historic Places listing ==
The station is considered to be a good representation of a USFS administrative complex from the Depression era, and is also significant for its association with the expansion of the USFS from a custodial superintendence role to active resource management, which continues to the present day. The retaining walls are still intact, along with most of the rest of the station, which has changed very little over the years. Although a few additions and other minor modifications have been made, the overall appearance of the station remains very much like it did when it was first built in the 1930s.

=== Contributing buildings ===
The following are the contributing buildings listed on the National Register of Historic Places:

- Office: Bungalow/Craftsman style adobe building with two entrances, two offices and a bathroom
- Residence: Bungalow/Craftsman style adobe building with two bedrooms, a bathroom, living room, kitchen, dining room and basement
- Garage: Long adobe building with a wooden gabled roof, one entrance and three bays
- Barn: Small adobe building with a wooden gabled roof, next to horse corral
- Pumphouse: Small adobe building with a wooden gabled roof, now used for storage

== See also ==
- Canelo School
- Lowell Ranger Station
- National Register of Historic Places listings in Santa Cruz County, Arizona

== Gallery ==
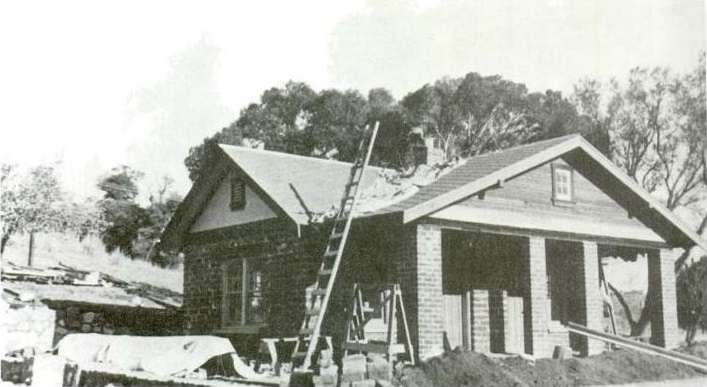
Construction of the Canelo Ranger Station office building (1933).

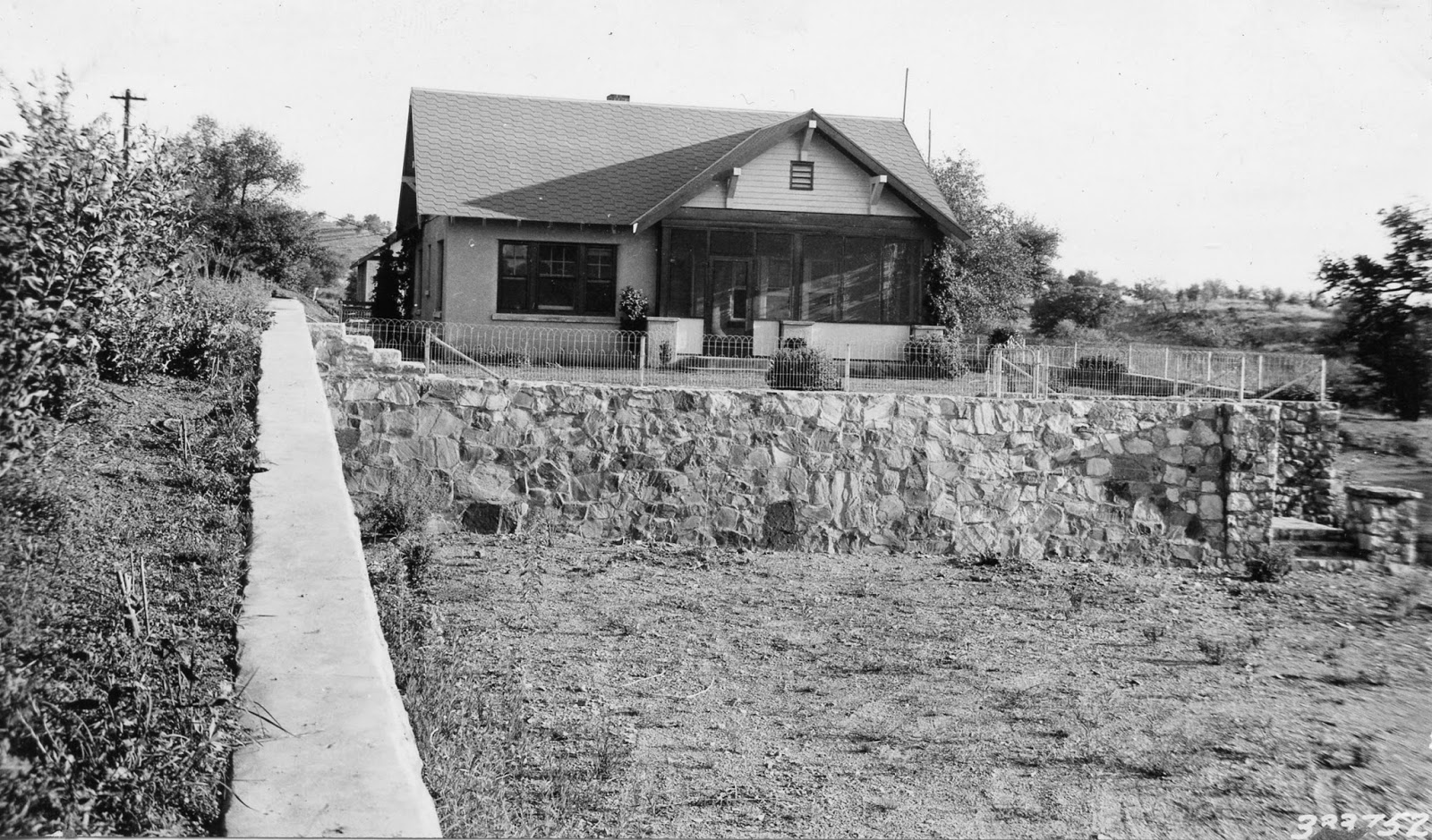
CCC photo of the ranger station residence (c.1933).

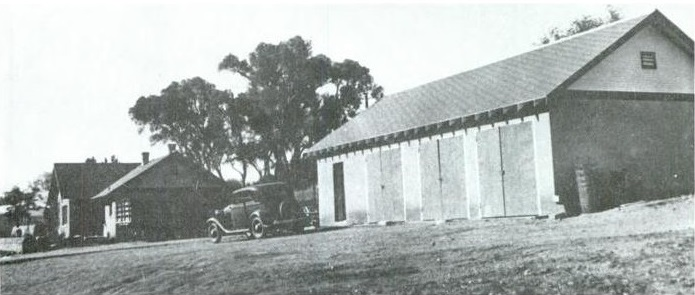
The residence (left) and the garage (1930s).

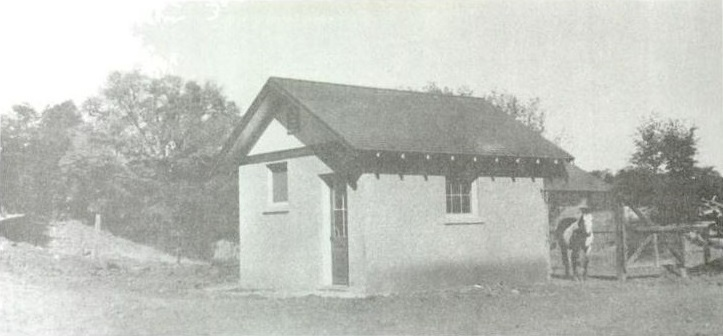
The small barn next to a horse corral (1930s).

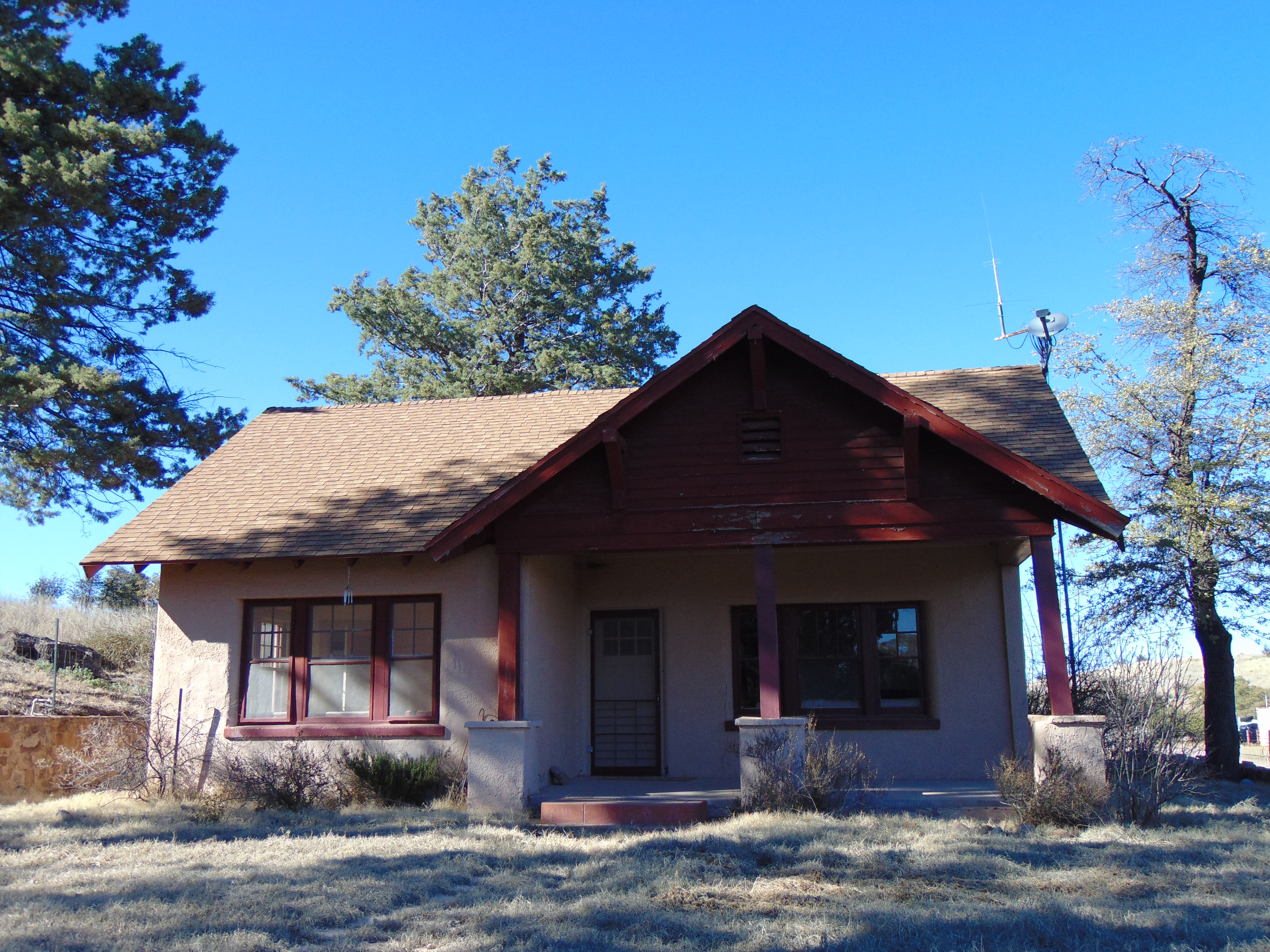
Ranger station residence (2015).

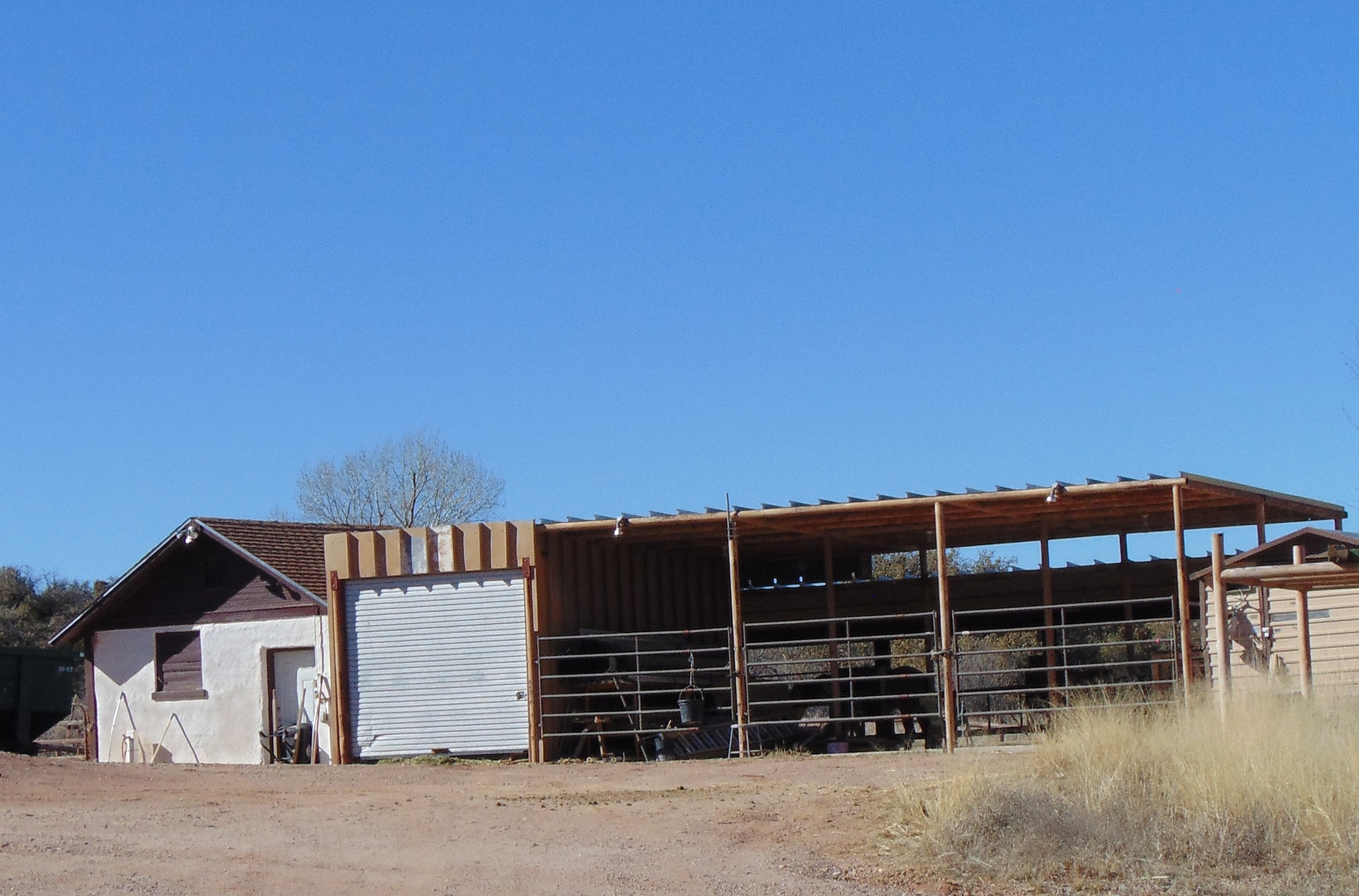
The barn and the horse corral (2015).

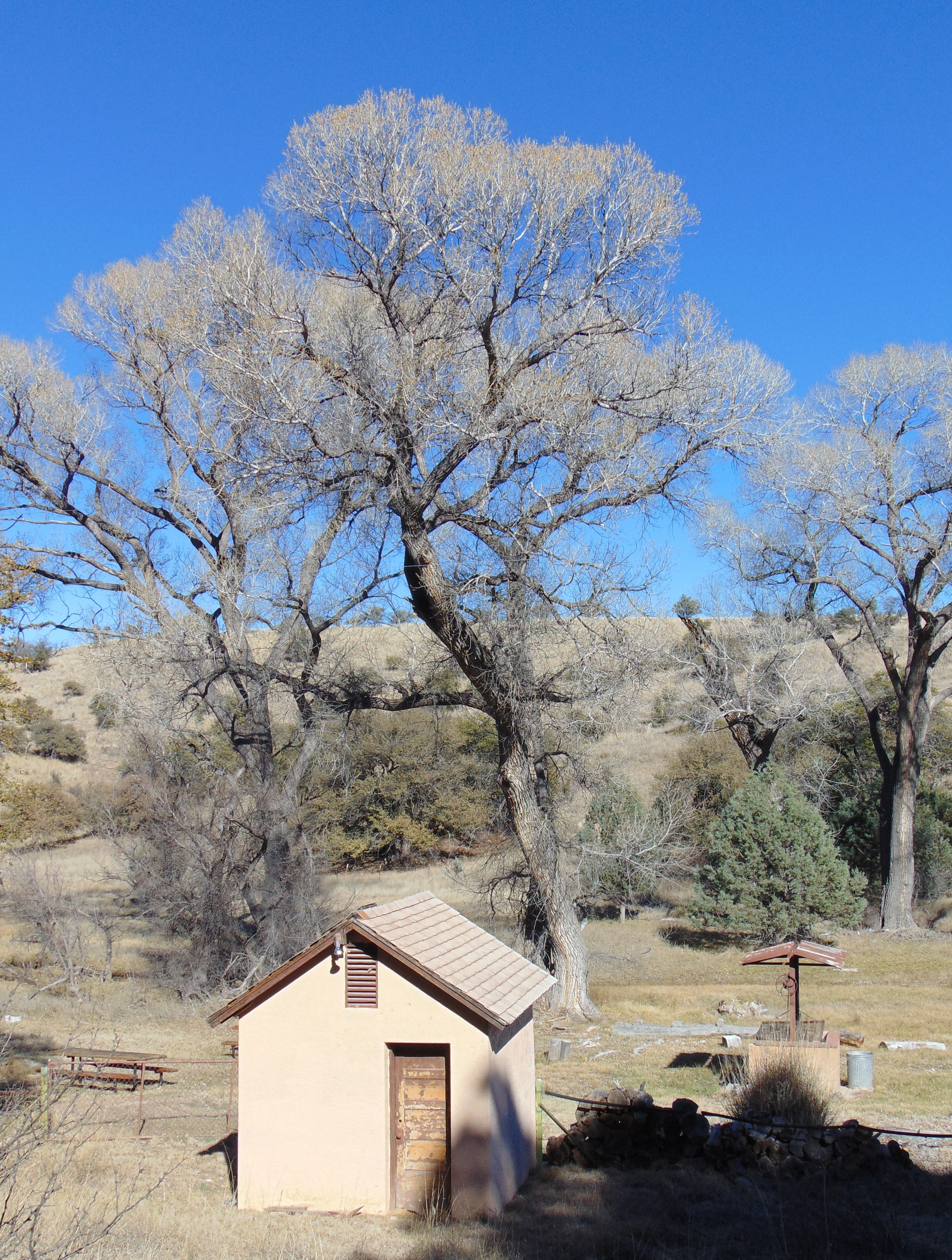
The pumphouse and well along Turkey Creek (2015).
