= Canelo School =

- U.S. National Register of Historic Places
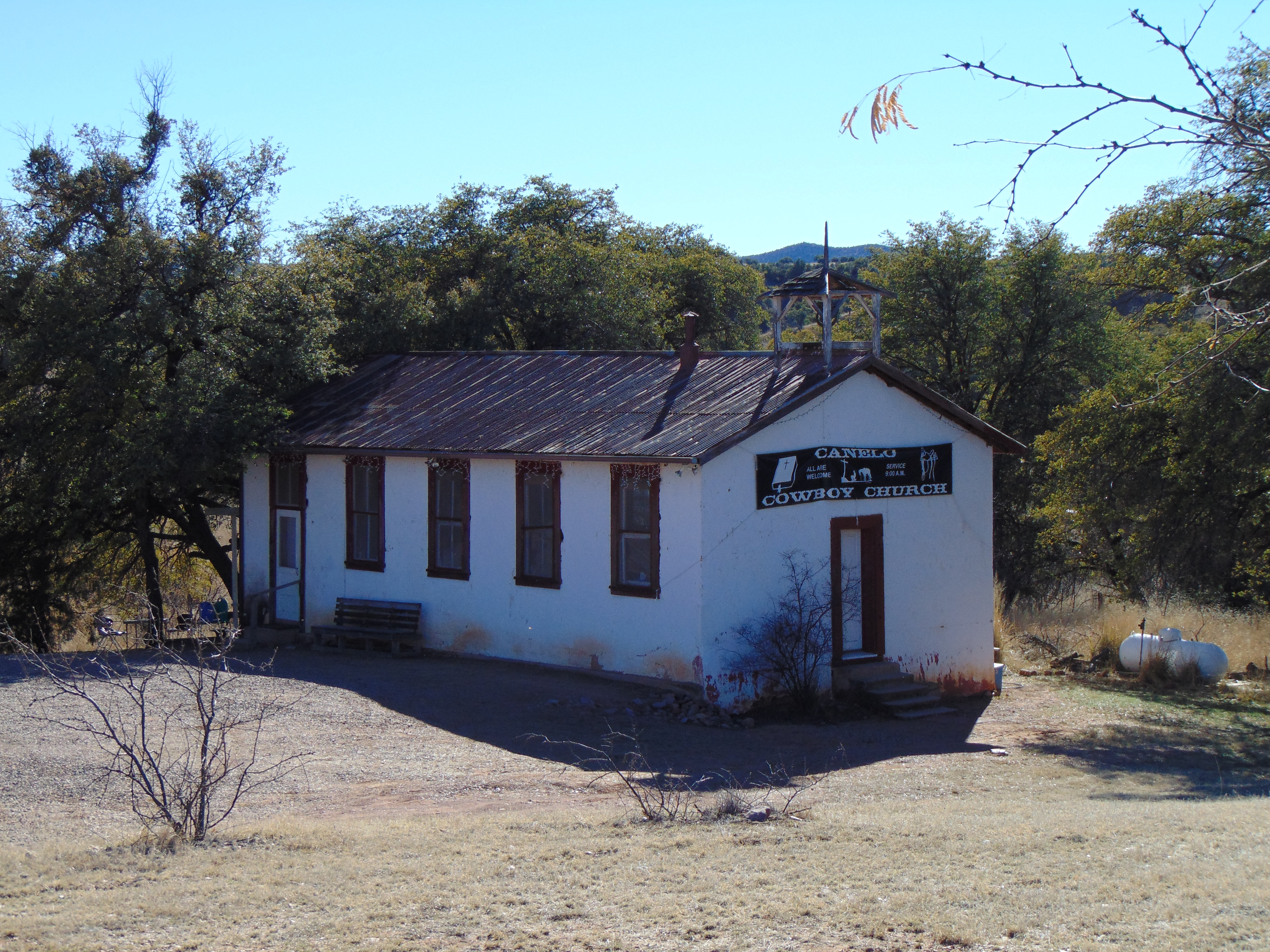
- The Canelo School, which is now home to the Canelo Cowboy Church.

- Location within Arizona Location within the United States
- Location: Canelo, Arizona, USA
- Coordinates: 31°32′31.67″N 110°30′38.37″W
- Area: 2.025 acres (0.819 ha)
- Built: 1912
- Architectural style: Rectangular one-room schoolhouse
- NRHP reference No.: 91000981
- Added to NRHP: July 31, 1991

The Canelo School is a historic one-room schoolhouse in eastern Santa Cruz County, Arizona, in the ghost town of Canelo. Opened in 1912, the Canelo School is one of the few one-room adobe schoolhouses remaining in the state. As a rare and well-preserved surviving example of a once common school building type in southern Arizona. The Canelo School was placed on the National Register of Historic Places on July 31, 1991.

== Name ==
"Canelo" comes from the Spanish word "canela", meaning cinnamon, and was the name applied to the nearby Canelo Hills, which have a light brownish or cinnamon colored appearance when viewed from the south. In 1904, the local Forest Ranger, Robert A. Rodgers, asked the county to establish a post office in town named "Canille", which was later changed to "Canela" and finally to "Canelo" over the following years. As a result of these alterations in spelling, the Canelo School is also referred to as the "Canille School".

== History ==
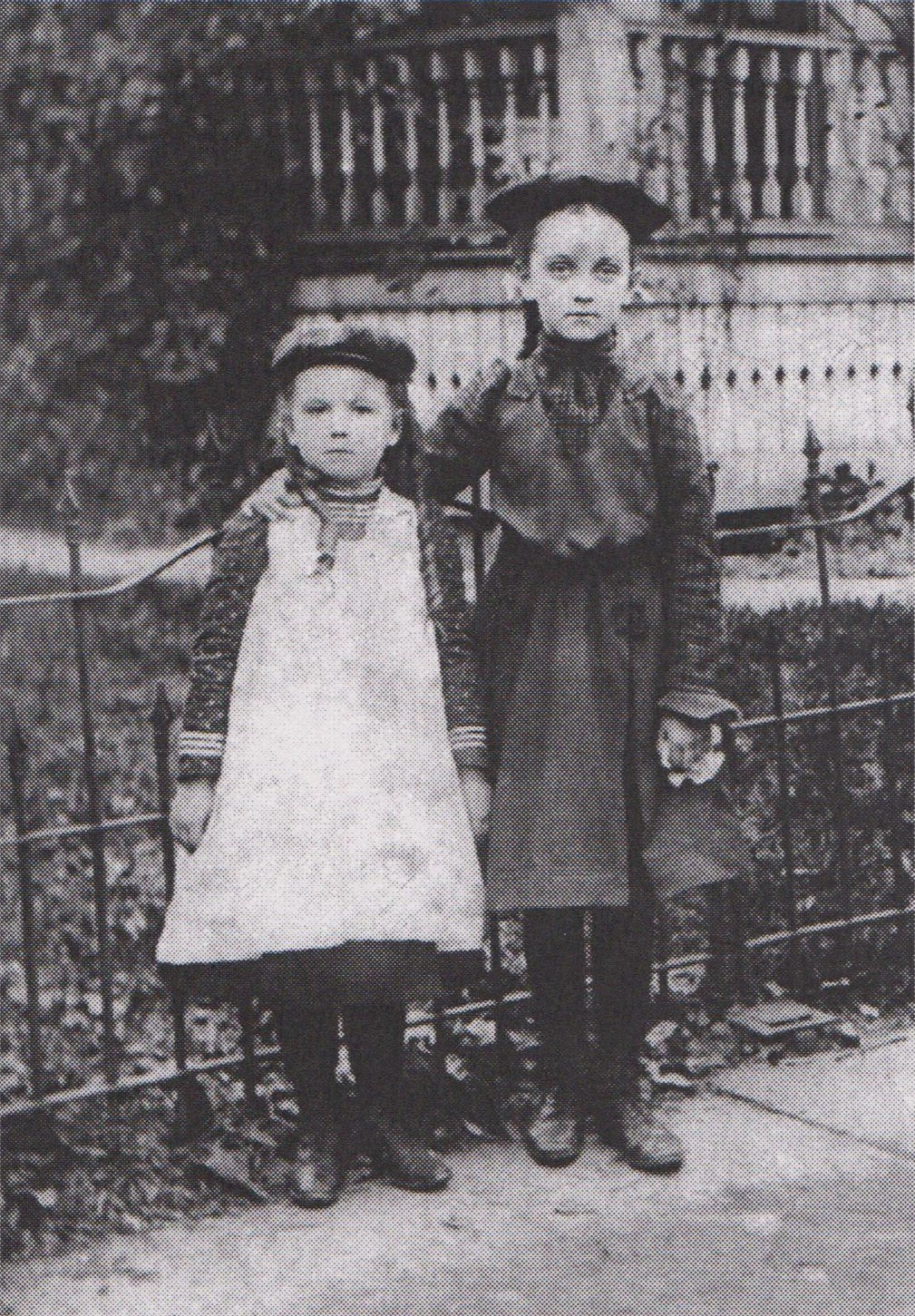
Fern Bartlett (left) and her older sister, Chopeta, both of whom were school teachers in southern Arizona in the early 20th century.

The Canelo School was built in 1912 to replace a similar one-room adobe schoolhouse located in Camp Evans, which was a small silver mining camp two miles to the east of Canelo. The site chosen for construction of the new building was on the homestead of B.K. Wilson, who was the school teacher in Camp Evans. Wilson deeded the property to the Canelo School District about 1914 with a caveat that stated the land would be forfeited if used for commercial or industrial purposes. The deed was recorded in 1942 at the request of Cora Everhart, a Santa Cruz County superintendent who taught in many of the one-room schoolhouses in southern Arizona.

The Canelo School first opened in September 1912 with about twenty attendees and closed in 1948, when the number of students declined to just one. The first school teacher was Miss Fern Bartlett, a twenty-year-old woman who rode her horse eight miles to get to the schoolhouse every morning. Since its closing, the schoolhouse has served the people in the Canelo area as a community center, country store, church, and funeral home. In 1917, the trustees of the Canelo School District became the legal agents responsible for the Black Oak Cemetery, a free-use graveyard a few miles northwest of the townsite. The schoolhouse is currently occupied by the Canelo Cowboy Church and is open to visitors on Sundays.

The Canelo School has a stone and concrete foundation, adobe walls, a cedar roof and wooden floors made of pine and oak. Heat was originally supplied by a wood-burning stove. In the 1930s, the adobe walls were plastered and sections of tin were placed over the cedar shingles on the roof. The front entrance is at the northern end of the building, above which is a square bell tower with a pyramidal top. There are five windows on the western wall and four on the eastern side. A fifth window in the eastern wall was later converted into a doorway and side entrance. There are no doors or windows in the southern wall. In spite of some damage caused by vandalism and neglect, the Canelo School remains "virtually the same" as it was when built in 1912.

== See also ==
- Canelo Ranger Station
- National Register of Historic Places listings in Santa Cruz County, Arizona
