= Canelo, Arizona =

- Ghost town
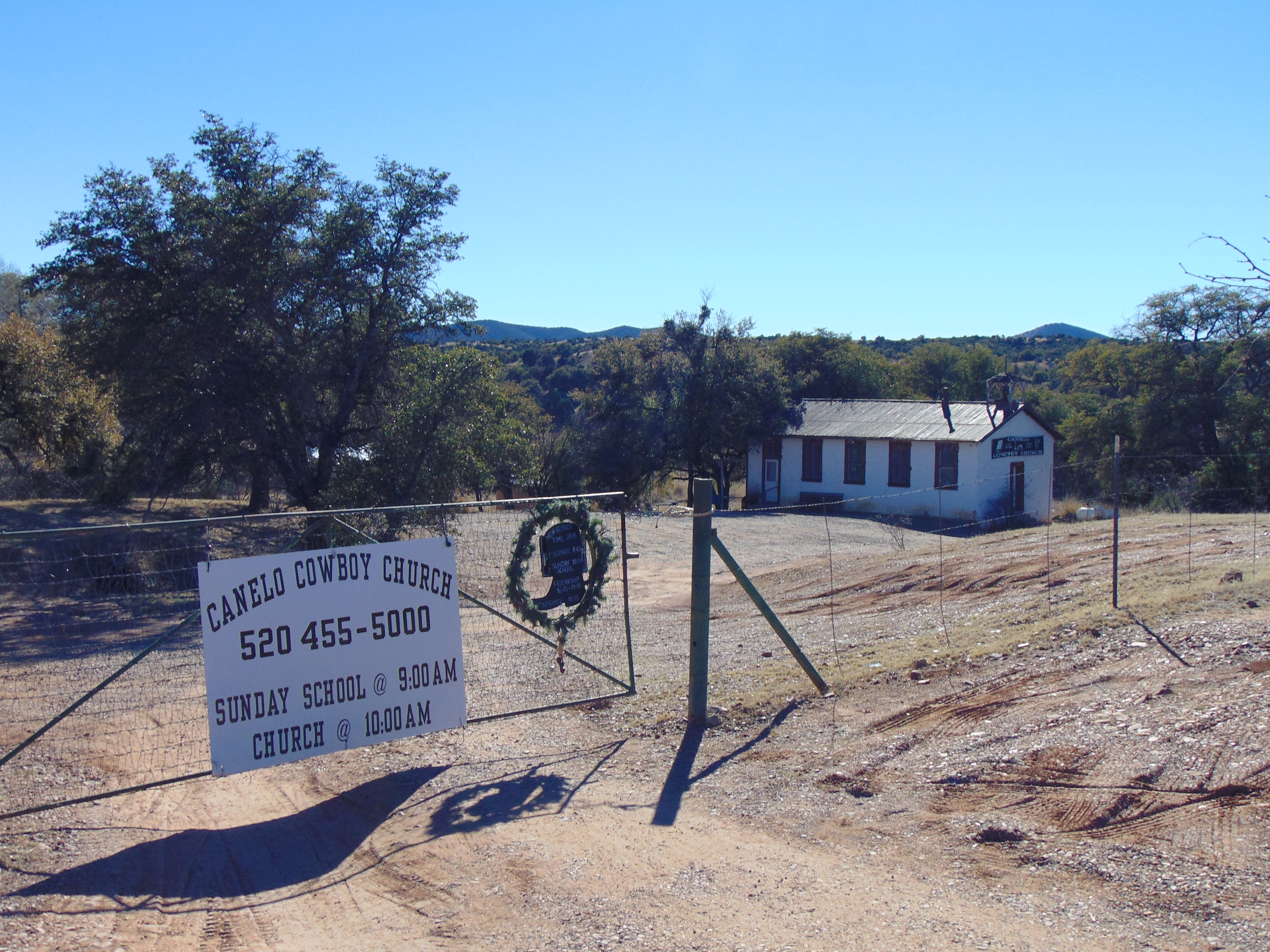
- The Canelo Cowboy Church, a former schoolhouse built in 1912.

- Location within Arizona Location within the United States
- Coordinates: 31°32′34″N 110°30′52″W
- Country: United States
- State: Arizona
- County: Santa Cruz
- Elevation: 4,990 ft (1,521 m)
- Time zone: UTC-7 (MST (no DST))
- Post Office Opened: August 22, 1904
- Post Office Closed: 1924

Canelo is a ghost town in eastern Santa Cruz County, Arizona, between the Canelo Hills and the northern end of the Huachuca Mountains. The site lies along Turkey Creek on Arizona State Route 83, between Sonoita and Parker Canyon Lake, which is about ten miles (16 km) to the south-southeast in Cochise County. Today, several historic buildings listed on the National Register of Historic Places remain standing in Canelo, including a one-room schoolhouse and a United States Forest Service ranger station.

== Name ==
"Canelo" is an alternative spelling of the Spanish word "canela", which means "cinnamon" in English. The town of Canelo gets its name from the Canelo Hills, which have a light brownish or cinnamon colored appearance when viewed from the south. It was originally spelled "Canille", but was later changed to "Canela" and finally to "Canelo" over the following years.

== History ==
The Canelo area was first settled in the late 19th century by Captain Joe Parks, who arrived in 1882 to homestead along Turkey Creek. A post office wasn't opened until after the turn of the century in 1904. The local Forest Ranger and area resident, Robert A. Rodgers, was the first postmaster and the man responsible for naming the little town, which boasted a general store, a post office, a schoolhouse and a few homes in its heyday in the 1920s and 1930s. Robert's wife Annie took over the post office in 1906 and was in turn succeeded by another pioneer named Addie Parker in 1910. All three are buried in Black Oak Cemetery, two miles (3 km) northwest of the townsite.

The Canelo School was built in 1912 and remained open until 1948. Today the building is listed on the National Register of Historic Places and was the home to Canelo Cowboy Church from April 16, 2006, until May 16, 2016. The building has also been used as a community center, country store and funeral home for burials in Black Oak Cemetery, which opened in 1917 on land allotted by the Forest Service. The cemetery is open to burial free-of-charge to all local pioneers, which is anyone who lived in the Canelo area before December 1952. It is also free for those who already have family buried in the cemetery.

Canelo Ranger Station was established in 1932 and listed on the National Register of Historic Places in 1993. Five historic buildings are located on the site, including the ranger station office, residence, garage, pumphouse and barn, all of which were built of adobe brick by members of the Forest Service and the Civilian Conservation Corps in the early 1930s. The ranger station, northwest of the schoolhouse on Membrillo Lane, is still in use by the Forest Service and is no longer open to visitors.

== Gallery ==
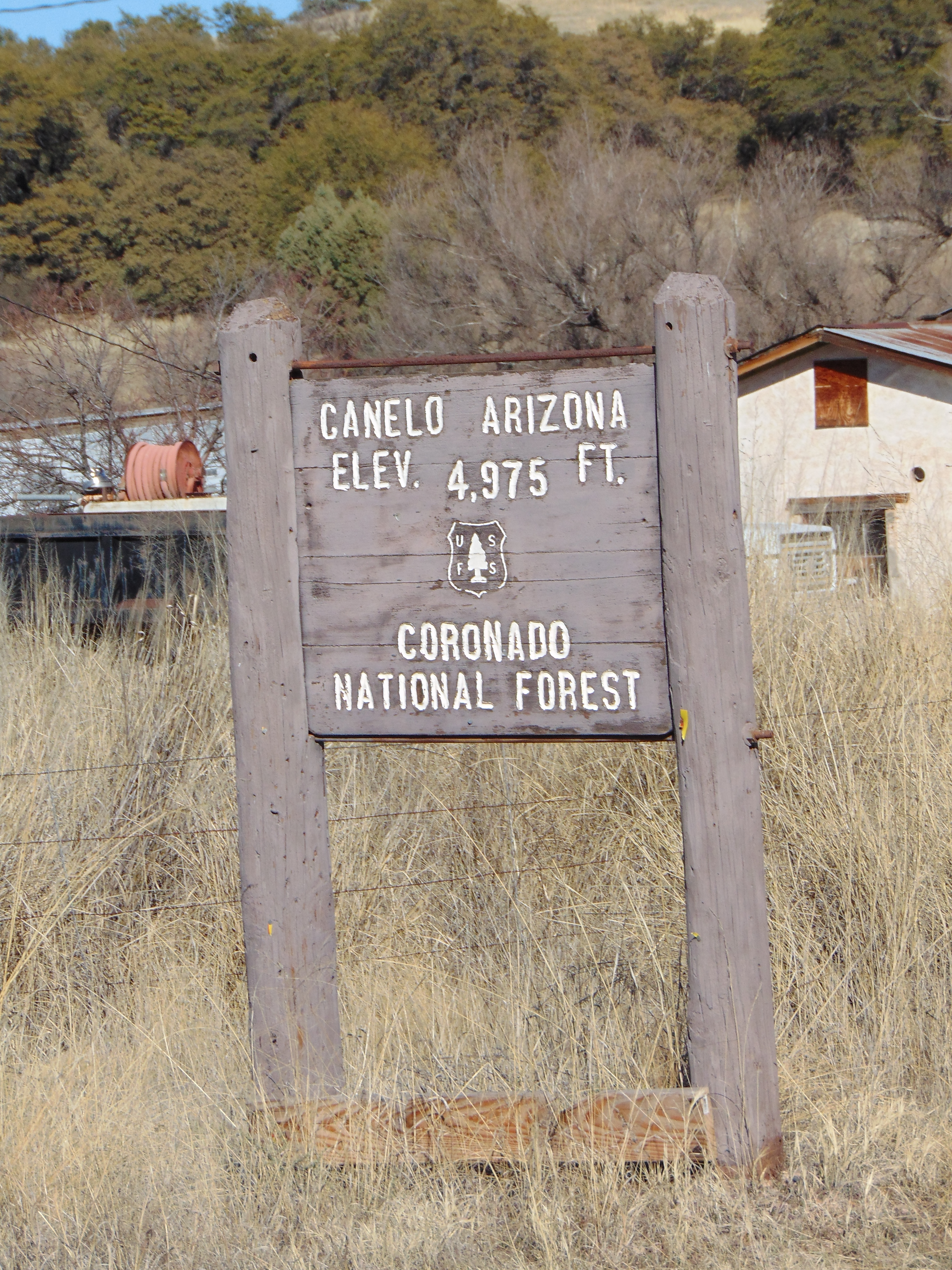
Road sign

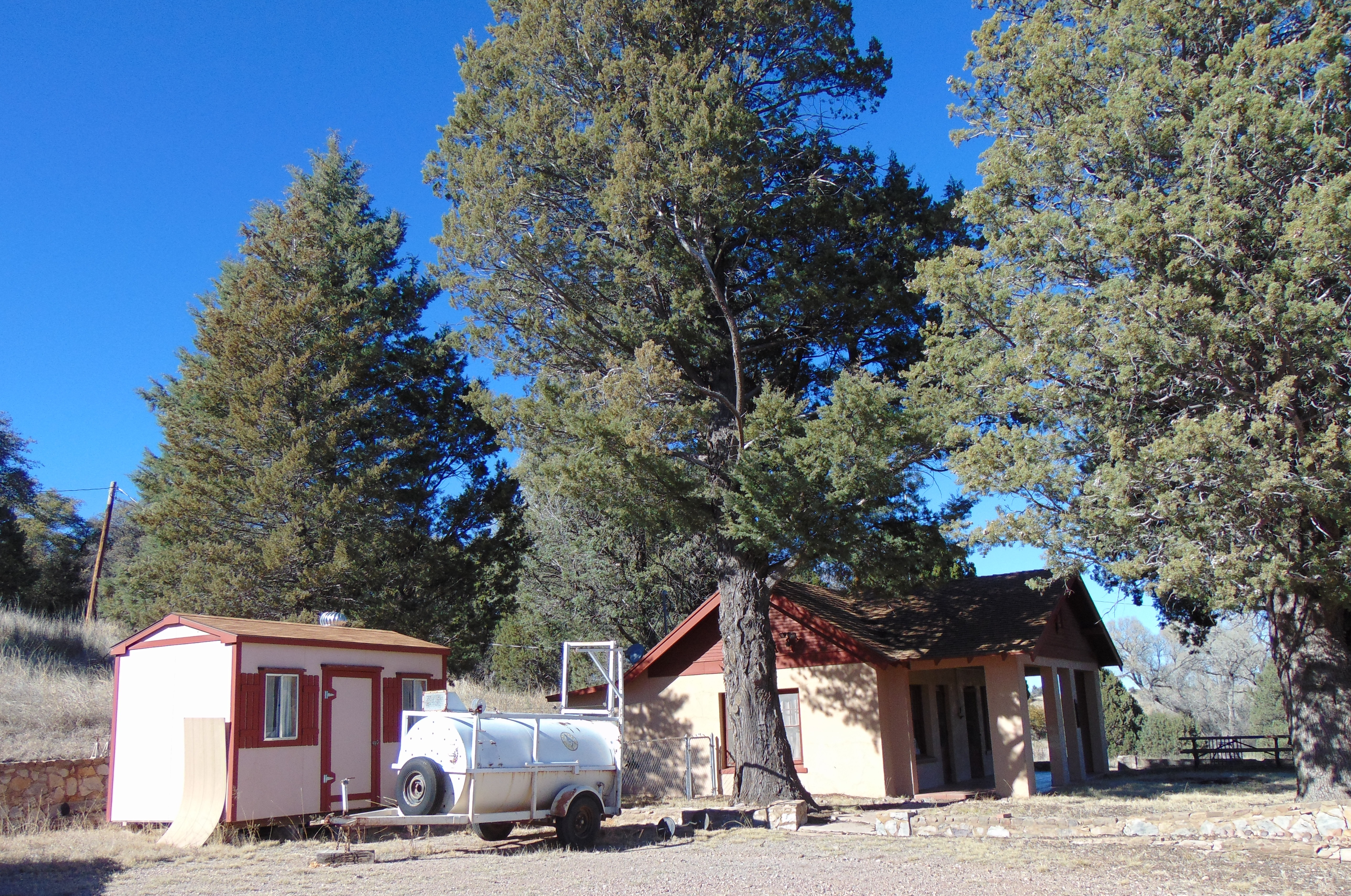
Canelo Ranger Station

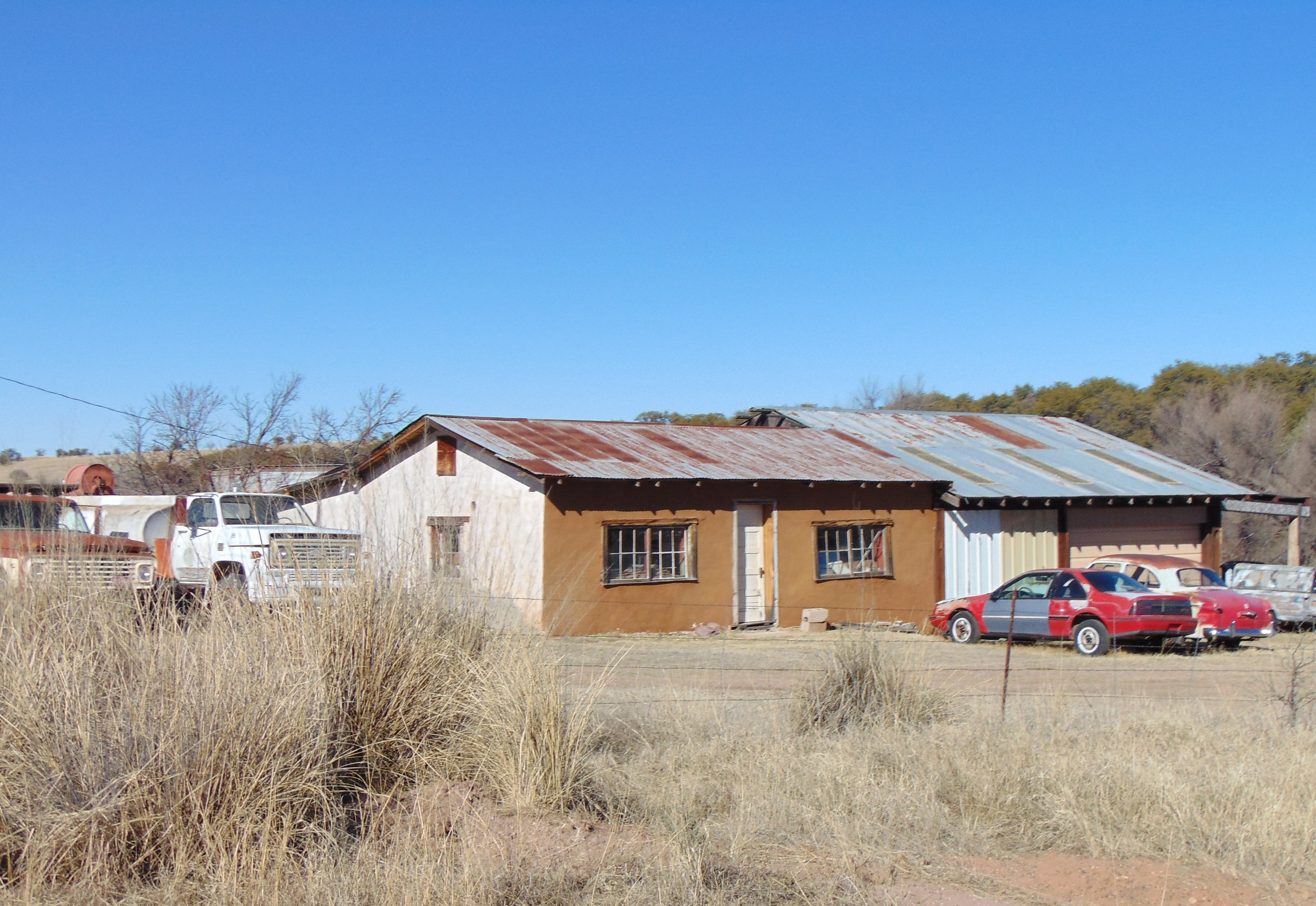
The old general store and post office is now used as a house.

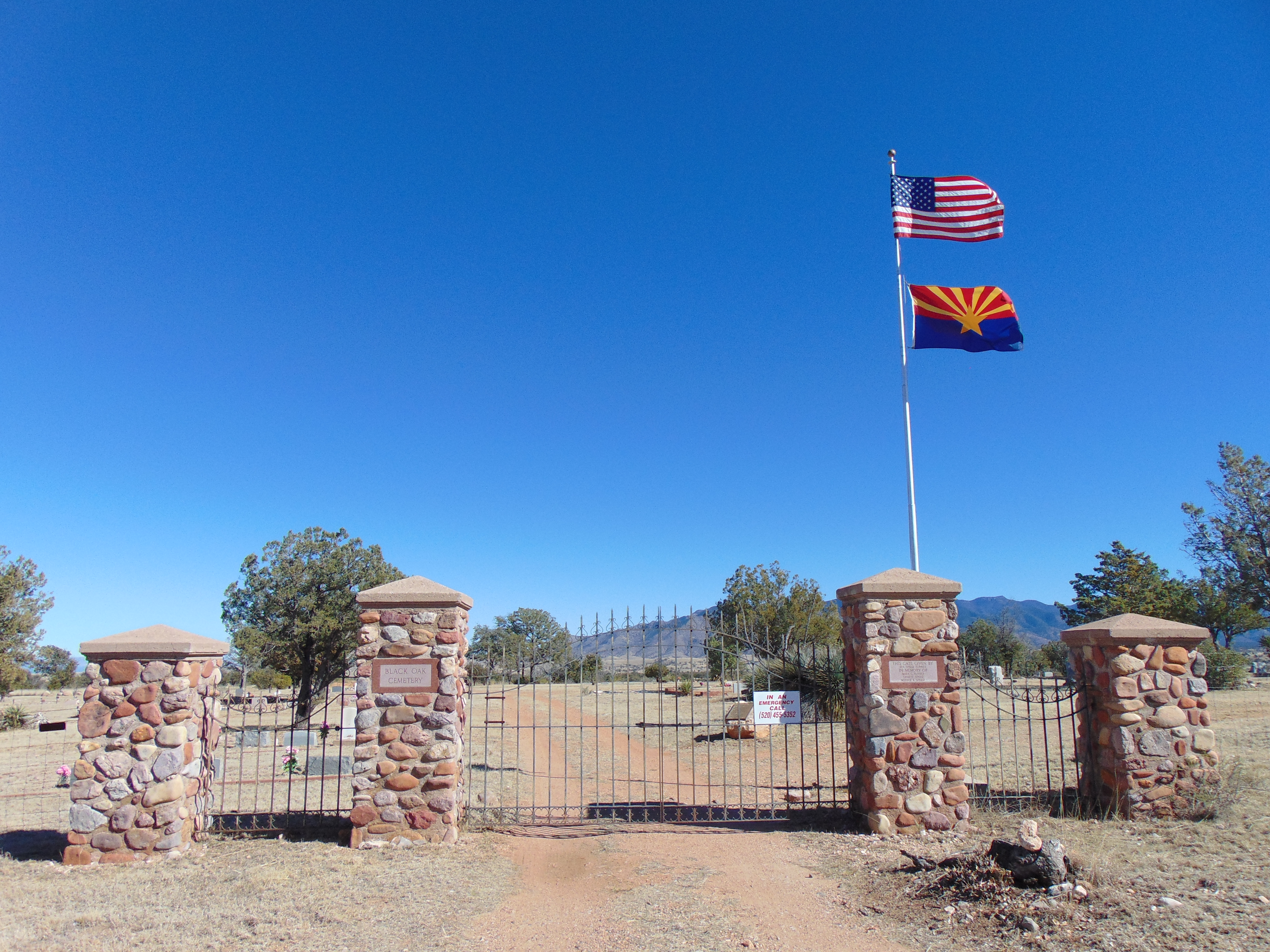
Black Oak Cemetery

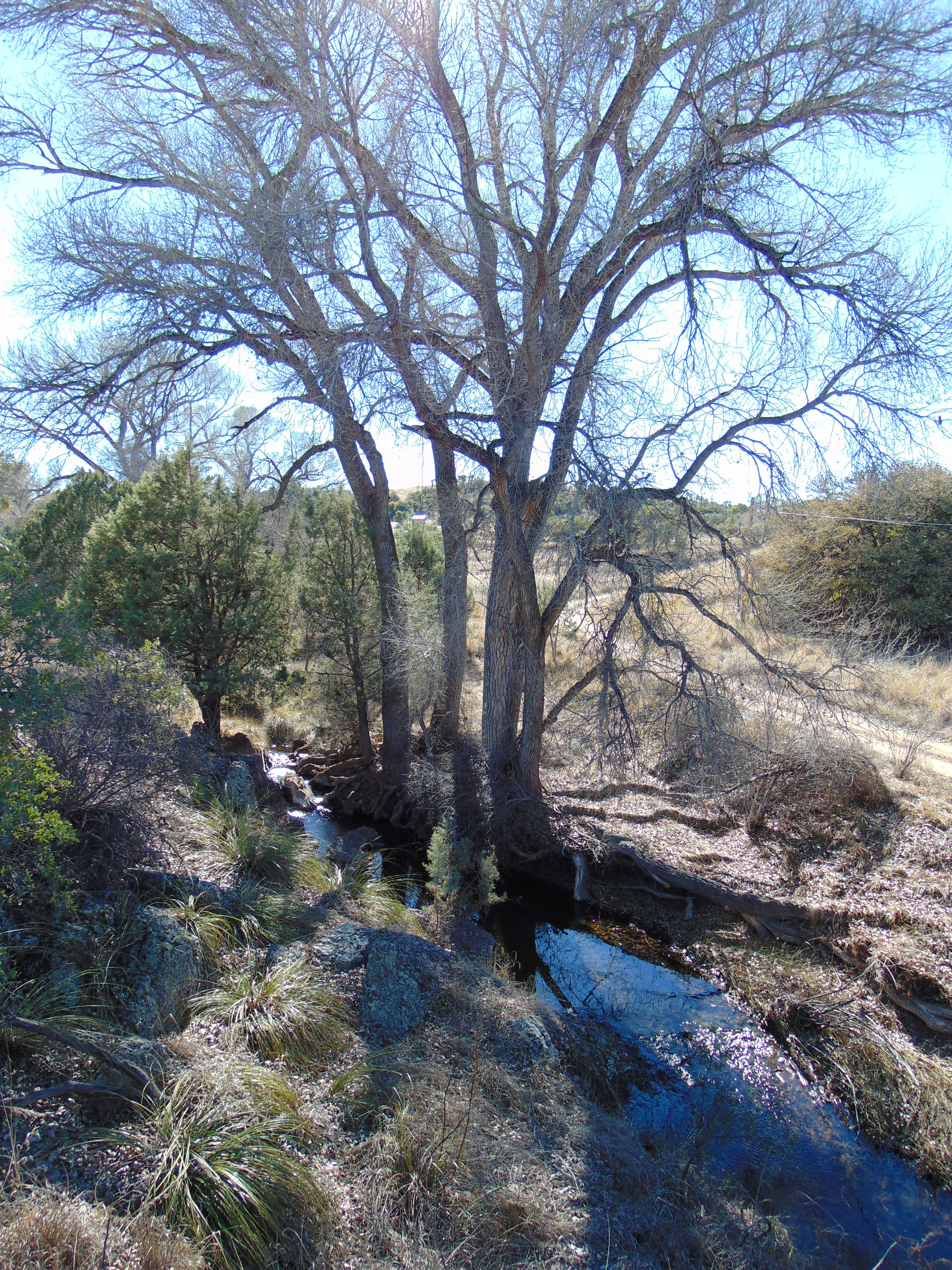
Turkey Creek

== See also ==
- List of ghost towns in Arizona
