= Parker Canyon Lake =

Waterbody in Cochise County, Arizona

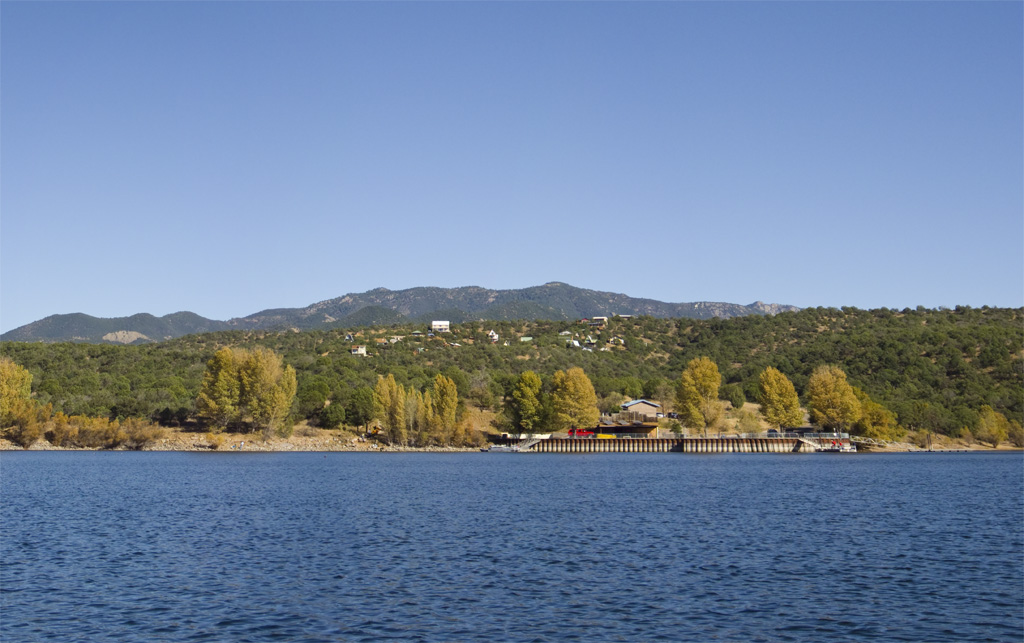
- Parker Canyon Lake

- Location within Arizona
- Location: Cochise County, Arizona, United States
- Coordinates: 31°25′37″N 110°27′19″W
- Type: reservoir
- Primary inflows: Parker, Merritt, and Collins Canyons
- Primary outflows: Parker Canyon
- Basin countries: United States
- Managing agency: Sierra Vista Ranger District; Coronado National Forest; U.S. Forest Service; U.S. Department of Agriculture
- Built: 1965
- Surface area: 132 acres (53 ha)
- Average depth: 40 ft (12 m)
- Max. depth: 60 ft (18 m)
- Surface elevation: 5,400 ft (1,600 m)
- Website: Official website

Parker Canyon Lake is located in southeastern Arizona, 28 miles (45 km) southwest of Sierra Vista around the Huachuca Mountains and about 5 miles (8.0 km) north of the border with Mexico. The lake is a reservoir formed by a dam in Parker Canyon in the south end of the Canelo Hills in southwestern Cochise County. Parker Canyon is a tributary to the Santa Cruz River in the San Rafael Valley. The facilities are maintained by Coronado National Forest division of the USDA Forest Service.

== Fish species ==
Parker Canyon Lake is stocked with rainbow trout once a month from October to March. The lake was stocked with channel catfish which now hold a reproducing population. The rest of the fish assemblage consist of largemouth bass, bluegill, green sunfish, redear sunfish, black bullhead, yellow bullhead, and mosquitofish. Northern pike, which were abundant, recently vanished in the past few years. Other fish that were stocked but didn't establish or their stockings ceased to exist include coho salmon, red shiners, fathead minnows, and threadfin shad.

== Recreational Activities ==
The Coronado National Forest maintains a campground with two loops. One is dedicated to tents only while the other accommodates RVs and Trailers. There is no electricity or dump facilities in the campground.

The lake hosts a boat ramp and a small store which offers food, fishing equipment, paddle boat, canoe, and motor boat rentals.

== Picture gallery ==
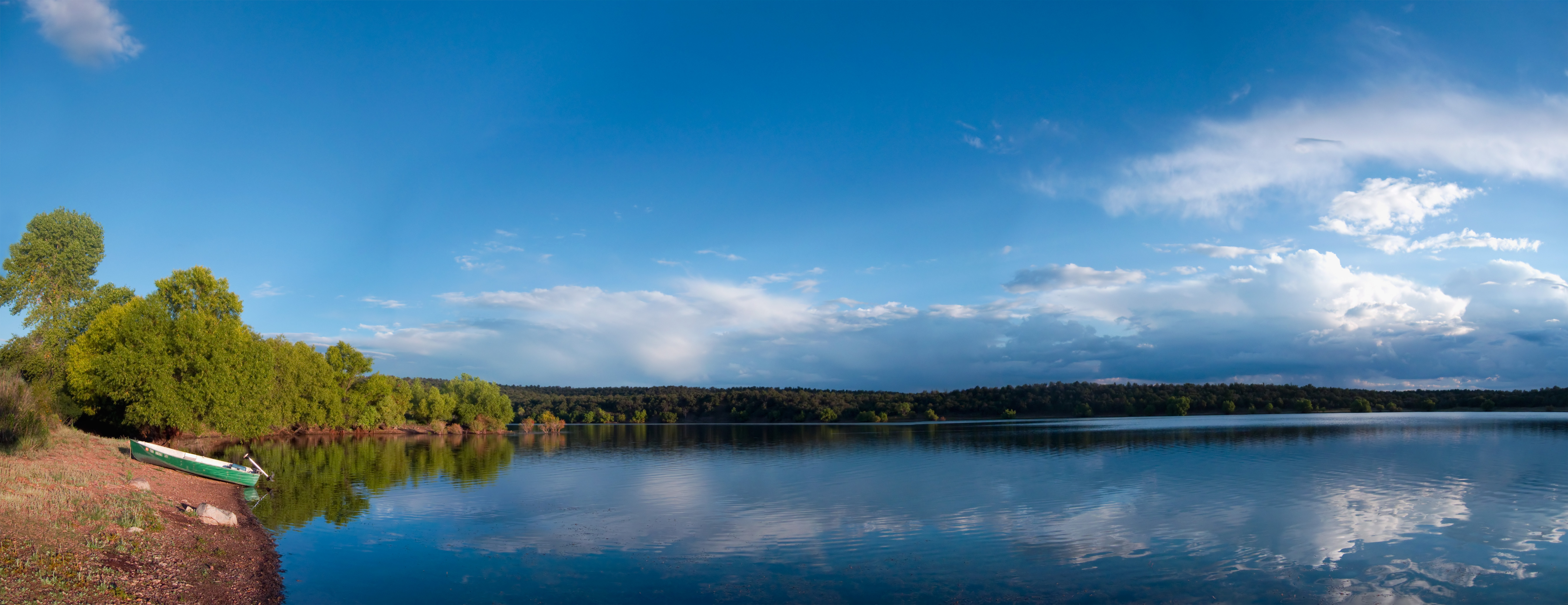

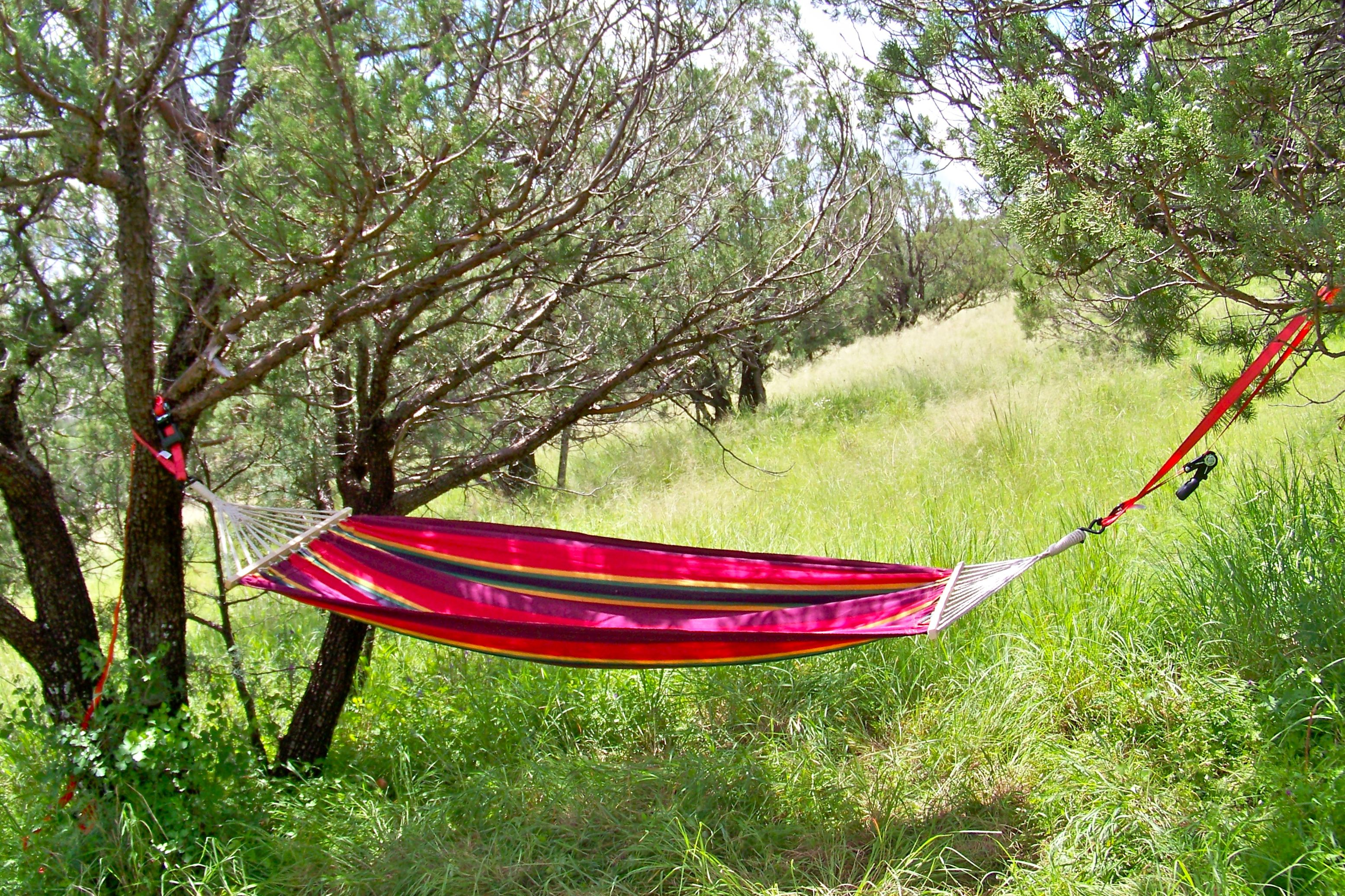

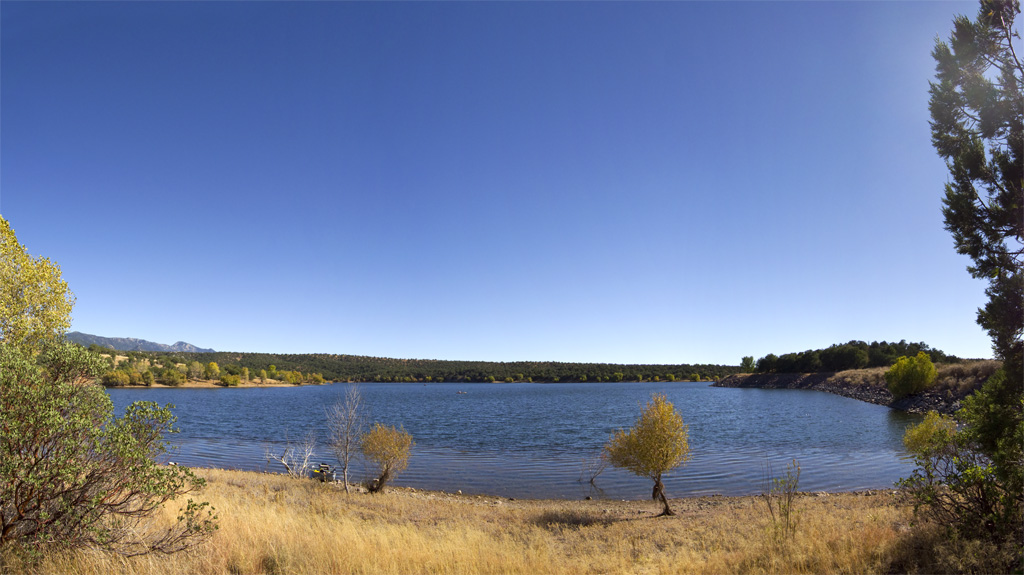

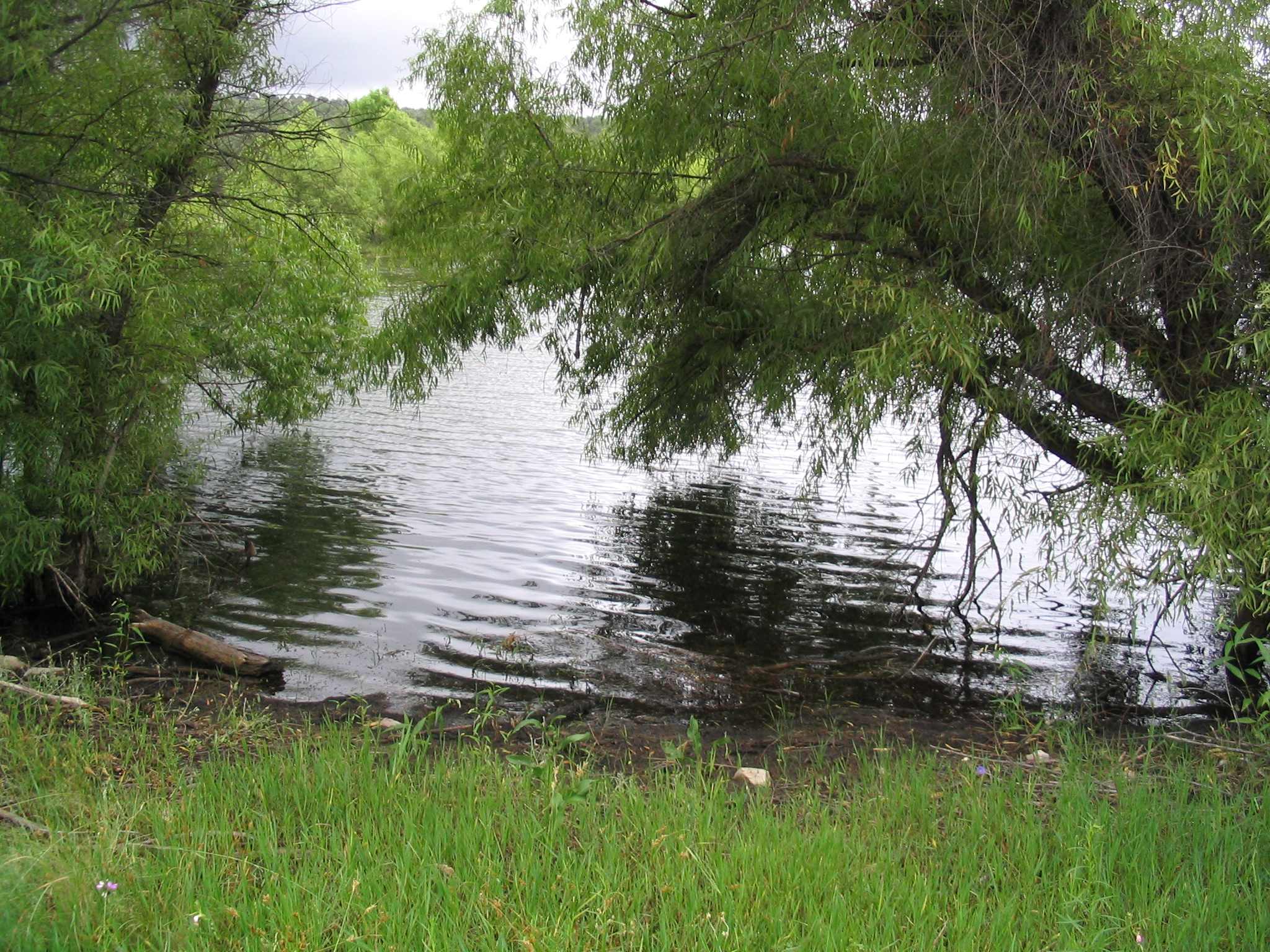

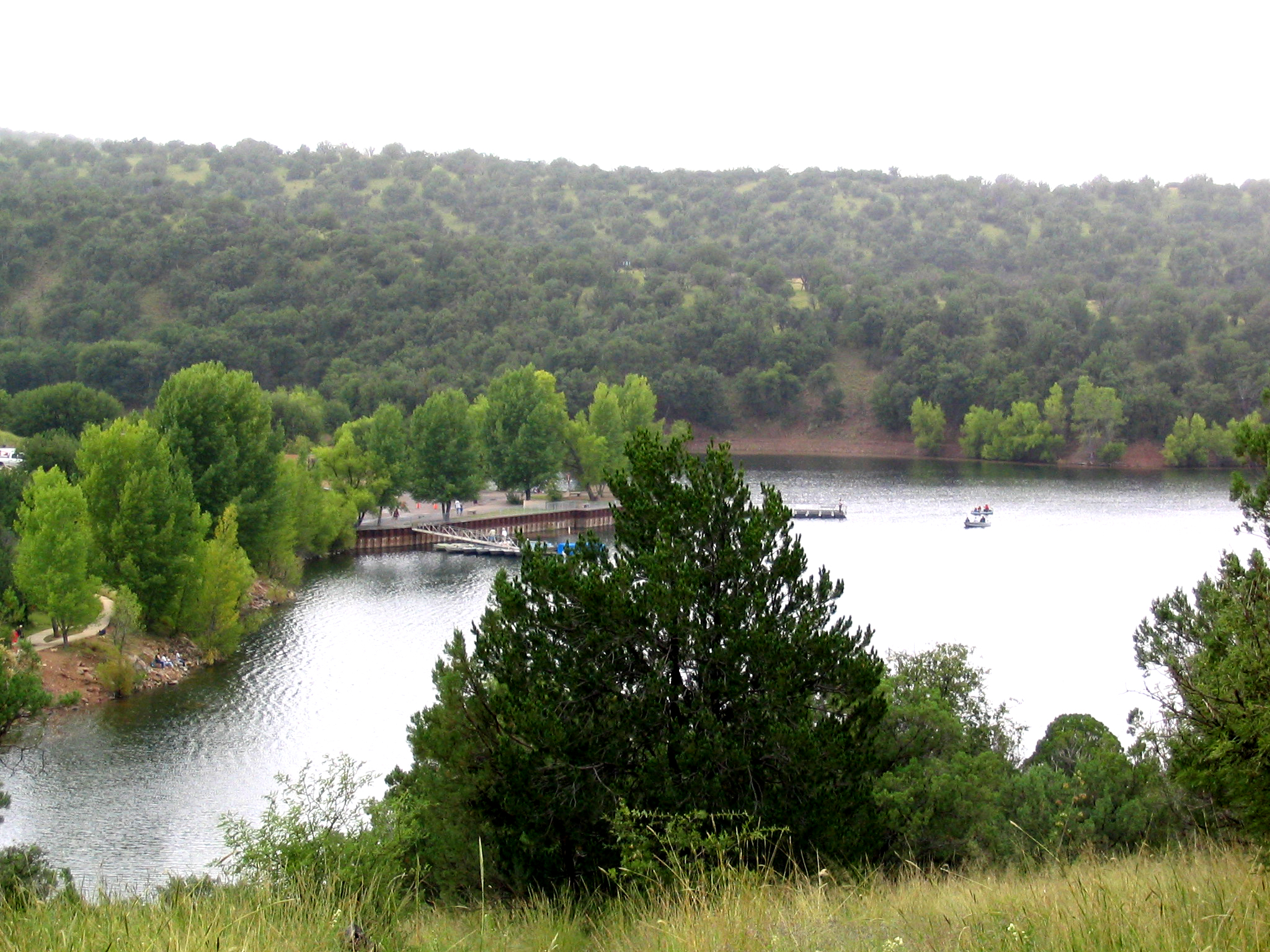

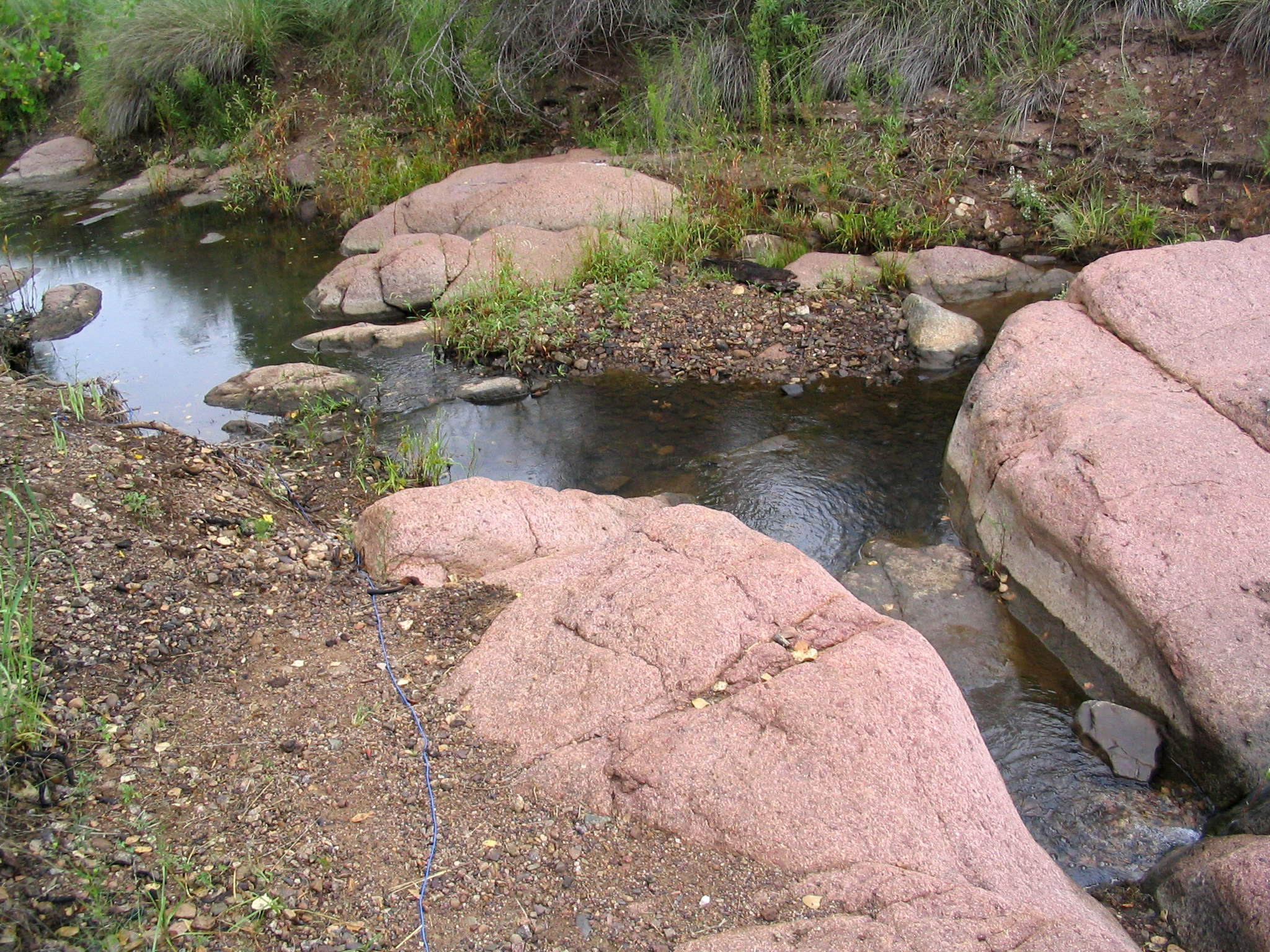

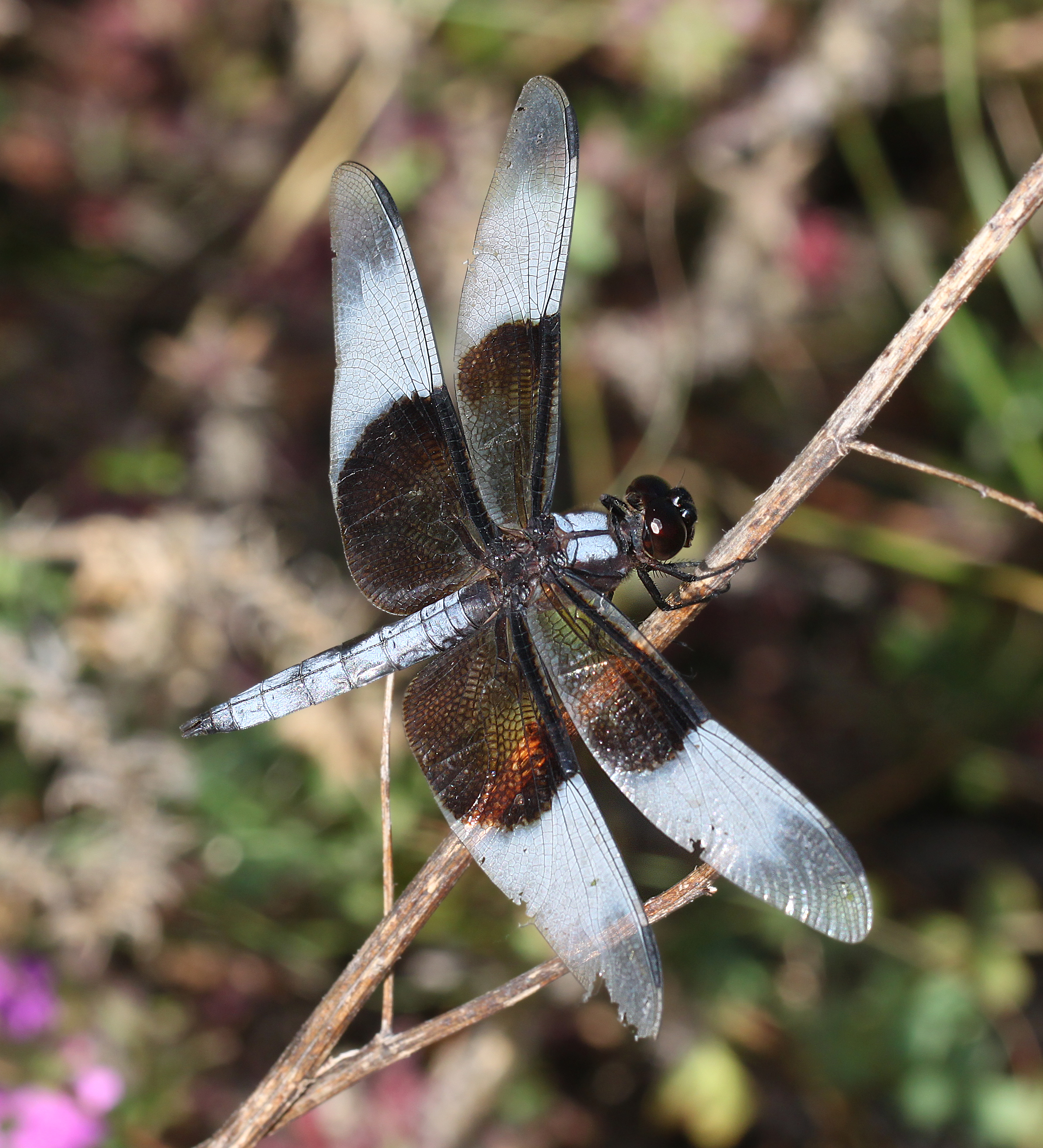
