= Canelo Hills Cienega Reserve =

Protected area in Santa Cruz County, Arizona

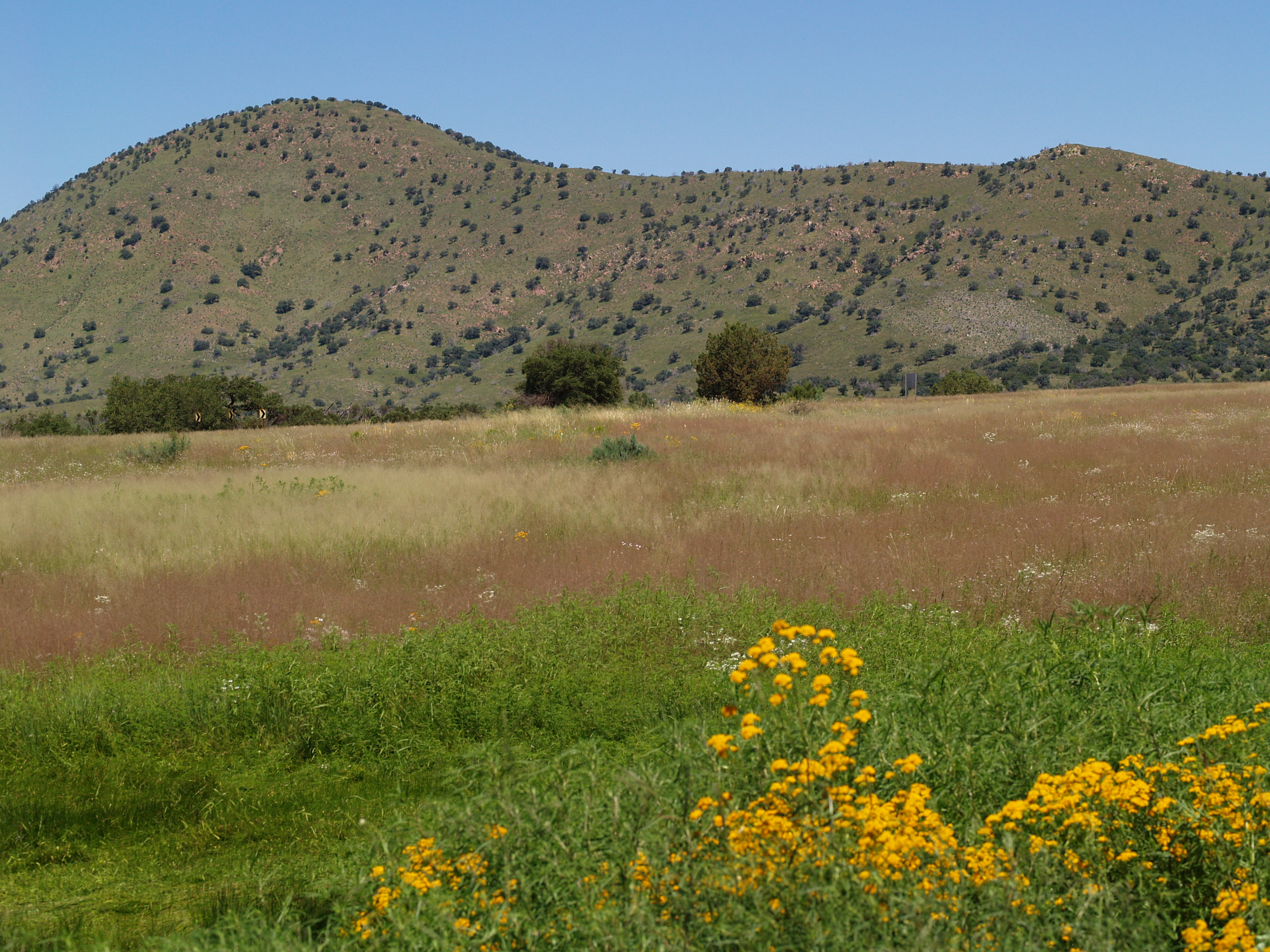
- Bullfrog Pond at Canelo Hills Cienega Preserve

- Location within Arizona
- Location: Canelo Hills
- Nearest city: Sonoita, Arizona
- Coordinates: 31.562246°N 110.525851°W
- Area: 260 acres (110 ha)
- Established: 1969

U.S. National Natural Landmark
- Designated: 1974

The Canelo Hills Cienega Reserve, is a nature preserve southeast of Sonoita, Arizona on the east side of the Canelo Hills. The area's 260 acres (110 ha) are a mix of rare cienega wetland and black oak and Arizona fescue fields. The preserve is notable for the extremely rare Canelo ladies tresses orchid (Spiranthes delitescens) and the Gila chub and Gila sucker that grow along its alkaline banks. The ranch was purchased by the Nature Conservancy in 1969 from the Knipes family. It was designated a National Natural Landmark in December 1974.
