= Canelo Hills =

Range in Santa Cruz County, Arizona

Coordinates: 31°31′55″N 110°35′19″W

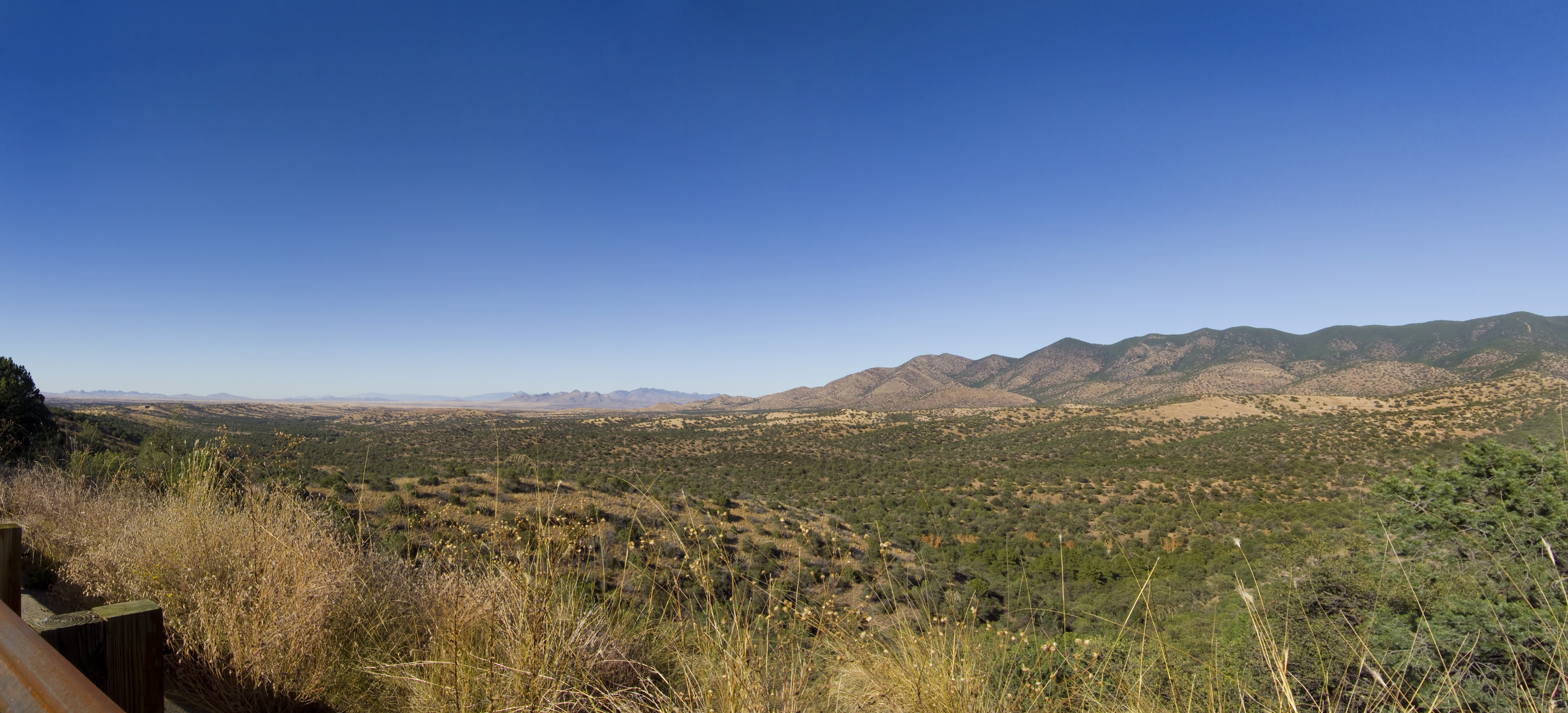
Looking Northeast over the East side of the Canelo Hills with the Huachuca Mountains to the East

The Canelo Hills are a range of low mountains or hills in eastern Santa Cruz County, Arizona. The range consists of a series of northwest–southeast trending ridges extending from the Sonoita Creek valley southwest of Sonoita to the Parker Canyon Lake area in southwest Cochise County, Arizona. The Canelo Hills merge with the Huachuca Mountains to the southeast. The San Rafael Valley lies to the southwest of the range and the Patagonia Mountains lie to the west across the Harshaw Creek valley. The Canelo Hills Cienega Reserve and the ghost town of Canelo, Arizona, are located on the eastern side of the hills.

== Geology ==
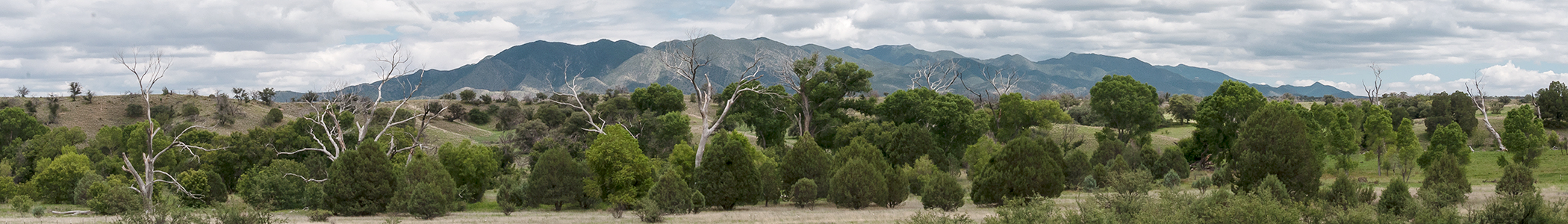
Canelo Hills during Monsoon

The Canelo Hills are underlain by northwest striking folded and faulted Permian sedimentary rocks and Jurassic–Triassic volcanic rocks. The southwest margin extending toward the Patagonias is underlain by Cretaceous–Eocene volcanics. The southern end of the Canelo Hills contain evidence for a volcanic caldera, the Parker Canyon Caldera. This caldera is mapped as a kidney shaped feature stretching from just north of Canelo Pass some 15 miles (24 km) to the southeast into the Huachucas and underlying the eastern portion of the San Rafael Valley. The Jurassic volcanics in the area consist of rhyolite welded tuff containing large exotic blocks of limestone, quartzite and other rock types interpreted as "intercaldera megabreccia lenses".

== See also ==
- Ciénega Creek

== Picture gallery ==
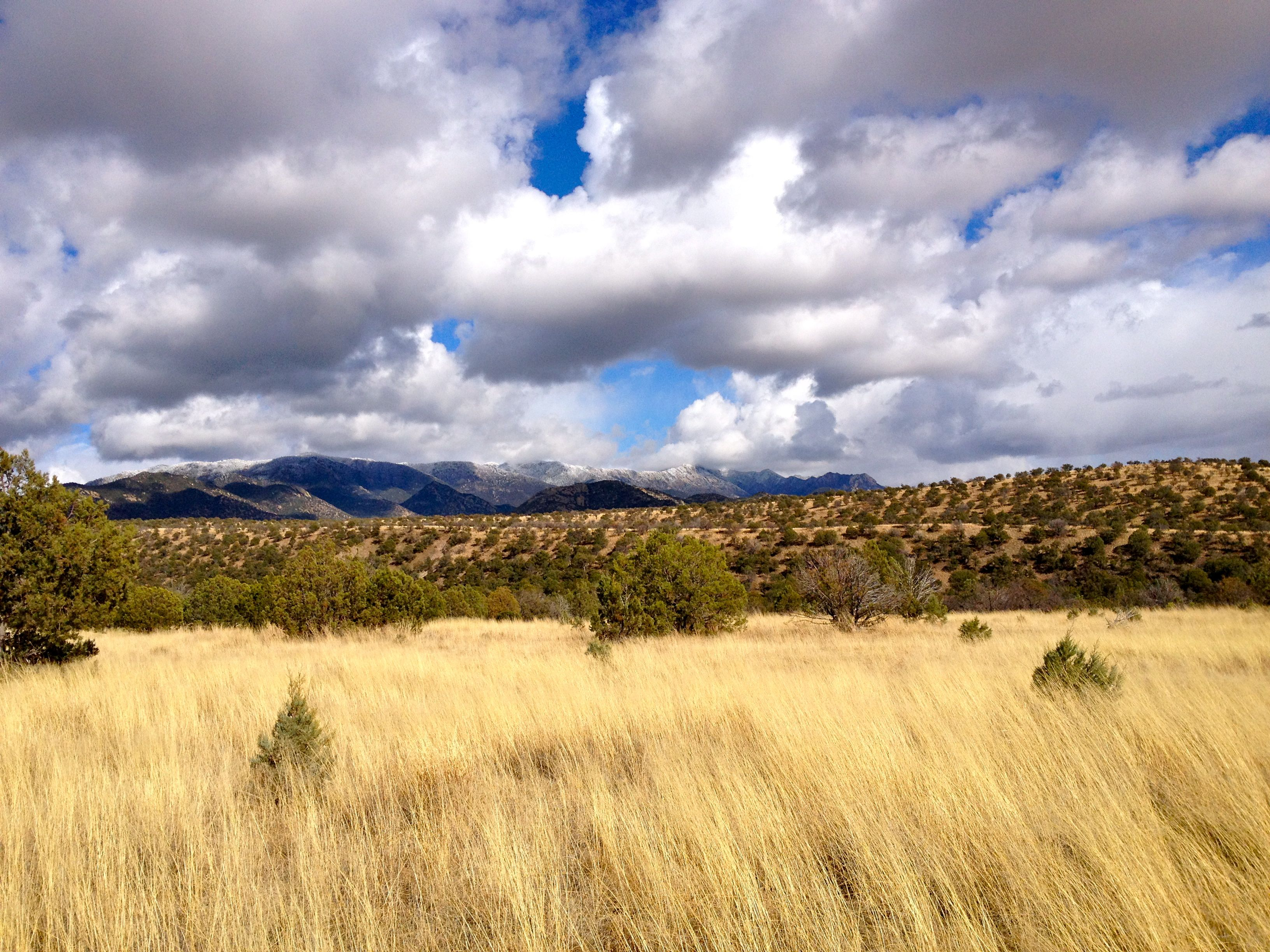

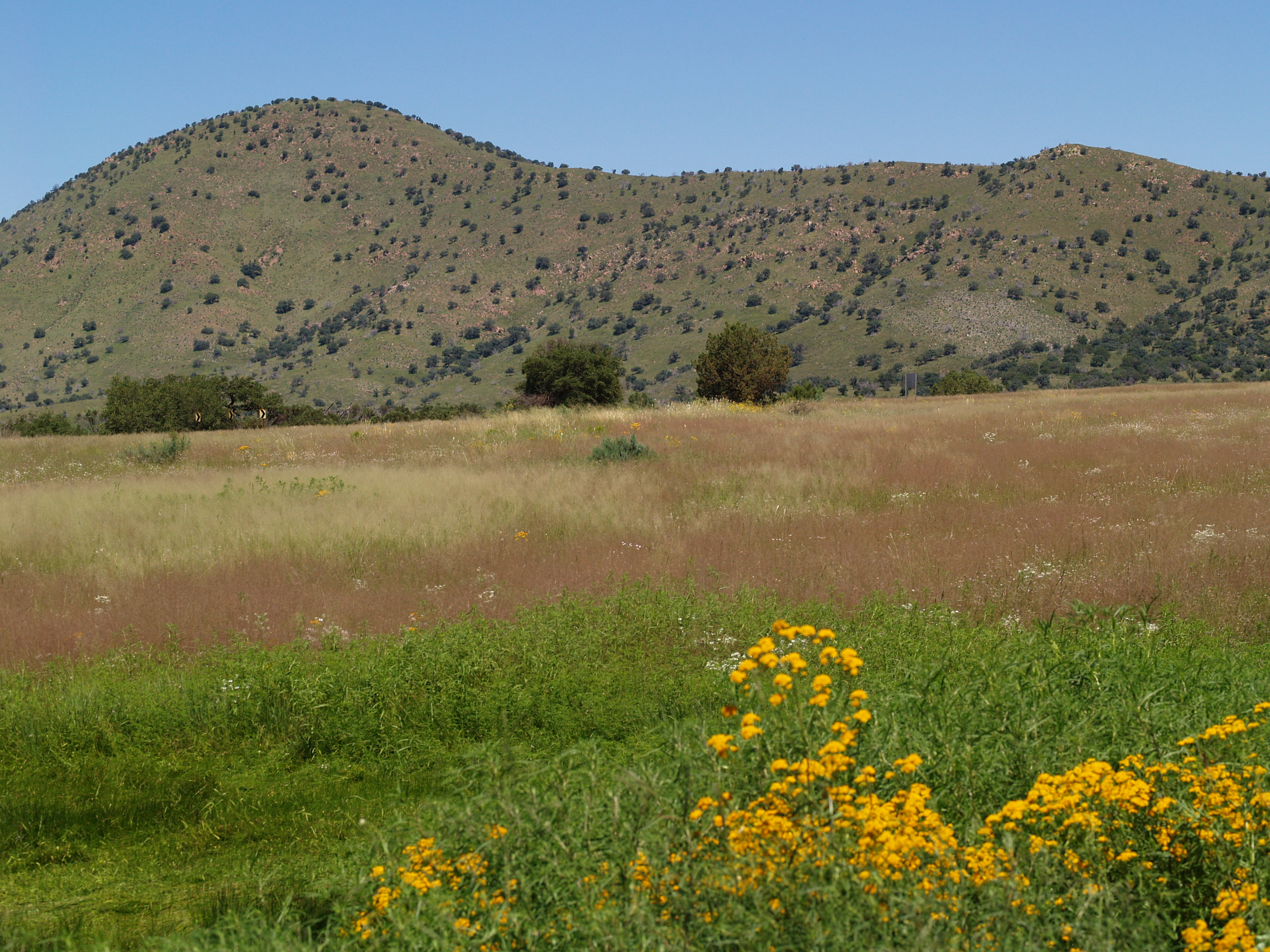

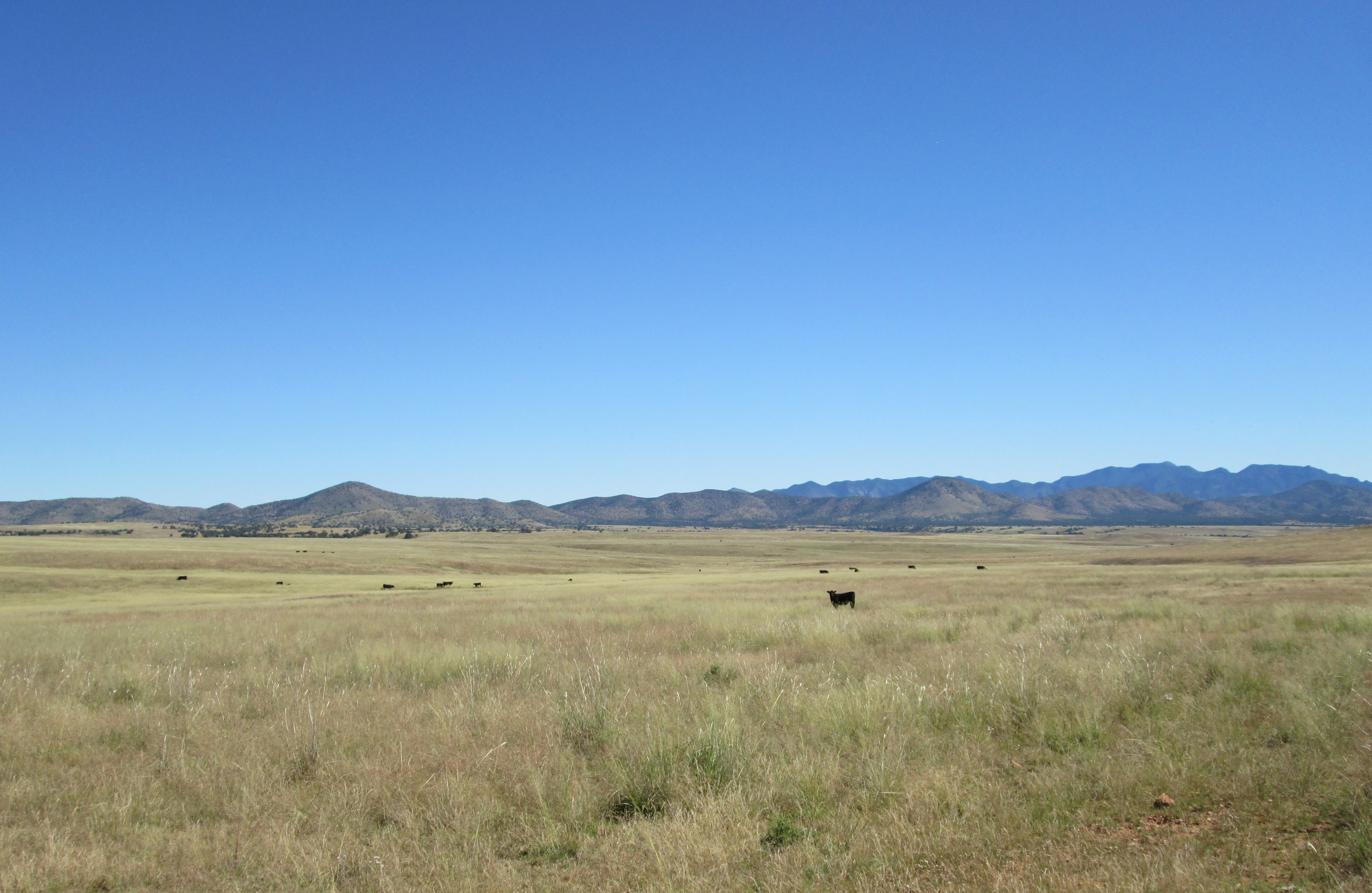

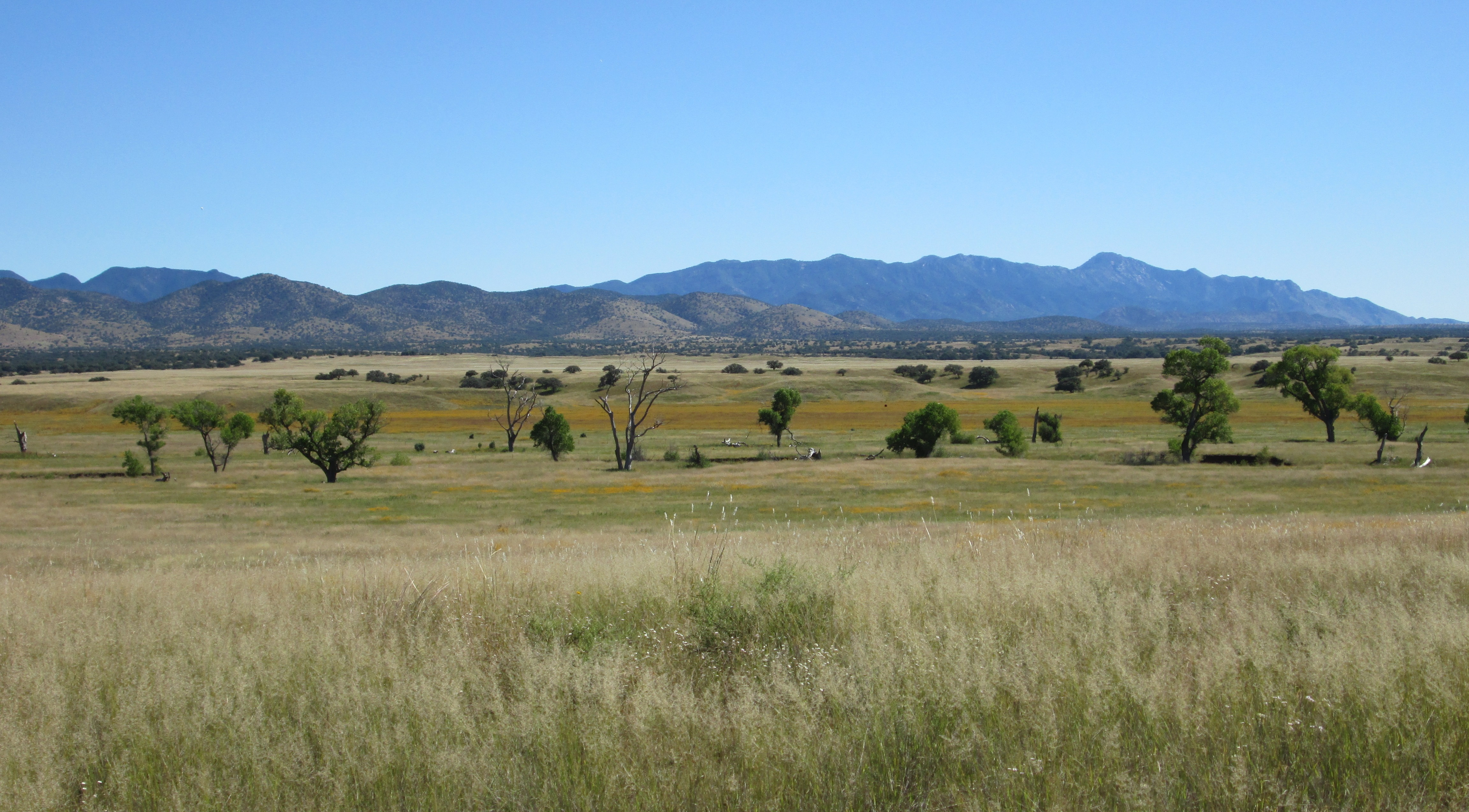
