= Cienega Valley (Arizona) =

Geographical area in Arizona

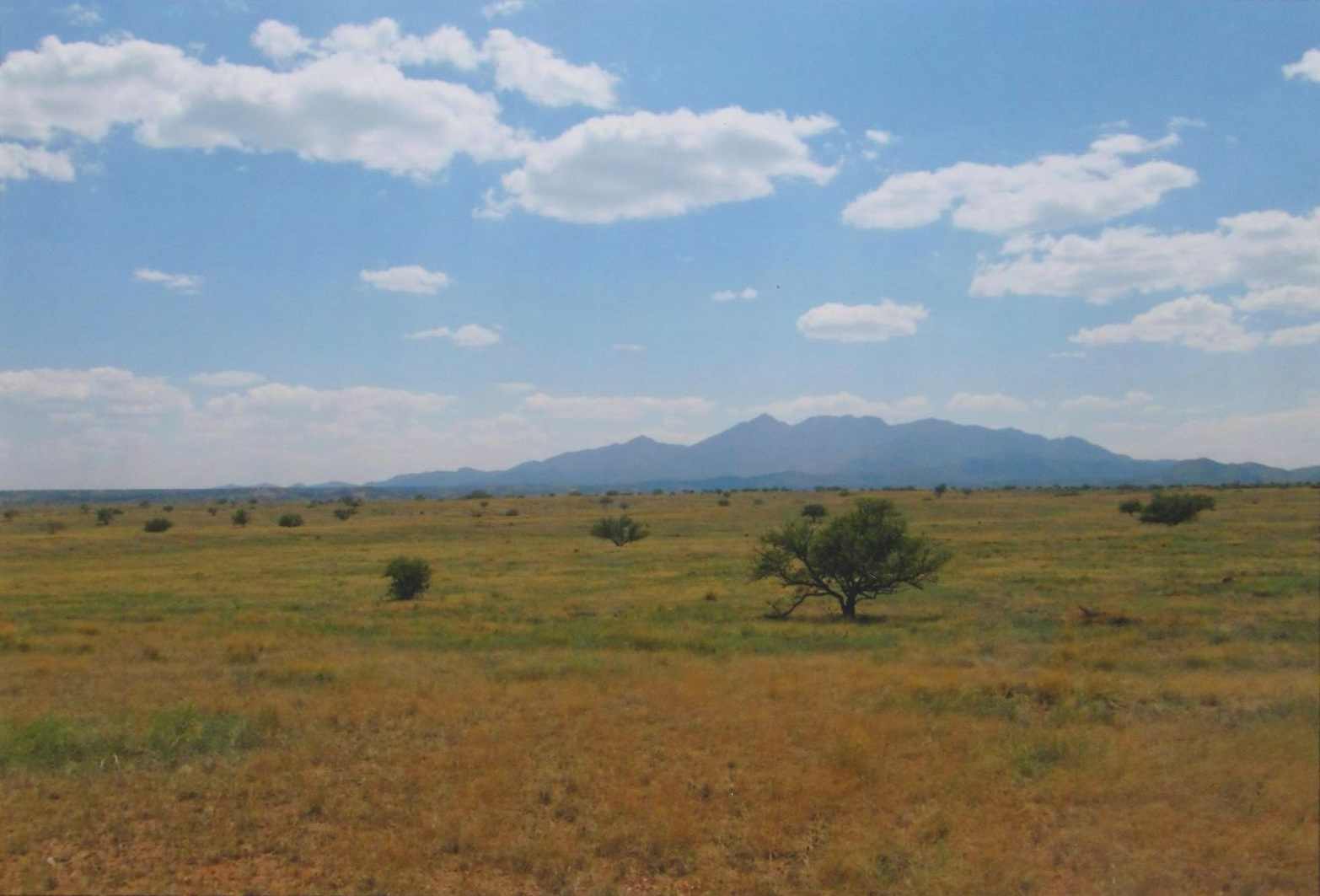
- Prairie with the Santa Rita Mountains in the background.

Geography
- Country: United States
- State: Arizona
- Communities: Vail; Sonoita
- Borders on: List: Rincon Mountains; Whetstone Mountains; Canelo Hills; Mustang Mountains; Santa Rita Mountains
- Coordinates: 31°46′48″N 110°37′08″W
- River: Cienega Creek
- Interactive map of Cienega Valley

Cienega Valley is a valley located southeast of Tucson, Arizona, in the transition zone between the Sonoran and Chihuahuan Deserts. It is bounded by the Rincon Mountains to the north, the Whetstone Mountains to the east, the Mustang Mountains to the southeast, the Canelo Hills to the south, and the Santa Rita-Empire Mountains complex to the west. Much of the area is now part of the Las Cienegas National Conservation Area, which preserves habitat for a variety of threatened plant and animal species in the valley and along Cienega Creek.

The town of Vail, Arizona, is located at the northwestern edge of the valley, next to the Colossal Cave Mountain Park. The small community of Sonoita is located in the southwestern part of the valley, a few miles south of the historic Empire Ranch, which is now used as the headquarters for the Las Cienegas National Conservation Area, as well as a local history museum. The ghost towns of Greaterville, Kentucky Camp, and Total Wreck are located at the western edge of the valley, in the foothills of the Santa Rita and Empire mountain ranges. The ghost town of Pantano is near the valley's northern edge, at the foot of the Rincon Mountains.

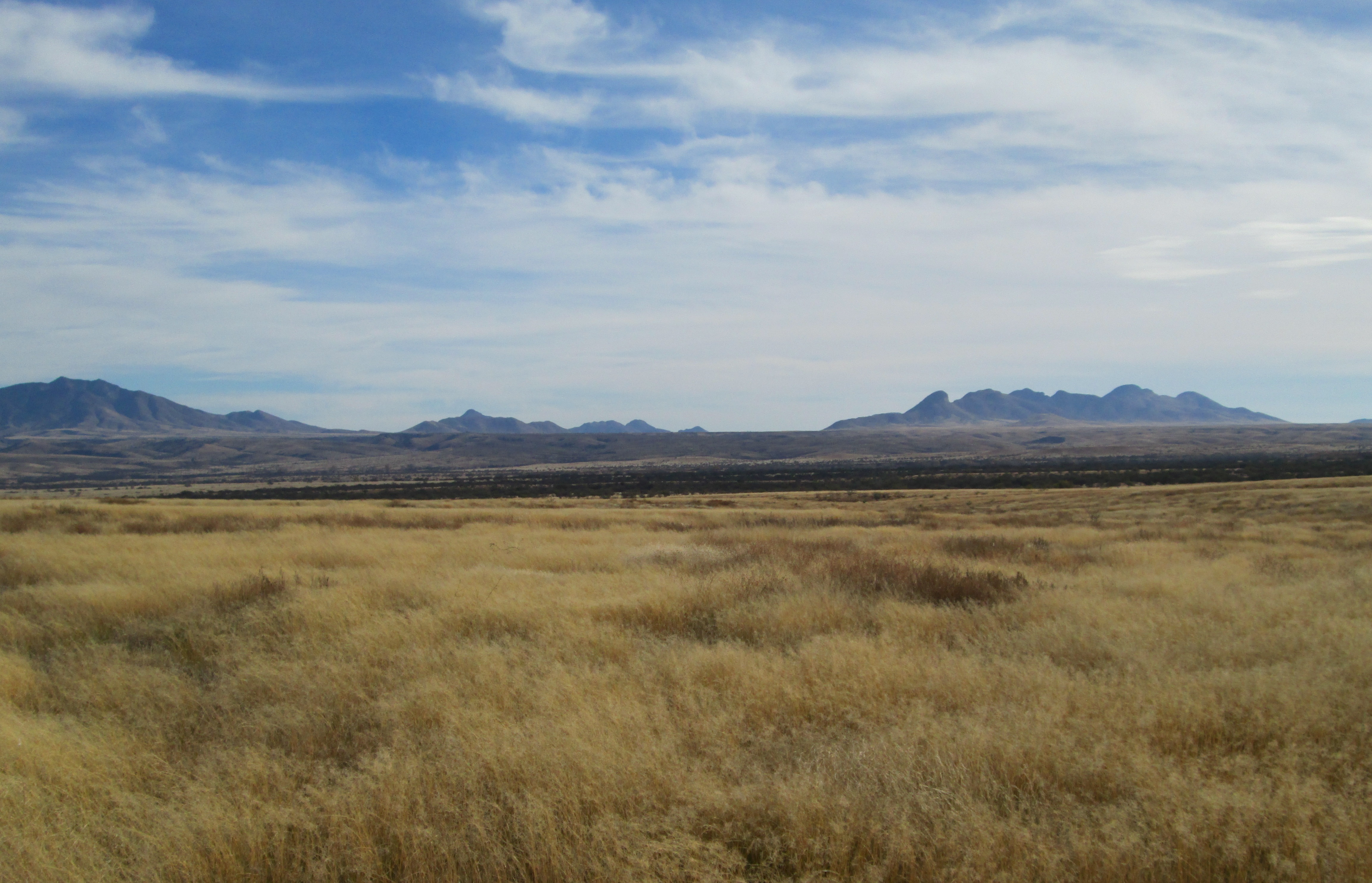
Cienega Valley, with the Whetstones and the Mustang Mountains in the background.

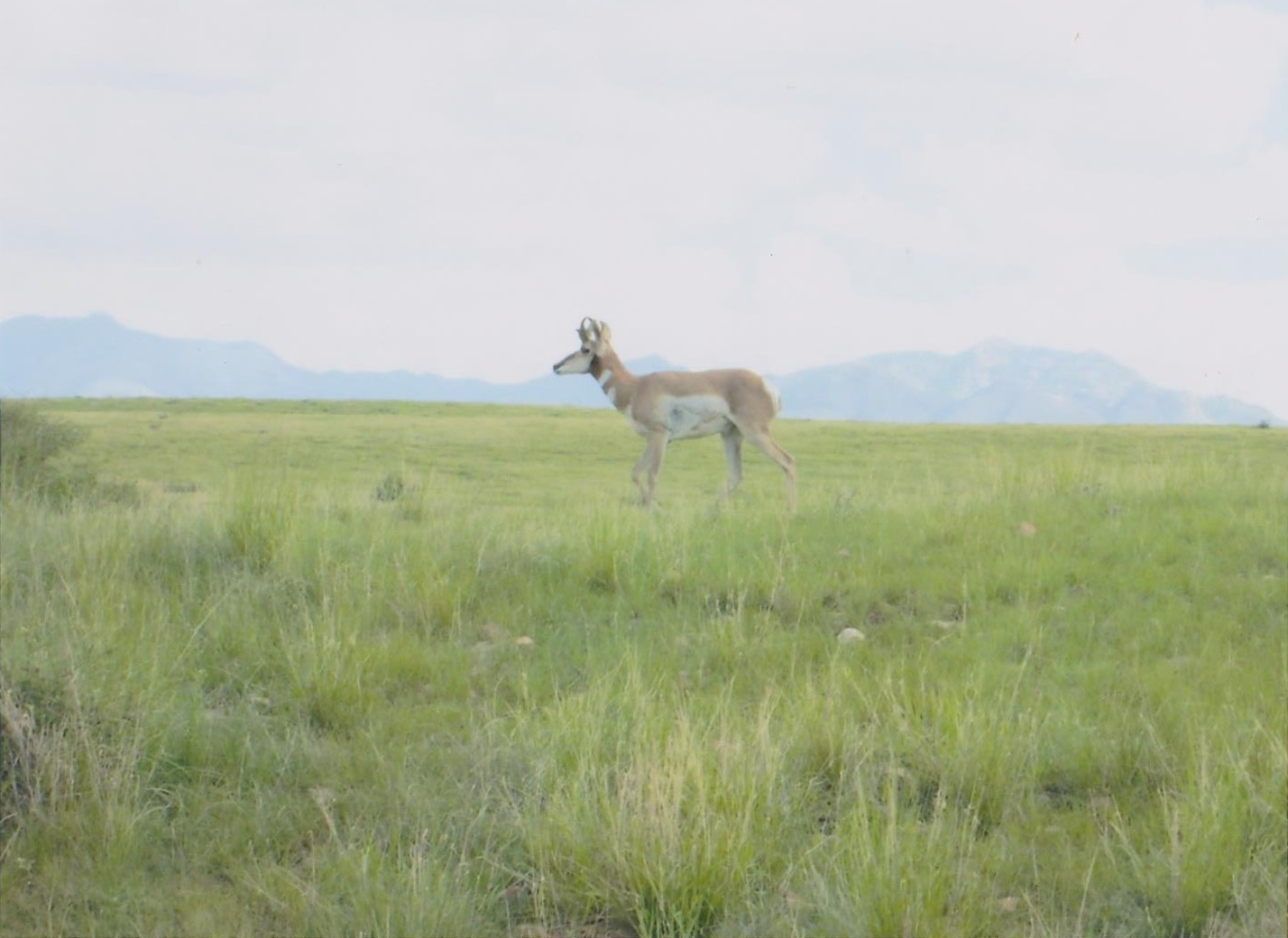
A pronghorn antelope in the Cienega Valley.

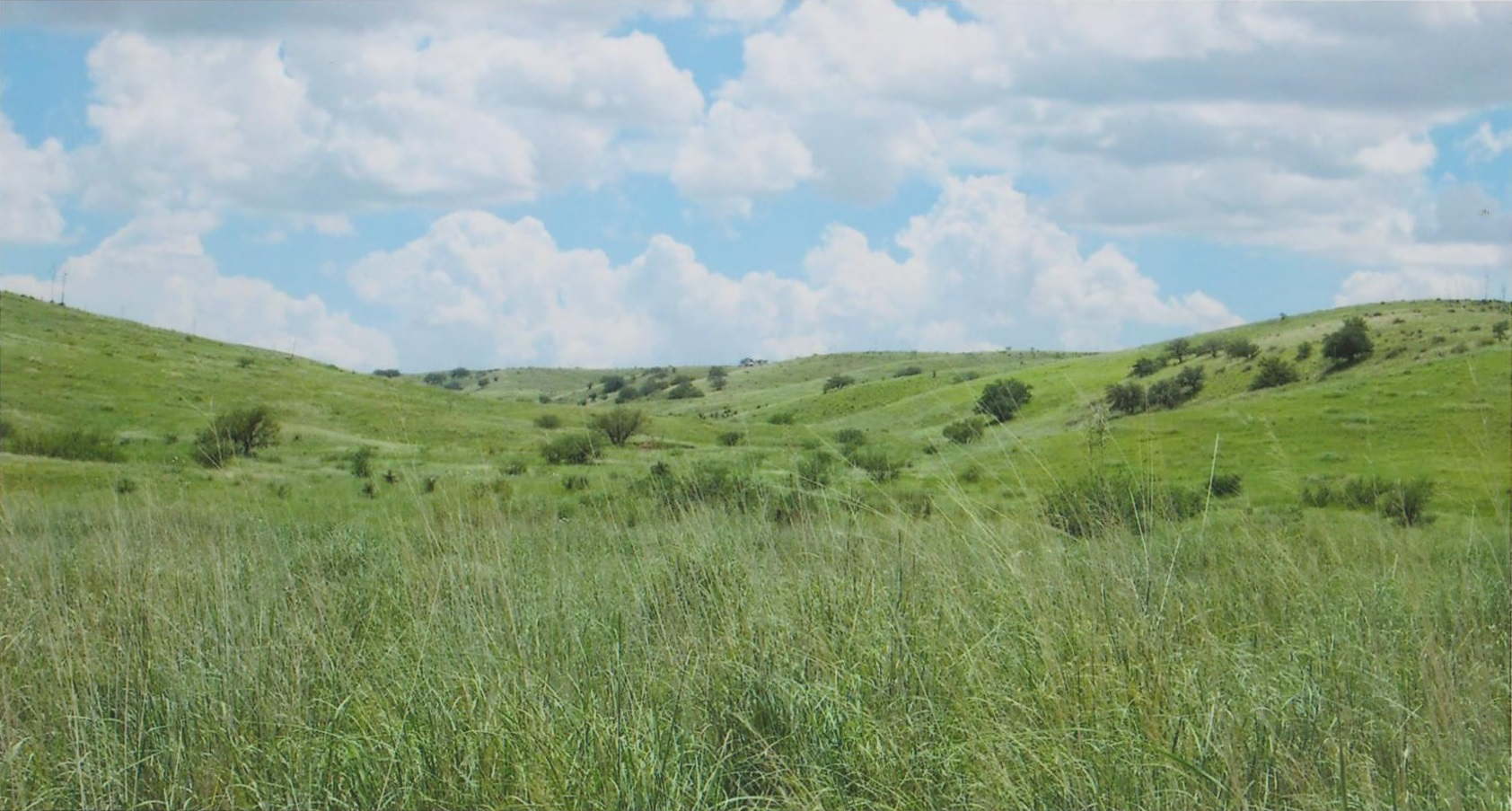
Prairie, green after the summer monsoon.

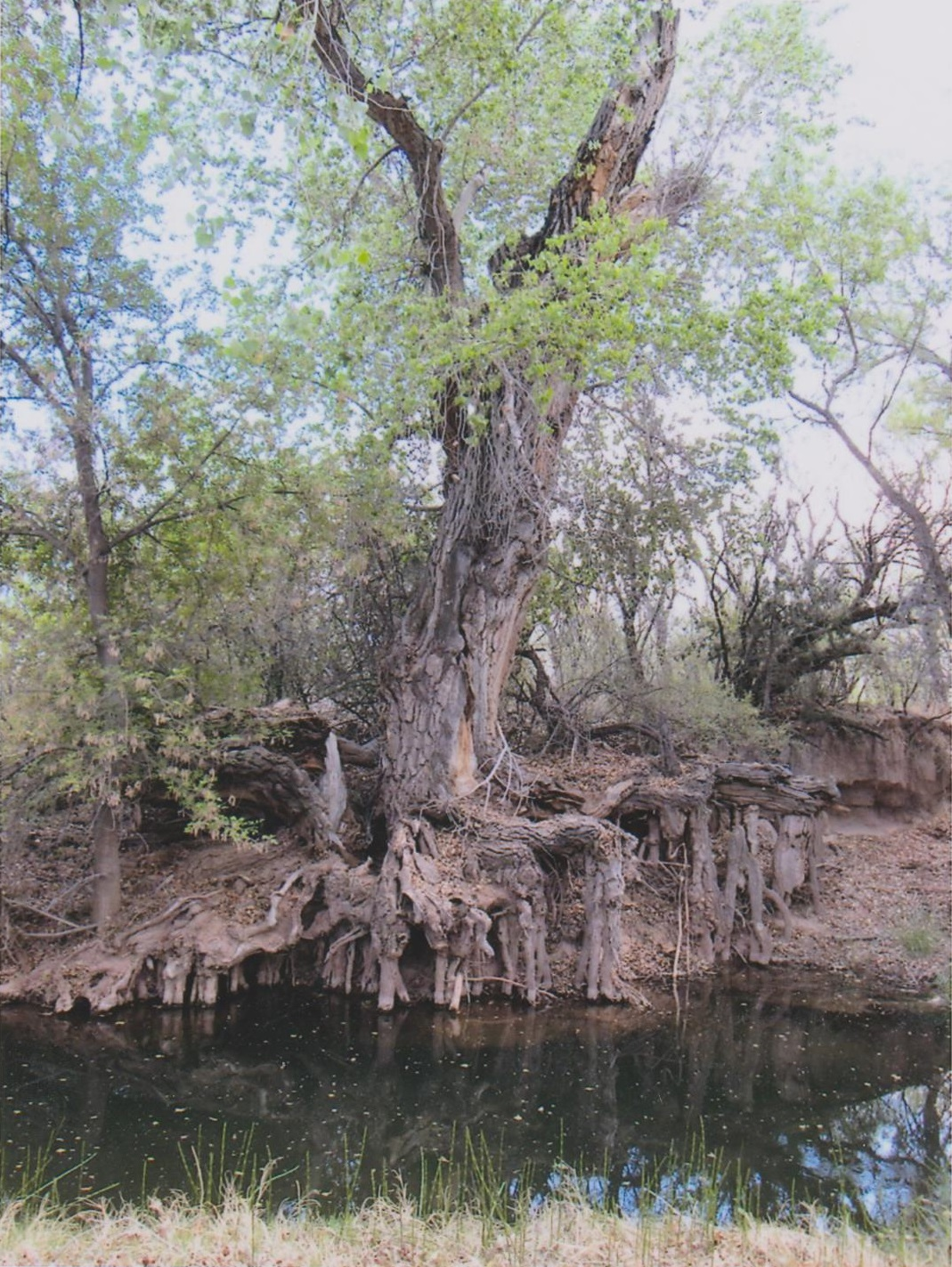
A cottonwood tree along Cienega Creek.

== See also ==
- San Rafael Valley
- Coronado National Forest
