= San Rafael Valley =

Landform in Santa Cruz County, Arizona

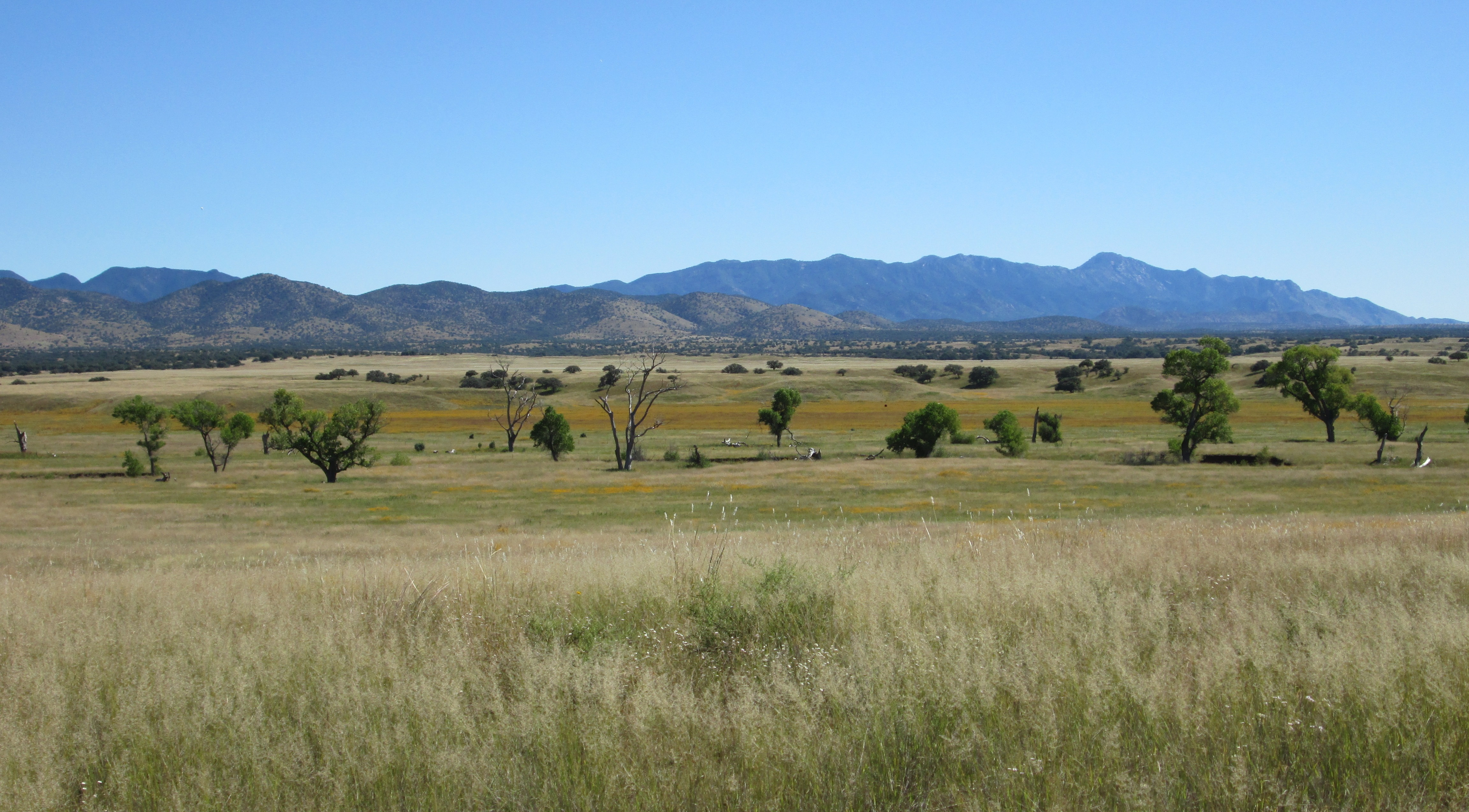
- The San Rafael Valley, facing east toward the Canelo Hills and the Huachuca Mountains.

Geography
- Country: United States
- State: Arizona
- Region: Borderlands
- Communities: Lochiel
- Borders on: Canelo Hills-N; Huachuca Mountains-E; Patagonia Mountains-W
- Coordinates: 31°23′0″N 110°35′2″W
- River: Santa Cruz River
- Interactive map of San Rafael Valley

The San Rafael Valley is a high intermontane grass valley in eastern Santa Cruz County, Arizona. The valley within the borderlands region is bounded to the west by the Patagonia Mountains, to the north and northeast by the Canelo Hills and to the east by the Huachuca Mountains in Cochise County. The valley forms the headwaters of the Santa Cruz River which flows south into Sonora, Mexico just east of the historic Lochiel townsite. The valley is known as an ecologically sensitive area with grasslands and wildlife.

The San Rafael de la Zanja Land Grant lies in the valley center just north of Lochiel. The Nature Conservancy purchased the former land grant ranch in 1998 and Arizona established the "San Rafael State Natural Area" in the valley in 1999 on the southern part of that property. The protected areas are not open to the public. The land grant is privately owned. The State Natural Area is south of the land grant, and borders Mexico. The valley is a crucial migration path for jaguars, ocelots, and other wildlife. In 2008, the San Rafael Ranch headquarters was added to the National Register of Historic Places as the "San Rafael Ranch Historic District".

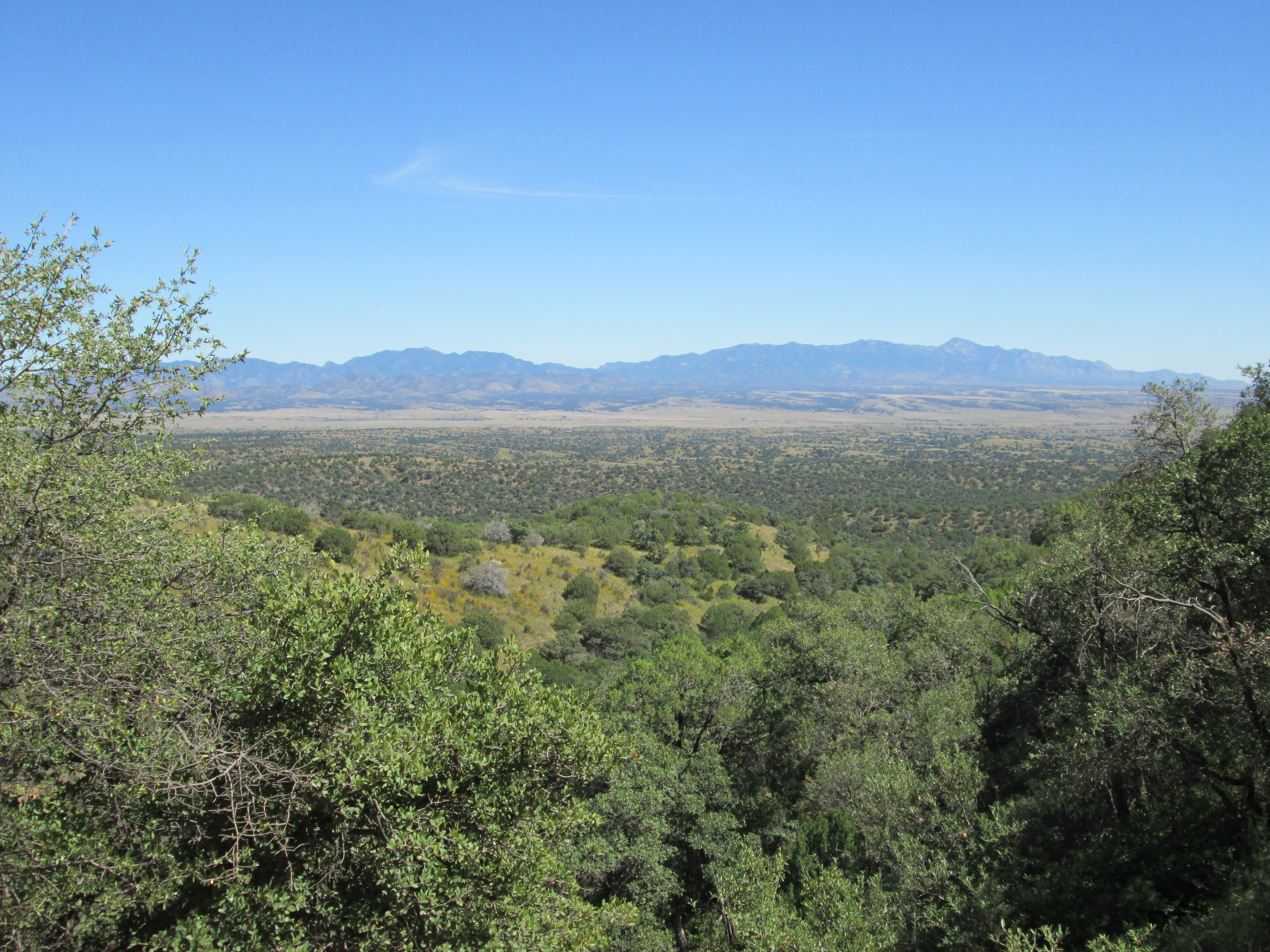
View across the San Rafael Valley towards the Huachuca Mountains.

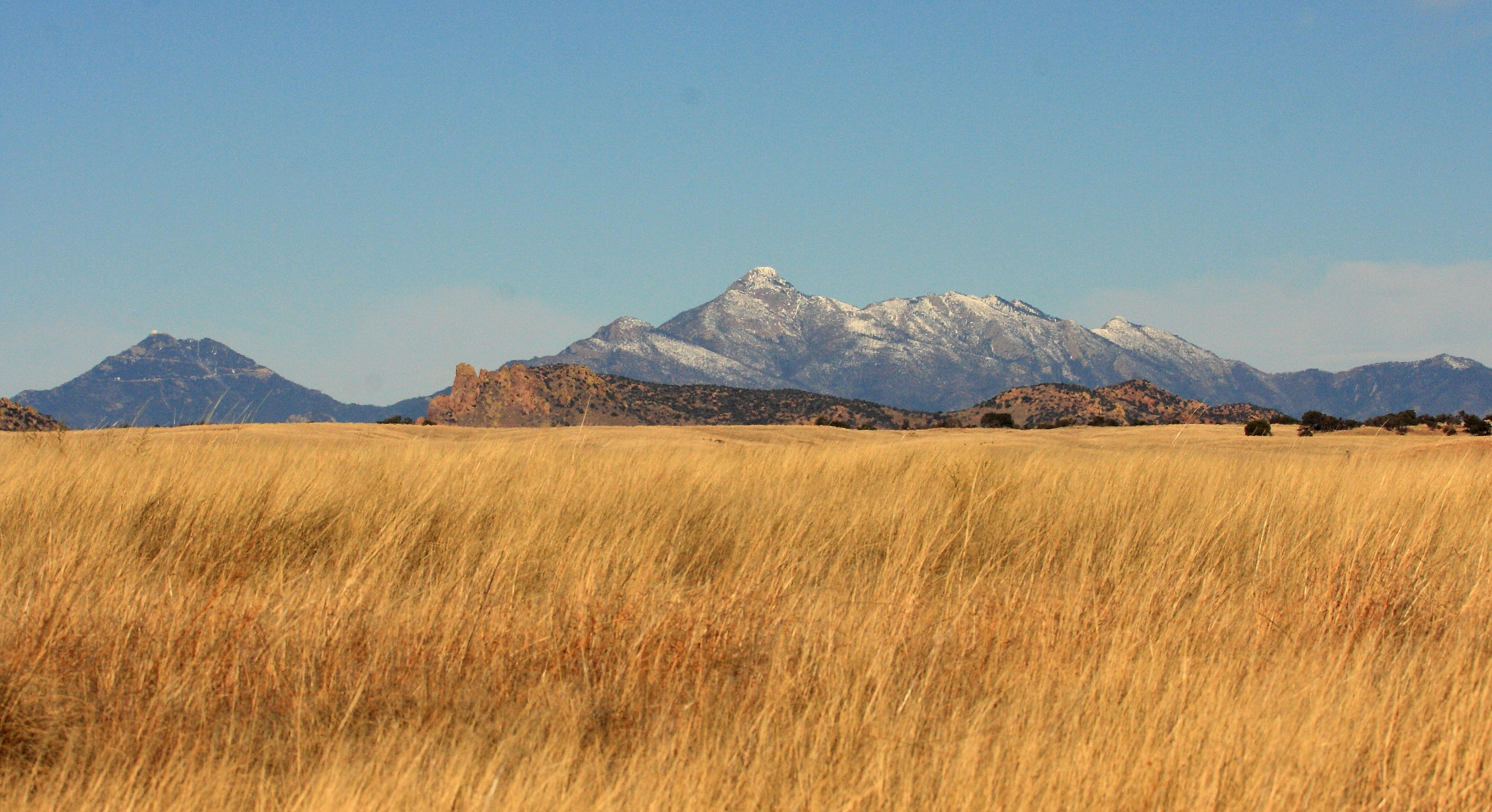
The San Rafael Valley with the Santa Rita Mountains in the background.

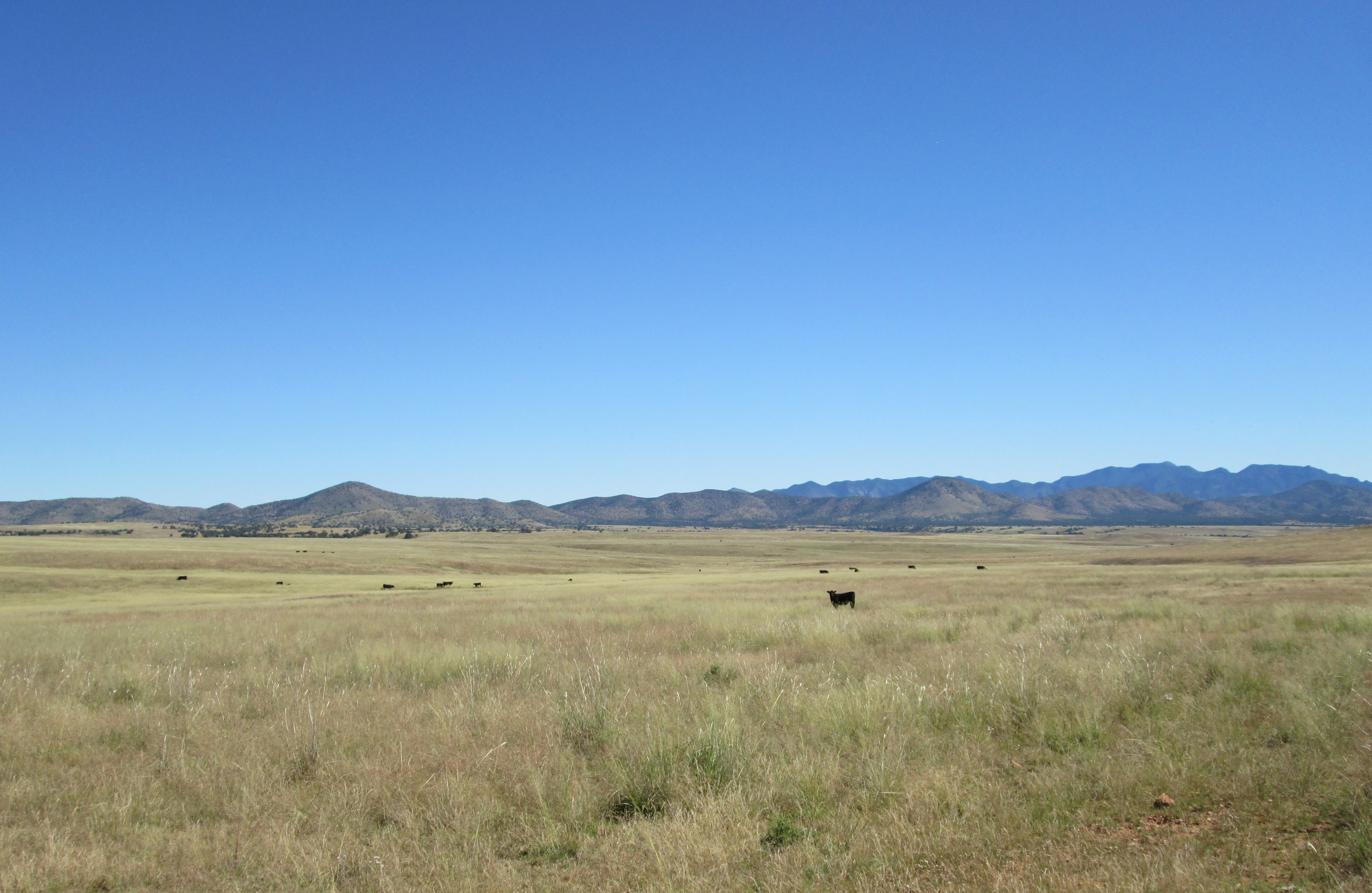
Cattle grazing in San Rafael Valley.

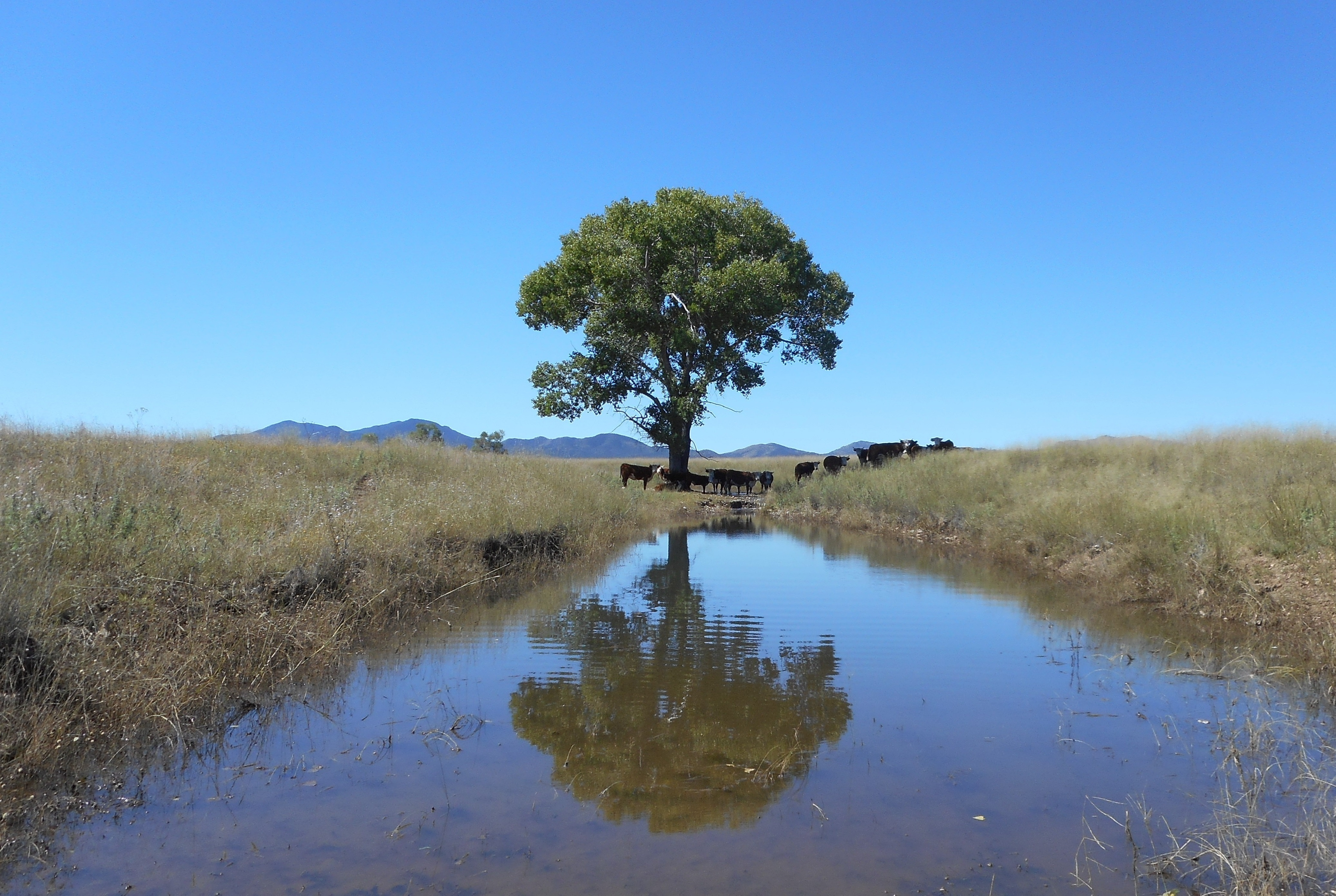
Cattle next to a water tank.

== See also ==
- Cienega Valley (Arizona)
- Sulphur Springs Valley
