= Total Wreck, Arizona =

- Ghost town
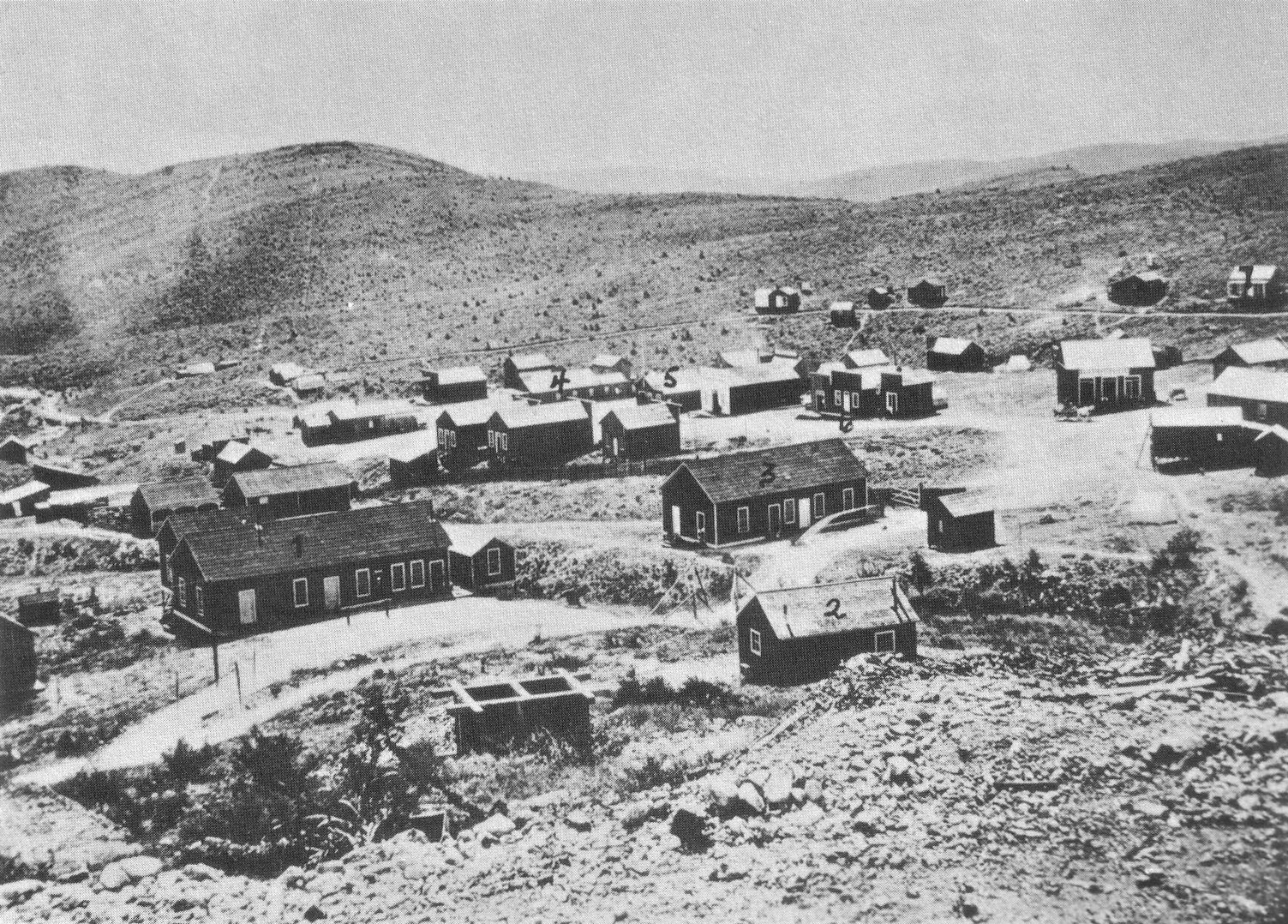
- Total Wreck, c.1885.

- Location within Arizona Location within the United States
- Coordinates: 31°53′44″N 110°35′34″W
- Country: United States
- State: Arizona
- County: Pima
- Founded: 1879
- Abandoned: 1890
- Elevation: 4,629 ft (1,411 m)

Population (2009)
  - Total: 0
- Time zone: UTC-7 (MST (no DST))
- Post Office opened: August 12, 1881
- Post Office closed: November 1, 1890

Total Wreck is a ghost town in Pima County, Arizona. The town was built 7 miles (11 km) from Pantano, Arizona, whence "an excellent road" led from the Southern Pacific Railroad line and on to the Empire Ranch. It lay on the mail route to and from Harshaw.

== Mining ==
Silver was discovered in the Richmond lode of the Empire mining district in the eastern Empire Mountains in 1879. By 1884 mines of the area had produced some $5,000,000 in silver bullion. Mining declined through the 1890s and early 1900s.

== Naming ==
There are two stories about the naming of the town.

- John L. Dillon, the owner of the claims, named the townsite Total Wreck because he thought that the mine was on a ledge that looked like "a Total Wreck" because it was below a quartzite ledge with large boulders of quartzite strewn all over.
- The Los Angeles Times reported in 1882 that the "strange appellation" of Total Wreck came about when "After a laborious search for minerals in the vicinity of the mine, one day previous to its discovery, Mr. Dillon replied to a friend's inquiry of 'What luck?' by saying: 'Oh, it's a total wreck! "

== Business and population ==
A post office was established on August 12, 1881, and was discontinued on November 1, 1890. The population was 200 or 300 residents in 1883, at which time its structures included five saloons, three general stores, a butcher shop, a shoemaker shop and a half dozen Chinese laundries.

A Los Angeles Times reporter wrote in 1882:

The town of Total Wreck has no appearance of a wreck. It is a thrifty, neat-looking village, the streets laid out at right angles. The main street is named Dillon street in honor of the discoverer of the mine, and the first to discover minerals in this district.... The town has two stores, two hotels, a restaurant, five saloons, a carpenter, blacksmith, butcher and shoe-shop; also a dressmaker's store, a brewery and about thirty-five houses.... It has a residential magistrate and a deputy sheriff, and I was informed that in case of trouble with the Indians or roughs ninety men could be mustered within sixty minutes.

Business owners in that year were "N.R. Vail, Salsig & Ballou, Chas. Altschul, A.J.Bobo, Snyder & Co., Nelson & George, P.J. Delahanty, John Vaughn, Alex. Chisholm, S.S. Danner, McClellan & Williams and Mr. Ballou."

== Legends ==
A popular legend of Total Wreck was the story of E. B. Salsig who was involved in a shootout. He was struck in the chest by a bullet from the other assailant, but he didn't die because he was saved by a large pack of love letters he had in his vest pocket. The letters supposedly absorbed the bullet, saving the man's life. Legend says he married the woman who had written the letters.

== Gallery ==
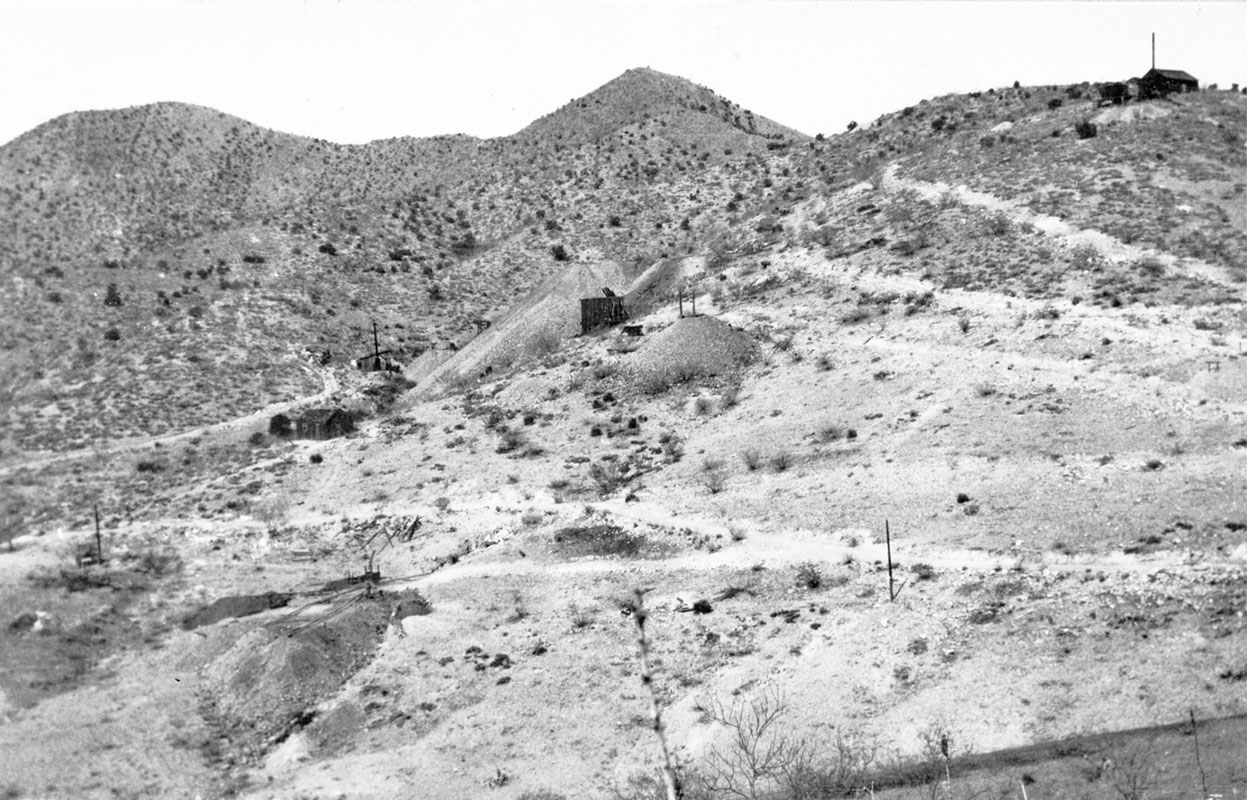
Total Wreck in 1909.

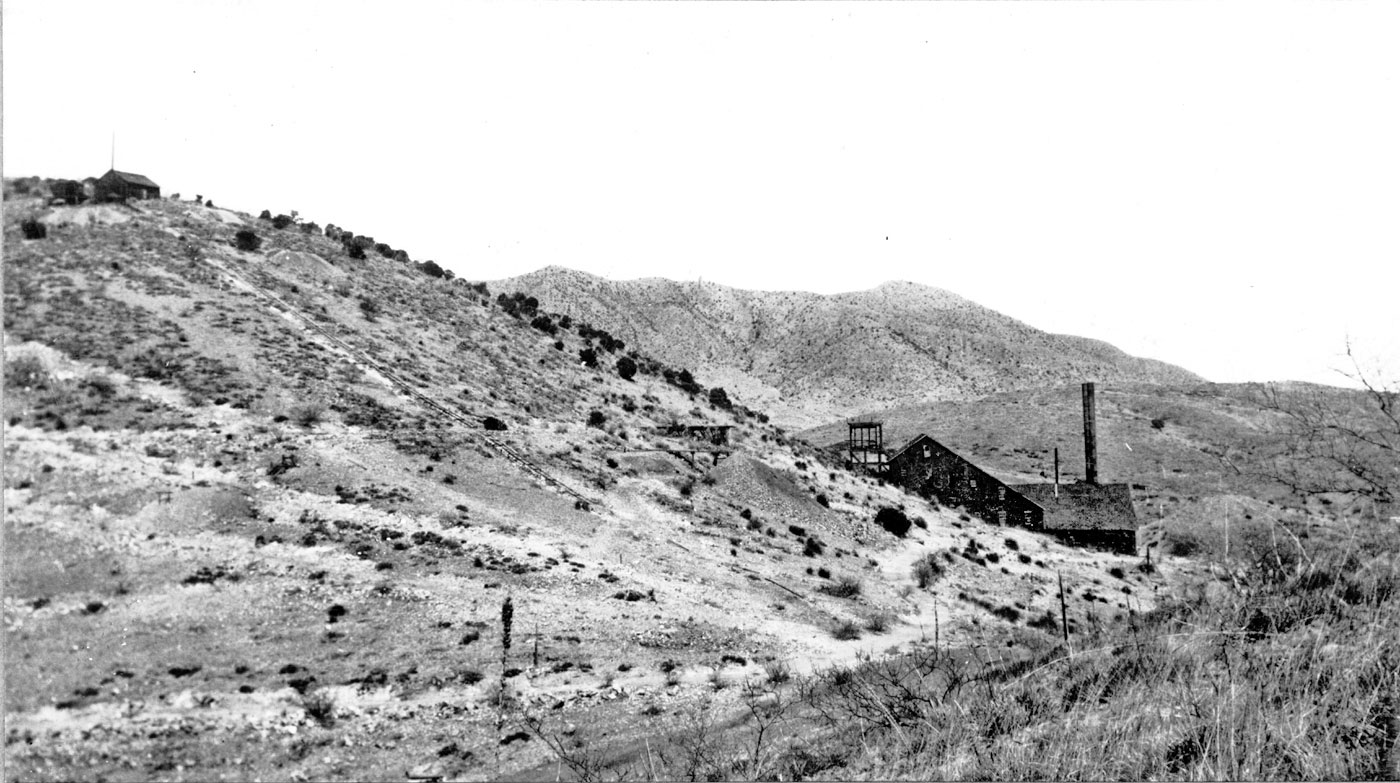
Another view of Total Wreck in 1909.

== See also ==
- List of ghost towns in Arizona
