= Arizona Borderlands =

The Arizona Borderlands are the geographic and cultural region north of the Arizona portion of the US-Mexico border. The area is unique in that it features both an international border and the Tohono O'oham sovereign nation along much of that border. Frequent and persistent topics of interest in the area include the presence of illegal immigration, the confluence of local, state, and national politics surrounding the border, conservation and sustainable living, and the presence of drug traffickers and paramilitary forces in the vicinity.

== Background ==
Arizona's southern border comprises 24% of the entire United States-Mexico Border and contains six of the state's ten Ports of Entry. These ports are of particular importance because significant drug trafficking occurs via drugs hidden in vehicles. Of particular concern are drug trafficking operations used by the Sinaloa Cartel for smuggling meth, cocaine, heroin and marijuana across the border in the United States.

== Tohono O'Odham Nation ==
The Gadsden Purchase in 1854 divided the Tohono O'odham Nation into two pieces across an international border. Seventy-five miles of the southern border of the Tohono O'odham Nation's border coincide with the United States-Mexico border, making it the second largest reservation in the United States. The Tohono O'odham people have lived in this region for thousands of years and frequently need to cross the border to visit family members and sacred sites, typically in northwestern Mexico.

The US border control in the area presented an obstacle to members of the tribe. The passing of the Arizona Borderlands Protection and Preservation Act gave the Department of Homeland Security access to federal lands for security activities. This coupled with the Trump administration's plan to establish a wall along the border, has produced more tension in the region. In order for such a wall to be built without the approval of the Tohono O'odham government, the relevant piece of the land would first have to be removed from the Tohono O'odham Nation's trust, which requires a Congressional bill.

The rocky geography and remote location of the border contained within the Tohono O'odham nation make it infeasible for law enforcement officers to effectively patrol the border, though mounting efforts in the area have created a militarized atmosphere that is disturbing to members of the Tohono O'odham tribe.

== Immigration ==
One of the ways most commonly used to enter the country by the poorest immigrants is on foot through the Sonoran Desert. The trek takes upwards of three days and immigrants face a host of issues while making it. Near the border, temperatures rise into the triple digits during the daytime in the summer months and fall to near freezing during the nighttime in the winter months. Average annual precipitation varies along the border but can be as low as three inches, while rainfall during the North American Monsoon season can be surprising and deadly.

Immigrants attempting to cross the border frequently die making the trek: in 2013, 800 bodies of attempted immigrants were being held in Tucson, Arizona awaiting identification. Immigrants also leave feces, abandoned vehicles, and trash: in a three-year period, more than a quarter million pounds of trash were removed from the area.

A humanitarian organization called No More Deaths works to reduce the deaths of migrants crossing through the desert.

== Drug trafficking ==
Huge desolate areas between the six Ports of Entry found along the Arizona border provide stealthy smuggling routes for large drug operations, using national parks and Indian reservations to push methamphetamine, cocaine, and other drugs across the border. This border provides an easy route to Phoenix and Tucson, which house large-scale organizations responsible for distributing the drugs throughout the U.S. A 2010 report noted an increase in the amount of methamphetamine, heroin, cocaine, and marijuana seized, most notably a 79% in cocaine and a 93% in ice methamphetamine. The report also noted that more than 416,000 kilograms has been smuggled through the Tohono O'Odham reservation, as the reservation is very open to allow unimpeded travel for residents on the reservation.

The reservations are not the only route they use to push their drugs; Mexican cartels also use tunnels to smuggle drugs into Arizona. The amount of tunnels discovered in Arizona is the most out of all the Southern Border states. Many of these tunnels utilize already created drainage tunnels and irrigation systems.

== See also ==
- Grassroots environmental activism in the United States–Mexico borderlands
