= Colossal Cave (Arizona) =

Geologic feature in Pima County, Arizona

Coordinates: 32°03′54″N 110°37′51″W

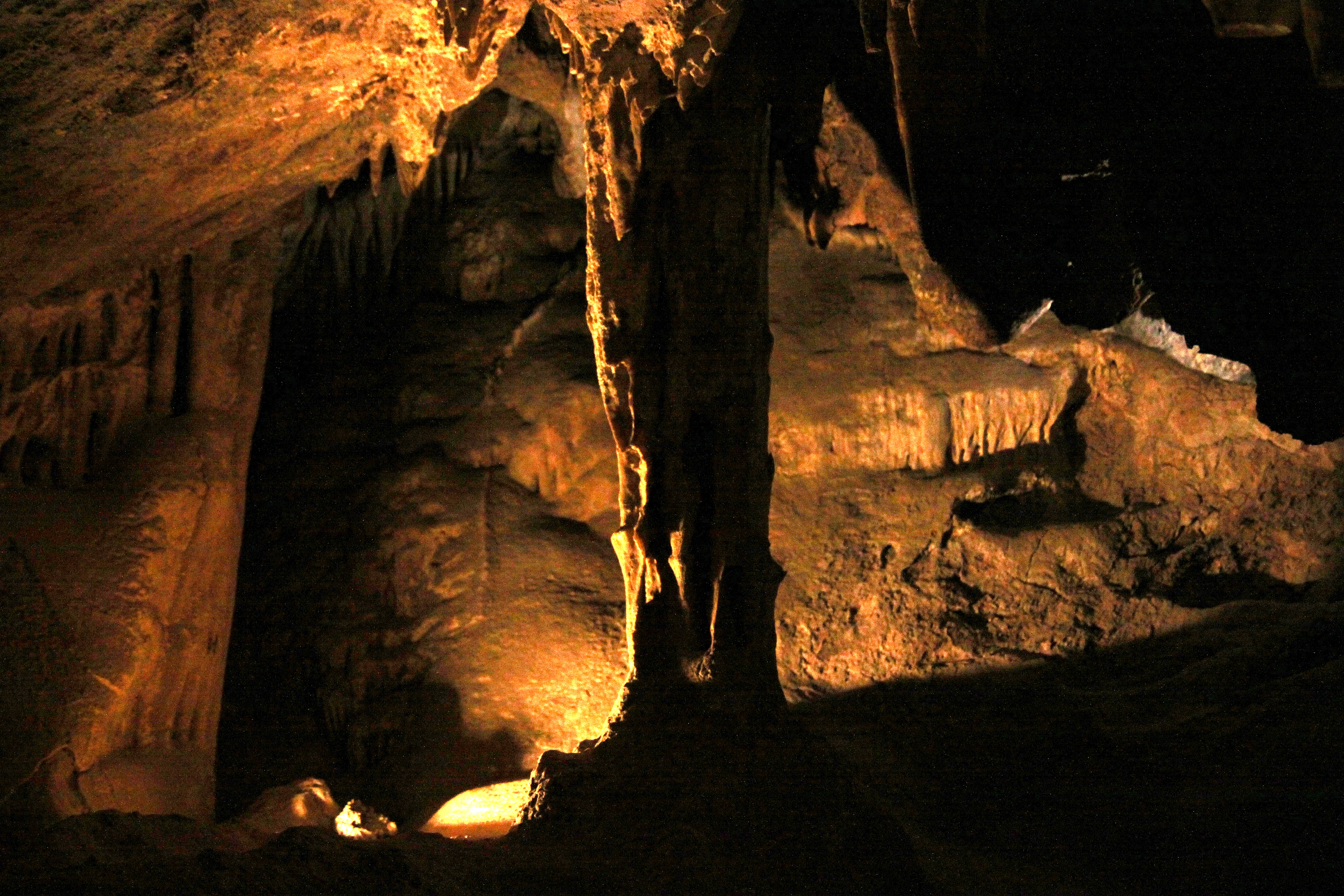
Cave system

Colossal Cave is a cave system in southeastern Arizona, United States, near the community of Vail, about 22 miles (35 km) southeast of Tucson. It contains about 3.9 miles (6.3 km) of mapped passageways. Temperatures inside average 70 °F (21 °C) year-round. Previous names include 'Mountain Springs Cave' and 'Five–Mile Cave'.

The cave is an ancient karst cave, classified as "dry" by guides (though this is not a speleologic term). The meaning of this is that its formations are completely dry, or "dead", and do not grow. This is because the cave was formed by water depositing limestone, but this source has disappeared. It instead feeds the "active" nearby Arkenstone Cave that continues to grow formations. Colossal Cave was used from 900 to 1450 AD by the Hohokam, Sobaipuri, and Apache Indians.

== Early history of Colossal Cave and the Mountain Springs Ranch ==
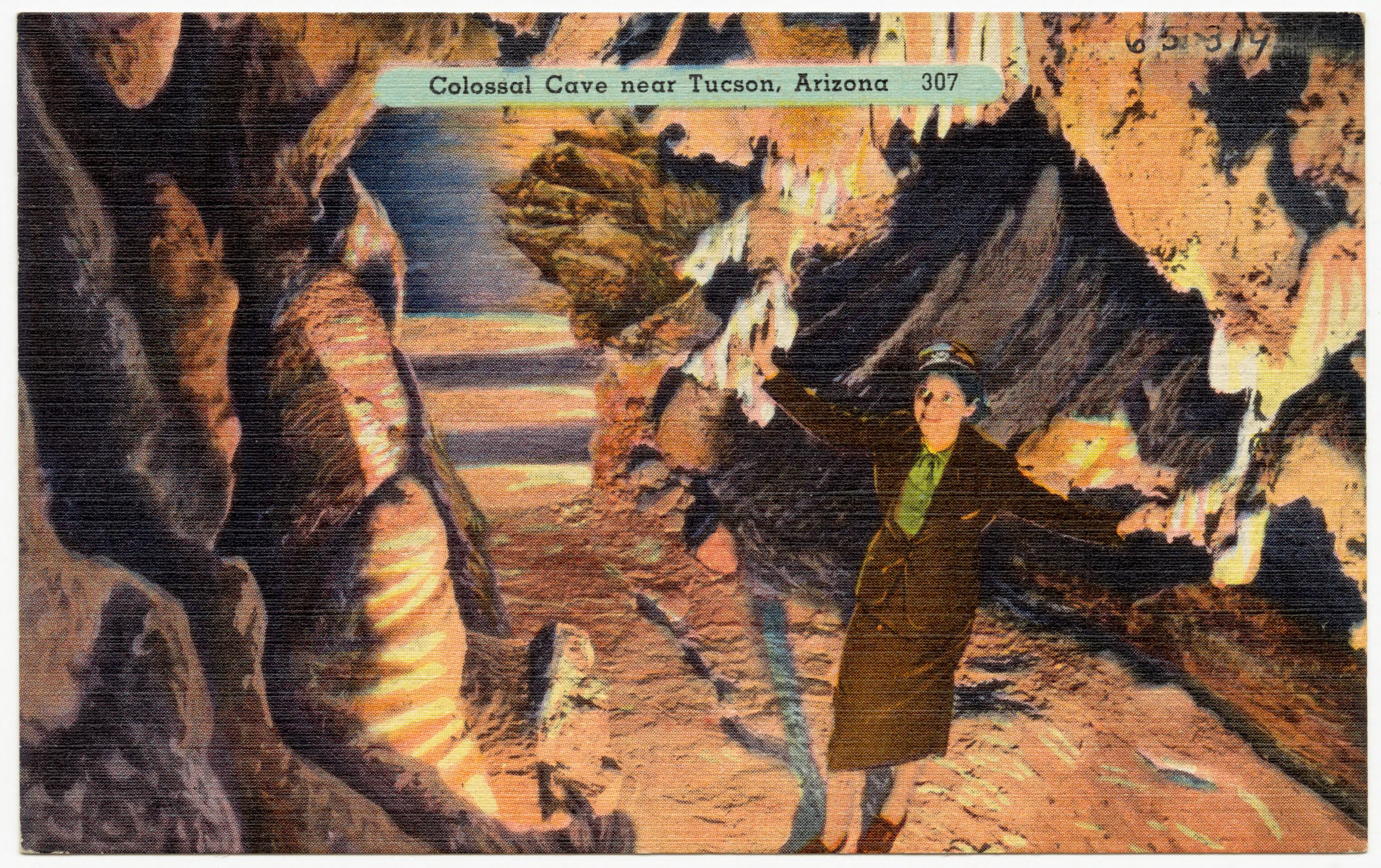
Postcard c. 1940s

In 1876, a man named Sidney H. Ramsey, a native of Louisiana, was owner of the Mountain Springs Station, a stage stop approximately 22 miles east of Tucson, in the foothills of the Rincon Mountains. This station was likely of recent construction because it was along a new road from Tucson to Tres Alamos, a farming community in the San Pedro Valley.

The station was "abundantly supplied with water by a living spring and stream of delicious water and excellent grass and plenty of wood for campers are all about." It also provided "first-rate meals prepared to order...and (was) always supplied with hay and grain."

Within a couple years, E.H. “Hank” Bridwell had taken over the Mountain Springs Ranch, which now included the Mountain Springs Hotel and Mountain Springs Station.

Around 1879, Solomon Lick a former Union soldier and a partner took over the ranch. They advertised it as “The finest summer resort for families and winter resort for hunters and sportsmen in southern Arizona…Mineral springs are nearby and special accommodations are provided for families, there being six excellent rooms, well furnished.” The ranch's dairy provided fresh milk, butter and eggs for the guests.

In January 1879, Lick along with a few companions came across what was believed to be either an old mine or cave with Lick and party exploring this large cavity for about 500 feet from the entrance.

Soon after, an exploration team, guided by candles placed in a small board, visited the cave, with the local newspaper reporting what they had discovered: “An arched entrance three feet wide and four feet high…At the mouth of the cave the air was terribly foul…discovered to be from the large deposits of bat excrement all through the cave…The finding of ashes and other indications of fire, evidently very old..(and) no doubt one of the haunts and resting places of the Apaches…Bones of all kinds lay scattered around, no less than 500 deer antlers being seen and other evidences of life destruction and feasting…They brought out with them many beautiful specimens of stalactites and some fine deer antlers which they brought with them to the city.”

In 1884, the local paper reported that “The Mountain Springs Cave” was still for the most part unexplored and that the greatest distance that had been explored up to this point was a half a mile.

A few years later, this underground chamber is believed to have been used as a hideout by train robbers who held up the Southern Pacific Express, Train Number 20 on two different occasions. On the first heist the men made off with $3,000 in currency and the second time with gold and silver Mexican dollars.

By 1890, William Shaw had taken over the Mountain Springs Ranch and that year, along with soldiers from Fort Lowell explored the cavern for five hours utilizing candles and magnesium wire to illuminate their path through the underground chambers. They were awed by the finger-shaped and kidney-shaped stalactites and stalagmites that occurred in large quantities and the holes that were so deep they could barely hear the rock dropped down when it hit the bottom.

The first decade of the new century saw the formation of an enterprise to excavate the bat guano in the cave which led to the boring of an approximately 75-foot tunnel to access this commodity. It's believed seven carloads were taken and shipped to Los Angeles before it was exhausted.

In the 1910s, a group proposed significant development of the cavern for tourism and also the construction of a railroad spur from nearby Vail but nothing resulted from this effort.

In December 1917, after Jim Westfall and Alfred A. Trippel laid claim to the cave and the land surrounding it, for the possible creation of a tourist attraction, Trippel asked Lynn Hodgson, an amateur spelunker, to explore the cave. After the survey, Hodgson told Trippel that “the cave was colossal,” and Hodgson later claimed this is where the name “Colossal Cave” comes from.

Another possible source, according to Mr. Leighton, was from Byron Cummings of the University of Arizona, who had explored the cave around the same time and may have given it its name.

== Modern history ==
In 2025, cave guides at Colossal Cave conducted a mapping and exploration effort that led to the discovery of previously undocumented passages and rooms which totaled about 0.4 miles (0.64 km). The effort was led by Dalton Carper, who initiated a re-examination of existing cave maps and identified potential extensions beyond areas previously considered dead ends. The exploration resulted in access to new sections of the cave not previously documented since 1987. During the exploration, the team reported finding a chamber containing water, which was notable because the cave had previously been considered a largely dry or “dormant” system. The discovery suggested that parts of the cave may still be influenced by seasonal water flow, such as monsoon rainfall or snowmelt, potentially affecting future speleological activity in the system.

== Colossal Cave Mountain Park ==
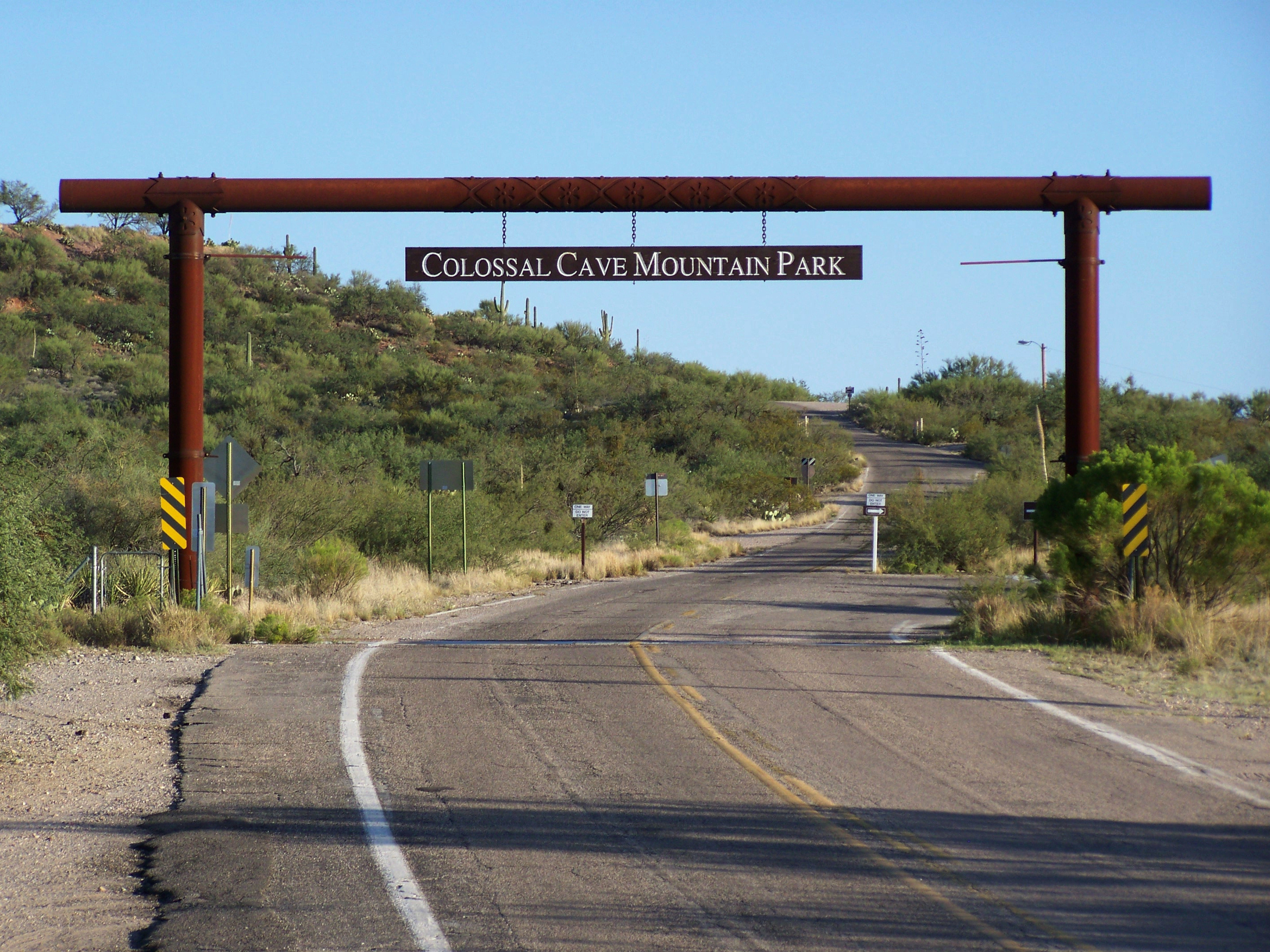
Entry to Colossal Cave Park

Today the cave is a popular tourist destination as part of Colossal Cave Mountain Park. The park also features two other caves, named Arkenstone and La Tetera, which are protected and are being studied by researchers. It is owned by Pima County Natural Resources, Parks and Recreation.

Other park attractions include:

- La Posta Quemada Ranch Museum – exhibits focus on the human history and the natural history of Colossal Cave Mountain Park and the Cienega Corridor region, with special emphasis on the park's caves.
- Civilian Conservation Corps Museum – history of the Civilian Conservation Corps activities in the park
- "The Cowboy" – a bronze sculpture of a cowboy by Buck McCain, reflecting the park's history as a ranch
- Horseback trail rides
- Picnic and camping facilities
- Butterfly garden

== See also ==
- Cienega Valley (Arizona)
