= Grassroots environmental activism in the United States–Mexico borderlands =

The United States–Mexico border, also referred to as the borderlands, has received mass media coverage ranging from political concerns to economic and social issues by the United States and Mexico alike. For both countries, the borderlands represents a point of contention that is often subject to heightened scrutiny.

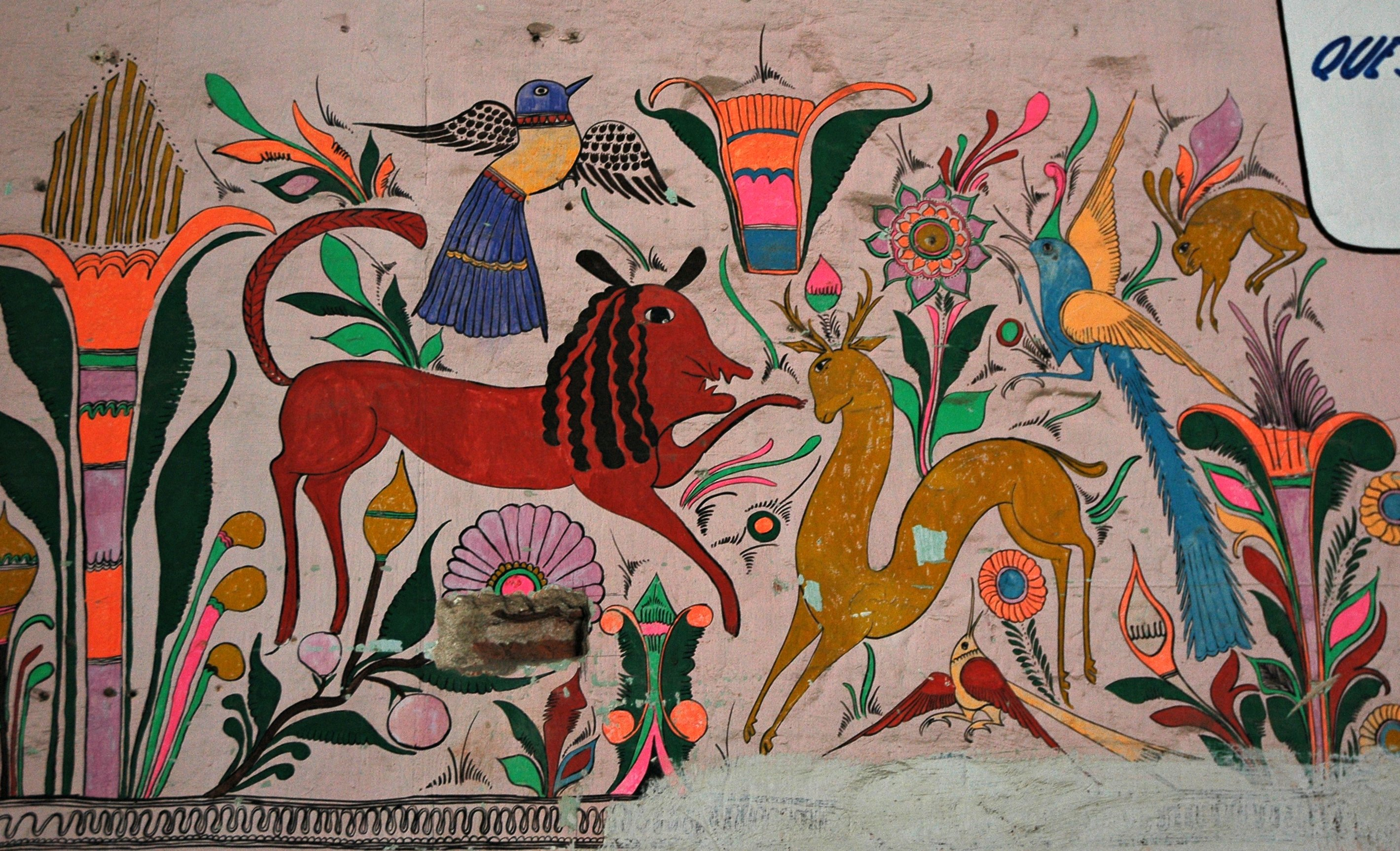
Antique Mexican painting of a lion, deer, bird, and rabbit illustrates country's biodiversity.

As new infrastructure has been developed throughout the region, for purposes including transportation and national security programs, questions involving its impact on the environment has grown. This discussion coincides with the rise in environmental justice campaigns and ongoing research that concerns pollution exposure and its relationship to race and class. As global organizations address environmental issues in the borderlands, grassroots programs continue to assist their efforts through local means.

The Mexico U.S. borderlands have shown various complications on Both sides. These complications are part of the reason why activism occurs. Environmental factors influence people and animals, as well as the environment itself. The borderlands cause impacts on the environment with the construction of the border wall. The border climate is dry with some rain, with limited water resources. The border region itself isn't necessarily with one country, it has its own identity and culture. Both sides of the border share the same complications with the border and its building. Both sides of the border possess the need for water, droughts and dried riverbeds have been especially present on the Mexican side, and has affected farmers with a lack of irrigation water this causes difficulties for the socio-economic evolution of this region. Although there have been efforts for solutions, such as focusing on desalination plants and water transfers for the people in these regions that are in need of solutions for their water quality, these solutions have produced other complications such as tire and sedimentation flows into beaches in both Mexico and U.S., protected areas, and untreated sewage. Animals carry the toll of these environmental impacts, 75%, of animals that are not part of the protected land and native to Mexico are divided from the rest of their species outside the borders of Mexico in the U.S. This divide creates an unnatural living for them. These environmental impacts not only show a link to wildlife, but for humans as well, there is a connection between those that experience water insecurity and anxiety, depression and emotional psychosocial distress.

== Background ==
Environmental activism can be characterized by support for environmental and social health and well-being. With the expansion of academic research and policy-making surrounding concerns for climate change, environmental justice has also become increasingly prevalent surrounding the language of activism. As movements have continued to develop, more research has been produced at the national level to consider the relationship between race, socioeconomic level, and the amount of pollution present in particular areas. In 2010, a Toxic Release Inventory report on North Carolina from the national database determined there was a relationship between the population density of people of color and the intensity of emissions at chemical plants.

Research on the correlation between larger populations of people of color and increased amounts of emissions across the United States has contributed to the growth of environmental justice movements in non-white communities. Environmental concerns are also prominent in spaces outside of the United States, including in borderlands along the continental U.S. where crises associated with climate change have implicated Latinx communities especially.

Environmental justice in the U.S.-Mexico borderlands has been influenced by the growing industrialization of the region, particularly since the development of the North Atlantic Free Trade Agreement and its revision into the United States–Mexico–Canada Agreement. Increasing globalization on the border has contributed to growing concerns for environmentalism by Latinx communities. The globalization of the environmental justice movement further develops more difficulties in understanding local discourse on conversations of environmental injustice, especially considering regional specifics for places like the borderlands. As Latinx communities continue to advocate for environmental restoration, especially at the U.S.-Mexico border, grassroots organizations have proliferated to develop sustainable programs of advocacy.

== Industrialization and globalization in the borderlands ==
Borderland environmental justice is shaped by socio-economic and governing conditions in the region, and globalization has operated as a contributing factor affecting social, political, and economic concerns. Globalization has increasingly resulted in peripheral countries, including Mexico, to provide materials and workers for projects in countries like the United States. Therefore, concerns of environmental activism are linked to global movements of work and production which support Western powers. The North Atlantic Free Trade Agreement (NAFTA) is one such example of how industrial growth through methods of globalization contributed to overpopulation and militarization of the U.S.-Mexico borderland. Increased industrialization led to ecological destruction in the region from larger concentrations of factories, resulting in pollution and diminished water quality. Disruptions in biodiversity and more environmental hazards from inadequate sewage systems encouraged Latinx advocacy groups to address concerns at the border especially.

During the 1970s, the number of factories in Mexico grew from 72 to 620 by the end of the decade. Increased animosity with the United States became apparent as most factories were owned by U.S. corporations and products were imported from Mexico to the states. Industrialization resulting from larger globalized projects has been cited as a cause of pollution and environmental degradation in the borderlands, further developing tensions between the United States and Mexico.

Latinx communities have been increasingly affected by issues of pollution and subsequent climate change. The 1921 flood in San Antonio, for example, is attributed more to climate change rather than it being a product of a natural disaster, and Latinx communities have criticized White and middle-class groups for their role played in the ecological disruption of historically Latinx regions.

== Environmental Challenges in the Borderlands ==
=== Water ===
An impactful issue at the U.S-Mexico border is water scarcity. A 2024 study on community surveys found that over half of respondents in the region identified water scarcity as the region's primary water concern. Communities also identified water contamination, poor infrastructure, water access, and flooding as additional concerns. This is representative that water concerns in the borderlands is not just the quantity of water, but also the quality. When asked about the cause for these water-related challenges, 75% of respondents listed inadequate financing, while 65% listed fragmentation of responsibility. Infrastructure issues were also apparent and (while existing on both sides of the border) were more commonly reported in informal communities on the Mexican side. The authors emphasize that focusing on these localized water insecurities can allow for less problems experienced by localized communities. In particular, helpful methods could include expanded community knowledge and stakeholder agreements.

Some efforts to resolve the water environmental hazards have come from community mapping projects. One project called "Mapeo Comunitario de la Zona Alamar” in Tijuana, Mexico between Colectivo Salud y Justicia Ambiental and Red de Ciudadanos por el Mejoramiento de las Comunidades (RECIMEC) used community mapping to discover water contamination as well as other environmental hazards in the regional area. The mapping project influenced the city's land use planning processes and interconnected knowledge between the community residents and governmental agencies in urban planning activity.

=== Air Quality ===
Air pollution is a concern in border communities, especially due to heavy transportation activity. Emissions from vehicle exhaust and industrial sites located at ports of entry can affect air quality in surrounding neighborhoods. For example, a study in San Ysidro, California found that black carbon and ultrafine particles were higher in concentration at the San Ysidro Port of Entry. Black carbon concentrations also increased as vehicle wait time increased.

=== Agriculture and Farmworker Justice ===
Agricultural workers in the border region are susceptible to environmental health and safety hazards such as extreme heat, respiratory issues, pesticide exposure, and physical exhaustion. Furthermore, language barriers and immigration status can lead to difficulties in workplace health care services. Research has also found that working in extreme conditions along with other factors such as long hours, separation from family, and lack of job security has led to negative psychological effects on the well-being of farmworkers. Research conducted on the Arizona-Sonora border suggested a binational approach to help improve the status of farmworkers in the border region. This approach suggests the institutionalization of agricultural labor standards on all sides of the border, confirming accessible healthcare for all workers, and creating social responsibility across agricultural companies to ensure a good well-being of the farmworkers.

== Environmental Policies ==
=== La Paz Agreement ===
On August 14, 1983 the United States and Mexico signed an agreement on the "cooperation for the protection and improvement of the environment in the border area". This agreement established the policy framework for the U.S and Mexico to collaborate on all environmental issues (especially land, air, and water pollution) occurring within 100 kilometers (or 62 miles) within the border line. Both countries are responsible for developing programs, scientific resources, environmental monitoring plans, and exchanging information in their respective areas. The information discovered by both countries is exchanged annually at a planned meeting time. However, the agreement is not binding and either party can leave the agreement at anytime with the withdrawal taking place officially after 6 months.

=== Border Environmental Programs ===
After the La Paz Agreement, in 2021 the U.S. Environmental Protection Agency (EPA) and Mexico’s Ministry of the Environment and Natural Resources (SEMARNAT) collaborated to reduce environmental and public health risks among border communities. The 2025 initiative (Border 2025) has four specific goals: reduce air pollution, improve water quality, promote sustainable materials and waste management as well as clean sites, and improve joint preparedness and response to hazardous environmental emergencies. The action plan for these goals includes the development of policy workgroups, regional coordinators, and special task forces.

== Latinx environmental justice organizations ==
=== Colectivo Salud y Justicia Ambiental AC ===
This program, translated to "Collective Health and Environmental Justice AC", is a sister organization of the Environmental Health Coalition. Based in Tijuana, Mexico since 1993, the group is composed primarily of women and young adult activists and volunteers. The primary mission of Colectivo Salud y Justicia Ambiental AC is to promote community-building with the environment in mind, especially by advocating for development that is free from contamination.

The program's missions include eliminating strong toxins that affect citizens and homes, empowering communities with educational materials, and creating sustainable project planning. Based in Northwestern Mexico near the border of California, the group's projects include advocating for environmental policy initiatives that bolster environmentally friendly practices through alternative and sustainable means. One recent plan is part of a grant from Frontera 2025, an environmental program initiated with the U.S. Environmental Protection Agency. This project is dedicated to analyzing pollution in Río Alamar to build on plans that clean and rehabilitate the local area. Collective Salud y Justice Ambiental AC also strives to engage local residents on preventing litter from entering important waterways.

=== Borderlands Restoration Network ===
The Borderlands Restoration Network works with partnering organizations to establish healthier ecosystems along the U.S.-Mexico border. The network's partnerships include the Cuenca Los Ojos Foundation that began in the 1980s with the goal of supporting the biodiversity of the Madrean Archipelago. Founded by Ron Pulliam, the organization has some Latinx representation in each of its administrative branches and works with groups that serve conservation areas extending from Mexico to the southwestern United States.

The network also advocates for restorative economies that seek to expand sustainable rather than extractive activities. As such, some of its projects include seed nurseries and wildlife preserves in Patagonia, Arizona. Education and outreach are similarly valued, especially through its Borderlands Earth Care Youth initiative which supports diverse, young people living in the U.S.-Mexico borderlands through fieldwork and community empowerment as well as its Women Grow Food (WGF) program that supports women and girls in collecting food through greenhouse facilities.

=== Pronatura Noroeste ===
Pronatura Noroeste was founded in 1991 as part of the oldest conservation program in Mexico. The organization works with scientific tools and organizations at all levels of government to support the native ecology and communities in the region. Many of Pronatura Noroeste's offices are in northwest Mexico, and the group's focus remains on the conservation of wildlife and ecosystems of the region as a whole.

Its recent projects include shorebird conservation during winter seasons and studying bird migrations of least terns near Baja California with the MOTUS monitoring network. Marine monitoring is also an important part of Pronatura Noroeste's projects, as the waters in the Gulf of California make Northwest Mexico the habitat of many fish and crustaceans. Similarly, the economy of red sea urchins for people living in Northwest Mexico makes its biological research important for local communities.

Marine, coastal, and wetland ecosystem conservation compose much of the organization's ecological advocacy. Along with the scientific projects that the group invests in, Pronatura Noroeste also supports local community-building at conservation sites. The organization ultimately seeks to aid Indigenous and underserved populations by monitoring and preserving forested regions that they rely on.

=== GreenLatinos ===
GreenLatinos is an organized community of Latinx leaders that aims to address climate change through environmental conservation efforts. While not focused on the U.S.-Mexico border itself, the organization has contributed to projects that address Mexican American communities living in the borderlands, including their work with the National Parks Conservation Association to create a national historic site for the Blackwell School in commemoration of Latinx segregation during the Jim Crow era.

Some of GreenLatinos' policy priorities include clean air initiatives and education programs. Its recent Climate Justice and Clean Air program successfully launched a virtual collective for partners to join online campaigns. The program also serves as a leader in the Methane Partners Campaign to hold the Environmental Protection Agency (EPA) in the United States accountable for passing strict rules regarding methane to protect local communities.

Unlike other organizations, while the organization is open to anyone joining its working group, it prioritizes people in Latinx-led organizations and those who live in largely Latinx communities. As a result, many of its team and board members identify as Latinx or are closely associated with predominately Latinx regions, unlike other environmental programs that serve the population.
