= Vail, Arizona =

CDP in Pima County, Arizona

- CDP
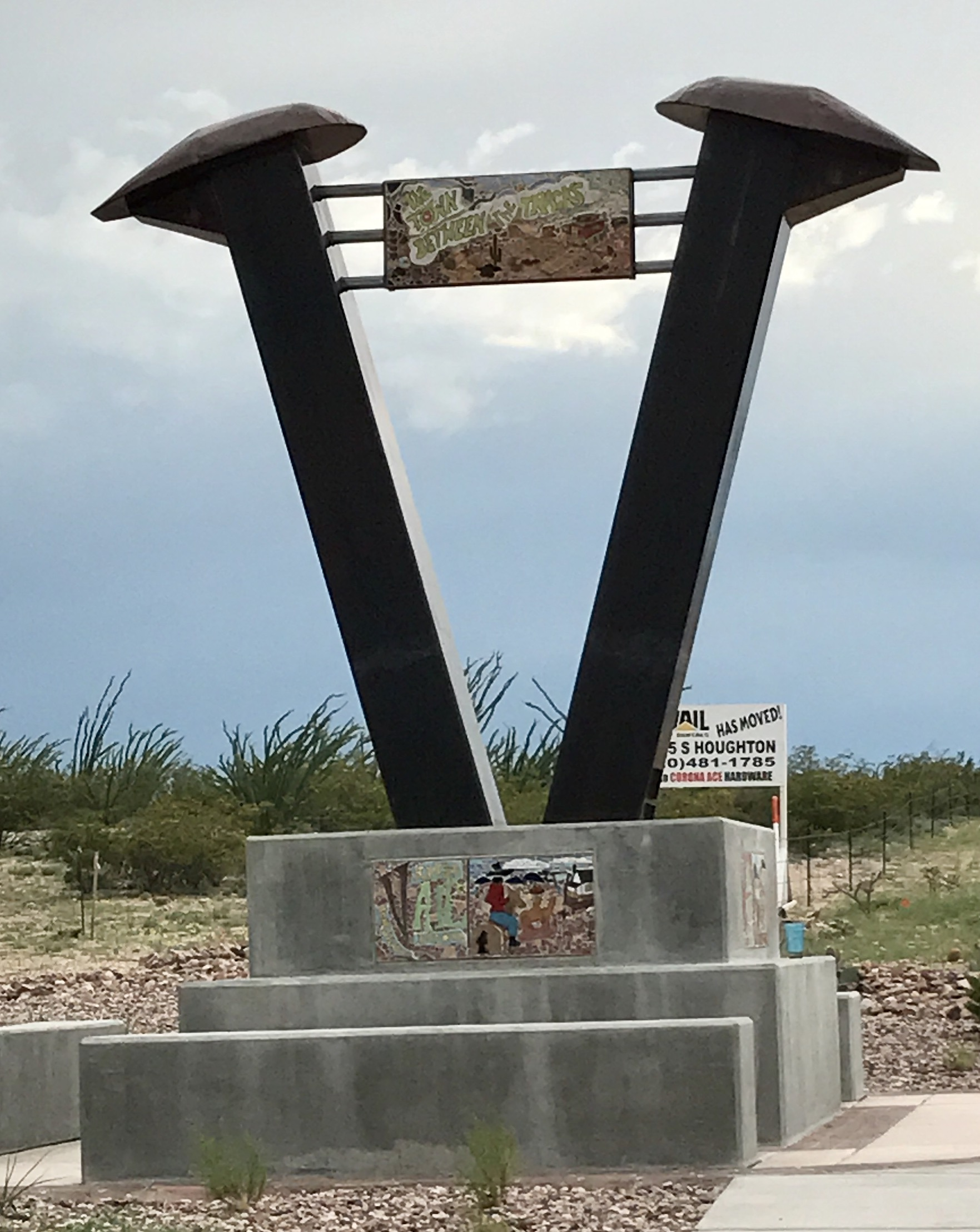
- Vail sign made of 2 large railroad spikes forming a V

- Location in Pima County and Arizona

- Location within Arizona Location within the United States
- Coordinates: 32°0′7″N 110°42′1″W
- Country: United States
- State: Arizona
- County: Pima

Area
  - Total: 22.68 sq mi (58.73 km^{2})
  - Land: 22.68 sq mi (58.73 km^{2})
  - Water: 0 sq mi (0.00 km^{2})
- Elevation: 3,238 ft (987 m)

Population (2020)
  - Total: 13,604
  - Density: 599.9/sq mi (231.62/km^{2})
- Time zone: UTC-7 (MST, no DST)
- ZIP code: 85641
- Area code: 520
- FIPS code: 04-78540
- GNIS feature ID: 13150

Vail is a census-designated place (CDP) in Pima County, Arizona, United States. It is 24 miles (39 km) southeast of Tucson. The population was 10,208 at the 2010 census, up from 2484 in the 2000 census. The area is known for the nearby Colossal Cave, a large cave system, and the Rincon Mountains District of Saguaro National Park, a top tourism spot within Arizona.

Vail was originally a siding and water stop on the Southern Pacific Railroad. It was located on the last section of flat land before the train tracks followed the old wagon road into the Cienega Creek bed. Vail was named after pioneer ranchers Edward and Walter Vail, who established ranches in the area in the late 19th century. Vail deeded a right of way across his ranch to the railroad. Vail owned the Vail Ranch, his brother Walter Vail owned the nearby Empire Ranch, now part of the Las Cienegas National Conservation Area. Attempts to incorporate the town were defeated in 2013 and 2023.

== Geography ==
Vail is located at 32°0′7″N 110°42′1″W (32.001939, -110.700286).

According to the United States Census Bureau, the CDP has a total area of 18.2 square miles (47 km^{2}), all land.

== Demographics ==
Historical population
Census	Pop.	Note	%±
2020	13,604		—
U.S. Decennial Census

=== 2020 census ===
As of the 2020 census, Vail had a population of 13,604. The median age was 40.7 years. 26.6% of residents were under the age of 18 and 16.6% of residents were 65 years of age or older. For every 100 females there were 101.9 males, and for every 100 females age 18 and over there were 100.8 males age 18 and over.

54.5% of residents lived in urban areas, while 45.5% lived in rural areas.

There were 4,763 households in Vail, of which 37.5% had children under the age of 18 living in them. Of all households, 67.0% were married-couple households, 12.5% were households with a male householder and no spouse or partner present, and 14.8% were households with a female householder and no spouse or partner present. About 16.1% of all households were made up of individuals and 7.7% had someone living alone who was 65 years of age or older.

There were 5,024 housing units, of which 5.2% were vacant. The homeowner vacancy rate was 1.3% and the rental vacancy rate was 7.1%.

Racial composition as of the 2020 census
Race	Number	Percent
White	9,981	73.4%
Black or African American	412	3.0%
American Indian and Alaska Native	115	0.8%
Asian	297	2.2%
Native Hawaiian and Other Pacific Islander	36	0.3%
Some other race	806	5.9%
Two or more races	1,957	14.4%
Hispanic or Latino (of any race)	3,136	23.1%

=== 2010 census ===
As of the census of 2010, there were 10,208 people residing in Vail, Arizona (a 248% increase from 2000). The population density was 561.2 people per square mile. According to the census, Vail is 69.8% non-Hispanic white, 3.3% Black or African American, 0.9% Native American, 2.4% Asian, 0.2% Pacific Islander, 5.0% from other races, and 4.1% were mixed race. People of Hispanic or Latino origin made up 19.4% of the population.

People from 0–4 years old were 7.5% of the population, children from ages 5–17 were 23.2% of the population, adults 18–64 were 62.0% of the total, and people 65 and over were 7.3% of the population.

=== 2000 census ===
As of the census of 2000, there were 2,484 people, 842 households, and 675 families residing in the CDP. The population density was 136.4 inhabitants per square mile (52.7/km^{2}). There were 906 housing units at an average density of 49.8 per square mile (19.2/km^{2}). The racial makeup of the CDP was 87.2% White, 0.6% Black or African American, 0.5% Native American, 0.5% Asian, <0.1% Pacific Islander, 7.5% from other races, and 3.7% from two or more races. 16.6% of the population were Hispanic or Latino of any race.

There were 842 households, of which 43.2% had children under the age of 18 living with them, 69.2% were married couples living together, 6.8% had a female householder with no husband present, and 19.8% were non-families. 14.0% of all households had one occupant and 1.8% had someone living alone who was 65 years of age or older. The average household size was 2.95 and the average family size was 3.25.

In the CDP, the population was spread out, with 31.8% under the age of 18, 5.6% from 18 to 24, 33.3% from 25 to 44, 23.6% from 45 to 64, and 5.8% who were 65 years of age or older. The median age was 35 years. For every 100 females, there were 101.1 males. For every 100 females age 18 and over, there were 101.3 males.

The median income for a household in the CDP was $47,202, and the median income for a family was $53,958. Males had a median income of $37,418 versus $28,594 for females. The per capita income for the CDP was $19,892. About 6.1% of families and 6.3% of the population were below the poverty line, including 6.5% of those under age 18 and 7.5% of those age 65 or over.

== Education ==
The CDP is in the Vail Unified School District.

For Hallowe'en 2025, a group of Cienega High School math teachers wore shirts covered in fake blood that read, "Problem Solved". The photo went viral thus sparking controversy across the country as many believed the shirts were a reference to the assassination of Charlie Kirk. The Vail School District, headed by Superintendent John Carruth, issued a press released which stated the shirts were "meant to represent solving tough math problems". None of the individual teachers commented publicly.

== Notable people ==
- Nick Gonzales, second baseman for the Pittsburgh Pirates
- David H. Levy, astronomer

== See also ==
- Rincon Valley, Arizona
- Pantano, Arizona
