= Hardy (surname) =

Hardy is an English, French, and Scottish surname.

It appears that the oldest usage is from the Old French hardi meaning "bold, courageous" which itself comes from Old Frankish hardjan meaning "to make hard". The final -y is also typical of the French proper names (first names, surnames and place names, with the notable exception Henri, when it is a given name).

Some of the oldest Hardy families in England seem to originate from a Norman Knight de Hardy in the mid 11th century. English Hardy families can mainly be found around Dorset and Yorkshire.

In Scotland, Hardi is considered to have either Norman or Viking origin but also from a separate Celtic origin as well and is mainly a Lowland surname. The Celtic variant is a shortened form of Mac Hardie, an Anglicized form of the Mac C(h)ardaih or son of the craftsman, from the root ceardaiche. Scottish Hardys are mainly affiliated with Clan Mackintosh and Clan Farquharson as a sept and the larger Clan Chattan.

Notable people with this surname include:

== List of people with the surname ==
=== A ===
- Aaron Hardy (born 1986), English footballer
- Ab Hardy (1909–2002), Canadian speed skater
- Adolphe Hardy (1868–1954), Belgian writer
- Adolphe-Marie Hardy (1868–1954), Belgian poet and journalist
- Adolphe-Maria Gustave Hardy (1920–2011), French bishop
- Aaron Hardy (born 1986), English footballer
- Adrian Hardy (born 1970), American football player
- Adrien Hardy (born 1978), French rower
- Ahmad Hardy (born 2005), American football player
- Alan Hardy, various people
- Alexander M. Hardy, American politician from Indiana
- Alexandre Hardy (c. 1570/1572–1632), French dramatist
- Alfred Hardy (dermatologist) (1811–1893), French dermatologist
- Alfred Hardy (architect) (1900–1965), Belgian contractor and autodidact architect
- Alfred Douglas Hardy (1870–1958), Australian collector of freshwater algae specimens
- Alfredo Toro Hardy (born 1950), Venezuelan diplomat and author
- Alfred Gathorne-Hardy, British politician
- Alister Hardy, English marine biologist
- Allen Hardy (1873–1950), English footballer
- Amauri Hardy (born 1998), American-Syrian basketball player
- Amélie Hardy, Canadian documentary filmmaker
- Amos Lawson Hardy (1859–1935), Canadian photographer
- Amy Wilson-Hardy (born 1991), English rugby player
- Ange Hardy (born 1983), English singer
- Anne Hardy, British artist
- Annie Hardy, American singer-guitarist with Giant Drag
- Anthony Hardy, English mental patient and murderer
- Antonio Hardy, a.k.a. Big Daddy Kane, African-American rap artist
- Arnold Hardy, American photographer
- Arthur Charles Hardy, Canadian politician
- Arthur Hardy (actor), British actor
- Arthur Hardy (businessman), (1817–1909), Australian colonial settler and politician
- Arthur Hardy (footballer), English footballer
- Arthur Sherburne Hardy, American novelist and diplomat
- Arthur Sturgis Hardy, Canadian politician

=== B ===
- Barbara Hardy, Australian environmentalist and scientist
- Barry Hardy, American wrestler
- Bella Hardy, English folk musician, singer and songwriter
- Benjamin Gower Hardy, Australian George Cross recipient
- Ben Hardy, English Actor
- Ben Hardy (motorcycle builder), American motorcycle builder
- Benjamin Hardy, Australian volleyball player
- Bert Hardy, English photographer
- Billy Hardy (boxer), English boxer
- Billy Hardy (footballer), English footballer
- Blaine Hardy, American baseball player
- Bruce Hardy, American football player

=== C ===
- C. Moore Hardy (born 1955), Australian photographer
- "Hungry" Charles Hardy, American competitive eater
- Campbell Hardy (1831–1919), British Royal Artillery officer
- Carolyn Hardy (1930–2016), British horticulturalist
- Carroll Hardy (1933–2020), American baseball player
- Carlton Hardy (born 1971), American baseball trainer
- Caspar Bernhard Hardy (1726–1819), German priest
- Charles Hardy (Australian politician)
- Charles Hardy (1714–1780), English naval officer
- Charles Hardy, American singer, The Manhattans
- Charlie Hardy, Australian footballer
- Chauncey Hardy (1988–2011), American basketball player
- Chips Hardy (born 1950), English author
- Chris Hardy, Canadian football player
- Clarion Hardy (1877–1936), American baseball trainer
- Claude Hardy (1604–1678), French linguist and mathermatician
- Cliff Hardy (American football) (born 1947), American football player
- Corin Hardy (born 1975), English film director
- Cornelius Hardy, convict transported to Australia
- Cresent Hardy (born 1957), American politician

=== D ===
- D. Elmo Hardy (1914–2002), American entomologist
- Daequan Hardy (born 2001), American football player
- Dale Hardy (1924–2013), American football player
- Dan Hardy (born 1982), English mixed martial arts fighter
- Daniel Hardy, multiple people
- Darrell Hardy, American basketball player
- Darren Hardy, American author and speaker
- Darryl Hardy, American football player
- David A. Hardy (born 1936), English artist
- David T. Hardy, American author and jurist
- Denis Hardy (economist), Québécois economist
- Denis Hardy (politician) (1936–2016), Québécois politician
- Dennis Hardy (born 1941), English university vice-chancellor
- Don Hardy (cricketer) (1926–1998), English cricketer
- Don Ed Hardy, American tattoo artist
- Dona Hardy (1912–2011), American actress
- Dudley Hardy (1867–1922), English painter and illustrator
- Dwight Hardy (born 1986), American basketball player

=== E ===
- Ed Hardy (American football) (born 1951), American football player
- Edgar Richard "Hardy" Hardcastle (1900–1995), British economist
- Edward W. Hardy (born 1992), American composer, violinist, and violist
- Elias Hardy, English-born lawyer and politician in New Brunswick
- Elora Hardy (born 1980), Canadian designer
- Emma Hardy, various people
- Emmett Hardy (1903–1925), American jazz cornet player
- Ernest George Hardy, classicist
- Evan Hardy, English rugby player

=== F ===
- F. Digby Hardy (1868–1930), English fraudster and spy during the Irish War of Independence
- Florian Hardy (born 1985), French ice hockey player
- Forsyth Hardy (1910–1994), Scottish critic
- Francis Hardy (1923–2021), French politician
- Françoise Hardy (1944–2024), French singer
- Frank Hardy (1917–1994), Australian novelist and activist
- Frantz Hardy (born 1985), American-football player
- Frederick Daniel Hardy (1827–1911), English painter
- Friedhelm Hardy, (1943–2004), academic who specialized in Indian languages and religions

=== G ===
- G. H. Hardy (1877–1947), English mathematician
- Gabriel Hardy, Canadian politician
- Gaston Hardy (1917–1977), Quebec politician
- Gathorne Hardy, 1st Earl of Cranbrook, English politician
- Gathorne-Hardy (disambiguation), multiple people
- Gene Hardy, Canadian multi-instrumentalist and vocalist
- George Hardy (labor leader), Canadian-American
- George Hudleston Hurlstone Hardy (1882–1966), Australian entomologist
- Gerry Hardy (1937–1963), Irish rugby player
- Grant Hardy (born 1961), American historian
- Greg Hardy, American football player
- Guy U. Hardy, American politician from Colorado

=== H ===
- Hagood Hardy (1937–1997), Canadian composer & pianist
- Harry Hardy, English footballer
- Harvey Hardy, American footballer
- Heather Hardy (born 1982), American boxer and mixed martial artist
- Hélène Hardy (born 1953), French transgender politician
- Henry Hardy, editor of the works of Isaiah Berlin
- Heywood Hardy, English painter
- Hugh W. Hardy U.S. Marines General

=== I ===
- Isham Hardy (1899–1983), American football player
- Iza Duffus Hardy (1850–1922), English novelist

=== J ===
- J. J. Hardy (born 1982), American baseball player
- Jack Hardy (catcher), baseball player
- Jack Hardy, Canadian politician
- Jack Hardy (singer-songwriter)
- Jaden Hardy (born 2002), American basketball player
- James D. Hardy, Jr., American academic and historian
- James Greene Hardy (1795–1856), American politician from Kentucky
- James Hardy (American football) (born 1985)
- James Hardy (basketball)
- James Hardy (rower)
- Jane Hardy, Australian diplomat
- Jane Louisa Hardy, American activist and philanthropist
- Janet Hardy, American erotic writer
- Jean Hardy (1762–1802), French general of the French Revolution
- Jeff Hardy (born 1977), American wrestler
- Jeff Hardy (rugby league), Australian rugby player
- Jeff Hardy (swimmer), Australian Paralympic swimmer
- Jeremy Hardy (1961–2019), English comedian
- Jermaine Hardy, American footballer
- Jessica Hardy (born 1987), American swimmer
- Jim Hardy (1923–2019), American football player
- Joanna Hardy (born 1961), British fine jewellery specialist
- Jocelyn 'Joe' Hardy, ice hockey player
- John Crumpton Hardy (20th century), American college president from Mississippi
- John Francis Gathorne-Hardy (1874–1949), British First World War General
- John Gathorne-Hardy, 2nd Earl of Cranbrook (1839–1911), British peer and politician
- John Hardee, American jazz musician
- John Hardy (composer), British composer
- John Hardy (geneticist), British human geneticist and molecular biologist
- John Hardy (jewelry) (born 1949), jewelry maker
- John Hardy (MP for Bradford) (1773–1855), British politician and businessman
- John Hardy (New York politician) (1835–1913), American politician from New York
- John Hardy, 1st Baronet (1809–1888), British politician
- John Spencer Hardy (1913–2012), American lieutenant general
- Jonathan Hardy, New Zealand actor and screenwriter
- Jonny Hardy, Israeli footballer
- Joseph A. Hardy III, American businessman
- Joseph Hardy, American stage director
- Josiah Hardy (1715–1790), New Jersey colonial governor
- Jules Hardy, Québécois doctor
- Julia Hardy, British television presenter
- Julien Hardy (born 1980), French bassoonist and professor
- Justin Hardy (born 1991), American Canadian football player
- Justine Hardy (born 1966), British journalist and author

=== K ===
- K8 Hardy, performance artist
- Karen Hardy, ballroom dancer
- Kevin Hardy (defensive tackle)
- Kevin Hardy (linebacker)
- Kieran Hardy (born 1995), Welsh rugby player

=== L ===
- Laine Hardy (born 2000), American singer
- Larry Hardy, American footballer (born 1956)
- Larry Hardy (baseball)
- Lawrence Hardy, English footballer
- Lee Hardy (born 1981), English football player
- Lele Hardy (born 1988), American basketball player
- Leonard W. Hardy (1805–1884), Mormon pioneer
- Leslie Hardy, American musician
- Leslie C. Hardy (1886-1968), American politician in Arizona
- Liam P. Hardy (born 1973), American lawyer
- Lileen Hardy (1872–1947), Anglo-Scottish educator and social reformer
- Linda Hardy, French actress and model
- Lindsay Hardy (1914–1994), Australian novelist and scenarist
- Louise Hardy (born 1959), Canadian politician
- Lucien Hardy (born 1966), theoretical physicist
- Lucy Hardy (born 1978), British canoe sprinter
- Lyndon Hardy (born 1941), American science-fiction author

=== M ===
- Mabel Hardy (educator) (1890–1977), South Australian educator
- Mabel Hardy (badminton) (1879–1947), English badminton player
- Maggie Hardy (born 1965), American businesswoman
- Marc Hardy (born 1952), Belgian author
- María Cordero Hardy, Puerto Rican physiologist, educator and scientist
- Marieke Hardy, Australian television writer
- Mark A. Hardy, American surgeon
- Mark Lea Hardy, Swiss hockey player
- Mary Hardy (comedian), Australian television and radio presenter
- Matt Hardy (born 1974), American wrestler
- Matthew P. Hardy, American reproductive biologist
- Max Hardy (1983–2024), American chef and restaurateur
- Melissa Hardy (born 1969), American politician in Nevada
- Milton H. Hardy (1844–1905), American educator
- Mitch Hardy (born 1971), Australian rugby player
- Moses Hardy (1894–2006), American supercentenarian and one of the last surviving American World War I veterans

=== N ===
- Nathaniel Hardy (1618-1670), English churchman
- Nelson Hardy (1905–1993), Australian rugby player
- Nell Carter (1948–2003), born Nell Ruth Hardy, American singer and actress
- Nick Hardy (born 1996), American golfer

=== O ===
- Oliver Hardy (1892–1957), American comedy actor
- Omari Hardy (born 1989), American politician in Florida
- Owen Hardy (1922–2018), New Zealander pilot

=== P ===
- Patricia Hardy (1931–2011), American actress
- Paul Hardy, various people
- Percy Hardy, English cricketer
- Peter Hardy, Baron Hardy of Wath (1931–2003), English politician
- Peter Hardy (actor), Australian actor
- Peter Hardy (baseball executive), Canadian brewer and baseball executive
- Phil Hardy (footballer), British footballer
- Phil Hardy (journalist), English film and music industry journalist
- Philippe Hardy (1954-1984), French alpine skier
- Phillip E. Hardy (born 1956), American music critic
- Pierre Hardy, various people
- Porter Hardy Jr. (1903-1995), American politician from Virginia
- Prezel Hardy (born 1992), American sprinter

=== R ===
- Randall Hardy (born 1951), American politician in Kansas
- Raúl Hardy (born 1976), Cuban handball player
- Red Hardy (1923–2003), American baseball pitcher
- Renaud Hardy (born 1962), Belgian serial killer
- René Hardy, member of the French Resistance
- Richard Hardy, disambiguation
- Richard Meredith-Hardy, British microlight pilot
- Rio Hardy, disambiguation
- Rob Hardy, film director
- Robert Hardy (1925–2017), English actor
- Robert Hardy, bassist with Franz Ferdinand
- Robert Maynard Hardy, Anglican bishop
- Robin Hardy (American writer) (born 1955), an American novelist
- Robin Hardy (Canadian writer) (1952–1995), a Canadian novelist and journalist
- Robin Hardy (film director) (1929–2016), British film director
- Robina F. Hardy (died 1891), Scottish Victorian author
- Roger Hardy (born 1969), Canadian Internet entrepreneur
- Rolijah Hardy (born 2004), American football player
- Romain Hardy (born 1988), French cyclist
- Ron Hardy (1958–1992), American DJ
- Ronald Hardy (1919-–1991), English novelist
- Rufus Hardy (representative) (1855–1943), American politician from Texas
- Rufus K. Hardy (1878–1945), American Mormon leader and missionary
- Ruth Hardy (born 1970), American politician in Vermont

=== S ===
- Sam Hardy, various people
- Samuel Hardy (1758–1785), American lawyer and politician
- Sarah Frances Hardy (born 1969), American author and artist
- Scott Hardy, American DJ and musician
- Shelley Hardy (born 1982), Canadian curler
- Silas Hardy (1867–1905), English cricket player
- Siméon-Prosper Hardy (1729–1806), French printer and bookseller
- Solomon Hardy (1863–1931), English cricketer
- Sophie Hardy (born 1938), French actress
- Stacy Hardy, South African author
- Stan Hardy (1890-?), English footballer and manager
- Summers T. Hardy (1875–1950), American native judge

=== T ===
- Tavaras Hardy (born 1980), American basketball player
- Temple Hardy (1765–1814), British naval officer
- Terry Hardy (born 1976), American-football player
- Theodore Bayley Hardy (1863–1918), British Army chaplain
- Thomas Hardy, various people
- Thomas Duffus Hardy, English antiquary
- Thomas Hardy (English painter)
- Thomas Hardy (political reformer) (1752–1832)
- Sir Thomas Hardy, 1st Baronet (1769–1839), British naval officer and Nelson's flag-captain at Trafalgar
- Thomas Hardy (winemaker) (1830–1912), Australian winemaker
- Thomas Hardy (1840–1928), English novelist and poet
- Thomas Lionel Hardy (1887–1969), English physician
- Tim Hardy (born 1973), American soccer player
- Todd Hardy (1957–2010), Canadian politician
- Tom Hardy (designer) (born 1946), American design strategist
- Tom Hardy (born 1977), English actor
- Trevor Hardy (1945–2012), murderer

=== V ===
- Veronica Hardy (born 1995), Venezuelan mixed martial artist

=== W ===
- W. G. Hardy (1895–1979), Canadian professor, writer and ice hockey administrator
- Walter Lee Hardy (1925–1980), American baseball player
- Warren Hardy (born 1963), American politician from Nevada
- Wilfred Hardy (1938–2016), British artist and illustrator
- William Hardy, disambiguation
- William Bate Hardy (1864–1934), British biologist
- William H. Hardy (1837–1917), American founder of Hattiesburg
- William Le Hardy (1889–1961), English archivist
- Willie Hardy (1922–2007), American politician and activist
- Willis Hardy (1897–1972), Australian football player

== Fictional characters ==
- Alec Hardy, character in the ITV television programme Broadchurch, played by David Tennant
- Alice Hardy, character in the Friday the 13th franchise, played by Adrienne King.
- Andy Hardy, character in films, played by Mickey Rooney
- Frank Hardy, character in the Hardy Boys novels
- Gladys Hardy, character in The Ellen DeGeneres Show
- Jemma Hardy, character in Ian Irvine's novel The Last Albatross
- Joe Hardy, character in the Hardy Boys novels
- Lewis Hardy, character in the ITV television programme The Bill
- Ryan Hardy, character in The Following
- Steiner Hardy, character from the anime Gundam 0080
- Anti-heroes created by Marvel Comics :
  - Felicia Hardy (The Black Cat)
  - Felicity Hardy (The Scarlet Spider)
  - Walter Hardy or John Hardesky (The Cat)
- On the ABC soap opera, General Hospital :
  - Audrey March Hardy
  - Simone Ravelle Hardy
  - Steve Hardy
  - Tommy Hardy
  - Tom Hardy
  - Tommy Hardy

== See also ==
- Hardee (surname)
- Hardie
- Sarah Blaffer Hrdy, American anthropologist and primatologist
- Robert Barcia
