= Edmond Jean François Barbier =

French jurisconsult and writer (1689 – 1771)

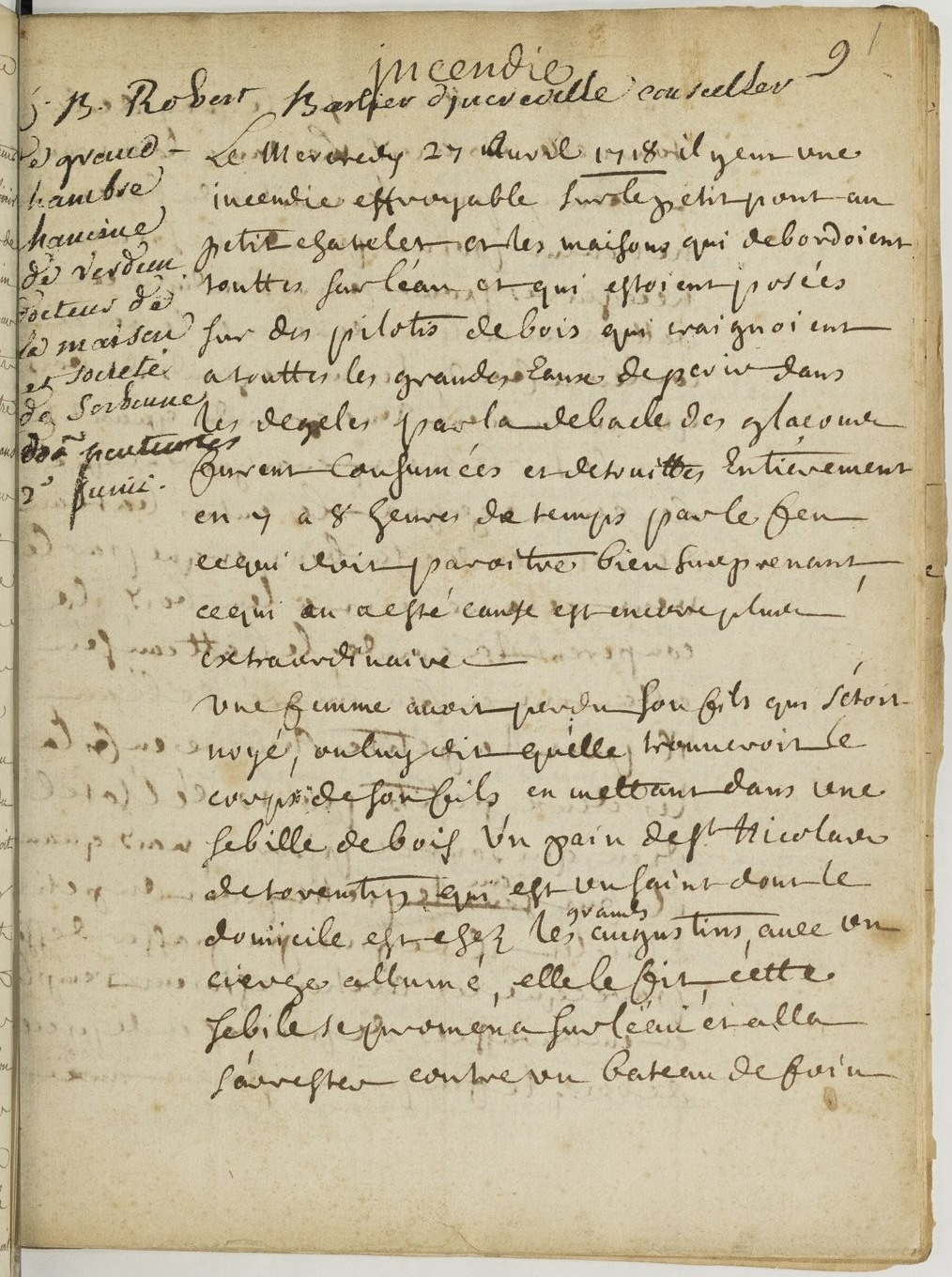
- Scan of Barbier's journal dated 27 April 1718 with "incendie" (transl. fire) written at the top.
- Born: Edmond Jean François Barbier; 16 January 1689; Paris, Kingdom of France
- Died: 29 January 1771 (aged 82); Paris, Kingdom of France
- Occupations: Jurisconsult and writer
- Known for: Keeping a detailed journal of daily life in 18th-century Paris for 45 years.
- Notable work: Chronique de la Régence et du règne de Louis XV (Note: Also referred to as Journal historique et anecdotique du règne de Louis XV)

Edmond Jean François Barbier (16 January 1689 – 29 January 1771) was a French jurisconsult of the parliament and author of a historical journal of the time of Louis XV in the Kingdom of France.

== Biography ==
Edmond Jean François Barbier was born in Paris on 16 January 1689 and lived in the center of old Paris in the Rue Galande. His father and grandfather had been lawyers at the Parlement de Paris, and he was also admitted as a consulting lawyer to the Parlement on July 30, 1708. Unlike his father, Barbier does not appear to have pled a single case. Nevertheless, his scholarly work was highly regarded by his contemporaries, including Marc Pierre de Voyer de Paulmy, Count of Argenson and the de Nicolay family.

Barbier is most well known for writing Chronique de la Régence et du règne de Louis XV, a detailed daily account of events in Paris that he kept for forty-five years, from 1718 to 1763. He began his journal on 27 April 1718, when he witnessed a devastating fire on the Petit Pont linking the left bank of the Île de la Cité and wrote about it when he returned home. Chronique is a seminal historic record of 18th-century life in Paris, consisting of 5000 handwritten pages of news that Barbier witnessed firsthand or learned about through rumor or print. It has several years of overlap with Louis de Rouvroy, duc de Saint-Simon's Mémoires, which ended in 1723, and it came before Louis Petit de Bachaumont's Mémoires secrets, which started in 1762. It is also contemporary to Siméon-Prosper Hardy's journal, Mes loisirs.

The events that Barbier describes in his chronicles sometimes differ from descriptions of the same events written in secret police gazettes. For example, on 16 January 1726, Barbier recounts how a soldier escaped by jumping from Pont Neuf into the Seine and was rescued and hidden by witnesses. However, the police gazetin described this event as happening three days earlier and claimed that the soldier was delivered.
