= Phil Hardy =

Phil, Philip, Phillip or Philippe Hardy may refer to:

- Philip Dixon Hardy (1794–1875), Irish poet and publier
- Phil Hardy (1945–2014), English artistic journalist
- Philippe Hardy (1954–1984), French alpine skier
- Phillip E. Hardy (born 1956), American screenwriter and critic
- Phil Hardy (born 1973), English footballer

== See also ==
- Hardy (surname)
