= Arthur Hardy =

Arthur Hardy may refer to:

- Arthur Hardy (businessman) (1817–1909), South Australian pastoralist, barrister, quarry-owner, businessman and politician
- Arthur Sturgis Hardy (1837–1901), Canadian premier of Ontario, 1896–1899
- Arthur Sherburne Hardy (1847–1930), U.S. diplomat and academic
- Arthur Hardy (actor) (1870–1951), British actor
- Arthur Charles Hardy (1872–1962), Canadian politician
- Arthur Hardy (footballer) (fl. 1891–1893), English footballer
- Arthur Hardy (baseball) (1891–1980), American baseball player
- Arthur C. Hardy (1895–1977), president of the Optical Society of America, 1935–1936
- Arthur "Smokestack" Hardy (1901–1995), American volunteer fire fighter, photographer, black fire historian and collector of fire memorabilia
