= Matthew Hardy =

Matthew Hardy may refer to:

- Matt Hardy, American professional wrestler
- Matthew P. Hardy, American reproductive biologist
- Matthew Hardy (stalker) English cyberstalker
