= Alfred Hardy =

Alfred Hardy may refer to:

- Alfred Hardy (dermatologist) (1811–1893), French dermatologist
- Alfred Hardy (architect) (1900–1965), Belgian contractor and autodidact architect
- Alfred Douglas Hardy (1870–1958), Australian amateur collector of freshwater algae specimens

== See also ==
- Alfred Gathorne-Hardy, British politician
