= Mathieu-François Pidansat de Mairobert =

French writer

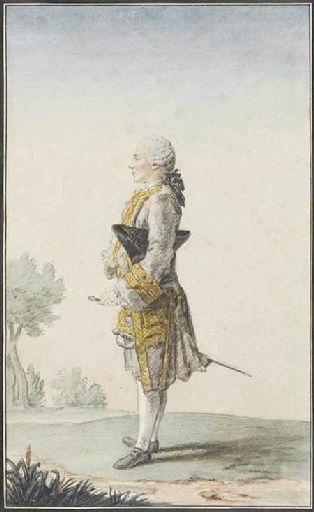
- Pidansat de Mairobert, 1760
- Born: 20 February 1727; Chaource, France
- Died: 27 March 1779 (aged 52); Paris, France
- Occupation: Writer

Mathieu-François Pidansat Mairobert (20 February 1727 – 27 March 1779) was a French writer.

== Biography ==
He was the son of François Pierre Pidansat, bailiff of the Duchy-Peerage of Aumont and commissioner lieutenant judge for the municipality of Paris (1727), and Nicole Picardat. He was also the maternal uncle of Jean Nicolas Jacques Parisot (1757-1838).

Raised by Marie Anne Doublet de Persan, whom he referred to as his mother, he quickly became involved in the discussions and disputes of the literary world. He held the position of royal censor and served as secretary to the king for the Duke of Chartres. Until his death, he contributed to the cultural and political chronicle "Mémoires secrets", traditionally attributed to Louis Petit de Bachaumont. His close ties to the "Parti Patriote" and his connections with Restif de la Bretonne led to police surveillance.

In 1779, he became implicated in the trial of the Marquis de Brunoy, to whom he was a creditor for a significant sum. Although it was believed that he was acting on behalf of a higher authority, the Parlement of Paris issued a public reprimand against him on 27 March 1779. Feeling disgraced, Mairobert went to a bathhouse that evening, where he first opened his veins with a razor before taking his life with a pistol. The parish priest of the Church of St. Eustache in Paris agreed to bury him only upon the King's express order. Restif de la Bretonne mourned his loss deeply and visited his house every year on the anniversary of his suicide to commemorate the date.

== Works ==
- Querelle de M.M. de Voltaire et de Maupertuis (1753)
- Correspondance secrète, et familière du chancelier de Maupeou avec Sorhouet (1771, in-12), a radical pamphlet reprinted under the title of Maupeouana (1773, 2 vol. in-12)
- Principes sur la Marine, (manuscript in-8°, 1775).
- Anecdotes sur la comtesse du Barry (London, 1775, in-12), one of the best sellers of the late 18th century, attributed to Charles Théveneau de Morande.
- L'Observateur anglais (London [Amsterdam], 1777-1778, 4 vol. in-12), several times reprinted under the title of l’Espion anglais (lire en ligne)
- Lettres de "Madame du Barry (London, 1779, in-12).
