= Don Hardy =

Don Hardy may refer to:

- Don Hardy (cricketer), English cricketer
- Don Hardy (speedway rider), English motorcycle speedway rider
- Don Ed Hardy, American tattoo artist
