= Victor Vreuls =

Belgian composer, violinist and conductor

Victor Jean Léonard Vreuls (Verviers, 4 February 1876 – Saint-Josse-ten-Noode, 26 or 27 July 1944) was a classical Belgian composer, violinist and conductor.

== Selected works ==
Stage

- Olivier le Simple, Opera in 3 acts (1909–1911); premiered 1922 in Brussels
- Un songe d'une nuit d'été (A Midsummer Night's Dream), Opera in 3 acts after the play by Shakespeare (1923–1924); premiered 1925 in Brussels
- Le loup-garou (The Werewolf), Légende chorégraphique (ballet) in 1 act (1935); premiered 1937 in Ghent

Orchestral

- Cortège héroïque (1894)
- Symphony in E major for violin and orchestra (1899)
- Poème in E♭ major for cello and orchestra, Op. 3 (1900); version for cello (or viola) and piano (1904)
- Jour de fête, Symphonic Poem (1904)
- Werther (1907); after the novel The Sorrows of Young Werther by Goethe
- Adagio for string orchestra
- Morceau de Concert for trumpet and orchestra (or piano) (1917)
- Élégie for flute and chamber orchestra (or piano) (1917)
- Fantaisie for French horn and orchestra (or piano) (1918)
- Romance for violin and chamber orchestra (1924)
- Caprice for violin and chamber orchestra (1924)
- Deuxième Poème (Poem No. 2) for cello and orchestra (or piano) (1930)
- Suite de danses (1939)
- Ouverture pour un drame (1940)
- Rhapsodie modèrne
- Evocation for chamber orchestra

Chamber music

- Piano Quartet (1894)
- Piano Trio in D minor, Op. 1 (1896)
- Sonata No. 1 in B major for violin and piano (1899)
- String Quartet in F major (1903)
- Sonata No. 2 in G major for violin and piano (1919)
- Sonata in D minor for cello and piano (1922)

Piano

- En Ardenne (published 1918)
- Prélude élégiaque (published 1921)
- Caprice in E major (published 1921)

Vocal

- Tryptique for voice and orchestra (published 1903); poem by Paul Verlaine
- 3 Mélodies for voice and piano (published 1912)

1. L'automne sur la Fagne (1907); poem by Jean Dominique
2. Le soir (1910); poem by René Lyr
3. J'ai reposé mon âme! (My soul found peace!) (1903); poem by Stuart Merrill

- La gerbe ardennaise for voice and piano (published 1920); words by Adolphe-Marie Hardy

1. Vesprées
2. Coin perdu
3. Dans les bois
4. L'heure du rêve

- La Guirlande des dunes, 5 Poèmes de Émile Verhaeren for voice and piano (published 1920)

1. Temps gris
2. Femme des dunes
3. Midi
4. Les Gas de la mer
5. Bruges au loin

- Pour toi for voice and piano (published 1921); poem by Tina Louant
- Chanson for voice and piano (Si tu laissais parler mon rêve il parlerait si bas); poem by Jules Delacre
- Renouveau for voice and orchestra; poem by René Lyr
- Cantata for chorus and orchestra

== Honours ==
- 1932 : Commander in the Order of Leopold.

== Bibliography ==
- Hindley, Geoffrey (1982). "Music in the Modern World: Music in Belgium and the Netherlands". The Larousse Encyclopedia of Music (2nd ed.). New York City: Excalibur. ISBN 0-89673-101-4.
