= Senator Hardy =

Senator Hardy may refer to:

- Joe Hardy (politician) (born 1949), Nevada State Senate
- Leslie C. Hardy (1886–1968), Arizona State Senate
- Paul Hardy (politician) (born 1942), Louisiana State Senate
- Randall Hardy (born 1951), Kansas State Senate
- Ruth Hardy (born 1970), Vermont State Senate
- Warren Hardy (born 1963), Nevada State Senate
