= Minnie Sarwal =

Adult and pediatric nephrologist

Minnie M. Sarwal
- Education: Cambridge University, Calcutta Medical College
- Known for: Translational biomedical informatics using large, publicly available data-sets; noninvasive transplant rejection diagnostics
- Awards: Councillor, The Transplantation Society (2014); Cunio Richardson Award for Clinical and Research Excellence, The National Kidney Foundation (2012); TTS-Roche Award for Outstanding Achievement in Transplantation Science (2010); KOL in Organ Transplantation, The Transplantation Society (2007 - 2010); Dean's Award for Resident Education, Stanford University (2005)
- Scientific career
- Fields: Bioinformatics, Health informatics, Organ transplantation, Personalized medicine, Genomics, Big Data, Molecular diagnostics
- Workplaces: UCSF, Stanford University, California Pacific Medical Center
- Doctoral advisor: Sydney Brenner

Minnie M. Sarwal is an adult and pediatric nephrologist, researcher of transplant immunology, and biotechnology entrepreneur in San Francisco. She has made significant contributions to the field of organ transplantation, including conducting the first successful complete steroid avoidance trial in the US and the first dosing safety trial for Rituximab in pediatric renal transplantation. She also spearheaded genomic and proteomics investigations into mechanisms of organ transplant injury and was the first to determine that there was substantive molecular heterogeneity in acute kidney transplant rejection. She has successfully commercialized blood testing for early diagnosis of both acute rejection and operational tolerance in kidney transplant patients, providing tools for proactive and predictive immunosuppression monitoring for transplant recipients.

== Education ==
She graduated from Calcutta Medical College, India and Guy's Hospital, London, UK, in 1985 and subsequently received a Diploma in Child Health (DCH) from London University and attained Membership of the Royal College of Physicians (MRCP) in 1990. In 1995, she completed a Ph.D. in Molecular Genetics at Cambridge University in the UK under the mentorship of Nobel Laureate Sydney Brenner. In 2009, she was awarded the Fellowship of the Royal College of Physicians (FRCP).

== Career ==
Since April 2014, Sarwal has been the director of the Precision Transplant Medicine Initiative and a professor of surgery in the Division of Multi-Organ Transplant at the University of California, San Francisco. Previously, she was a professor of pediatrics and immunology and surgery at Stanford University and the medical director of the Pediatric Kidney Transplant Program. She is a key opinion leader in organ transplantation as determined by The Transplantation Society. She is an elected councillor for both the International Pediatric Transplant Association and The Transplantation Society. She was also elected as the incoming treasurer for The Transplantation Society in 2018. She has received the Cuneo Richardson Award for outstanding contributions to kidney disease research and has also been awarded the TTS-Roche award for excellence in clinical translational science in organ transplantation.

Sarwal has an h-index of over 44, having authored over 290 scientific publications and is an inventor on over 20 patents. Her publications reflect her diverse interests in diagnostics and therapeutics of kidney disease and organ transplantation. She has also founded biotechnology companies, inclusive of Organ-i in 2009, which was acquired by Immucor in 2014 and which successfully commercialized the kSORT blood multigene assay for predicting kidney transplant rejection. She is the editor of the definitive handbook for clinical proteomics analysis, Tissue Proteomics. She is chief editor of Frontiers in Medicine, Nephrology and has held Associate/ Assistant Editor positions for other journals such as the American Journal of Transplantation, Transplantation, and Clinical Transplantation. Currently, she is a founder, along with Joshua Y. Yang, and chief medical officer of Nephrosant, Inc., a start-up focused on developing a urine-based testing platform to support kidney disease management.

Her other roles include mentorship as a Rosenman Fellow, mentor for the UCSF/Berkeley Master in Translational Medicine Program, membership on the Science Board of the FDA, and service as chief editor of a Nature journal, Frontiers in Nephrology. In January 2016, Sarwal delivered a Personalized Medicine World Conference talk describing her lab's development of molecular diagnostics techniques in organ transplantation to better detect rejection, improve the management of transplant patients, and proactively preserve organ function.

== Personal life ==
Sarwal lives with her husband, three children, and her miniature golden retriever in Portola Valley, CA. Her hobbies include tennis, piano, and art.

== Most-cited publications ==
- Sarwal, Minnie, et al. “Molecular Heterogeneity in Acute Renal Allograft Rejection Identified by DNA Microarray Profiling.” The New England Journal of Medicine, vol. 349, no. 2, 2003, pp. 125–138. Cited by 895 articles, according to Microsoft Academic.
- Naesens, Maarten, et al. “Calcineurin Inhibitor Nephrotoxicity.” Clinical Journal of The American Society of Nephrology, vol. 4, no. 2, 2009, pp. 481–508. Cited by 822 articles, according to Microsoft Academic.
- Wei, Changli, et al. “Circulating Urokinase Receptor as a Cause of Focal Segmental Glomerulosclerosis.” Nature Medicine, vol. 17, no. 8, 2011, pp. 952–960. Cited by 606 articles, according to Microsoft Academic.
