= Music of Somerset =

Somerset is a county in the south-west of England. It is home to many types of music.

== Folk music ==
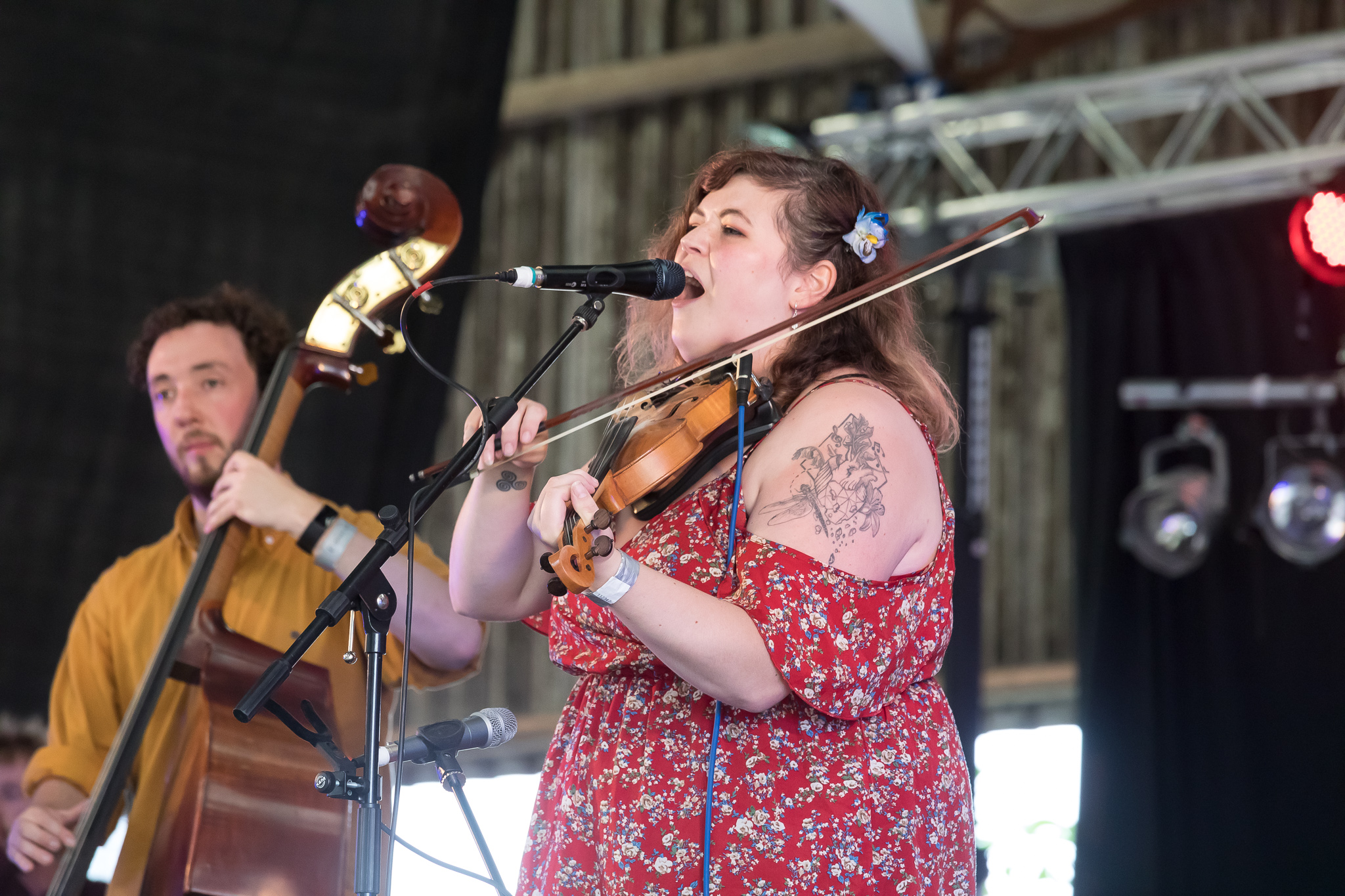
Jon Dyer & Hannah Cumming at the Purbeck Valley Folk Festival in 2021

The county has a well-documented and still vibrant folk music heritage, It was studied by one of the earliest British musicologists, Cecil Sharp. Sharp began his career of collecting folk songs in Somerset in 1903 with the editorial help of his friend Rev Charles Marson, vicar of Hambridge. Cycling around the county during holidays, Sharp ultimately collected more than 1,500 songs from Somerset. The folksinging tradition in Somerset centers on solo, a cappella singing and playing—at home, at work, and at gatherings, small or large. Sharp's five volume collection of Somerset folk songs formed the basis for his English Folk Song: Some Conclusions, a seminal 1907 publication. Some of Sharp's collections formed the basis for Songs of the West (with Sabine Baring-Gould) and Somerset Rhapsody by Gustav Holst and the "March from Somerset" in Vaughan Williams' English Folk Song Suite.

Somerset also has a contemporary folk music scene. Ange Hardy and Reg Meuross, are from the county, as well as Kitty McFarlane, Mary Bateman, Hannah Cumming and Johnny Dyer, and The Leylines. The best known folk act to come out of Somerset is undoubtedly the Wurzels, who brought the region's association with cider and farming to the international stage. The region boasts several popular folk festivals, including the Priddy Folk Festival, the West Somerset Folk Festival, Bath Folk Festival, Stogumber Festival, The Weston-super-Mare Sea Shanty and Folk Music Festival, and the Kingsbury May Festival.

== Classical ==
The City of Bath Bach Choir (CBBC) was founded in October 1946 by Cuthbert Bates, who was also a founding father of the Bath Bach Festival in 1950. The choir gave its inaugural concert in June 1947 in Bath Abbey, a performance of J. S. Bach's great Mass in B Minor. Cuthbert Bates, as well as the founder, was also the choir's principal conductor.

Somerset chamber choir was formed in 1984 by former members of Somerset Youth Choir, and typically gives two concerts annually. Initially, these were mainly around Taunton, but in July 1992 the choir gave it first Wells Cathedral concert.

Situated in Great Elm, Frome, the Jackdaws Music Education Trust was established by Maureen Lehane with the aim of improving participation in and enjoyment of Classical music and music making through weekend courses, concerts, a young artists programme and education projects. Their current projects include Jack's Music Club — a music club for teenagers promoting social music making, supported by Somerset County Music — and OperaPLUS, which will be staging Donizetti's L'elisir d'amore (sung in English as 'The Love Potion') working with locals schools and Jackdaws Young Artists.

== Venues ==
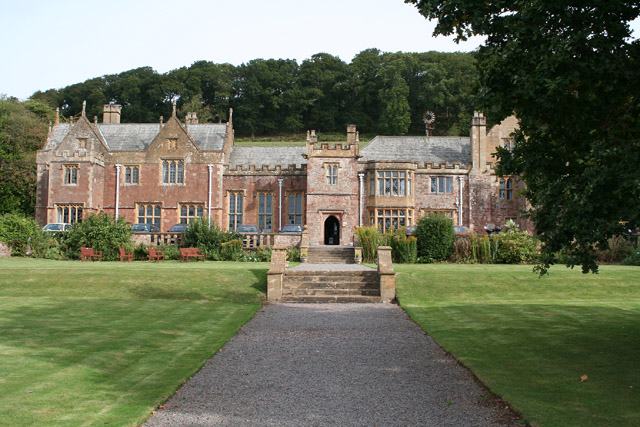
Halsway Manor

There are many music institutions that play a major part in the musical life of Somerset. Halsway Manor is the only residential centre for folk music and culture in the United Kingdom.

== Youth groups ==
Youth groups include the Somerset County Youth Orchestra, the Somerset County Youth Choir and the Somerset County Youth Concert Band and Taunton Children's Orchestra. The Taunton Area Centre and the Yeovil Music Centre are two affiliated institutions, as are the Cheddar Valley Music Club, the Yamaha Music School and COSMIC, the Centre of Somerset Music Club. Other groups include the Somerset Chamber Orchestra, founded in 1979, the Mid-Somerset Orchestra, the Winscombe Orchestra, the Yeovil Town Band and the Wincanton Town Band. Also the area of West Somerset has a unique feature in the fact that in the town of Watchet on the north coast this small town has 2 brass bands, both regularly perform in public. The bands are The Watchet Town Band and The West Somerset Brass Band.

== Well-known artists ==
Well-known musicians from Somerset include Acker Bilk, a jazz musician from Pensford (who formed the Paramount Jazz Band), Weston-super-Mare-born Deep Purple and Rainbow guitarist Ritchie Blackmore, and local folk artists Adge Cutler and The Wurzels (simply The Wurzels after Cutler's death), who were the most prominent Somerset band in the Scrumpy and Western music scene. The Wurzels began their long career in 1966, with the release of "Drink Up Thy Zider", which sold more than 100,000 copies. They topped the singles chart with "Combine Harvester (Brand New Key)" in 1976. More recently, a younger generation of folk singers and musicians have appeared on the scene.

== Rock and pop ==
More recently, bands that have originated, or have some connections in Somerset include Reef, Kula Shaker and Toploader. All of these have played at the Glastonbury Festival—the largest and richest annual event in Somerset's music scene.

Three of the most beloved musical artists of the 1980s new wave scene, Tears for Fears, Naked Eyes, and Climie Fisher, came from Bath in Somerset, and were a part of the same musical scene in their native Bath.

Portishead are a musical group named after the town of Portishead, Somerset. Portishead consists of Geoff Barrow, Beth Gibbons, and Adrian Utley, while sometimes citing a fourth member, Dave McDonald, an engineer on Dummy and Portishead.

Gabrielle Aplin lives in Bath in Somerset and gained major popularity from her cover of Frankie Goes To Hollywood's 'Power Of Love' that reached number one in the singles charts in 2012. She recently release her debut album "English Rain" and often mentions Somerset on her Twitter account.

George Shelley of X Factor Boy band Union J grew up in Somerset, in particular Burnham-on-Sea and Clevedon. George attended The King Alfred School, Highbridge, Kings of Wessex School and Weston College.

== Festivals ==
The first Glastonbury Festivals were a series of cultural events held in summer, from 1914 to 1926 in Glastonbury. The festivals were founded by English socialist composer Rutland Boughton and his librettist Lawrence Buckley. Apart from the founding of a national theatre, they envisaged a summer school and music festival based on utopian principles.

The Glastonbury Festival of Contemporary Performing Arts, commonly abbreviated to Glastonbury or Glasto, is the largest green field open-air music and performing arts festival in the world. Organiser Michael Eavis stated that he decided to host the first festival, then called Pilton Festival, after seeing an open air Led Zeppelin concert at the Bath Festival of Blues and Progressive Music 1970 at the nearby Bath and West Showground in 1970. The Big Green Gathering (BGG) was a festival with an environmental focus which happened during most summers between 1994 and 2007. It was held at various locations in Somerset and Wiltshire. The event grew from the Green Fields area of the Glastonbury Festival.

The Bath International Music Festival, also known as the Bath Music Fest, is held each summer in Bath. Inaugurated in 1948, the festival includes many genres such as orchestral, contemporary jazz, folk and electronica.

The Weston-super-Mare Sea Shanty and Folk Music Festival started in 2021. It is not for profit; raising £5000 for the local RNLI and Lion's Clubs in 2021. It is returning in 2022 and will be an annual event organised by The Steepholmers Shanty Band (Reg Charity 1197505) who are from Weston-super-Mare. The Festival has more than 50 Sea Shanty and Folk Music bands from all over the British Isles across more than 14 venues in the town and along the seafront.

The Priddy Folk Festival is a volunteer run charitable festival raising money to promote music performance and improving the environs of Priddy. It is a 3 day festival held on the second weekend in July and has been running for over 30 years featuring high quality folk artists from across the world and many up and coming stars.

There are also small festivals with a music focus within the county such as the Farmfestival, Frome Festival, Sunrise Celebration, Stogumber Festival, Trowbridge Village Pump Festival and the Two Moors Festival.

The Trowbridge Village Pump Festival, originally based in Trowbridge, Wiltshire, sat partly within the Somerset border at Farleigh Hungerford for most of its life and will continue to do so for the 2018 edition.
