= Robin Hardy =

Robin Hardy may refer to:

- Robin Hardy (American writer) (born 1955), American novelist
- Robin Hardy (Canadian writer) (1952–1995), Canadian novelist and journalist
- Robin Hardy (film director) (1929–2016), British film director
