= Amos Lawson Hardy =

Canadian photographer (1859–1935)

- Born: Amos Lawson Hardy; 4 October 1859; Allendale, Shelburne County, Nova Scotia, Canada
- Died: 2 October 1935 (aged 75); Kentville, Kings County, Nova Scotia, Canada
- Other name: A.L. Hardy
- Occupation: Photographer
- Known for: Photography

Amos Lawson Hardy (4 October 1859 – 2 October 1935), also known as A.L. Hardy, was a Canadian photographer who was active in Nova Scotia.

== Early life ==
Amos Lawson Hardy was born in Allendale near Lockeport in Shelburne County, Nova Scotia, Canada on 4 October 1859.

Amos was born as the fourth son to Stephen Hardy and Mary Eliza Vaughan. His family engaged in fishing and farming and traced its roots to Loyalists.

== Career ==
Early on, Amos Lawson Hardy worked as both a barrel-maker and merchant.

A.L. Hardy launched his photography career in the early 1890s in Kentville. On 8 June 1892, the Western Chronicle announced the opening of a "photo and tintyping business in all its branches" on Kentville's Church Street. Partnering with his brother, Irad Hardy, he opened a photographic studio, assuming the role of photographer while Irad briefly managed the business. Although Hardy ventured into landscape photography, his studio work—specializing in portrait photography—remained a major part of his profession. Hardy photographed members of several prominent Kings County families, including the Ilsleys and the Chases, and in 1893, he produced a portrait of George Munro.

He later engaged in railway photography, capturing a series of images along the Dominion Atlantic from Yarmouth to Halifax.

By 1902, he was among over 65 photographers actively working in the rural communities throughout Nova Scotia. That year, Hardy published a collection of nearly 100 views showing Western Nova Scotia and the Annapolis Valley under the title "The Evangeline Land." The work was influenced by Henry Wadsworth Longfellow's 1847 poem, Evangeline, A Tale of Acadie, which boosted Nova Scotia's early tourist industry. To promote the province's blossoming tourism, images by the photographer were used by the government, railways, and steamship companies. Hardy's work appeared in promotional brochures produced by the Dominion Atlantic Railway, which was headquartered in Kentville. Hardy's images highlighted Grand Pré, Fundy Tides, and orchards, designed to portray a perfect natural paradise and encourage summer tourists to visit the province. His photograph, "The Village of Grand Pré," was one of the most reproduced images of Nova Scotia throughout the 1900s.

Hardy took a photograph of Kings County bear hunter David Costley with a trapped bear in 1908. In 1909 and 1910, he photographed members of the Kentville Presbytery as a group. A.L. Hardy's work was featured in a 1914 immigration pamphlet for the Minister of the Interior, which included one or two of his early landscapes. After 1915, he shifted away from landscape photography, having already photographed most of Kings County. His business became more reliant on studio portraits, local photography, and selling older landscape prints. He spent considerable time color-tinting images, and a few of his works were later turned into postcards by companies in Toronto, Montreal, and Moncton.

Throughout his 40-plus-year career, the Nova Scotia photographer took 1,000s of landscape and seascape photographs, but only a limited number of these images are preserved in national and regional archives. His photographs, once "sold in all parts of the world" and instrumental in showcasing Nova Scotia to Americans, have since become largely forgotten.

== Death ==
Amos Lawson Hardy died on 2 October 1935 in Kentville, Kings County, Nova Scotia, Canada. Nova Scotia newspapers reported the death, recognizing him as "one of the outstanding photographers of the province.

== Legacy ==
Hardy's work was featured in the 1983 "The Past in Focus" exhibition by Dr. Henry Bishop held at MSVU Art Gallery. Approximately 15 of his pieces appeared along with other historical photographs. The Public Archives of Canada highlighted him in the 1985 Aperçu exhibition in Ottawa, holding 50 of his prints. The Public Archives of Nova Scotia possesses a small number of originals, and Acadia University has some of his work, including university building views.

The Kings County Museum and the Kings Historical Society hold more than 250 Hardy photographs in their vaults, with many others in private collections.

== Works ==
- The Evangeline Land (1902)
