= Richard Hardy =

Richard Hardy may refer to:

- Richard Hardy (MP) (died 1607), English politician, MP for Newport (Isle of Wight)
- Richard Hardy (footballer) (born 1913), English footballer
- Richard Hardy, mayor of Chattanooga, Tennessee, 1923–27
- Richard Hardy (architect) (1850–1904), British architect based in Nottingham
