= Mark A. Hardy =

Mark Adam Hardy was Auchincloss Professor of Surgery, director emeritus of the Transplant Centre, and Vice Chairman and Residency Program Director of the Department of Surgery at the Columbia University College of Physicians and Surgeons and NewYork-Presbyterian Hospital in New York City. He retired from Columbia in 2023, after almost 50 years of service.

== Biography ==
Hardy attended medical school at the Albert Einstein College of Medicine in New York City and trained in surgery at Strong Memorial Hospital in Rochester. After returning to New York, he founded the Transplant Program at New York-Presbyterian Hospital.

He is most recognized for co-founding the New York Organ Donor Network in 1978 (NYODN 2006). In addition to his work in transplantation, in the earlier part of his career he made several contributions to the development of prosthetic vascular grafts and the development and studies of biologic function of thymic hormones, both experimentally and clinically.

Hardy laid another cornerstone of organ transplant medicine by helping found the program for dialysis and kidney transplantation at NewYork-Presbyterian Hospital. He based the new program on the principle of combined clinical care between surgeons and nephrologists during a time when renal transplant programs were managed by one or the other discipline, never by both at once (CUMC Programs 2007). This cooperation between disciplines led to major contributions in immunogenetics, immunosuppression, and treatment of autoimmune diseases and lymphoma (CUMC Programs 2007).

His most recent focus has been on cellular transplantation with emphasis on islet transplantation. Hardy was Principal Investigator of a multicenter clinical trial exploring a combination of two immunosuppressant drugs, sirolimus and tacrolimus (CUMC 2007 Kidney). He was also a member of several multiinstitutional studies of immunosuppressive agents which were individually sponsored by Novartis, Astellas, and Bristol Myers.

== Honors ==
Hardy has been a professor in about 30 institutions and delivered over 10 eponymous lectures worldwide. He has received honoraria for lectures in the past from Upjohn, Sangstat, Hoffmann-La Roche, Novartis, Astellas, and Gore.

- Honorary Doctor of Philosophy, Hallym University, South Korea, 2004
- Honoris Causa Doctoris, University of Warsaw, 2000
- Honorary Fellowship in the Polish Surgical Society, 1999
- NIH Academic Scholar in Surgery, 1968–1971

He was a founding member of the American Society of Transplant Surgeons and served as its 21st President in 1994–1995.

== Selected publications ==
Hardy was an editor of Transplantation and has published more than 300 articles on subjects varying from surgical techniques to basic immunology. He was also editor of one of the first books on xenotransplantation, Xenograft 25.

- Schilfgaarde, Reinout van; Hardy, Mark A., eds. (1988). Transplantation of the endocrine pancreas in diabetes mellitus. Amsterdam, New York: Elsevier. ISBN 978-0-444-81007-6. OCLC 18815190.
- Hardy, Mark A., ed. (1989). Xenograft 25. International congress series. Vol. 880. Amsterdam: Excerpta Medica. ISBN 978-0-444-81113-4. OCLC 223242743.
- Hardy, Mark A., ed. (1991). Psychosocial aspects of end-stage renal disease. Loss, Grief & Care. Vol. 5. New York: Haworth Press. ISBN 9781560241492. OCLC 23355237.
- The Use of Allopeptides in Tolerance Induction In Rodents. MA Hardy, OO Oluwole, HA Depaz, R Gopinathan, AO Ali, M Garrovillo and SF Oluwole. Graft. 2003.
- Evaluation of a°. A 360 Night-float System for General Surgery: A Response to Mandated Work-hours Reduction. MJ Goldstein, E Kim, WD Widmann, MA Hardy. Current Surgery. 61(5):445-451. 2004.
- Hardy, Mark A.; Hochman, Beth R., eds. (2023). Global Surgery: How to Work and Teach in Low- and Middle-Income Countries. Cham: Springer International Publishing. doi:10.1007/978-3-031-28127-3. ISBN 978-3-031-28126-6.
