= Marie Anne Doublet =

French scholar, writer, and salonnière

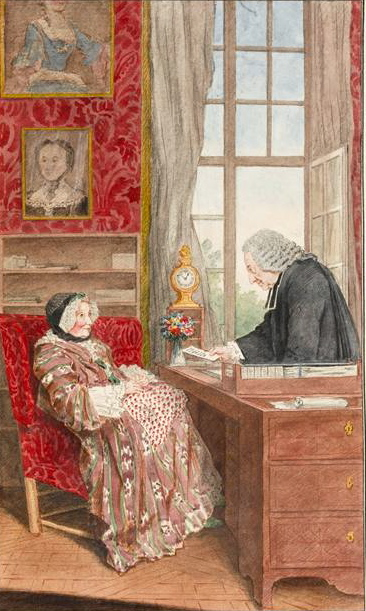
Marie Anne Doublet and her brother, Father Legendre

Marie Anne Doublet (23 August 1677 – May 1771), known as Doublet de Persan, Legendre, was a French scholar, writer and salonnière. She was born and died in Paris.

After the death of her husband, Doublet was the friend and possible lover of Louis Petit de Bachaumont; she was a supporter of parlement. The salon, known as The Parish, met in Doublet's home within the walls of the convent of the Convent of the Filles-Saint-Thomas. It sponsored a clandestine newsletter, the Mémoires secrets pour servir à l'histoire de la République des Lettres en France.

Members of the salon Doublet were against what they saw as rococo degeneracy and advocated for a strict and moralistic classicism. Doublet herself was a critique of rococo art; she and Bachaumont helped foster the classicist revival in the academy in the 1740s and 1750s. A central figure of the salon Doublet was Jean-Baptiste de La Curne de Sainte-Palaye.
