= Friedhelm Hardy =

- Born: 1943
- Died: 4 August 2004
- Occupation: Prof. at King's College London

Friedhelm Ernst Hardy (1943 – 4 August 2004), also known as Fred Hardy, was Professor of Indian Religions, teaching at King's College London. He was a linguist familiar with both classical and modern Indian languages, described in his obituary as "unrivalled in this country and possibly anywhere in the world today". He is the author of two prominent works, The Religious Culture of India: Power, Love and Wisdom and Viraha-Bhakti: The Early History of Kṛṣṇa Devotion in South India.

== Early years ==
Hardy was born in the Rhineland and according to his obituary "showed an early interest in languages and scripts." He began studying Sanskrit in Cologne before moving on to his doctoral work at Oxford University in 1967. While at Oxford, he met Aruna Gokhale, a mathematician, whom he later married.

== Notable work ==
Hardy went to Tamil Nadu to conduct research for his doctoral thesis, spending over a year examining the history of Krishnaism, specifically all pre-11th century sources starting with the stories of Krishna and the gopis, of Northern Literature, and including Mayon mysticism of the Vaishnava Tamil saints, Sangam Tamil literature and Alvars' Krishna-centered devotion in the rasa of the emotional union and the dating and history of the Bhagavata Purana. The resultant thesis was detailed to the point that it had to be abbreviated for its 1983 publication. His book Viraha-bhakti was considered to have contained some major discoveries. His first discovery concerned the emotion displayed towards Krishna as "bhakti", or object of devotion, in the Bhagavad Gita. Hardy demonstrated that this was more of an intellectual type, whereas emotional bhakti is different and expressed in the various connections between records and traditions there is evidence of early "southern Krishnaism", even there was a tendency to allocate this tradition to the Northern traditions. There is a narrative context in which the early writings in Dravidian culture such as Manimekalai and the Cilappatikaram present Krishna, his brother, and favourite female companions in the similar terms. He argued that the Sanskrit Bhagavata Purana is essentially a Sanskrit "translation" of the bhakti of the Tamil alvars. Accordingly, South Indian texts illustrate close parallels to the Sanskrit traditions of Krishna and his gopi companions, so ubiquitous in later North Indian text and imagery. Some consider his work fundamental to the study of how Hinduism developed. He had also theorised in his subsequent publications how Tamil bhakti gradually spread to the North India and laid the ground for the later bhakti of Chaitanya Mahaprabhu and Vallabhacharya.

== Notable theories and statements ==
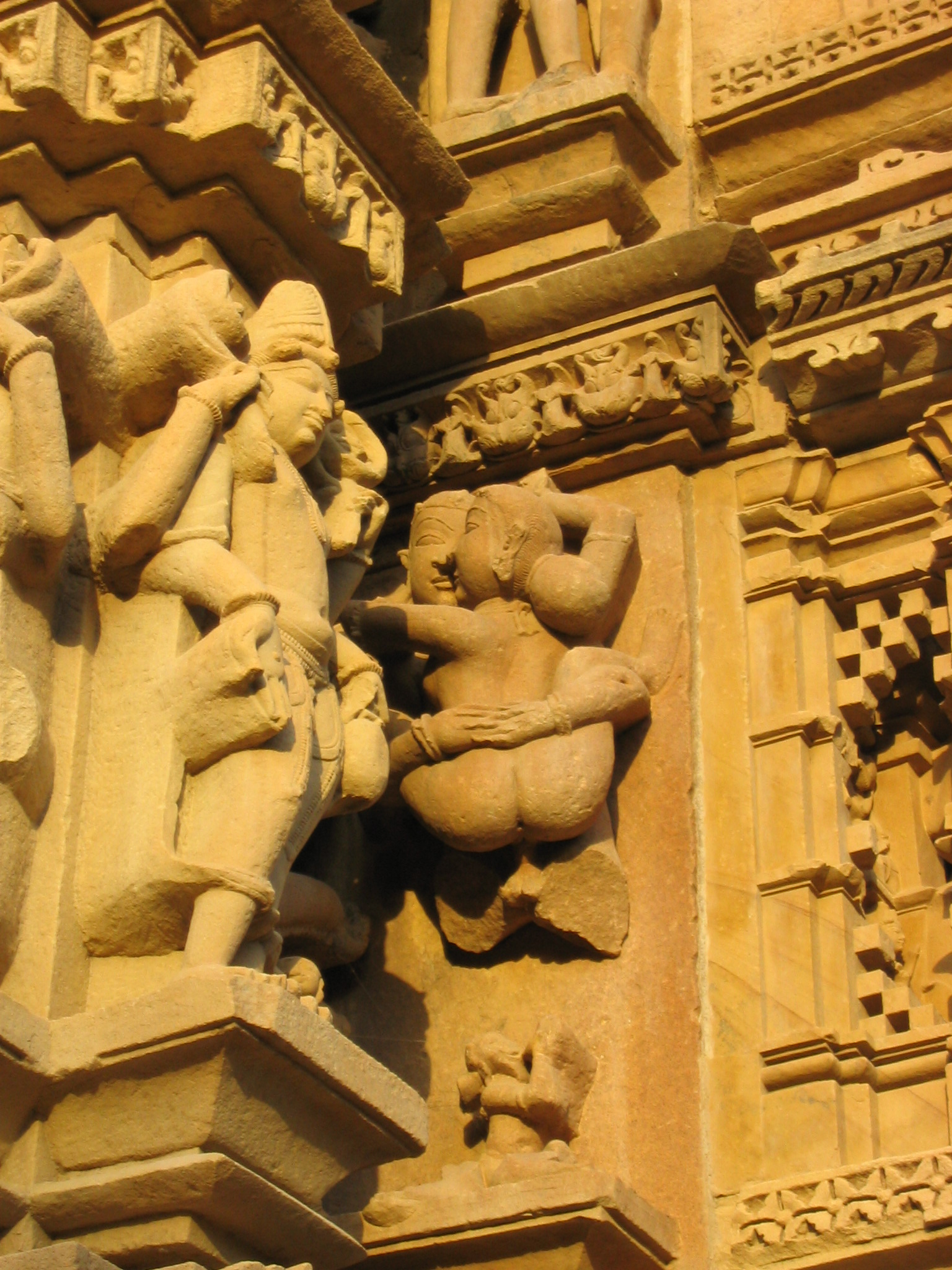

- Erotic images on Hindu Temples

After long studies in India, Fred Hardy came up with a theory as to the meaning of erotic sculptures, such as for example visible on the temples of Khajuraho. The erotic sculptures are visible on may temple of the South India, the main area of expertise of Hardy. This theory was first expressed to him by people in a temple's environs. Fred Hardy theorised that the erotic sculptures on the outer walls of Hindu temples are intended to keep away demons from the pure sanctuary of the shrines.

- Modern Myth of Hinduism

He has suggested: That the global title of "Hinduism" has been given to [such a variety of religions] must be regarded as an act of pure despair.

- Pluralism in religion

He had concluded: religious pluralism is demonstrable nonsense.

== Other works and projects ==
His also was an editor of a general companion to Indic religions, The World's Religions: the Religions of Asia published in 1990. He was also notably invited to give the Wilde Lectures on Comparative Religion at Oxford University were later published in 1994 as The Religious Culture of India: Power, Love and Wisdom.

== See also ==
- Svayam Bhagavan
- Krishna
- Clay Sanskrit Library
- Bhagavata Purana
- Puranas
- Hardy (surname)
