= Grimbergen Airfield =

Airfield in Grimbergen, Belgium

Grimbergen Airfield Recreatief Vliegveld Grimbergen
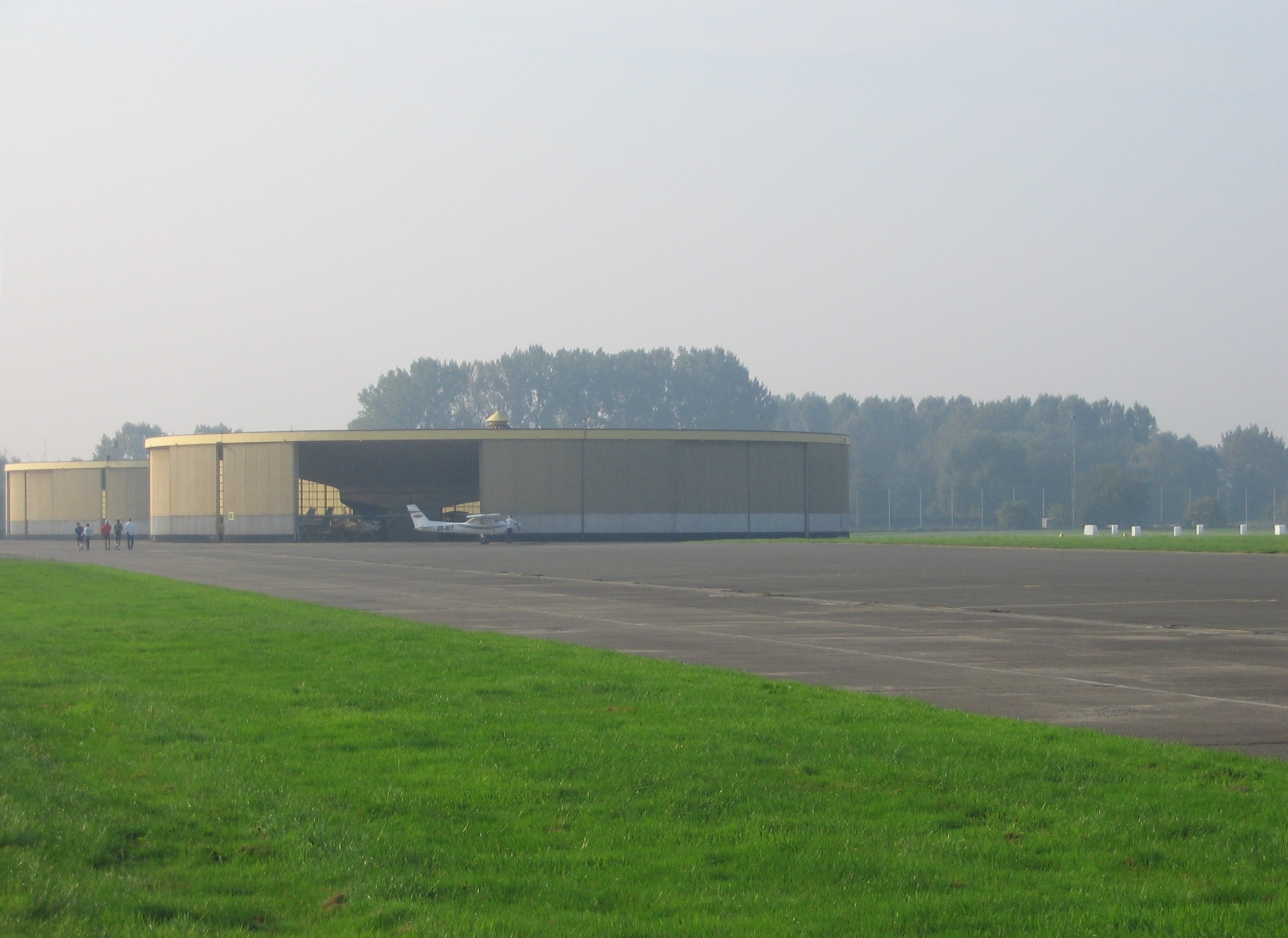
- IATA: none; ICAO: EBGB

Summary
- Airport type: Private
- Location: Grimbergen, Belgium
- Elevation AMSL: 62 ft (19 m)
- Coordinates: 50°56′55″N 004°23′31″E
- Website: www.rvg.be

Map
- Location of Grimbergen Airfield

Runways
Direction	Length		Surface
Direction	m	ft	Surface
01/19	615	2,018	Grass
- Sources: Belgian AIP

Grimbergen Airfield (Dutch: Vliegveld Grimbergen, ICAO: EBGB) is a general aviation aerodrome located in Grimbergen, a municipality of the province of Flemish Brabant in Belgium.

== Overview ==
Like many recreational aerodromes in Belgium, it is formally a private field, requiring prior permission to land from visitors. The airfield is home to motorized aircraft, either privately owned or belonging to two active aeroclubs. It also hosts an aircraft repair and maintenance company.

There are two remarkable hangars on the airfield, constructed in 1947 by builder-architect Alfred Hardy. Looking more like silos, they are in fact round hangars made of prestressed concrete.

The airfield was first created in 1939 by the Belgian military, and came to full development during World War II by German occupation forces. After the war, it hosted the pilot's school of Belgian flag carrier Sabena.

In 1989, as part of a political reorganisation, the aerodrome was passed from the Belgian national authority RLW/RVA to the regional Flemish government, who closed it soon after. The aerodrome reopened in 1997 at the hands of a private not for profit association, who have been running it since. A large part of the aerodrome had to be given up however, to be transformed into a forest, Lintbos.

== See also ==
- Transportation in Belgium
