= Sam Hardy =

Sam Hardy may refer to:

- Sam Hardy (actor)
- Sam Hardy (footballer)
- Sam Hardy (rower)

== See also ==
- Samuel Hardy, American lawyer, planter and politician
