= Jane Louisa Hardy =

American activist and philanthropist

- Born: August 21, 1828; Utica, New York, U.S.
- Died: October 11, 1915 (aged 87); Ithaca, New York, U.S.
- Resting place: Ithaca City Cemetery
- Occupations: activist philanthropist

Jane Louisa Hardy (August 21, 1828 – October 11, 1915) was an American activist and philanthropist. She was an active member of the Woman's Christian Temperance Union and the Ladies Benevolent Union in Ithaca, New York. During the American Civil War, Hardy organized the Ithaca Volunteer Association to provide relief to Union Army soldiers. In 1883, she served as vice president of the Tompkins County branch of the New York State Charities Aid Association.

== Early life and family ==
Hardy was born in Utica, New York on August 21, 1828, to Charles Elias Hardy and Louisa Walker Hardy. She was the middle of three sisters. Her family moved to Ithaca, New York around 1830, where her father opened a hardware store. Her father also served as a village trustee, cashier of the Merchants and Farmers Bank, and was one of the incorporators of Ithaca Water Works Company. The Hardy family were of relative social and economic prominence in the community, and were connected by marriage to the influential Williams family.

== Activism and philanthropy ==
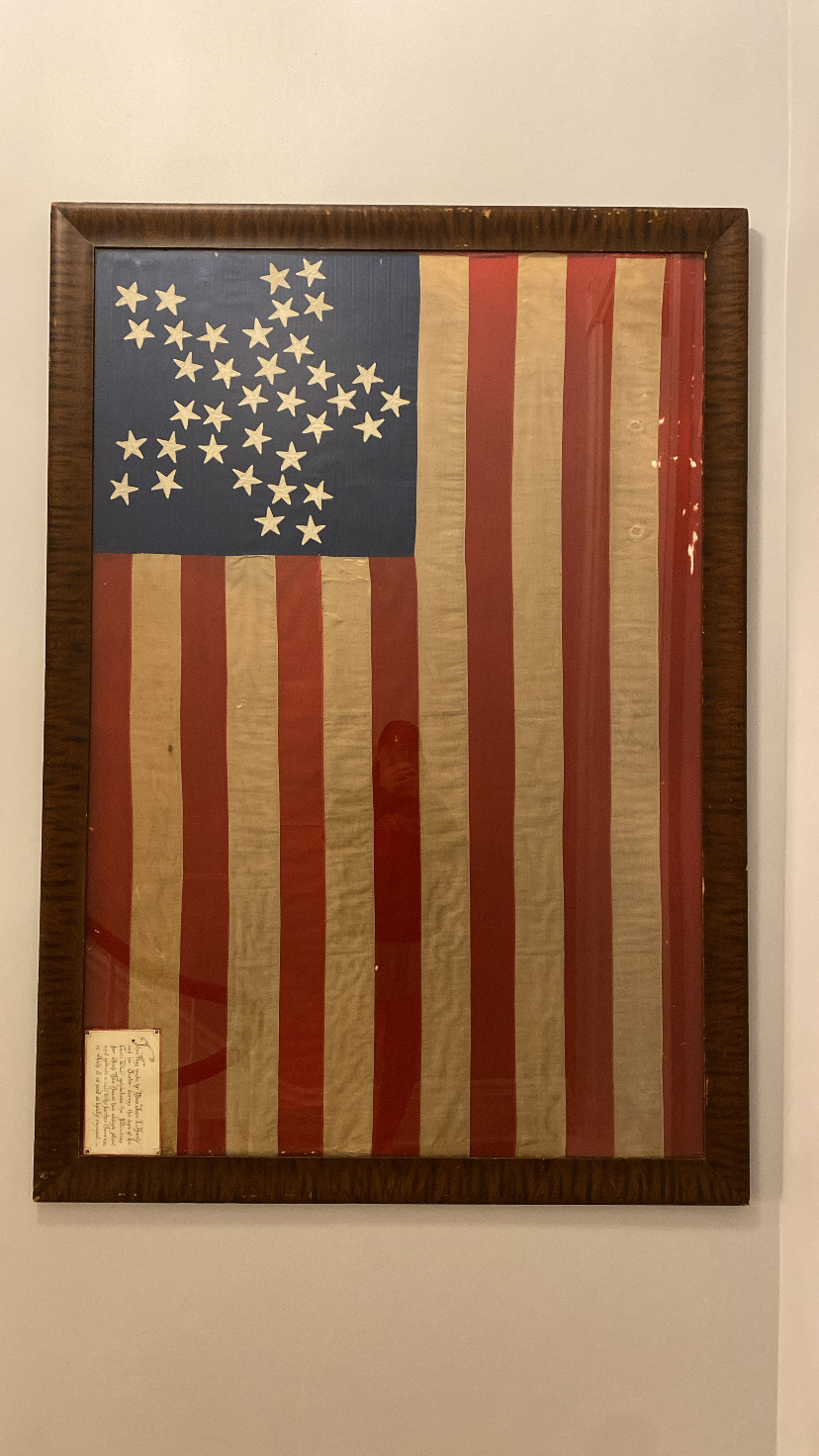
American flag made by Hardy and her sister during the Civil War.

Hardy was active in the Woman's Christian Temperance Union and the Ladies Benevolent Union, Ithaca's first secular organization with a mission to care for the city's poor. She served on the Ithaca City Hospital board for many years.

During the American Civil War, Hardy organized the Ithaca Volunteer Association. The association coordinated the seventeen women's committees in Tompkins County to knit and sew clothing for Union soldiers. Between 1861 and 1864, the Ithaca Volunteer Association contributed $2,859.08 for Union relief. Hardy's efforts also resulted in funds being sent from Tompkins County to the Women's Central Relief Association, the Christian Commission, and various efforts to support freedmen in the South. Hardy noted with disdain that "Copperheadism", a movement within the Democratic Party that opposed the war and pushed for a peace settlement with the Confederacy, was rampant among the wealthiest residents of Tompkins County.

She was active in the Presbyterian Church. Hardy often visited the Tompkins County Poor House and reported on the conditions there. She donated to support the Ithaca City Cemetery, where her family maintained a burial plot, and housed visiting Christian ministers and missionaries at her home.

In 1883, Hardy became vice president of the Tompkins County branch of the New York State Charities Aid Association. She served as a patroness of literary readings and served on a committee in 1889 to help women in Johnstown, Pennsylvania following a flood.

== Personal life ==
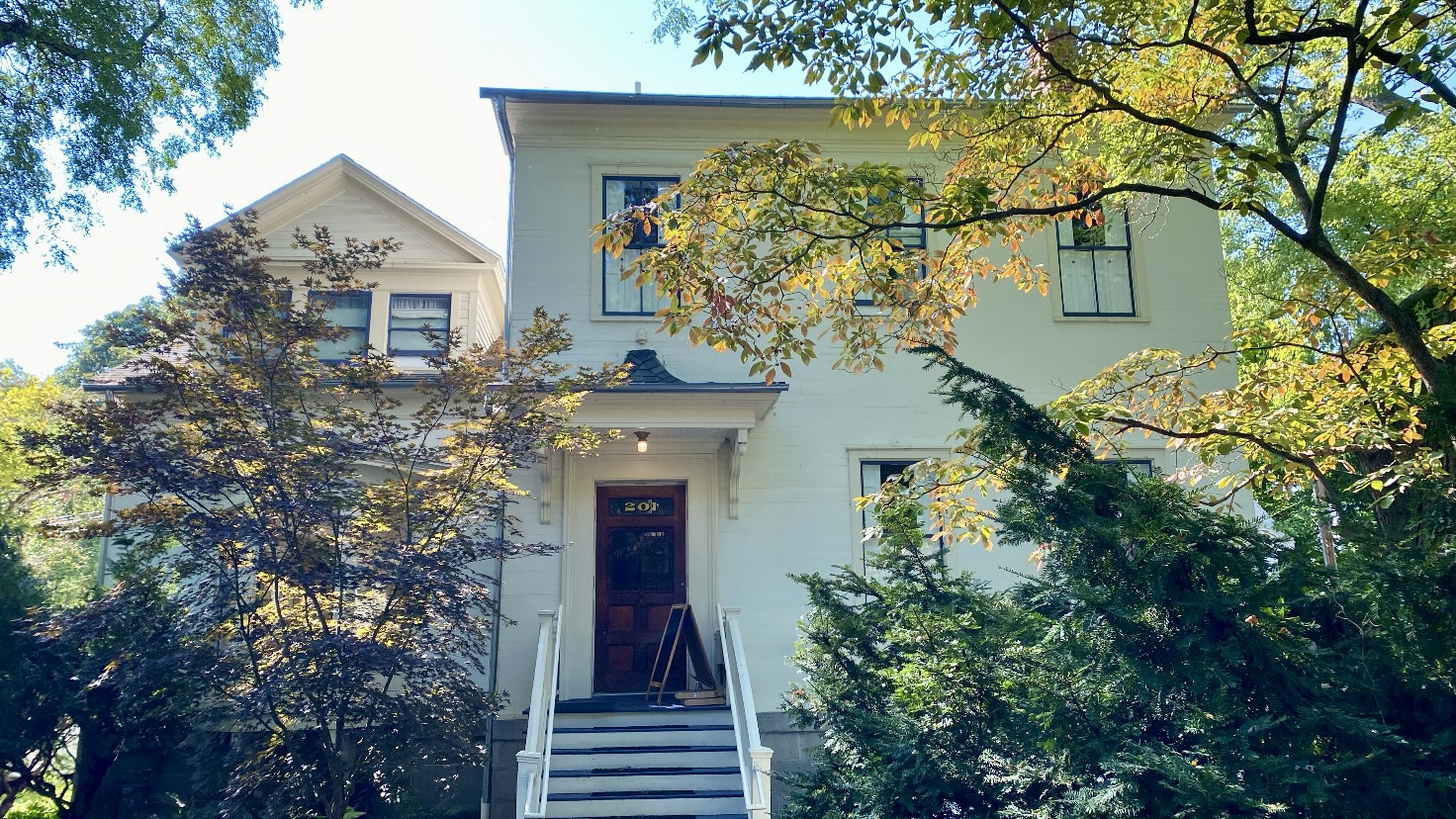
201 Clinton Street, Hardy's residence in Ithaca, New York.

Hardy never married, instead dedicating her time to charitable causes. She lived at 201 Clinton Street, at the corner of Clinton and South Geneva Street in Ithaca. She was a parishioner at First Presbyterian Church.

Hardy died on October 11, 1915, following several months of illness. Her funeral was held at her home in Ithaca. She was buried in her family's plot in Ithaca City Cemetery. She left her home to the American Red Cross.
