= Daniel Hardy =

Daniel Hardy or Dan Hardy may refer to:

- Daniel Hardy (tight end) (born 1987), American football player
- Daniel Hardy (defensive end) (born 1998), American football player
- Dan Hardy (born 1982), English mixed martial artist
- Daniel W. Hardy (1930–2007), Anglican theologian
