= Alan Hardy =

Alan Hardy may refer to:

- Alan Hardy (producer), Australian writer and producer
- Alan Hardy (rugby league), British rugby league footballer
- Alan Hardy (basketball) (born 1957), American basketball player
- Alan M. Hardy, American diplomat, United States Ambassador to Equatorial Guinea
