= Gerry Hardy =

Irish rugby union player

- Full name: Gerald Gabriel Hardy
- Born: 29 March 1937 Omeath, County Louth, Ireland
- Died: 27 October 1963 (aged 26) Drogheda, County Louth, Ireland

Rugby union career
- Position: Fly-half
International career
Years	Team	Apps	(Points)
1962	Ireland	1	(0)

Gerald Gabriel Hardy (29 March 1937 — 27 October 1963) was an Irish international rugby union player.

== Biography ==
Born in Omeath, County Louth, Hardy was the son of a businessman and younger brother of priest Michael Hardy, well known as a Louth GAA player in the 1940s.

Hardy played his rugby for Bective Rangers and was capped once for Ireland, as a fly-half against Scotland at Lansdowne Road during the 1962 Five Nations, in partnership with 17-year old scrum-half John Quirke.

In 1963, Hardy was one of six people killed in a car accident near Gormanston.

== See also ==
- List of Ireland national rugby union players
