= Silas Hardy =

English cricketer (1867–1905)

Personal information
- Full name: Silas Hardy
- Born: 30 April 1867; Ilkeston, Derbyshire, England
- Died: 27 June 1905 (aged 38); Kimberley, Nottinghamshire, England
- Bowling: Right-arm fast-medium

Domestic team information
- Years: Team
- 1893–1895: Nottinghamshire

Career statistics
| Competition | First-class |
|---|---|
| Matches | 5 |
| Runs scored | 45 |
| Batting average | 9.00 |
| 100s/50s | –/– |
| Top score | 12* |
| Balls bowled | 545 |
| Wickets | 4 |
| Bowling average | 68.50 |
| 5 wickets in innings | – |
| 10 wickets in match | – |
| Best bowling | 2/100 |
| Catches/stumpings | 2/– |
- Source: Cricinfo, 5 October 2010

Silas Hardy (30 April 1867 – 27 June 1905) was an English cricketer. Hardy was a right-arm fast-medium bowler, although which hand he batted with is unknown. He was born in Ilkeston, Derbyshire.

Hardy made his first-class debut for Nottinghamshire against Kent in 1893 County Championship. From 1893 to 1895, he represented the county in 5 first-class matches, the last of which came against Derbyshire in the 1895 County Championship. In his 5 first-class matches, he scored 45 runs at a batting average of 9.00, with a high score of 12*. With the ball he took 4 wickets at a bowling average of 68.50, with best figures of 2/100.

He died at Kimberley, Nottinghamshire on 27 June 1905.
