= Scott Hardy =

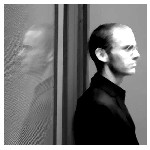

Background information
- Also known as: dj dxdt, scott.dxdt, Brick Blaisdale, DJ Shard, THE IMMIGRANT, ADHDJ
- Genres: Techno; Electronic music
- Occupations: Electronic musician DJ, Audio Engineer
- Years active: 1998 – present
- Label: Arktik Records – ARK 005
- Website: soundcloud.com/djdxdt

Scott Hardy is an underground Techno DJ and musician who has appeared in the UK and Australia, and on Second Life since 2001 to present. As an Audio Engineer he was published in New Zealand.

== Biography ==
He was resident DJ and promoter for the techno night dxdt in London for several years, and ran a weekly internet radio show on Pulseradio alongside it.

He is credited with the soundtrack music for the 2001 British film To A Future... With Love. Hardy released his first EP on vinyl in 2001. It was in the hard house genre. In 2006, he released a minimalist techno album online, his first original album.

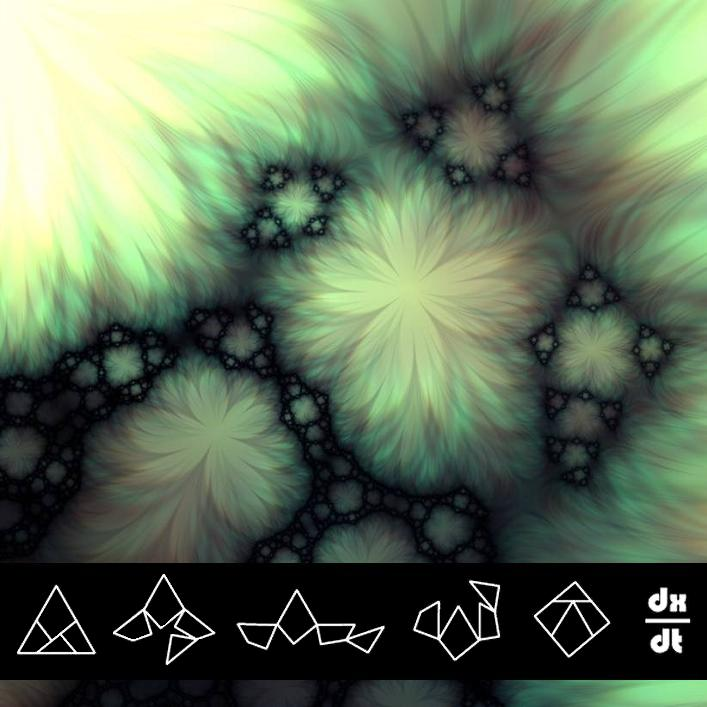
DXDT

The name dxdt was originally a collaborative name invented by Scott Hardy which included other artists although he now often refers to himself simply as dj dxdt.

In 2013, Hardy supported Luke Slater for part of his Australian tour.

== Published works ==
- Hardy, Scott (co-authored with George Dodd)(6 No 2, 21–26, 1994). Performance Variation of Panel-type Absorbers with Positioning of Flow Resistance. New Zealand Acoustics.
