= Paul Hardy =

Paul Hardy may refer to:

- Paul Hardy (politician) (born 1942), American attorney and lieutenant governor of Louisiana
- Paul Hardy (baseball) (1910–1979), American baseball catcher
- Paul Hardy (illustrator) (1862–1942), English illustrator
