= Pierre Hardy =

Pierre Hardy may refer to:

- Pierre Hardy (athlete) (1907–2000), French Olympic athlete
- Pierre Hardy (fashion designer) (born 1956), French footwear designer
