= Thomas Hardy (disambiguation) =

Thomas Hardy (1840–1928) was an English novelist, short-story writer and poet.

Tom Hardy (born 1977) is an English stage, film and television actor.

Thomas or Tom Hardy may also refer to:

== Academia and science ==
- Thomas Hardy (minister) (1747–1798), Scottish minister and professor of ecclesiastical history
- Thomas Duffus Hardy (1804–1878), English antiquary and archivist
- Thomas Lionel Hardy (1887–1969), British physician and gastroenterologist

== Arts and entertainment ==
- Thomas Hardy (English painter) (1757–1804), English painter whose works include a portrait of Joseph Haydn
- Thomas Bush Hardy (1842–1897), British marine painter and watercolourist
- Tom Hardy (designer) (born 1946), American design strategist
- Thee Tom Hardy, American rapper formerly signed to It's a Wonderful World Music Group

=== Fictional characters ===
- Thomas Hardy, a fictional character played by Bruce Willis in the 1993 film Striking Distance
- Tom Hardy, a fictional character played by John Travolta in the 2003 film Basic
- Tom Hardy (General Hospital), a fictional character on the soap opera General Hospital
- Tommy Hardy, a fictional character on the soap opera General Hospital

== Government, military, and politics ==
- Thomas Hardy (political reformer) (1752–1832), British political reformer and an object of the 1794 Treason Trials
- Thomas Hardy (Royal Navy officer, died 1732) (1666–1732), admiral and member of parliament for Weymouth and Melcombe Regis
- Sir Thomas Hardy, 1st Baronet (1769–1839), British naval officer

== Sports ==
- Tom Hardy (soccer), American soccer defender
- Thomas Hardy (rugby league) (fl. 1930s–1940s), English rugby league footballer

== Other uses ==
- Thomas Hardy (winemaker) (1830–1912), Australian founder of the Hardy Wine Company
