= David Costley =

Canadian bear hunter (1837–1923)

- Born: David Trueman Costley; 24 August 1837; New Ross, Chester, Lunenburg County, Nova Scotia, Canada
- Died: 3 November 1923 (aged 86); New Ross, Chester, Lunenburg County, Nova Scotia, Canada
- Other names: The Bear Hunter; King David
- Occupations: Farmer; Hunter

David Costley (24 August 1837 – 3 November 1923) was a Canadian bear hunter and farmer who was active in Nova Scotia.

== Early life ==
David Trueman Costley was born in New Ross, Chester, Lunenburg County, Nova Scotia, Canada on 24 August 1837. Joseph Costley, his father, came from England, and his mother, Hannah Melvin, was a native of Nova Scotia. David had a brother, Amos, and a sister, Sarah.

== Career ==
With a large family to support, David Costley farmed and trapped beaver, otter, mink, and fox for income. Bounties on dead animals were common for many years. Costley became active as a bear hunter and guide from 1852 until 1922. The skins from Costley's hunts in Blue Mountain were taken to buyers in Kentville, Kings County.

Supplying black bear fur for the Queen's Coldstream Guards' bearskins brought David Costley into contact with Queen Victoria, who invited him to London in 1897 to show her appreciation. Since Costley couldn't travel to meet her, the Queen sent him a medal, a gold ring studded with jewels, a Winchester Model 1886, and a collection of personal letters.

== Personal life ==
At 27 years old, Costley married Elizabeth Lockhart on 6 July 1867 on Horton Road (now New Ross Road) in Lunenburg County. They had four daughters and two sons. Their daughter Sarah Lavenia was born in Blue Mountain on 28 May 1870.

== Death ==
David Costley died at 86 years old on 3 November 1923 in New Ross, Chester, Lunenburg County, Nova Scotia, Canada. He succumbed to injuries after a fall from a ladder that resulted in punctured lungs on 27 October. Costley was buried in his hometown of New Ross on 6 November 1923.

== Legacy ==
Costley officially recorded 144 bear kills, based solely on his registered count. Among his kills, 122 were sent to London to be fashioned into caps for the ceremonial guards at Buckingham Palace. Bear River's Mike Parker wrote about Costley in "Guides of the North Woods" in 2004.
