= Adolphe-Maria Gustave Hardy =

French prelate

- Bishop of Diocese of Beauvais Emeritus
- Church: Roman Catholic Church
- See: Vicariate Apostolic of Napo
- In office: 1985 – 1995
- Predecessor: Jacques André Marie Jullien
- Successor: Guy Marie Alexandre Thomazeau

Orders
- Ordination: 31 March 1945

Personal details
- Born: 23 July 1920 Nantes, France
- Died: 9 August 2011 (aged 91)

Adolphe-Maria Gustave Hardy (23 July 1920 – 9 August 2011) was a French prelate of the Roman Catholic Church who served as bishop of the Diocese of Beauvais, France from 1985 to 1995.

== Biography ==
Hardy was born in Nantes, France, and was ordained a priest on 31 March 1945. Hardy was appointed bishop of the Diocese of Beauvais on 13 April 1985 and was ordained bishop on 12 May 1985. Hardy continued serving the Diocese of Beauvais until his retirement on 13 May 1995.
