= Siméon-Prosper Hardy =

French printer and bookseller

- Born: 1729; Paris, Kingdom of France
- Died: 1 April 1806 (aged 76–77); Paris, First French Empire
- Occupations: Printer; Bookseller
- Known for: Keeping a detailed journal of daily life in 18th-century Paris
- Notable work: Mes loisirs, ou journal d'événemens tels qu'ils parviennent à ma connaissance

Siméon-Prosper Hardy (1729 – 1806) was a French printer and bookseller who is known for writing a detailed journal about daily life and events in 18th-century Paris, from 1753 to October 1789. Hardy's journal, called Mes loisirs, ou journal d'événemens tels qu'ils parviennent à ma connaissance (transl. My Leisures, or a journal of events as they come to my knowledge), consists of 4100 folio pages and is considered a seminal historical record of pre-revolutionary France.

== Biography ==
Siméon-Prosper Hardy was born in 1726 in Paris and likely spent his entire life on the Rive Gauche (transl. Left Bank), living on Montagne Sainte-Geneviève and Rue Saint-Jacques at different times. His father was a lawyer in parlement and advisor to the king, and his mother was the daughter of the rector of the University of Paris. He was a Jansenist. His position in society placed him squarely in the Parisian bourgeoisie.

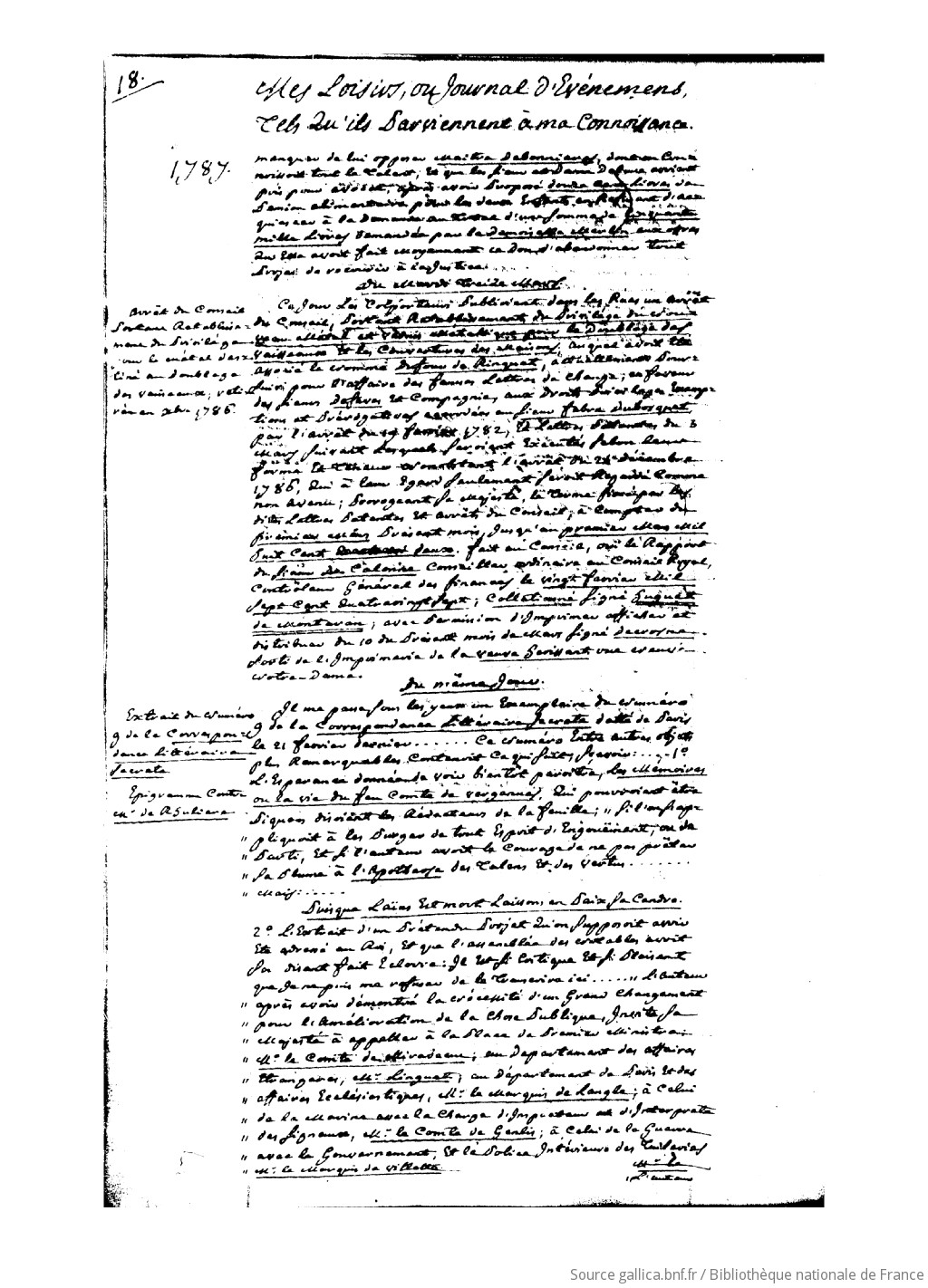
Scan of handwritten page from Hardy's journal

Hardy started his journal Mes loisirs in 1753 when he was a bookseller's apprentice, and he originally wrote journal entries in ledgers intended for his bookstore, La Colonne d'Or.

He became a master bookseller on 15 May 1755. In June 1771, he was appointed Deputy Syndic of the guild of booksellers. In April 1789, he participated in the National Assembly and represented the Third Estate of the Estates-General during the start of the French Revolution.

== Journal ==
Mes loisirs includes Hardy's observations of daily life, anecdotes, and excerpts from documents that he transcribed and cited from 1753 to October 1789. It also consists of rumors that he learned from his servant, who was able to go to places that Hardy himself could not, as well as information he gathered from his in-laws and their social circles. Despite the liberalization of news during his lifetime, there was still censorship that made it necessary to learn scandalous political information by word-of-mouth.

His journal is contemporary to Edmond Jean François Barbier's Chronique, which was written between 1718 and 1763.
