= Matthew Hardy (stalker) =

British cyberstalker

Matthew James Hardy (born 1991/2) is an English cyberstalker who pleaded guilty to harassing women online. A native of Northwich, Cheshire, he is believed to have affected 63 victims over 11 years, making him one of the most prolific cyberstalkers in the UK.

== Stalking ==
Hardy began stalking in 2009 while still in school, choosing schoolmates as victims. He created fake profiles on social media in attempt to befriend his victims, sometimes impersonating friends and family members, in some cases spreading rumours about them.

== Criminal convictions ==
Hardy has been arrested 10 times and voluntarily questioned three times. In October 2011, Hardy pleaded guilty to hacking the Facebook account of a former schoolmate and impersonating her; he received a restraining order, a suspended prison sentence and 250 hours of community service. He pleaded guilty to harassment and hacking of another schoolmate in 2013 and was given a suspended sentence and a restraining order. He was arrested in February 2020 and charged in March 2021. He pleaded guilty to three counts of stalking with intent to cause alarm or distress, two counts of stalking without intent to cause alarm, and breaching a restraining order from 2013 which banned him from using false details on social networking sites. He was sentenced to nine years in prison, the longest sentence handed to a cyberstalker in the UK. His barrister argued that the sentence was excessive because Hardy is autistic and was incapable of understanding the impact of his actions on his victims. The sentence was reduced to eight years on appeal.

== Podcast ==
Hardy was the subject of The Guardian's first standalone true crime podcast series, Can I Tell You a Secret? In the six-part podcast, Guardian reporter Sirin Kale explores Hardy's motivations and the impact of his crimes on his victims. It was named one of the best podcasts of 2023 by Esquire, and was adapted into a Netflix documentary that was released in February 2024.
