= Allen Hardy =

English footballer

Personal information
- Full name: Allen Hardy
- Date of birth: 1873
- Place of birth: Ilkeston, England
- Date of death: 1950 (aged 76–77)
- Position: Full back

Senior career*
Years	Team	Apps	(Gls)
1898–1899	Ilkeston Town		
1899–1900	Wigan County		
1900–1902	Blackburn Rovers	42	(0)
Total		42	(0)
- * Club domestic league appearances and goals

Allen Hardy (1873–1950) was an English footballer who played in the Football League for Blackburn Rovers.
