= Clarion Hardy =

American football and baseball coach (1877–1936)

Biographical details
- Born: October 2, 1877; Dow City, Iowa, U.S.
- Died: June 23, 1936 (aged 58); Evanston, Illinois, U.S.
- Education: Dakota Wesleyan

Coaching career (HC unless noted)

Football
- 1902: Dakota Wesleyan
- 1907–1908: Dakota Wesleyan
- 1913–1914: Dakota Wesleyan

Baseba
- 1905–1910: Dakota Wesleyan
- 1913: Dakota Wesleyan

Head coaching record
- Overall: 16–14–2 (football)

Clarion DeWitt Hardy (October 2, 1877 – June 27, 1936) was an American college football and college baseball coach. He served as the head football coach at Dakota Wesleyan University in three separate stints (1902, 1907–1908, and 1913–1914) compiling a record of 16–14–2. Hardy also had two stints at the head baseball coach at Dakota Wesleyan, from 1905 to 1910 and again in 1913. He later served as a public speaking and debate professor at Northwestern University.

== Head coaching record ==
=== Football ===
Year	Team	Overall	Conference	Standing	Bowl/playoffs
Dakota Wesleyan (Independent) (1902)
1902	Dakota Wesleyan	3–1–1			
Dakota Wesleyan (Independent) (1907–1908)
1907	Dakota Wesleyan	3–3			
1908	Dakota Wesleyan	3–3			
Dakota Wesleyan (Independent) (1913–1914)
1913	Dakota Wesleyan	1–5–1			
1914	Dakota Wesleyan	6–2			
Dakota Wesleyan:		16–14–2			
Total:		16–14–2			
