= Louis Petit de Bachaumont =

French writer (1690–1771)

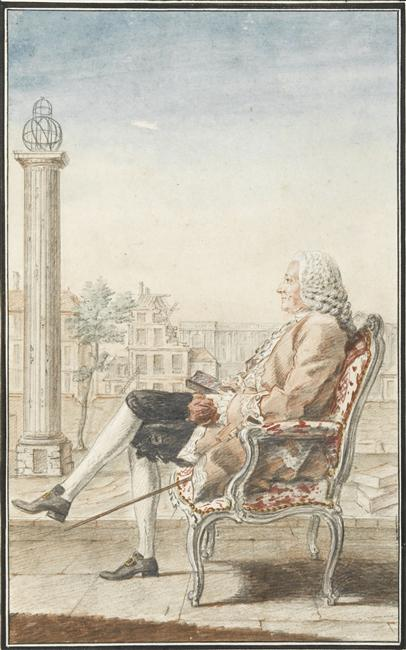
Louis Petit de Bachaumont in a fauteuil, by Carmontelle, 1761; in the background the Hôtel de Rouillé is being demolished, to free the classic facade of the Louvre Colonnade

Louis Petit de Bachaumont (pronounced [lwi p(ə)ti də baʃomɔ̃]; June 2, 1690 – April 29, 1771) was a French writer, whose historical interest has been connected largely to his alleged role in the gossipy Mémoires secrets pour servir à l'histoire de la République des Lettres. A modern biography brought to general attention his other roles, as an arbiter of taste, an influential art critic and an urbaniste.

Petit de Bachaumont was of noble family and was brought up at the court of Versailles. He passed his whole life in Paris, however, as the centre of the salon of Marie Anne Doublet (1677–1771), where criticism of art and literature took the form of malicious gossip. A sort of register of news was kept in a journal of the salon, starting in 1762, which dealt largely in scandals and contained accounts of books suppressed by the censor. Bachaumont's name is commonly connected with the first volumes of this register, which was published anonymously, long after Petit de Bachaumont's death, under the title Mémoires secrets pour servir à l'histoire de la République des Lettres, but his exact share in the authorship of those years before his death in 1771 is a matter of controversy. The register was continued by Pidansat de Mairobert (1707–1779), who may have had a greater hand in it from the start, and by others, until it reached 36 volumes (covering the years 1774-1779). It is of some value as a historical source, especially for prohibited literature, and full of anecdotes, for which it was sieved by the brothers Goncourt, who revived interest in this obscure figure, whom they presented as the anecdotier parfait, the reputation, as the "perfect recounter of anecdote" to the present time.

Petit de Bachaumont's studied "indolence", remarked upon in his obituary, was a stylish pose. His major published writings are Essai sur la peinture, la sculpture et l'architecture (1751) and his surveys of the Paris Salons of 1767 and 1769, in which aesthetics and cultural politics were inseparably entwined. Less noted is his published call in 1749 for the roofing-over of the classical colonnaded east front of the Palais du Louvre and the clearing away of the ramshackle structures, both those that had been built against it, in order to form a proper Palais du Louvre, and those in the centre of the Cour Carrée itself Sections of the palace were in danger of collapse, scarcely touched by royal indifference after 1678; work did begin in 1755 to clear the facade of the Louvre, overseen by the architect Jacques-Germain Soufflot and Marigny, supervisor of the Bâtiments du Roi.

As a critic of art, his recommendation of a young artist named François Boucher appeared in a design memorandum Bachaumont presented the duc de Bouillon, who was occupied with renovating interiors at the Château de Navarre in Normandy, in 1730: "he is very quick, works fast and is not expensive".

See, in addition to the memoirs of the time, especially the Correspondance littéraire of Grimm, Diderot, d'Alembert and others (new ed-, Paris, 1878); Ch. Aubertin, L'Esprit public au XVIII^{e} siècle (Paris, 1872).

== Sources ==
- Author and Book Info.com
