= Willis Hardy =

Australian rules footballer

Personal information
- Full name: Willis Hardy
- Born: 3 March 1897
- Died: 7 April 1972 (aged 75)
- Original team: Carton District

Playing career^{1}
Years	Club	Games (Goals)
1917	Carlton	3 (1)
- ^{1} Playing statistics correct to the end of 1917.

Willis Hardy (3 March 1897 – 7 April 1972) was an Australian rules footballer who played with Carlton in the Victorian Football League (VFL).
