= Arthur C. Hardy =

- Born: 1895
- Died: 1977 (aged 81–82)
- Scientific career
- Fields: Physics

Arthur Cobb Hardy (1895–1977) was president of the Optical Society of America from 1935-36. He was awarded the Edward Longstreth Medal from the Franklin Institute in 1939 and the Frederic Ives Medal in 1957. He was part of the inaugural class of Fellows of the Optical Society of America in 1959.

Hardy graduated from the University of California in 1917. Upon graduation, he joined the US Army, where he served in the American Expeditionary Force as a Commanding Officer in the Photographic Section. He joined Kodak Research Laboratories after World War I.

In 1922, Hardy was appointed Assistant Professor in Optics and Photography at the Massachusetts Institute of Technology (MIT). At MIT, he developed the recording spectrophotometer, which transformed the study of color.

== See also ==
- Optical Society of America#Past Presidents of the OSA
