= Matthew P. Hardy =

American reproductive biologist

- Born: 1957; Evanston, Illinois, United States
- Died: November 4, 2007 (aged 49–50); New York City, United States
- Education: University of Virginia
- Spouse: Dianne O. Hardy
- Scientific career
- Fields: reproductive biology

Matthew Phillip Hardy (1957-2007) was an American reproductive biologist who has made fundamental contributions in Leydig cell differentiation and function.

== Biography ==
M. P. Hardy was born in Evanston, Illinois, completed elementary education at the Sidwell Friends School in Washington, DC. He received a double bachelor's degree in biology and philosophy from Oberlin College in 1979, and received a Ph.D. in Biology at the University of Virginia in 1985. Then Hardy conducted postdoctoral work with Larry L. Ewing at The Johns Hopkins School of Hygiene and Public Health. In 1990, he joined the Population Council, and became a Senior Scientist several years later.

Hardy's research focus on the origin and development of Leydig cells in the adult mammalian testis, which from stem Leydig cells (SLC) to progenitor Leydig cells (PLC) to immature Leydig cells (ILC) and finally to adult Leydig cells (ALC). He identified this sequence in detail in morphological, physiological, biochemical and molecular methodologies. He also revealed the role of luteinizing hormone (LH) in the androgenesis of adult Leydig cells.

He died suddenly after accomplishing the 2007 New York City Marathon.
