= Lawrence Hardy =

English footballer

Personal information
- Full name: Lawrence Richard Hardy
- Date of birth: 28 February 1913
- Place of birth: South Bank, England
- Height: 5 ft 9 in (1.75 m)
- Position: Inside right

Youth career
- South Bank East End

Senior career*
Years	Team	Apps	(Gls)
1932–1937	Hartlepools United	150	(26)
1937–1938	Bradford City	12	(2)
- Shrewsbury Town
Total		162	(28)
- * Club domestic league appearances and goals

Lawrence Richard Hardy (28 February 1913 – after 1937) was an English professional footballer who played as an inside right.

== Career ==
Born in South Bank, Hardy played for South Bank East End, Hartlepools United, Bradford City and Shrewsbury Town.

For Bradford City he made 12 appearances in the Football League.

== Sources ==
- Frost, Terry (1988). Bradford City A Complete Record 1903-1988. Breedon Books Sport. ISBN 0-907969-38-0.
