= Mémoires secrets =

Mémoires secrets pour servir à l'histoire de la République des Lettres en France depuis 1762 jusqu'à nos jours

The Mémoires secrets pour servir à l'histoire de la République des Lettres en France depuis 1762 jusqu'à nos jours ("Secret Memoirs Serving as a History of the Republic of Letters in France from 1762 until Our Days") is an anonymous chronicle of events that occurred between 1762 and 1787. Historian Dena Goodman thinks it started as a manuscript newsletter emanating from Paris. It was first published in London as a multi-volume set from 1781 to 1789. Thus, although the entries bear exact dates, they were not published until long after the events they describe.

The Mémoires secrets offer an abundance of details about literary life in the 18th century: "At the center of the most brilliant debates for a quarter of a century, whether concerning the battle against the Jesuits, the opposition [between the Parlement of Paris and the French King], well-known affairs such as the affair of the diamond necklace, or the emergence of new aesthetics such as the bourgeois drama, Gluckist opera, Shakespeare's works, they gave an account, almost from day to day, in manners sometimes engaged and sometimes distanced, indignant, or sarcastic, of ephemeral or profound movements of public opinion in the course of constituting itself."

== The authors ==
The work is attributed to Louis Petit de Bachaumont (1690–1771), but it is unlikely that he was the actual author, since all volumes describe events which occurred after his death. It is currently attributed to Mathieu-François Pidansat de Mairobert and Mouffle d’Angerville, but it is likely that the text is the work of multiple authors.

== The text ==
There are eighteen volumes, each of which covers one or two years of events. The text consists of short, anonymous reports, each with an exact date, on political and cultural events. Some volumes have an "Additions" section which contains reports from prior years. Political and social figures, literary figures, actors, artists, musicians, scientists, doctors, and royal mistresses are discussed. Some of the most frequently-mentioned individuals are Voltaire, Linguet, Necker, the Duke of Orléans, La Harpe, Rousseau, Marmontel, Turgot, the Comte d'Artois, the duc de Richelieu, and Cardinal de Rohan.

In 1830, Ravenel issued a critical edition of the first four volumes and Paul Lacroix made an abridged edition in 1858. An alphabetical index of the authors and people cited in the Mémoires secrets appeared in Brussels and Paris in 1866: it is entitled Table alphabétique des auteurs et personnages cités dans les "Mémoires secrets pour servir à l'histoire de la république des lettres en France" rédigés par Bachaumont and is an indispensable tool for locating these within the work. The entire text is available online from the Bibliothèque nationale de France. A new printed edition is being prepared.

== Sources ==
- Note by Tawfik Mekki Berrada in the Dictionnaire des Journaux, 1600-1789, published by J. Sgard, 1991.
