= Adolphe-Marie Hardy =

Belgian writer (1868–1954)

Adolphe-Marie Hardy (23 May 1868 in Dison – 19 June 1954 in Laeken) was a Belgian writer first published in 1888. He rose to become a major figure in French-language literature.

Hardy was educated at Herve, before starting at the University of Louvain in 1886, studying law. After he got his doctorate he returned to Dison, where he carried on his literary work and also worked as a lawyer. Hardy was editor or assistant editor of several literary journals from 1900 onward, including Rappel de Charleroi, Dépêche de Liège and the Journal de Bruxelles.

In 1931 Hardy received the Grand Prix de Langue française from the French Academy. He was the first Belgian to win the prize, and he won it for his poem "Le Cortège des mois". In 1935 he married Madeleine Verhelst. In 1940, they escaped to Issigeac, France. After his wife's death, in 1941, he married Germaine Van Den Boeck. In May 1954 he was made a Freeman of the City of Dison, and died at Laeken on 19 June of that year.

Charles Ranhofer, chef at Delmonico's, honoured Hardy early in his publishing career by naming a goose liver pate after him, and Ranhofer's book "The Epicurean", also lists a chicken dish, Cotelettes de poulet à l'Adolphe Hardy.

== Related pages ==
- List of foods named after people

== Other websites ==
- Friends of Adolphe Hardy
- Adolphe Hardy's House, Wallonia Tourist Office
