= Ange Hardy =

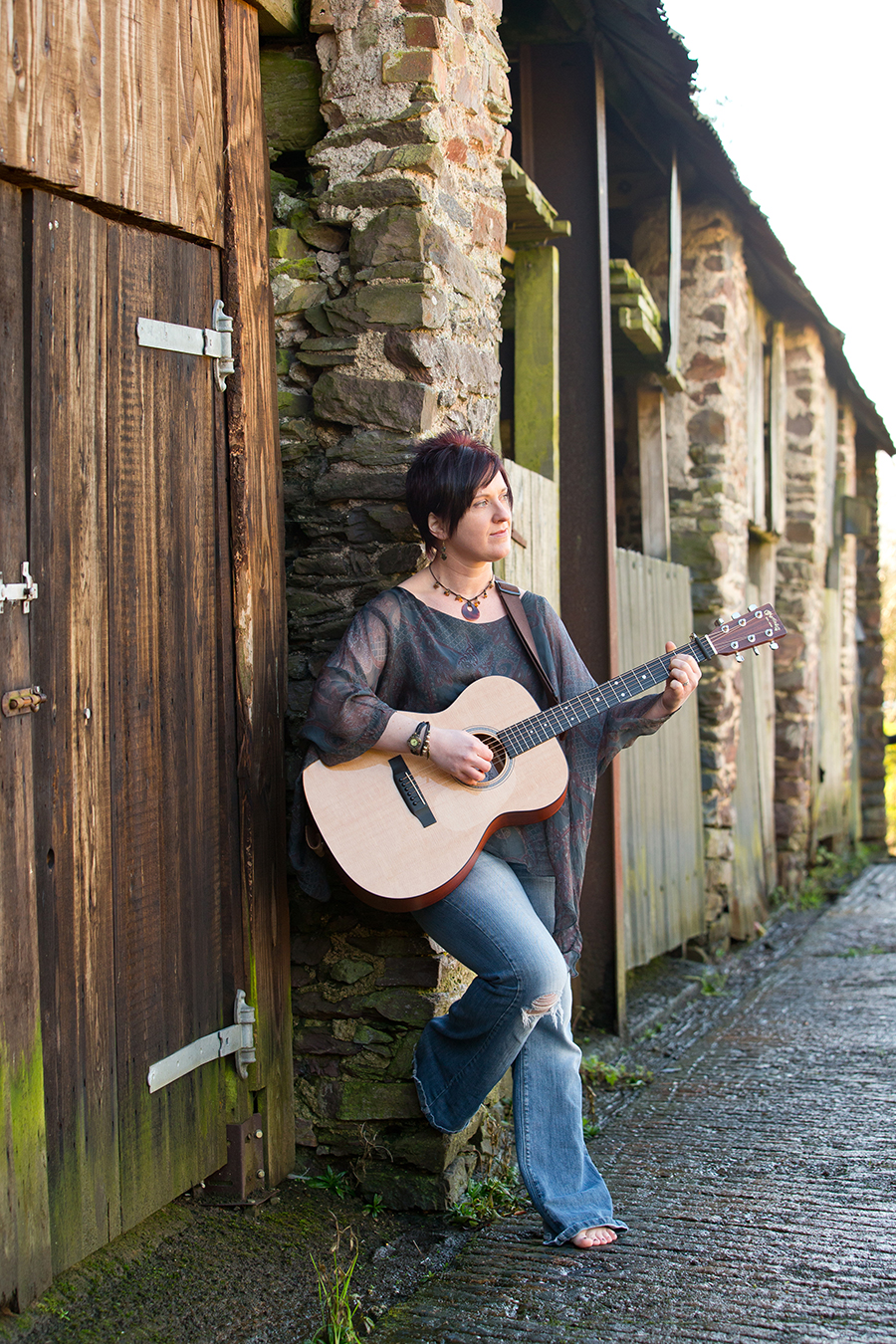
- Hardy in 2014

Background information
- Born: December 1983 (age 42)
- Genres: English folk music
- Instruments: Guitar, vocals
- Years active: 2010–present
- Label: Story Records
- Website: angehardy.com

Ange Hardy (born December 1983) is an English singer, songwriter and recording artist.

Ange Hardy performs original contemporary songs with an emphasis on vocal harmony. Her debut album Windmills and Wishes was released in 2010, and her second album, Bare Foot Folk, in 2013. Her third album The Lament of The Black Sheep was released on 13 September 2014, with pre-release copies shipped in May 2014. All three have been released by the Story Records label. Although Windmills and Wishes was her debut studio album, Bare Foot Folk is often referred to as her debut album, as it was widely publicised as being her "debut folk album", following her decision to adhere more strictly to a defined genre.

== History ==
In 2010, Hardy released Windmills and Wishes, an album which failed to gain much traction at the time.

She was an Isambard Nu-Folk Award Finalist 2011 at Bristol Folk Festival.

In 2013, Hardy released Bare Foot Folk, a 14-track album of original acoustic folk songs. This second offering was received with critical acclaim. On 11 May 2013, Hardy was the special guest on BBC Somerset's Somerset Lives show, and Bare Foot Folk was BBC Somerset's album of the week for the duration of the following week.

On 8 January 2014, Hardy was awarded '2013 Female Vocalist of the Year' by FATEA Magazine, where she was one of three nominees alongside Lucy Ward and Emily Barker. In January 2014, Hardy was also a New Folk Competition Finalist at Warwick Folk Festival.

Subsequently, her follow-up album The Lament of The Black Sheep was made "Album of the Week" on BBC Scotland's the Iain Anderson Show. It was also awarded "Album of the Month" by FolkWords in June 2014. On 9 January 2014, Hardy won the FATEA '2014 Album of The Year' for The Lament of The Black Sheep, where she was nominated alongside Nancy Kerr and Sam Amidon.

The Lament of The Black Sheep was awarded 5 stars by The Daily Telegraph.

Hardy was nominated for the Horizon Award at the 2015 BBC Radio 2 Folk Awards.

Her 2016 album, Findings, with Lukas Drinkwater was launched live of the BBC Radio 2 Folk Show with Mark Radcliffe.

Her sixth studio album Bring Back Home, was released on 28 November 2017.

== Live performances ==
A notable aspect of Hardy's live performance is that she uses a loop machine for layering vocal harmonies live on stage. Traditionally such pedals are used for looping instrumental backing tracks rather than being used for vocal harmony.

She has performed at wide range of festivals including Sark Folk Festival, Cambridge Folk Festival, Sidmouth Folk Festival, The Festival at the Edge, The Great Big Almonry Folk Festival, Bath Folk Festival, Bristol Folk Festival, Home Farm Festival, Stogumber Festival, Folk on the Farm, Crowcombe Festival, Dunster Music Festival, Barry Folk Festival, Priston Festival and Dunster by Candlelight.

During her Bare Foot Folk tour, Hardy performed at The Regal Theatre in Minehead, The Merlin Theatre in Frome, and The Glastonbury Assembly Rooms as well as a large number of smaller venues.

Hardy occasionally performs live with The Bare Foot Band.

== Samuel Taylor Coleridge ==
In 2015, Hardy was awarded funding from Arts Council England, to write original folk songs based on the life and work of the romantic poet, Samuel Taylor Coleridge. That body of work was released as her third album Esteesee.

== Personal life ==
Hardy has two children and lives with her husband Rob in Somerset, England. Her songs often contain biographical information. At the age of 14, Hardy ran away from a children's home in Taunton and hitchhiked to Ireland where she spent four months living homeless on the streets, before eventually returning home to the West Country.

== Discography ==
=== Albums ===
- Windmills and Wishes (released 5 September 2010)
- Bare Foot Folk (released 15 May 2013)
- The Lament of the Black Sheep (released 13 September 2014)
- The Little Holly Tree (EP, released December 2014)
- Esteesee (released 24 November 2015)
- When Christmas Day is Near (EP, released 10 December 2015)
- Findings (released 14 November 2016)
- Bring Back Home (released 28 November 2017)

== Reviews ==
- Albion Magazine review of Bare Foot Folk
- Art of the Torch Singer review of Bare Foot Folk
- Bright Young Folk review of Bare Foot Folk
- Fatea Magazine review of Bare Foot Folk
- Folk and Roots review of Bare Foot Folk
- FolkWords review of Bare Foot Folk
- Irish Music Magazine of review Bare Foot Folk
- Nicky Rossiter review of Bare Foot Folk
- Further compilation of reviews of Bare Foot Folk
