= Robin Hardy (American writer) =

American novelist

- Born: January 1955 (age 71); Fort Worth, Texas, U.S.
- Education: Baylor University
- Occupation: Author

Robin Moore Hardy (born January 1955) is the author of more than twenty published books and several unpublished manuscripts. She currently resides in North Texas. Her first novel, Chataine's Guardian, was the runner-up for the Gold Medallion Book Award in 1985.

== Biography ==
Robin Moore was born in Fort Worth, Texas in January 1955. When she was seventeen, a severe sinus infection rendered her profoundly deaf in both ears. After high school, she moved to Waco to attend college at Baylor University, where she graduated Phi Beta Kappa in 1977. Shortly thereafter she was employed as an editor with Word Publishing. Moore married in 1976, but did not have children until after her mother died from colon cancer in 1978. After the birth of her first child in 1981 Moore became a homemaker, and this gave her the impetus to become a story-teller.

In her early twenties, Robin Hardy discovered literature professor and Christian apologetic C. S. Lewis. She was profoundly affected by his commitment to the story and accessible style, and she determined to apply those principles in her works. Other influences include Saki, Samuel Rutherford, Hannah Whitall Smith and J. B. Phillips.

As apparent from her turbulent publishing history, Hardy has been an author ahead of her time. She writes from a Christian perspective, but her books are often too controversial for Christian audiences due to their realistic and uncomfortably penetrating nature. In spite of this, however, she has acquired a following over the last twenty years, and has set a precedent followed by more well-known authors like Francine Rivers.

Hardy was carried by both Word Publishers and NavPress. She is currently the primary author for Westford Press.

== Bibliography ==
Hardy's published books include:

- The Annals of Lystra: Chataine's Guardian (Word, 1984)
  - Reprinted by NavPress, 1994
  - Currently in print by Westford Press, 2004
- The Annals of Lystra: Stone of Help (Word, 1985)
  - Reprinted by NavPress, 1994
  - Currently in print by Westford Press, 2005
- The Annals of Lystra: High Lord of Lystra (Word, 1985)
  - Reprinted by NavPress, 1994. The title was changed to Liberation of Lystra.
  - Currently in print by Westford Press, 2006
- Streiker's Bride (NavPress, 1993)
  - Reprinted by Westford Press, 2004
- Streiker the Killdeer (NavPress, 1994)
  - Reprinted by Westford Press, 2004
- Padre (NavPress, 1994)
  - Reprinted by Westford Press, 2007
- Streiker's Morning Sun (NavPress, 1995)
  - Reprinted by Westford Press, 2004
- Sammy: Dallas Detective (Vital Issues Press, 1997)
  - Reprinted by Westford Press, 2004
- Sifted but Saved by W.W. Melton (Broadman & Holman, 2001)
- Sammy: Women Troubles (Westford Press, 2004)
- Sammy: Working for a Living (Westford Press, 2004)
- The Latter Annals of Lystra: Nicole of Prie Mer (Westford Press, 2004)
- The Latter Annals of Lystra: Ares of Westford (Westford Press, 2004)
- Sammy: On Vacation (Westford Press, 2005)
- The Latter Annals of Lystra: Prisoners of Hope (Westford Press, 2005)
- Sammy: Little Misunderstandings (Westford Press, 2006)
- The Latter Annals of Lystra: Road of Vanishing (Westford Press, 2006)
- His Strange Ways: The Sequel to Padre (Westford Press, 2007)
- Sammy: Ghosts (Westford Press, 2007)
- The Latter Annals of Lystra: Dead Man's Token (Westford Press, 2007)
- The Idecis (Westford Press, 2008)
