= Transplantation (journal) =

- Discipline: Transplantation medicine
- Language: English
- Edited by: Stefan Tullius

Publication details
- History: 1963-present
- Publisher: Wolters Kluwer on behalf of The Transplantation Society and the International Liver Transplantation Society
- Frequency: Monthly
- Impact factor: 5.5 (2023)

Standard abbreviations
- ISO 4: Transplantation

Indexing
- CODEN: TRPLAU
- ISSN: 0041-1337 (print); 1365-2249 (web)
- LCCN: 64005482
- OCLC no.: 1767703

Links
- Journal homepage; Online access; Online archive; Instructions for Authors; Journal Submission Site; Transplantation Direct (sister journal)

Transplantation is a peer-reviewed medical journal covering transplantation medicine. The editor-in-chief is Stefan G. Tullius (Harvard University). It was established in 1963 and is published by Wolters Kluwer on behalf of The Transplantation Society.

Its sister journal, Transplantation Direct, is an online-only open access, peer-reviewed medical journal also covering transplantation medicine, established in 2015. The journal's editor-in-chief is Edward K. Geissler (University of Regensburg).

== Abstracting and indexing ==
The journal is abstracted and indexed in:

- BIOSIS Previews
- Current Contents/Life Sciences
- Index Medicus/MEDLINE/PubMed
- Science Citation Index
- Scopus

According to the Journal Citation Reports, the journal has a 2023 impact factor of 5.5, ranking it 38 out of 181 journals in the category "Immunology", 14 out of 292 journals in the category "Surgery", and 3 out of 31 journals in the category "Transplantation".
