= Don Hardy (cricketer) =

English cricketer

Personal information
- Full name: Donald Wrightson Hardy
- Born: 24 March 1926; East Boldon, County Durham, England
- Died: 16 January 1998 (aged 71); Felling, County Durham, England
- Batting: Right-handed
- Bowling: Right-arm medium

Domestic team information
- Years: Team
- 1965: Minor Counties
- 1948–1967: Durham

Career statistics
Competition	First-class	List A
Matches	1	3
Runs scored	29	15
Batting average	14.50	7.50
100s/50s	–/–	–/–
Top score	29	15
Balls bowled	–	6
Wickets	–	–
Bowling average	–	–
5 wickets in innings	–	–
10 wickets in match	–	–
Best bowling	–	–
Catches/stumpings	1/–	1/–
- Source: Cricinfo, 6 August 2011

Donald Wrightson Hardy (24 March 1926 – 16 January 1998) was an English cricketer. Hardy was a right-handed batsman who bowled right-arm medium pace. He was born in East Boldon, County Durham and educated at Worksop College.

Hardy made his debut for Durham against Northumberland in the 1948 Minor Counties Championship. He played Minor counties cricket for Durham from 1948 to 1967, making 138 Minor Counties Championship appearances. He made his List A debut against Hertfordshire in the 1964 Gillette Cup. He made 2 further List A appearances, against Sussex in the following round of the same competition, and Nottinghamshire in the 1967 Gillette Cup. In his 3 List A matches, he scored 15 runs at an average of 7.50, with a high score of 15. He captained Durham from 1955 to 1967.

He also played a single first-class match for the Minor Counties against the touring South Africans in 1965. He captained the team in this match, scoring 29 runs in the Minor Counties first innings, before being dismissed by Atholl McKinnon. In the second innings he was dismissed for a duck by Norman Crookes.

Hardy died in Felling, County Durham on 16 January 1998.
