= Alfred Hardy (architect) =

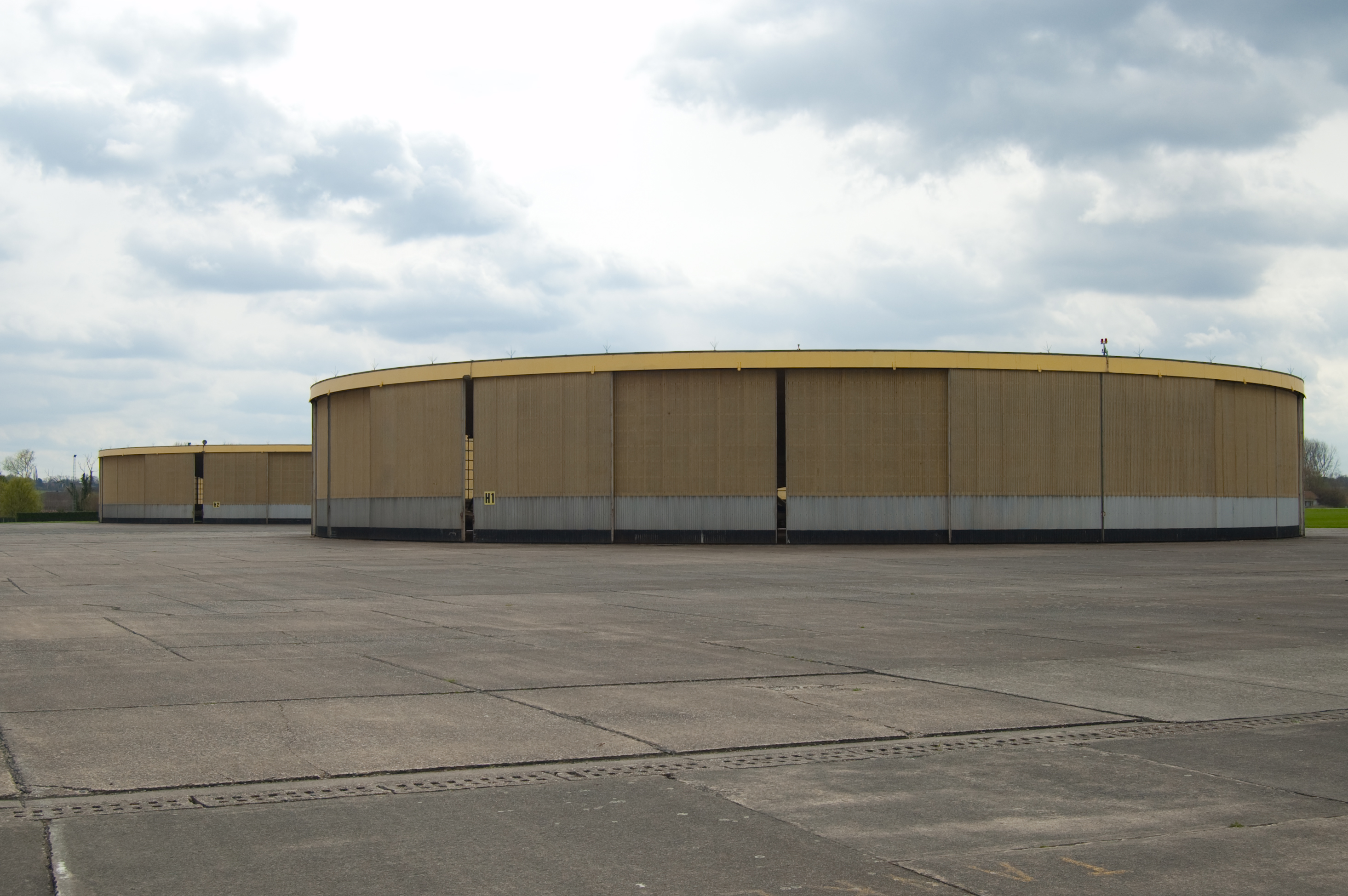
Aircraft hangars at Grimbergen Airfield designed by Hardy in 1947

Alfred Hardy (1900–1965) was a Belgian contractor and autodidact architect. He is best known for his thin-shell concrete constructions in the 1950s and 1960s.

== Biography ==
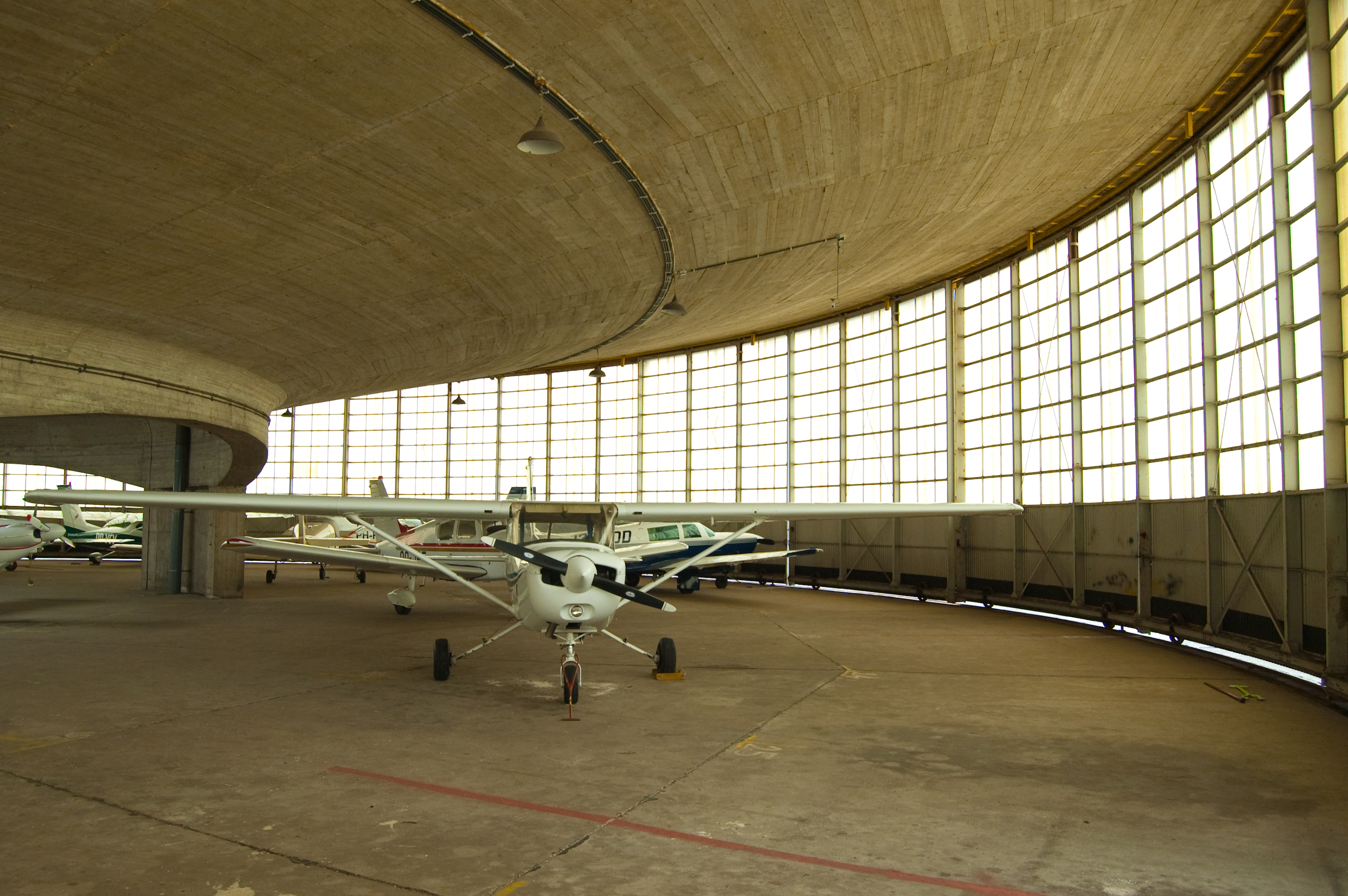
Interior of the Grimbergen airfield hangars

Born in Quiévrain, he came into contact during World War II with the Ghent Professor Gustave Magnel and Brussels contractor Emile Blaton. Alongside Polish engineer Simon Chaikes, in 1947 he designed two cylindrical aircraft hangars for the Grimbergen Airfield. This design was included in the Twentieth Century Engineering retrospective of 1964 in the New York Museum of Modern Art. His constructions contributed to the development of thin shells made out of reinforced concrete, later used by architects like Eero Saarinen or Félix Candela. The hangars are protected since 2007.

in 1954, he designed his house in Buizingen, Belgium. He also designed an agricultural shed in Villepreux in 1953, which was designated as a Monument historique in 2010.

Hardy married Emma Dassy and had two daughters (Nelly and Adrienne). He died in 1965 in a road accident.
