= Phillip E. Hardy =

American drummer and screenwriter

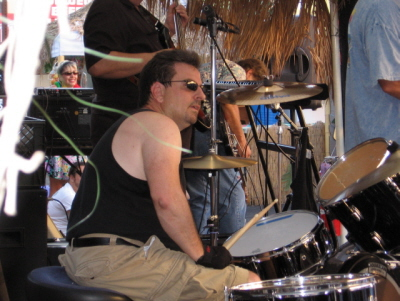

Phillip E. Hardy (born May 27, 1956) is an American screenwriter, music critic and musician.

He was born in Manhassett, New York.

== Career ==
Hardy began his drumming career in the mid-1970s, occasionally filling in as a substitute drummer for the Los Angeles punk band The Weasels. He also jammed and recorded with musicians including Dean Chamberlain, The Skulls, and opened for many notable LA rock bands.

During the 1980s he twice worked with Asylum Kids bassist and vocalist Dino Archon in bands named DV8 and Symbol Positive playing at Club Lingerie, Madame Wong's, and The Troubadour and on the Radio stage at the 1984 LA Street Scene. During the early 1990s, he fronted his own band, Badge of Honor, playing numerous live shows and had original songs featured on KLOS Radio Best of Local Licks show.

Hardy was awarded a Bachelor of Science in Business Management in 2001 and a Master of Management from the University of Redlands in 2003. In 2009, he completed the Project Manager Certificate Program at Stanford University. In January 2004, his album Old Dog, New Tricks was released and received positive reviews from publications including Fufkin magazine, Ripping Tracks and IOM magazine. Hardy released his second album Upon Politics, Love and Reflection in late September 2009. And has subsequently released the digital albums there's Not Enough Room on My Tombstone and The Vintage Years on CD Baby.

Hardy has played drums with several blues and rock artists, including Joe Houston, Marcella Detroit, Brian Ray, Jerry Cole and Guitar Shorty; and appeared as opening act for Canned Heat, The Motels, Rank and File and Animotion. Hardy has recently been performing with The Lively Ones of Pulp Fiction fame, in addition to New Blues Revolution, who performed at the 2010 Los Angeles Music Awards.

== Writings ==
Hardy is a contributor to Sound the Sirens and Hackwriters online magazines.

Most recently, Phillip has written several screenplays, including Purgatory Station, a feature (film) directed by Ethan Hegel and starring Bob Gunton, Angus Benfield, E.R. Ruiz, Marquel Skinner, and Sean O'Brien. Phillip also wrote the upcoming feature Madagascar Gold, an adventure (film) that will be directed by Marlin Darrah, The Apache Way, a (screenplay) Winner of the New York Movie Awards and Empire of Sin, winner, Best Thriller (Screenplay) at the LAFA (Los Angeles Film Awards). Phillip has placed and won at more than 300 film festivals and Screenplay contests and has signed 17 option and right-to-shop deals via Inktip Magazine and two agreements via Screenwriting Staffing. He also runs the private Facebook Group Screenwriters Talking Shop.
