= Samuel Hardy =

American lawyer and politician

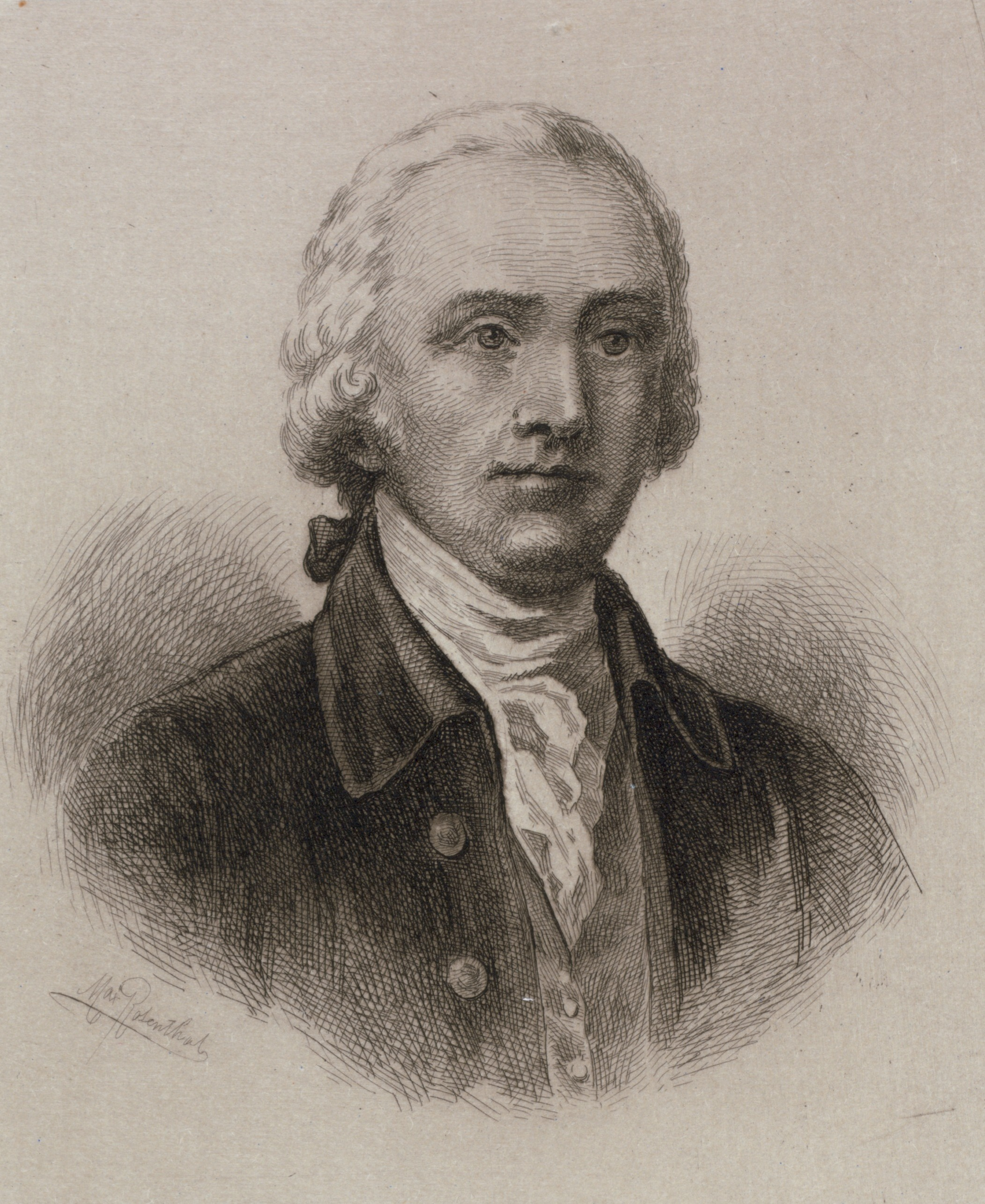

Delegate to the Continental Congress from Virginia
- In office 1783 – October 17, 1785 Serving with John Scarsbrook Wills

Member of the Virginia House of Delegates representing Isle of Wight County
- In office May 1, 1780 – May 1782 Serving with John Scarsbrook Wills
- Preceded by: Josiah Parker
- Succeeded by: Josiah Parker
- In office October 3, 1778 – May 3, 1779 Serving with John Scarsbrook Wills
- Preceded by: Josiah Parker
- Succeeded by: Josiah Parker

Personal details
- Born: May 1, 1753 Isle of Wight County, Virginia
- Died: October 17, 1785 (aged 27) New York City, New York
- Resting place: Saint Paul's Church Cemetery, New York City, New York
- Education: College of William and Mary
- Occupation: planter, businessperson, politician

Samuel Hardy (June 10, 1758 – October 17, 1785) was an American lawyer, planter, and politician who served as a delegate to the Continental Congress and in the Virginia House of Delegates, representing Isle of Wight County, as well as briefly on Virginia's Executive Council and as Lieutenant Governor of Virginia.

== Early and family life ==
Born in Isle of Wight County, Virginia, to the planter Richard Hardy (who served two terms in the House of Burgesses) and his wife, Samuel received a private education suitable to his class, including studies at Virginia's College of William and Mary to the extent that it was open during the American Revolutionary War from 1776 to 1781 and he was not serving in the legislature. His grandfather, George Hardy (or Harddie) had emigrated from England, established the family's plantations, and represented Isle of Wight County several times in the decade beginning in 1642. Samuel married and was survived by his widow and at least his sons Thomas and William, who served as his executors.

== Career ==
Following admission to the Virginia bar on October 1, 1778, Hardy began a law practice. Two days later, voters in Isle of Wight County first chose him to represent them to complete the term of Major Josiah Parker, who was leading Virginia troops with the Continental Army and had been disqualified by the Virginia House of Delegates in the term's first session but subsequently won re-election to serve alongside John Scarsbrook Wills, as did Hardy for three consecutive one-year terms (1780–1782). In June 1781 Hardy began his brief service on Virginia's Executive Council, and from May 29 to October 11, 1782, he served as Lieutenant Governor of Virginia.

Elected to the Continental Congress from Virginia, Hardy served from 1783 to 1785. On May 6, 1784, he voted against the resolution in the Congress restricting the salary of a foreign minister of the United States to $8,000, and on May 7, he opposed the motion that the salary of a United States Secretary for Foreign Affairs should not exceed $3,000 per annum. In May 1784, Hardy nominated Thomas Jefferson as minister plenipotentiary to Europe to assist John Adams and Benjamin Franklin in negotiating treaties of commerce, and in January 1785, was a member of a committee that reported on letters that had been received from United States ministers in Europe relative to a foreign loan.

== Death and legacy ==
Hardy died in New York City, New York while Congress was in session (then meeting in New York City), and is buried in St. Paul's Church Cemetery. His death and funeral were reported in many newspapers at the time such as in The Freeman's Journal of Philadelphia, Pennsylvania on October 26, 1785, on pages 2 and 3. The entire Congress and many dignitaries attended his funeral at St. Paul's Church.

Archivists at Trinity Church have not yet been able to locate Hardy's grave marker or records of his funeral in their files but agree that the newspaper story implies the funeral occurred and that he is buried there though records of that time may be incomplete. They have records that Rev. Beach and Rev. Provost, who gave the sermons according to the article, were there at the time but are unable to locate a copy of the specific sermons.

Hardy was a friend of Alexander Hamilton, who may have written a poetical tribute to his memory in the article although the authorship is in dispute.

The Virginia General Assembly named Hardy County (in what became West Virginia during the American Civil War) in his honor. His son William Hardy continued the family political tradition by representing Isle of Wight county in the 1793 and 1794 terms Their relation to a young lieutenant Samuel Hardy who fought with the 18th Virginia Infantry during the Civil War until losing his arm following a wound during the Battle of Gaines Mill in 1862 is unclear.
