= Warren Hardy =

American politician

Warren B. Hardy II

Member of the Nevada Senate from the Clark 12th district
- In office 2002 - 2009

Personal details
- Born: September 6, 1963 (age 63) Salt Lake City, Utah
- Party: Republican
- Spouse: Carol
- Profession: builder and contractor

Warren B. Hardy II is a Republican member of the Nevada Senate, who represened Clark County District 12 (map) from 2002 - 2009. He also served in the Nevada Assembly in 1991.
