= Arthur Hardy (footballer) =

English footballer

Personal information
- Full name: Arthur Hardy
- Place of birth: England
- Position: Forward

Senior career*
Years	Team	Apps	(Gls)
1891–1893	Derby County	3	(1)
- * Club domestic league appearances and goals

Arthur Hardy was an English footballer who played in the Football League for Derby County.
