= 1921 Tampa Bay hurricane =

Category 4 Atlantic hurricane in 1921

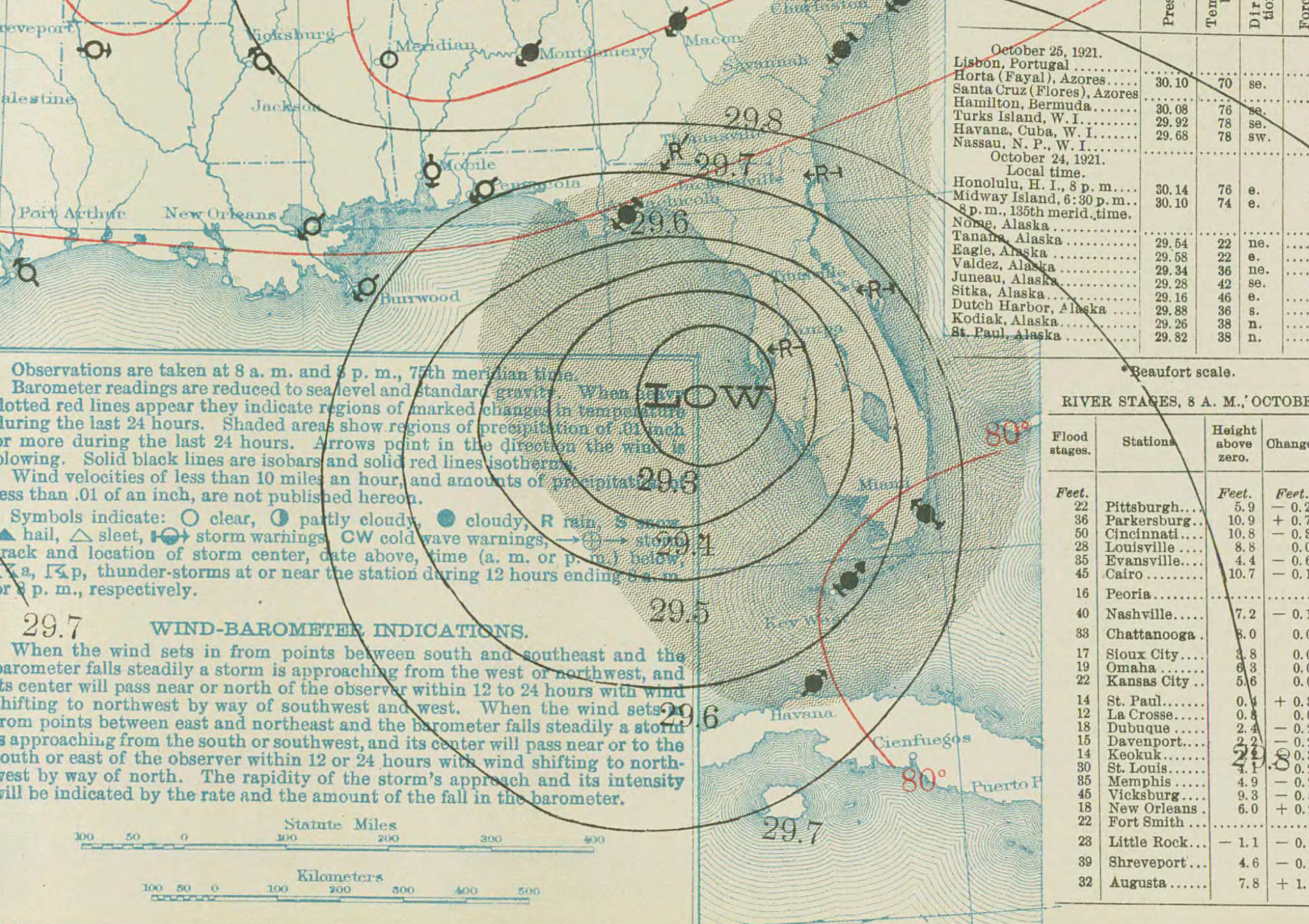
- Surface weather map of the hurricane making landfall near the Tampa Bay region of Florida on October 25

Meteorological history
- Formed: October 20, 1921
- Dissipated: October 30, 1921

Category 4 major hurricane
- 1-minute sustained (SSHWS/NWS)
- Highest winds: 140 mph (220 km/h)
- Lowest pressure: ≤941 mbar (hPa); ≤27.79 inHg

Overall effects
- Fatalities: 8 total
- Damage: $10 million (1921 USD)
- Areas affected: Western Caribbean, Cuba, Florida Keys, Florida Peninsula
- IBTrACS
- Part of the 1921 Atlantic hurricane season

The Tampa Bay hurricane of 1921 (also known as the 1921 Tarpon Springs hurricane) was a destructive and deadly major hurricane which made landfall in the Tampa Bay area of Florida in late October 1921, becoming the first to do so there since the hurricane of 1848. The eleventh tropical cyclone, sixth tropical storm, and fifth hurricane of the season, the storm developed from a trough in the southwestern Caribbean Sea on October 20. Initially a tropical storm, the system moved northwestward and intensified into a hurricane on October 22 and a major hurricane by October 23. Later that day, the hurricane peaked as a Category 4 on the modern day Saffir–Simpson scale with maximum sustained winds of 140 mph (230 km/h). After entering the Gulf of Mexico, the hurricane gradually curved northeastward and weakened to a Category 3 before making landfall near Tarpon Springs, Florida, late on October 25. The storm weakened to a Category 1 hurricane while crossing the Florida peninsula, and it reached the Atlantic Ocean early the following day. Thereafter, the system moved east-southeastward and remained fairly steady in intensity before weakening to a tropical storm late on October 29. The storm was then absorbed by a larger extratropical cyclone early the next day, with the remnants of the hurricane soon becoming indistinguishable.

The storm brought strong winds to the Swan Islands, including hurricane-force winds on the main island. Heavy rains fell in Cuba, particularly in Pinar del Río Province, but only minor damage occurred. In Florida, storm surge and abnormally high tides caused damage along much of the state's west coast from Pasco County southward. Several neighborhoods in Tampa were inundated, especially the interbay neighborhoods of Ballast Point, DeSoto Park, Edgewater Park, Hyde Park, Palmetto Beach, and other areas in the vicinity of Bayshore Boulevard. Strong winds also damaged hundreds of trees, signs, buildings, and homes. Four deaths occurred in Tampa, three from drownings and another after a man touched a live wire. The storm left two additional fatalities in St. Petersburg. A number of streets in Tarpon Springs were littered with masses of debris, with many structures and trees suffering extensive damage. Southward in Manatee County and Sarasota County, many waterfront communities along Sarasota Bay and the Gulf of Mexico, such as Cortez and Sarasota, suffered heavy structural losses. Strong winds occurred as far east as the Atlantic coast of the state, though wind damage east of the Tampa Bay area was generally limited to downed trees and power lines, resulting in power outages, particularly in Orlando. Agriculture throughout the state experienced significant impact as well, including over $2 million (equivalent to $30 million in 2024) in damage and the loss of at least 800,000 boxes of citrus crops alone. (Note: All damage figures are in 1921 United States dollars, unless otherwise noted) Overall, the hurricane left at least eight deaths and about $10 million (equivalent to $140 million in 2024) in damage.

== Meteorological history ==
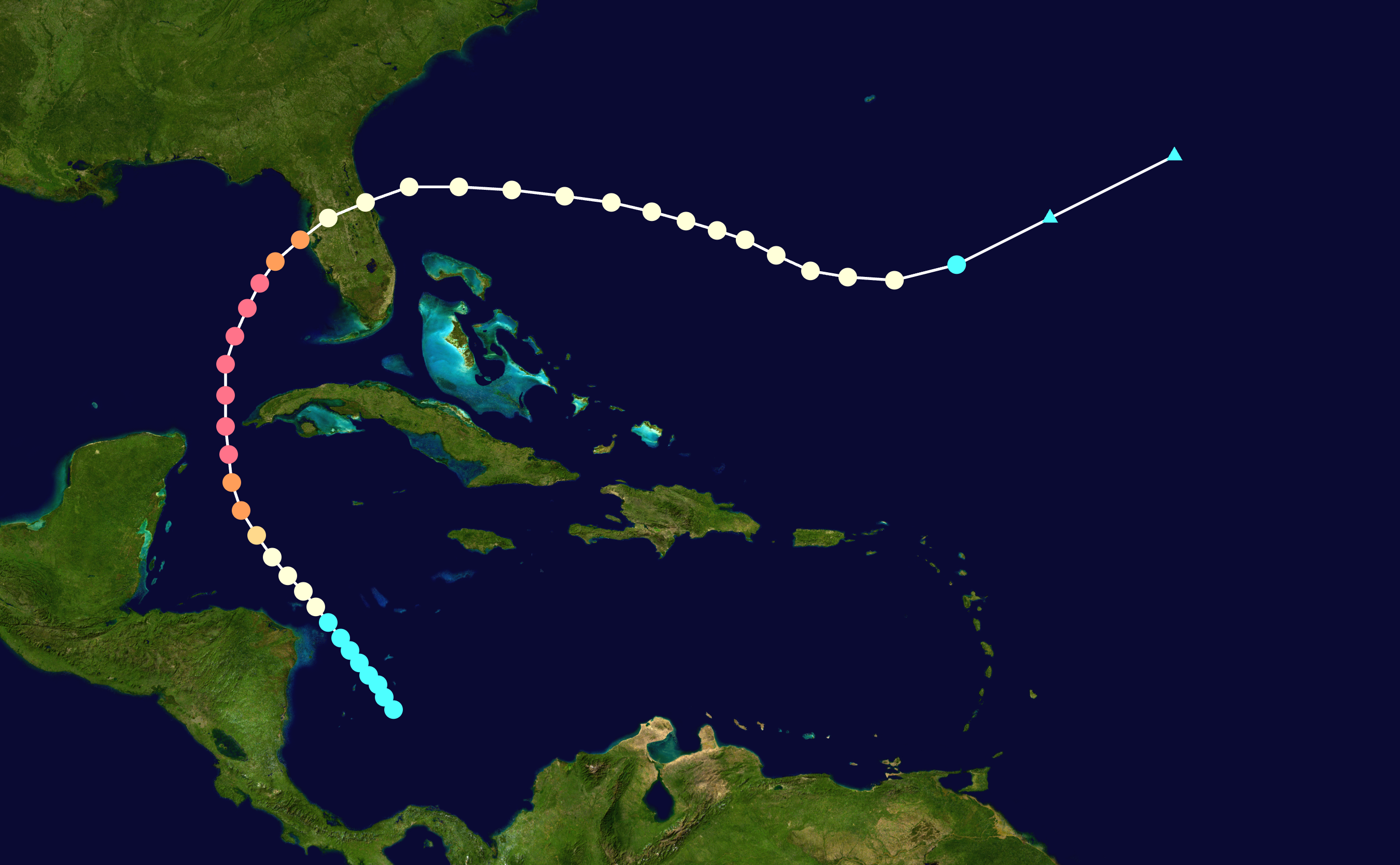
Map plotting the storm's track and intensity, according to the Saffir–Simpson scale Map key Saffir–Simpson scale Tropical depression (≤38 mph, ≤62 km/h) Tropical storm (39–73 mph, 63–118 km/h) Category 1 (74–95 mph, 119–153 km/h) Category 2 (96–110 mph, 154–177 km/h) Category 3 (111–129 mph, 178–208 km/h) Category 4 (130–156 mph, 209–251 km/h) Category 5 (≥157 mph, ≥252 km/h) Unknown Storm type Tropical cyclone Subtropical cyclone Extratropical cyclone, remnant low, tropical disturbance, or monsoon depression

In mid-October, a significant drop in atmospheric pressures over the western Caribbean Sea coincided with the development of a trough on October 17. Observations suggested that a circulation formed on October 20, with the Atlantic hurricane database listing a tropical storm beginning at 00:00 UTC, with the system was situated about 95 mi (153 km) southeast of the Archipelago of San Andrés, Providencia and Santa Catalina. The cyclone initially moved slowly northwestward due to a high pressure system over Bermuda. Early on October 22, the storm intensified into a Category 1 hurricane, based on sustained winds of 81 mph (130 km/h) on Great Swan Island. The hurricane strengthened significantly over the northwestern Caribbean, becoming a Category 2 hurricane at 00:00 UTC on October 23 and a Category 3 hurricane six hours later. Around 18:00 UTC, the cyclone reached Category 4 intensity and peaked with maximum sustained winds of 140 mph (230 km/h) and a minimum barometric pressure of 941 mbar (27.8 inHg). The latter was observed by the schooner Virginia, while the former was estimated using the southern wind-pressure relationship.

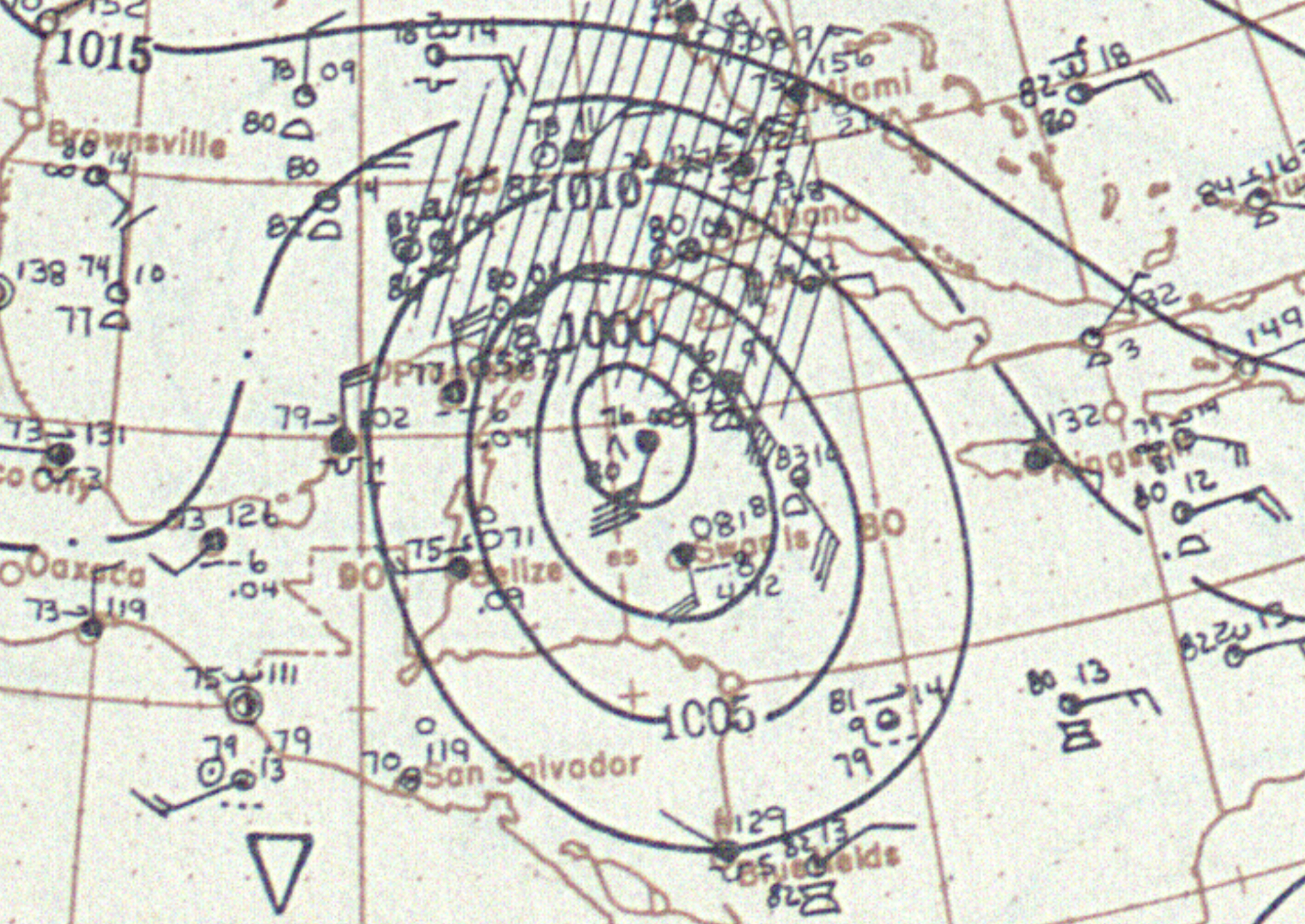
Surface weather analysis of the hurricane near peak intensity over the western Caribbean Sea on October 23

Early on October 24, the hurricane moved northward across the Yucatán Channel and entered the Gulf of Mexico. Thereafter, the system gradually curved to the northeast as the high pressure weakened and the storm became under the influence of a southwesterly air current. At 12:00 UTC on October 25, the cyclone weakened to a Category 3 hurricane. About 10 hours later, the hurricane made landfall near Tarpon Springs, Florida, with maximum sustained winds of 115 mph (185 km/h), making it the first and most recent major hurricane to hit the Tampa Bay area since 1848. The storm further weakened to a Category 1 hurricane over Central Florida early on October 26, then emerged into the Atlantic Ocean near New Smyrna Beach after about six hours over land. The hurricane briefly re-strengthened to reach winds of 90 mph (140 km/h) early on October 27 as it drifted to the east-southeast for about two days. Late on October 29, the system accelerated northeastward and weakened to a tropical storm, before being absorbed by a large extratropical cyclone about 430 mi (690 km) southeast of Bermuda at 00:00 UTC on October 30. About six hours later, the remnants of the hurricane became indistinguishable. These remnants were the second storm encountered by USS Olympia in its Atlantic crossing with the American unknown soldier from World War I.

== Preparations ==
Forecasters at the United States Weather Bureau issued advisories for ships and oceangoing vessels, while posting hurricane warnings for areas in western Florida stretching from Key West to Apalachicola on October 24 and October 25. Additionally, storm warnings were issued eastward from mouth of the Mississippi River and along the east coast of Florida.

== Impact ==
In Cuba, heavy rainfall in Pinar del Río Province caused rivers and creeks to rise. However, only minimal damage was reported.

The hurricane passed to the west of the Florida Keys as a Category 4 hurricane. Its large wind field caused tropical storm force winds to the islands, with the highest wind report being 48 mph (77 km/h) in Key West. Rainfall from the hurricane's outer bands was intermittent, and storm tides of 5 ft (1.5 m) were reported. Further north, Captiva and Sanibel islands were completely inundated with water. In Punta Rassa, the majority of homes were either extensively damaged or washed away. Most highways leading out of Fort Myers were impassible due to high water. Damage to railroad tracks resulted in a suspension of service for three days. On Estero Island, a number of buildings were damaged, including the casinos, cottages, and Crescent Beach resort. The storm also destroyed the mausoleum of Dr. Cyrus Teed, the founder of Koreshanity. Damage in Lee County reached about $1.5 million. Along the Myakka River near Boca Grande, the railroad bridge washed away, while the storm also destroyed two vehicular bridges over the Charlotte Harbor Bay. The streets of Punta Gorda were inundated, where a tide of 7 ft (2.1 m) above normal was recorded. One death occurred in the city due to drowning. At Egmont Key, above normal tides forced 75 people to seek shelter in the lighthouse. The entire island was inundated by water.

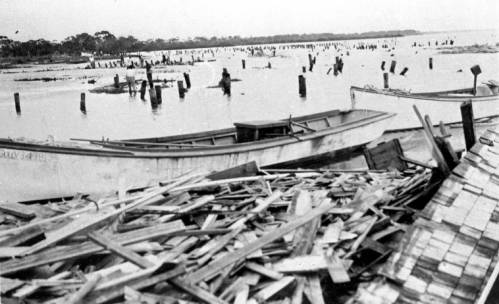
The docks and fish houses in Cortez after the hurricane

In Manatee County, the storm demolished much of the waterfront not only along Tampa Bay, but also Sarasota Bay and the Gulf of Mexico, On Passage Key, sustained winds of 75 mph (121 km/h) and a storm surge of 10.5 ft (3.2 m) were reported. During the storm, a cyclone-induced tidal wave was reported to have washed away the island's vegetation, which never rebounded. Southward on Anna Maria Island, the storm washed away high ground that was once a characteristic of the north end of the island. In the small fishing village of Cortez, the storm destroyed all of the community's fish houses and docks. The storm surge completely flooded the area up to 67th Street in Bradenton. Cortez's residents, with little forewarning of the storm, sought refuge in their rural graded schoolhouse, which withstood the storm while many houses floated away. Inland, the storm caused flooding along the Myakka River and the destruction of many wharfs along the Manatee River.

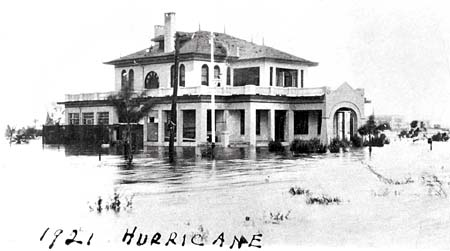
Flooding at the St. Petersburg Yacht Club

The hurricane brought a storm surge of 10–12 ft (3.0–3.7 m) to Tampa Bay. The highest rainfall total in Tampa was at 8.53 in (217 mm). However, the observer noted that winds probably blew water out of the gauge. The barometric pressure fell to 968 mbar (28.6 inHg), breaking a previous record set in 1910. The hurricane also brought sustained winds of 75 mph (121 km/h) and a storm tide of 10.5 ft (3.2 m). Damage from the wind was generally minor, while most of the impact wrought by the storm was due to abnormally high tides in Tampa and elsewhere in the area. Much of the city was flooded, with the worst along Bayshore Boulevard, where some of the most expensive properties were located. At Hyde Park, dwellings were inundated about halfway up the first story, prompting several people to be rescued by boat. Electrical poles and wires were washed away near the intersection of Bayshore Boulevard and Howard Avenue. The latter was also left impassible by car. In the Palmetto Beach neighborhood, much of the section was inundated. A group of about 40 volunteers rescued a number of women and children. A total of 50 homes were destroyed by cedar logs used to construct cigar boxes at the Tampa Box Company on 22nd Street.

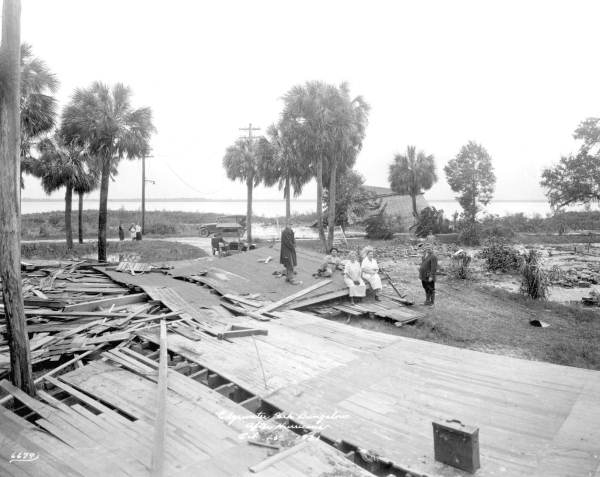
Edgewater Park bungalow, destroyed by the hurricane

At Ballast Point, the pavilion and bathhouse were destroyed by the storm. Nearby, the Tampa Yacht and Country Club suffered severe damage. Many cars along the waterfront were severely damaged and nearly all flat railroad cars were submerged. The Malloy Line dock was also left under several feet of water. A number of waterfront warehouses were also damaged by floodwaters. After the Tampa Electrical Company power house experienced water damage, the electricity was shut off. Additionally, the company's cable station was flooded under several feet of water. Winds downed hundreds of trees and sign across roadways and tore-up awnings. At least 50 awnings were ripped from a bank building on Franklin Street alone. Falling trees also damaged the post office and the YMCA. Almost 500 dwellings in the neighborhood of Ybor City were demolished. Five people were killed in the city, three from people coming into contact with a live wire and the other two from drowning. Only minor damage occurred in Plant City. Throughout Hillsborough County, many county roads were impassable due to downed telegraph poles and other debris, especially between Tampa and Plant City.

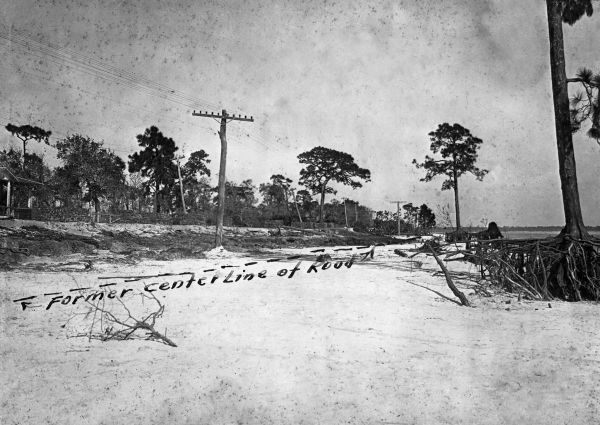
A road washed out in Pinellas County

Tides 5–6 ft (1.5–1.8 m) above normal and storm surge in St. Petersburg damaged or destroyed all four fishing piers. Many ships and boats of all sizes capsized or were beached, including the trawler Hypnotist, which ejected the crew of seven into the water, all of whom were rescued. The St. Petersburg Beach Hotel was destroyed, after employees swam through the lobby for safety. At the office of the St. Petersburg Times, then located at Fifth Street and First Avenue South, the loss of electricity resulted in staff working overnight with lanterns. With no power to operate the typesetting machine, the employees connected their linotype machine to a two-cylinder motorcycle to publish the "Motorcycle Extra". Two deaths occurred in St. Petersburg, one from a heart attack during preparations for the storm and the other from a man being crushed by a falling roof.

Initially, there were rumors and unconfirmed reports that Pass-a-Grille (today a neighborhood of St. Pete Beach) was wiped out and that up to 150 deaths occurred. Though the town was hit particularly hard, there were no fatalities and damage was less severe than indicated, reaching about $50,000. Storm surge was partially diverted to Boca Ciega Bay, but Pass-a-Grille generally suffered severe impact due to 5 to 7 ft (1.5 to 2.1 m) of water covering some areas. The island's luxury resort hotel was extensively damaged, and its dancing pavilion was destroyed. It never reopened and was destroyed by fire the following year. A number of cottages were badly damaged. The storm destroyed a casino in Gulfport. The casino in Indian Rocks Beach collapsed after the sand foundation was washed away. In Largo, nearly all of the buildings at the Pinellas County Fairgrounds were rendered unusable.

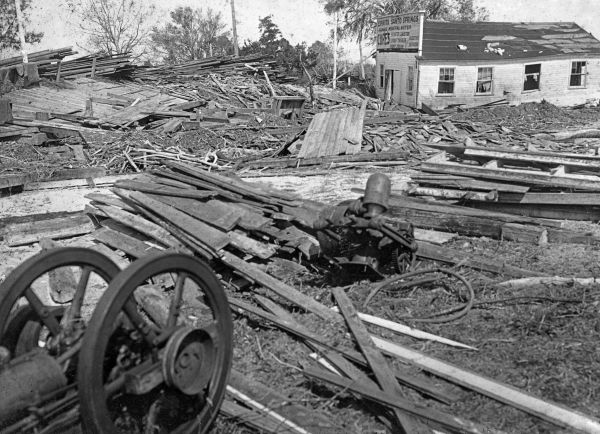
Damage to the pavilion in Safety Harbor

Buildings were severely damaged in Clearwater, including the ice and power plants, a theater, and a hotel. Many residences were also damaged. Electric and telephone wires were downed, leaving the city without power or telephone service. Boats were tossed about in the bay. The city of Oldsmar was devastated by storm surge, with portions of the town being inundated by 6 ft (1.8 m) of water. Many homes were practically demolished. Although no loss of human life occurred, many cattle drowned. The storm cut Hog Island in two, forming present-day Honeymoon and Caladesi islands, both separated by Hurricane Pass. Myrtle Scharrer Betz, who along with her father and husband were the only permanent residents of the island at the time, was present at the family's homestead during the hurricane and was among the first to view the newly created channel.

In Tarpon Springs, streets were littered with masses of debris. Sections of the city along the Anclote River were flooded. Primarily, impact consisted of structures being unroofed, windows shattering, and tree being uprooted. Throughout the city, electrical and telephone lines were downed, but telephone was partially maintained and electricity was restored quickly. Two hotels suffered extensive damage due to flooding. Although the high school was also severely damaged, classrooms remained usable. The cupola was torn away and the roof was partially damaged, including over the auditorium. The Odd Fellows Hall was thrown off its foundation and virtually destroyed. In the business district, most of the buildings leaked, resulting in damage to merchandise. Crop damage in Pinellas County was extensive, totaling about $1 million, which included a loss of 50%–70% of fruit lost and considerable damage to citrus trees.

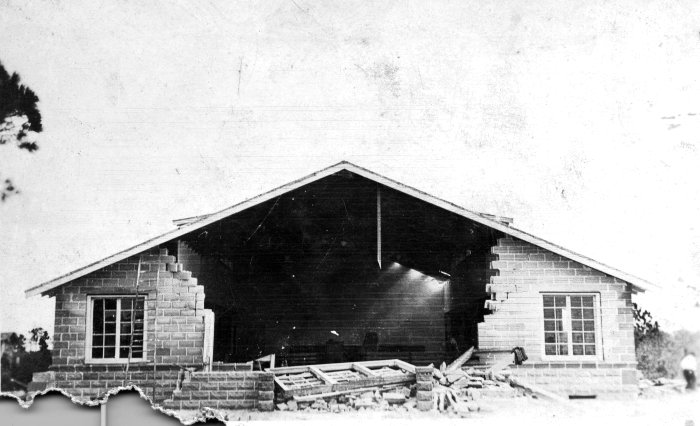
Damage to a church under construction in New Port Richey

The hurricane also brought extensive impact to portions of Pasco County. In New Port Richey, a few churches suffered severe damage or were destroyed. Nearly all walls collapsed and many windows were shattered at the school house. Only one shop remained standing at a plaza with several industrial stores. The vast majority of homes in the city received some degree of damage. Local crops experienced extensive impact, with a local farm losing about 800 boxes worth of fruit. Similar effects occurred in Port Richey. All stores received water damage, while two homes were destroyed and several others were inflicted with varying degrees of impact.

In Dade City, Mt. Zion Baptist Church was demolished, which was never rebuilt. Only the church cemetery remains. Another church, which opened early in the year, was nearly demolished by falling trees. A turpentine plant was damaged, including the loss of about one-third of the lumber stored in the building. The Sunnybrook Tobacco Company suffered significant impact, with nine large barns destroyed and about 110 acres (45 ha) of trees toppled. A number of other companies sustained damage, including the Dade City Packing Company and the Dade City Ice, Light and Power Company. Damage to the business reached $100,000. Several homes were damaged. Electrical, telegraph, and telephone wires were downed throughout the city. During the storm, electricity was maintained in the downtown section, while residential areas were left without power for two days. In San Antonio and Trilby, a number of buildings were moved off their foundations. The old city hall in Zephyrhills was moved about 4 ft (1.2 m). At a hotel, the building lost a portion of its roof and several windows were broken. In addition, the hurricane virtually destroyed much of Passage Key, part of which was later rebuilt.

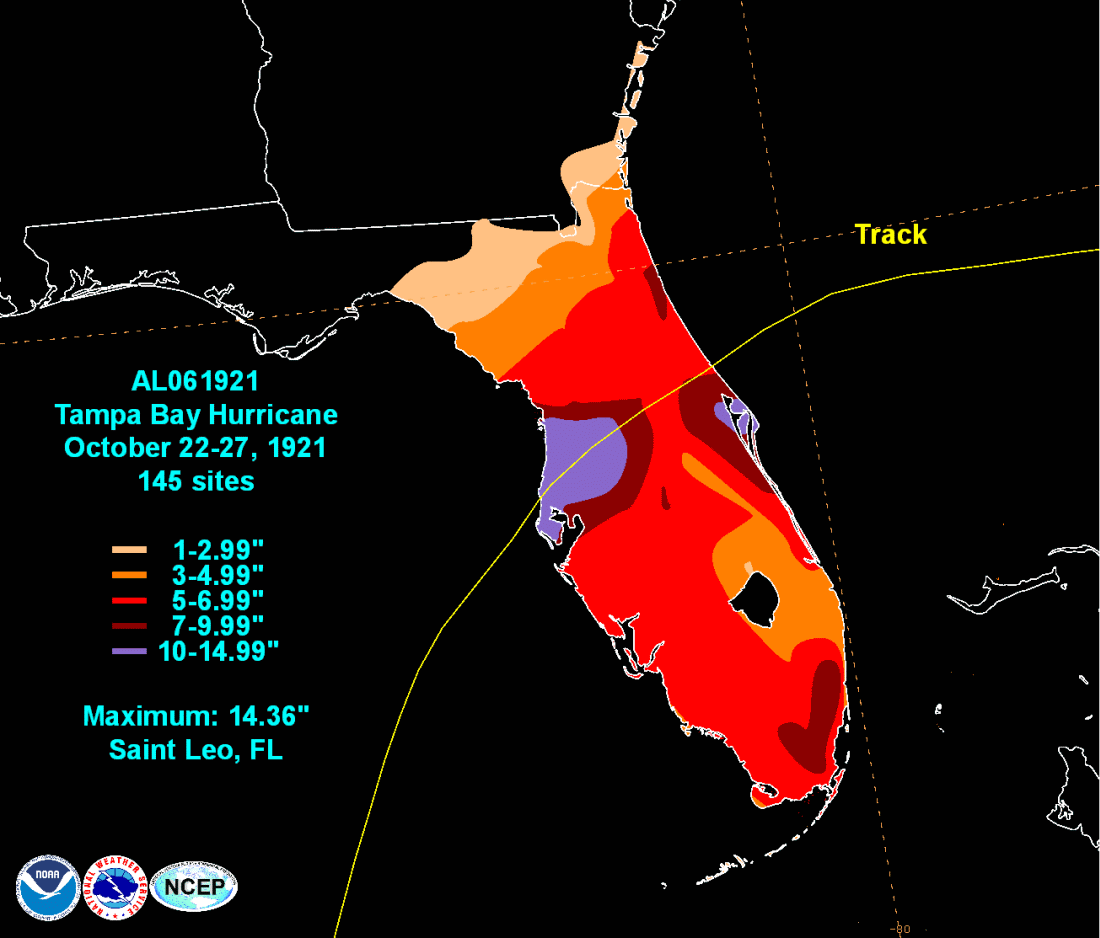
Map of the total rainfall from the hurricane

In Polk County, the storm left light property damage in Lakeland, reaching under $5,000, which included the school building being deroofed. Damage to crops was mostly limited to grapefruit and oranges, with losses estimated to have been less than 10%. In the rural communities outside Lakeland, several small building suffered damage. This was considered the worst tropical cyclone in the area since 1897. Lake County experienced sustained winds of 70 mph (110 km/h) and 12 to 15 in (300 to 380 mm) of rain in some areas. Much of the impact was confined to large trees being uprooted and ornamental vines suffering damage. A number of trees fell on electrical wires, causing power outages and disruptions to telephone service. Additionally, it is possible that a tornado touched down, based on some pine trees being "splintered from top to bottom and curled up like molasses candy." Damage to citrus crops was light, with losses conservatively estimated at less than 5%. Strong winds in Orange County left the entire city of Orlando without electricity, disrupting commerce. Citrus crops suffered no more than 5% in losses in the county. In St. Augustine, wind downed wires, some of which caused small fires in the business district. A steamship capsized sailing from Jacksonville to Miami capsized offshore Jupiter and there were reports of damage to several other small boats offshore. Agricultural damage from the hurricane was high, reaching over $2 million, with more than $1 million incurred to crops and the remainder to fertilizer and other materials. Citrus crops were especially hard hit, with 800,000 to 1,000,000 boxes of fruit lost. Salt water, caused by coastal flooding, prevented cultivation of soil in some areas, though rainfall eventually washed away the salt. In all, the hurricane left at least eight people dead and about $10 million in damage.

== Aftermath ==
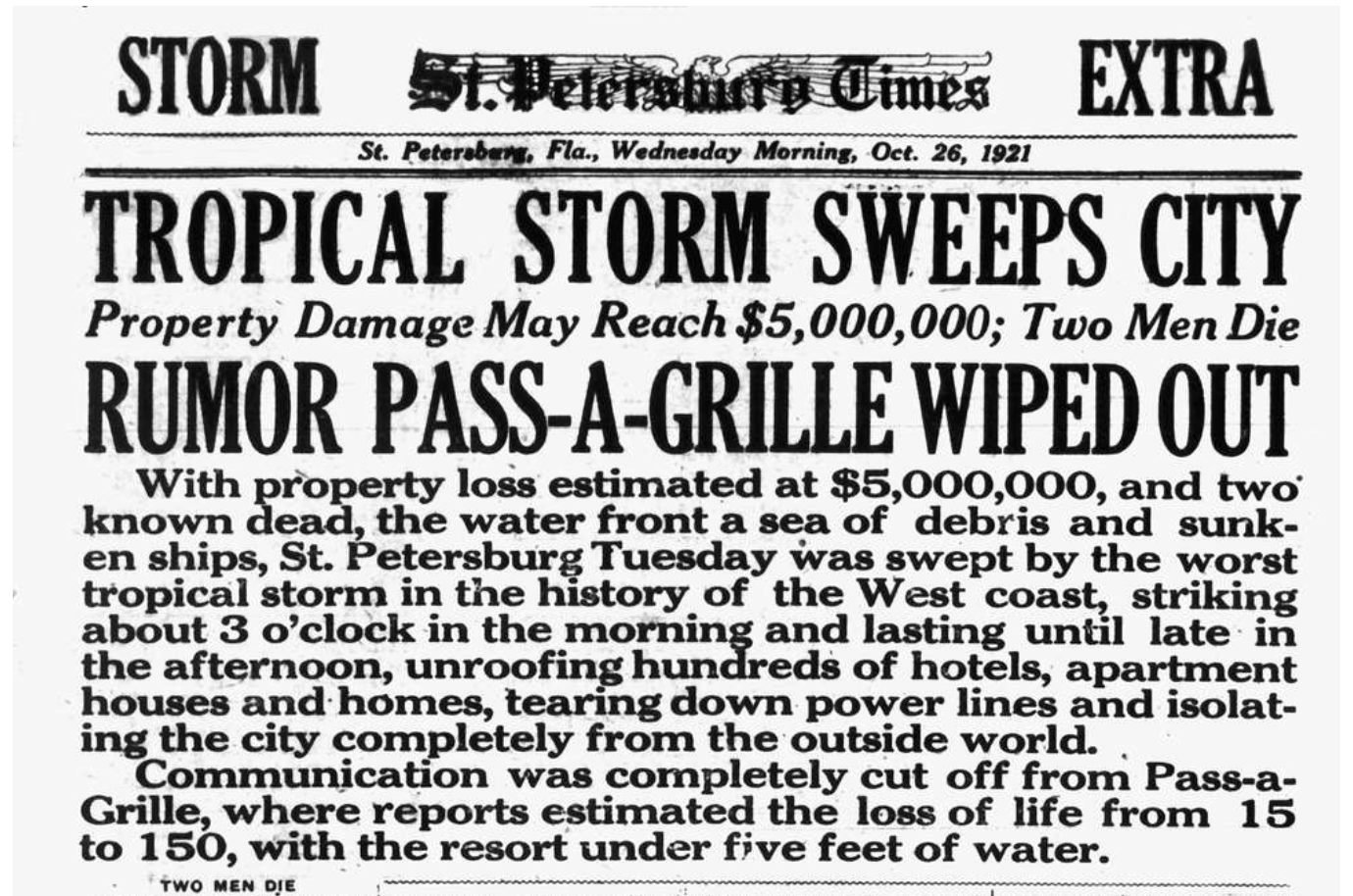
St. Petersburg Times headline reporting Pass-a-Grille devastation

After receiving reports of mass casualties and destruction at Pass-a-Grille, the American Red Cross stocked a United States Navy subchaser with pine caskets and relief supplies, but found no bodies and only a fraction of the reported damage. Because of fears that the hurricane might hinder the Florida land boom of the 1920s, rebuilding and cleanup of the area commenced quickly and the land boom in the Tampa Bay region and in southern Florida continued. Local officials, businessmen, realtors, and later the press soon attempted to cover up or downplay the damage, which threatened to distort Tampa's advertised image as the "Year Round City". On October 28, a writer for The Tampa Tribune stated, "Everyone is accepting the storm as an incident and all are going to work to rebuild the devastated areas, with the firm conviction that there will not be another storm of such severity during the life of anyone now living." One of the destroyed buildings at the Ballist Point Pavilion was soon rebuilt after the storm. However, the building was destroyed again by fire in 1922. In 1925, a new pavilion was built. On Captiva Island, the Wayside Chapel suffered extensive damage, but was repaired and reopened as Captiva School and Chapel-by-the-Sea, which has been listed as a National Historic Place since 2013. Many farmers on the island sold their land for a significantly reduced price to Clarence B. Chadwick, who would transform more than 330 acres (130 ha) of property into the South Seas Island Resort.

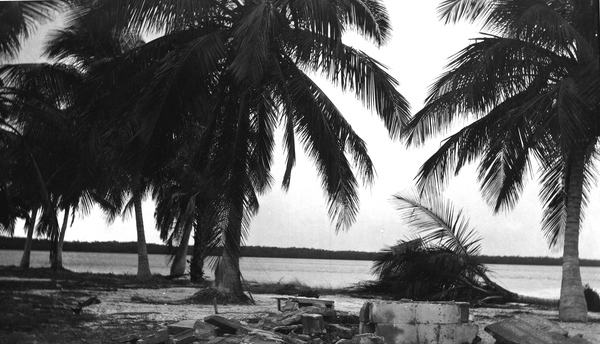
Remains of Dr. Teed's mausoleum at Ft. Myers Beach on Estero Island after the hurricane

The hurricane was the first major hurricane to strike the Tampa Bay region since a hurricane in 1848 and remains the most recent. Hurricane Milton in 2024 came close, striking south of Tampa Bay in Siesta Key. The 1946 Florida hurricane, which struck 25 years after the 1921 hurricane, remains the most recent hurricane to directly cross Tampa. In the past few decades, local officials have been concerned about a major hurricane impacting the area due to population increases, older building codes, storm surge projections, and complacency among some residents. The combined population of Citrus, Hernando, Hillsborough, Pasco, and Pinellas counties has increased from about 135,000 people in 1921 to approximately 3.3 million by 2020. In Pasco County, more than half of the homes were constructed prior to the enactment of stronger building codes in the aftermath of Hurricane Andrew. A Sea, Lake, and Overland Surge from Hurricanes (SLOSH) computer model from the National Oceanic and Atmospheric Administration (NOAA) indicates that portions of Downtown Tampa would be flooded with over 20 ft (6.1 m) of water in the event of a Category 4 hurricane, while St. Petersburg would be surrounded by water. CoreLogic, an international property information firm, estimated in 2016 that nearly 455,000 homes were at risk of being damaged by storm surge, with costs of property damage and repairs reaching approximately $80.6 billion (2016 USD). Another property firm, Karen Clark & Co., estimated in 2015 that storm surge could inflict as much as $175 billion (2015 USD) in damage in a worst-case scenario.

== See also ==
- List of Florida hurricanes (1900–1949)
- 1946 Florida hurricane – Another hurricane which directly impacted the Tampa Bay area 25 years later
- Hurricane Zeta (2020) – Latest major hurricane to strike the continental United States in the calendar year on record
- Hurricane Ian (2022)
- Hurricane Milton (2024) – Damaging hurricane which struck the Tampa Bay area at a similar intensity.
