= Hardee (surname) =

Hardee is a surname. Notable people with the surname include:

- Billy Hardee (1954-2011), American football player
- Cary A. Hardee (1876-1957), American governor of Florida
- Gardner S. Hardee (1842–1926), Florida settler and state senator
- John Hais Hardee Sr. (1747-1809), American officer of Continental Army
- John Hardee (1918-1984), American tenor saxophonist
- Judith Hardee (born 1955), American wrestler
- Justin Hardee (born 1994), American football player
- Kevin Hardee (born 1965), American politique in South Carolina
- Lucius Augustus Hardee (1828-1885), Americain officer
- Malcolm Hardee (1950–2005), British comedian and writer
- Robert A. Hardee (1833-1909), American politician in Florida
- Rodney Hardee (born 1954), American folklorist artist
- Trey Hardee (born 1984), American decathlete
- Wilber Hardee (1918-2008), founder of Hardee's
- William J. Hardee (1815–1873), United States Army officer

== See also ==
- Hardee Kirkland (1868–1929), American silent film actor and director
- Hardee T. Lineham, Canadian actor
- Hardy (surname)
- Hardie, surname
