= Jacksonville Light Infantry =

Military Unit

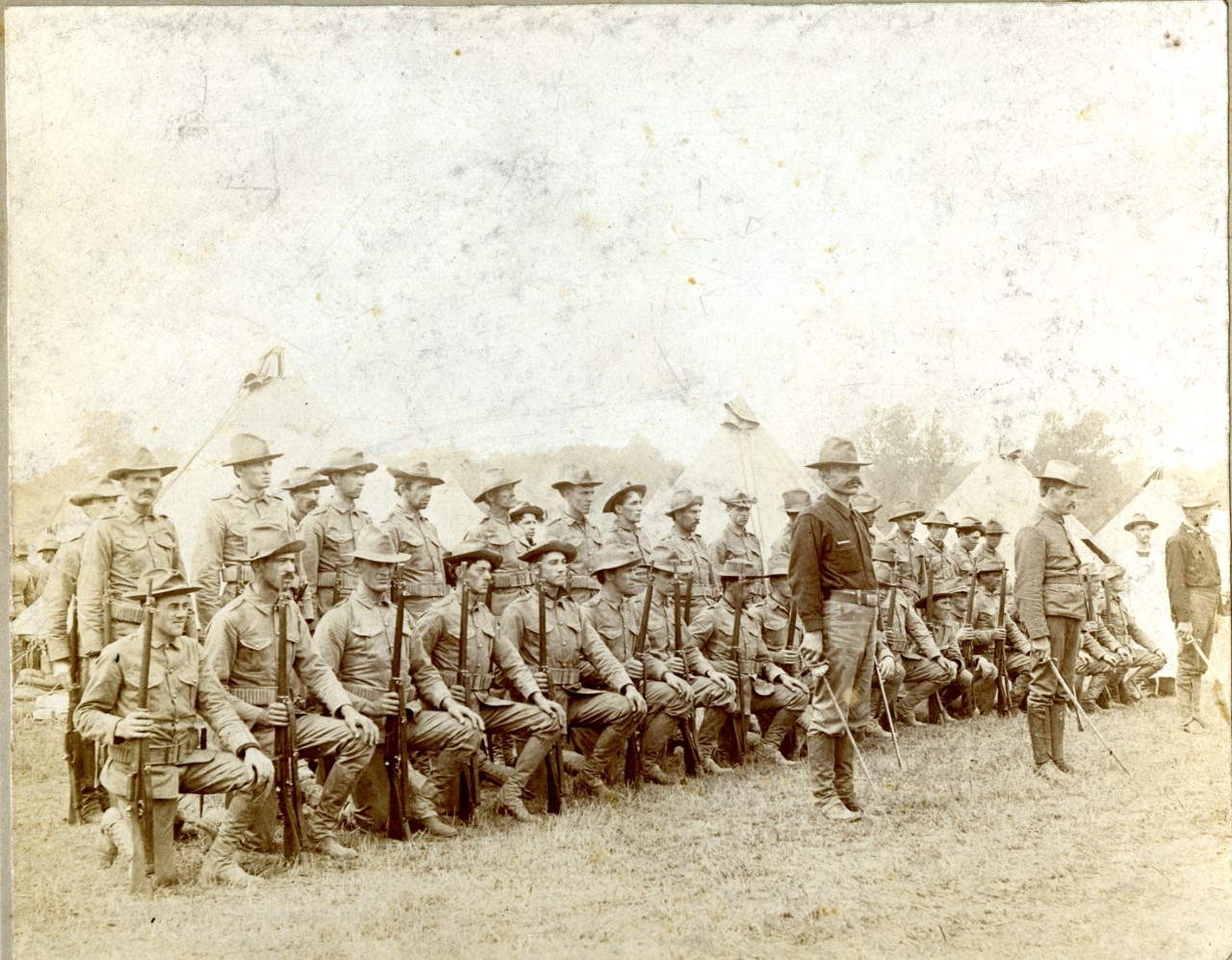
Photograph of the Jacksonville Light Infantry circa 1890s. Courtesy of the Jacksonville Historical Society

The Jacksonville Light Infantry were a militia unit organized on April 30 of 1859 in Jacksonville, Florida. The unit fought for the Confederacy during the American Civil War as well as with the U.S. Army during the Spanish–American War and World War I.

== American Civil War ==
When the company was first organized in 1859, there were 41 men on the roster; 13 commissioned and noncommissioned officers and 28 privates. Following Florida's secession, the Jacksonville Light Infantry was the first company to be accepted into service by the state. The company was led by Holmes Steele, one of Jacksonville's first physicians as well as the city mayor in 1859 and an editor of one of the town's newspapers, the Jacksonville Standard. Among the unit's ranks, according to one historian, were many of the town's wealthiest and most successful businessmen as well as the sons of some of the most prominent families in Jacksonville.

To start, the unit served as a garrison force at a battery at the mouth of the St. John's River. Once the 3rd Florida Infantry Regiment was formed, the Jacksonville Light Infantry was mustered in as Company A of the regiment on August 10, 1861.

The women of Jacksonville gifted the company a silk battle flag bearing the slogan "Let us Alone" in 1860 and a Confederate flag the following year. Their uniform consisted of a blue coat with "three rows of brass buttons in the front, and high caps with black pompons," as well as either white pants, in warm weather, or else blue cloth pants.

== Spanish American War ==
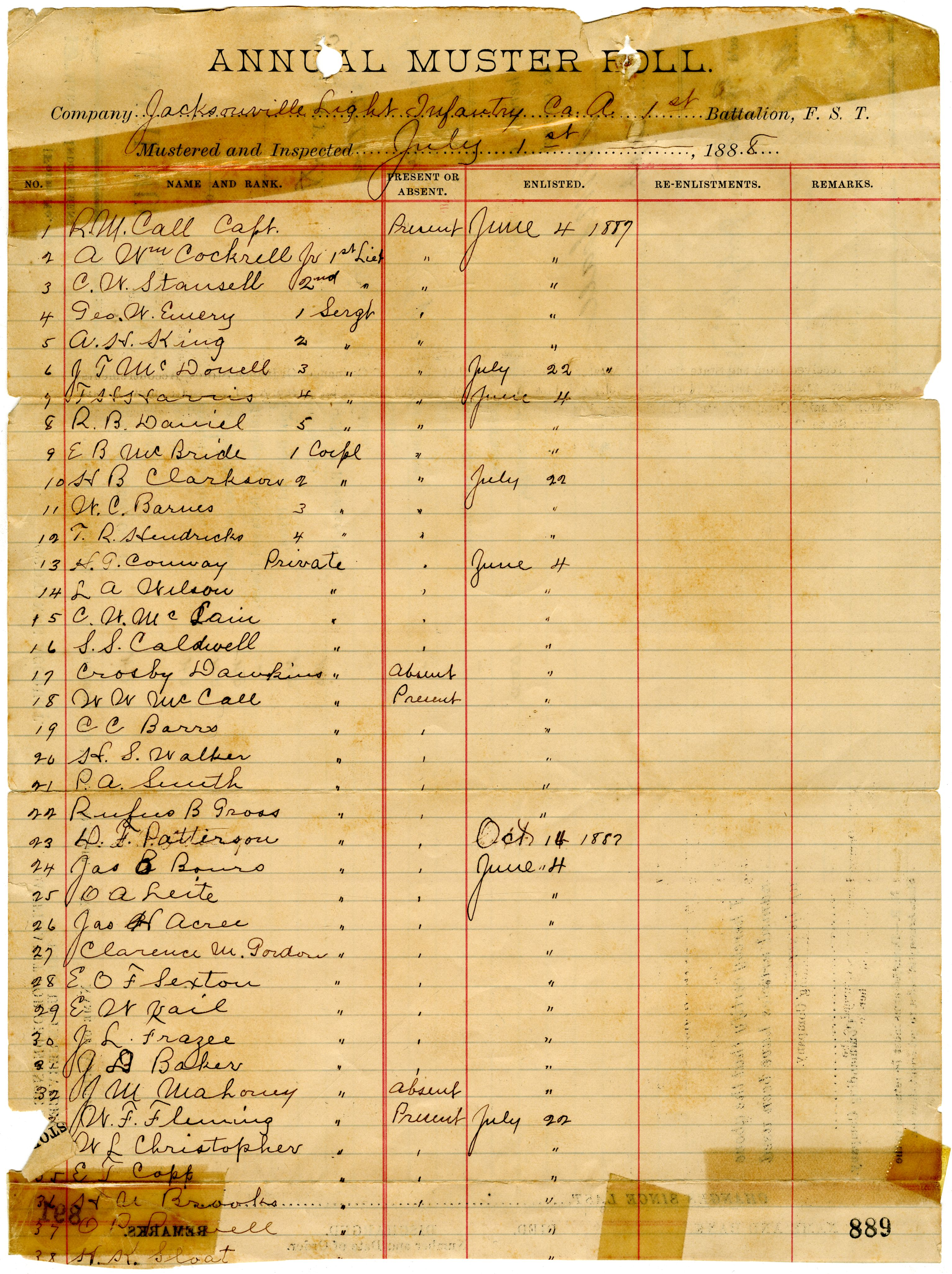
Company A, First Separate Battalion, Florida State Troops (Jacksonville Light Infantry) - Muster Roll, 1888

Even before the official outbreak of the Spanish American War, Floridians were enthusiastic and started to recruit, drill, and parade, including members of the Jacksonville Light Infantry. During this deployment, the unit was commanded by Captain John Maxwell.

On May 23, 1898, Governor Bloxham announced that 12 companies in Florida would form to create the First Florida Volunteer Infantry. The Jacksonville Light Infantry were among these dozen companies. Following the formation of the First Florida, the men were sent from the camp at Fort Brooke to a new camp at nearby Palmetto Beach. From May through the summer of 1898, the unit was deployed to different camps throughout the state until they ended up at a camp in Huntsville, Alabama. It was in Huntsville where the Jacksonville Light Infantry company suffered their only casualty, a man named Frank E. Willard. No cause of death is listed. Throughout the spring and summer of 1898, the men of the First Florida Volunteer Infantry complained about the state of their lodgings as well as the fact that they weren't being deployed to Cuba to fight. Their complaints, at least about deployment, would end up being valid as the unit was never dispatched overseas. Hostilities ended on August 12, 1898, and the Treaty of Paris was formally signed on December 10 of the same year.

== After the Spanish American War ==
The unit offered their services through Governor Bloxham to go to China to fight in the Boxer Rebellion in the summer of 1900. While the unit was not deployed, several U.S. marine units were sent over to fight against the anti-European Chinese "Boxers."

In June 2020, a statue honoring the unit was removed from James Weldon Johnson Park in downtown Jacksonville amid the George Floyd protests. The statue had been erected in 1898 and had been one of the few things that had survived the Great Fire of 1901.
