= Hardie =

Hardie is a surname. Notable people with the surname include:

- Albert Hardie, Jr. (born 1987), American professional wrestler
- Andrew Hardie, Baron Hardie (born 1946), British lawyer and politician
- Andrew Hardie (radical)
- Brad Hardie (born 1962), former Australian rules footballer
- Gabrielle Hardie (born 2009), American gymnast
- George Hardie (disambiguation), multiple people
- Grant Hardie (born 1992), Scottish curler
- James Allen Hardie (1823-76), American soldier
- John Hardie (rugby union) (born 1988), New Zealand rugby player
- Jakub Hardie-Douglas (born 1982), Polish politician
- John Hardie (footballer) (born 1938), Scottish footballer
- Jerzy Hardie-Douglas (born 1951), Polish politician
- Keir Hardie (1856-1915), British politician
- Martin Hardie (footballer), Scottish footballer
- Michael Hardie Boys (1931–2023), New Zealand judge and governor-general
- Neil Hardie, English curler
- Philip Hardie, professor of Latin literature
- R. A. Hardie, Canadian physician and missionary to Korea
- Robert Gordon Hardie (1854–1904), American painter
- Ryan Hardie (born 1997), Scottish footballer
- Norman Hardie (1924 - 2017), New Zealand mountaineer

== See also ==
- James Hardie, multinational company founded in Australia
- Hardy (surname)
- Hardee (surname)
