= 1921 Atlantic hurricane season =

- Season summary map

Seasonal boundaries
- First system formed: June 1, 1921
- Last system dissipated: November 25, 1921

Strongest storm
- Name: Six
  - Maximum winds: 140 mph (220 km/h) (1-minute sustained)
  - Lowest pressure: 941 mbar (hPa; 27.79 inHg)

Seasonal statistics
- Total depressions: 12
- Total storms: 7
- Hurricanes: 5
- Major hurricanes (Cat. 3+): 2
- Total fatalities: 306
- Total damage: $3 million (1921 USD)

Related articles
- 1920–24 Pacific hurricane seasons; 1920–1937 Pacific typhoon seasons; 1920s North Indian Ocean cyclone seasons

The 1921 Atlantic hurricane season was an active hurricane season, with 12 tropical cyclones forming. Among them, seven became tropical storms, of which five strengthened into hurricanes. Furthermore, two of these strengthened into a major hurricane, Category 3 or higher on the modern-day Saffir–Simpson hurricane wind scale, the most since the 1917 season. The first system, a tropical depression, developed on June 1, while the last, a tropical storm, dissipated on November 25. Of note, three tropical cyclones co-existed with another during the season.

The strongest hurricane of the season, Hurricane Six, peaked as a low-end Category 4 with winds of 140 mph (225 km/h), before weakening as it approached the Tampa Bay area where it made landfall. Across Florida, it left about $10 million (1921 USD) in damage and eight deaths. Two other cyclones left extensive impacts. Although not a tropical cyclone at the time, the remnants of the second hurricane contributed to a devastating flood in the Greater San Antonio area of Texas, which resulted in $19 million in damage and 215 fatalities. The third hurricane left thousands homeless in the Lesser Antilles and caused at least 81 deaths.

The season's activity was reflected with an accumulated cyclone energy (ACE) rating of 87, above the 1921–1930 average of 76.6. ACE is a metric used to express the energy used by a tropical cyclone during its lifetime. Therefore, a storm with a longer duration will have high values of ACE. It is only calculated at six-hour increments in which specific tropical and subtropical systems are either at or above sustained wind speeds of 39 mph (63 km/h), which is the threshold for tropical storm intensity. Thus, tropical depressions are not included here.

== Systems ==
=== Hurricane One ===
- Category 1 hurricane (SSHWS)
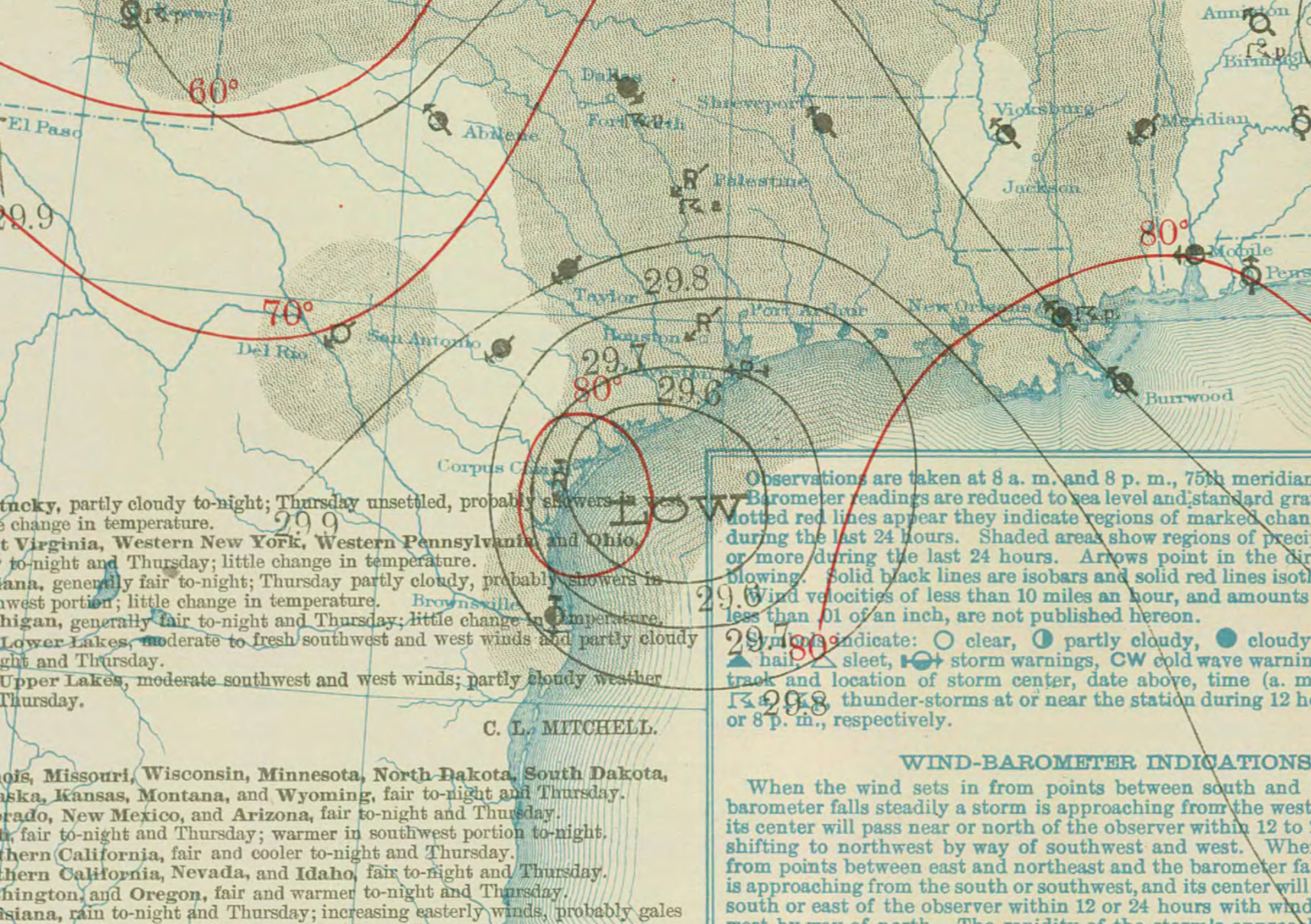
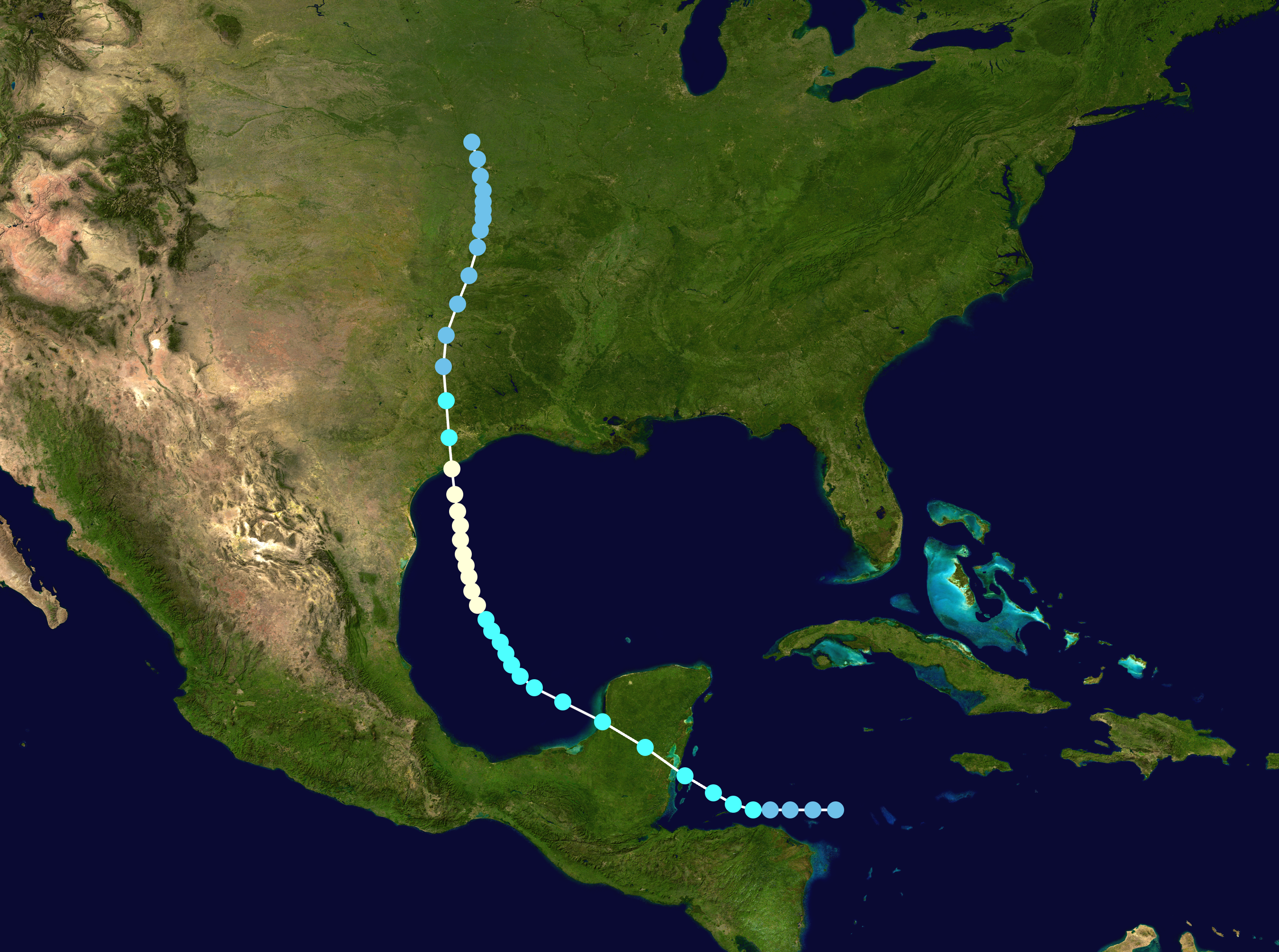
- Duration: June 16 – June 26
- Peak intensity: 90 mph (150 km/h) (1-min); 980 mbar (hPa)

A westward-moving disturbance developed into a tropical depression over the western Caribbean Sea on June 16. About 24 hours later, the depression intensified into a tropical storm. Late on June 17, the storm made landfall in northern Belize with winds of 50 mph (80 km/h). The cyclone moved northwestward and weakened slightly while crossing the Yucatán Peninsula, but remained a tropical storm. Early on June 18, the system emerged into the Gulf of Mexico and began to curve north-northwestward. Continuing to intensify, it attained hurricane status around 12:00 UTC on June 20. The hurricane drifted and strengthened further. Early on June 22, sustained winds associated with the storm peaked at 90 mph (140 km/h). At approximately 18:00 UTC, the cyclone made landfall near Matagorda, Texas, at the same intensity. A ship offshore observed a barometric pressure of 980 mbar (29 inHg), which would be the lowest in relation to the storm. The hurricane quickly fell to tropical storm intensity, and then weakened to a tropical depression around 12:00 UTC on June 23. However, the depression persisted for a few more days, until dissipating over northern Missouri on June 26.

In Mexico, a weather station at Progreso in Yucatán observed winds of 52 mph (84 km/h). Along the coast of Texas near Matagorda Bay, tides reached approximately 5 ft (1.5 m) above mean low tide, while tides crested exceeded 7 ft (2.1 m) in some parts of West Bay. A storm surge of 7.1 feet (2.2 m) was measured at Pass Cavallo. Rough seas caused a barge with 18,000 US gal (68,000 L; 15,000 imp gal) of oil to capsize at Port Aransas. Washouts occurred along the Gulf, Colorado and Santa Fe Railway between Highland Bayou and Virginia Point. Abnormally high tides also sunk several launches and a number of small boats and damaged many fishing piers. Parts of Texas observed high winds, with Corpus Christi reporting a sustained wind speed of 68 mph (109 km/h). Winds damaged crops to some extent, shattered windows, toppled signs, and downed some trees. Rainfall totals in Austwell, Columbus, Edna, Hempstead, Matagorda, Navasota, Pierce, Rosenberg, and Sealy all set records for the most precipitation for any day in the month of June in their respective towns. One death occurred in Longview when a man was struck by lightning, with the same bolt also killing two calves and a cow.

=== Hurricane Two ===
- Category 1 hurricane (SSHWS)
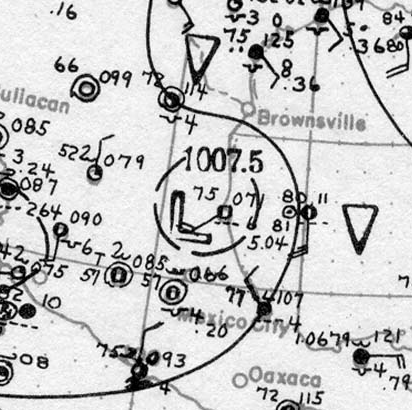
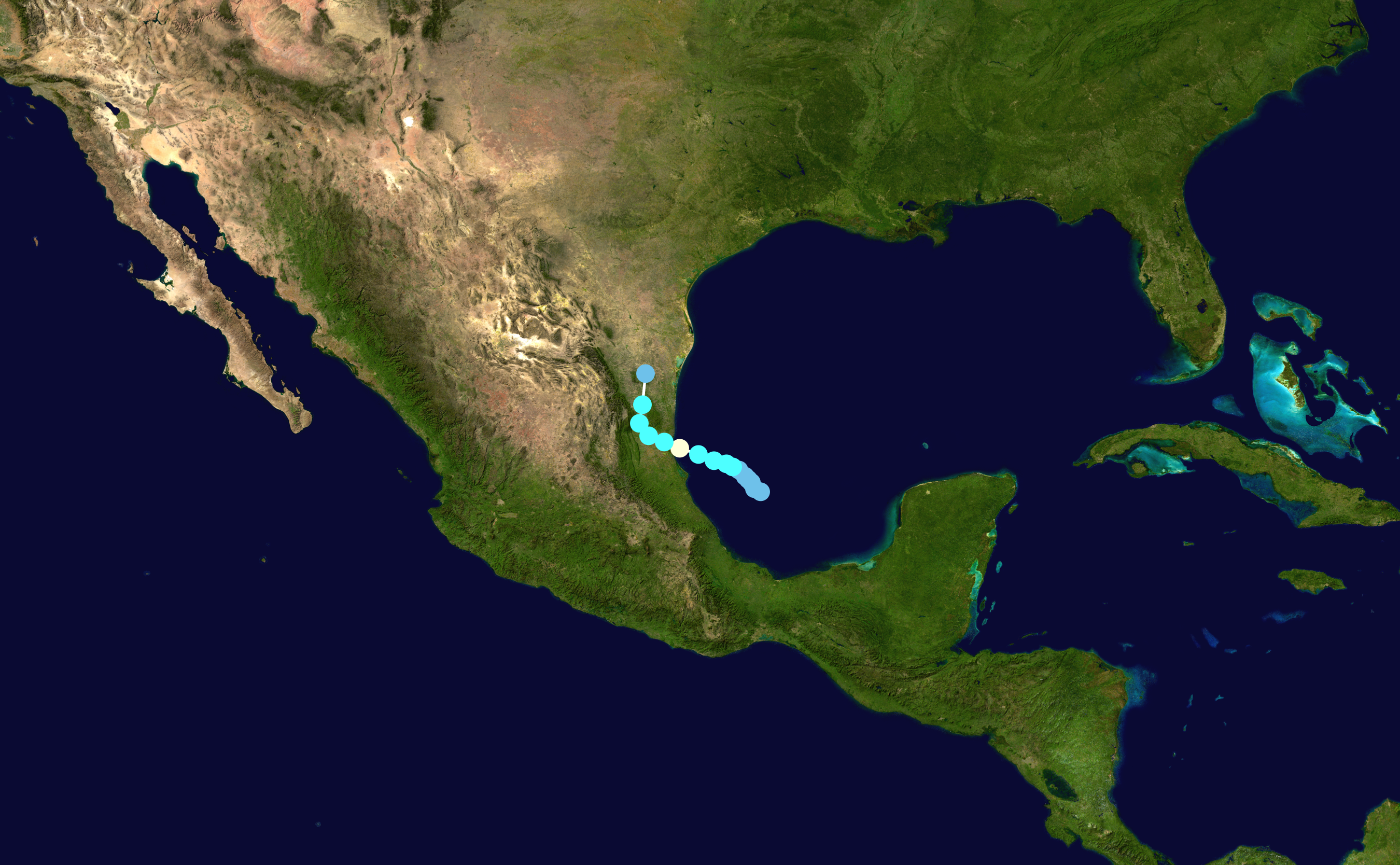
- Duration: September 4 – September 8
- Peak intensity: 80 mph (130 km/h) (1-min); 985 mbar (hPa)

An area of disturbed weather developed into a tropical depression over the Bay of Campeche on September 4. The depression moved slowly northwestward and reached tropical storm intensity by 00:00 UTC on September 6. The storm then curved west-northwestward and reached hurricane intensity about twenty four hours. Around that time, the system peaked with maximum sustained winds of 80 mph (130 km/h) and an estimated minimum barometric pressure of 985 mbar (29.1 inHg). At 03:00 UTC on September 7, the hurricane made landfall in Mexico just north of Tampico, Tamaulipas. After moving inland, the storm weakened and dissipated early on September 8.

After the cyclone dissipated on September 8, an extremely heavy rainfall event ensued across central Texas, which continued into September 11. In Williamson County, a new 18-hour rainfall record was set for the United States as 36.40 in (925 mm) was recorded at Thrall; the storm total rainfall there was 39.71 in (1,009 mm). The deluge led to one of the most destructive floods in the history of San Antonio. Water rose to 7 ft (2.1 m) deep in the city, forcing people to evacuate vertically within taller buildings. The most significant river floods occurred along the Little and San Gabriel rivers, where 159 people perished. Combined with the death toll from elsewhere across the region, 215 people died due to this storm and damages were estimated at $19 million.

=== Hurricane Three ===
- Category 3 hurricane (SSHWS)
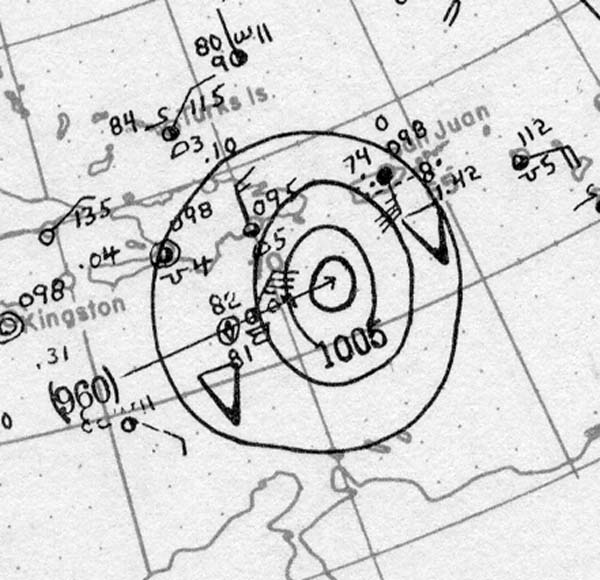
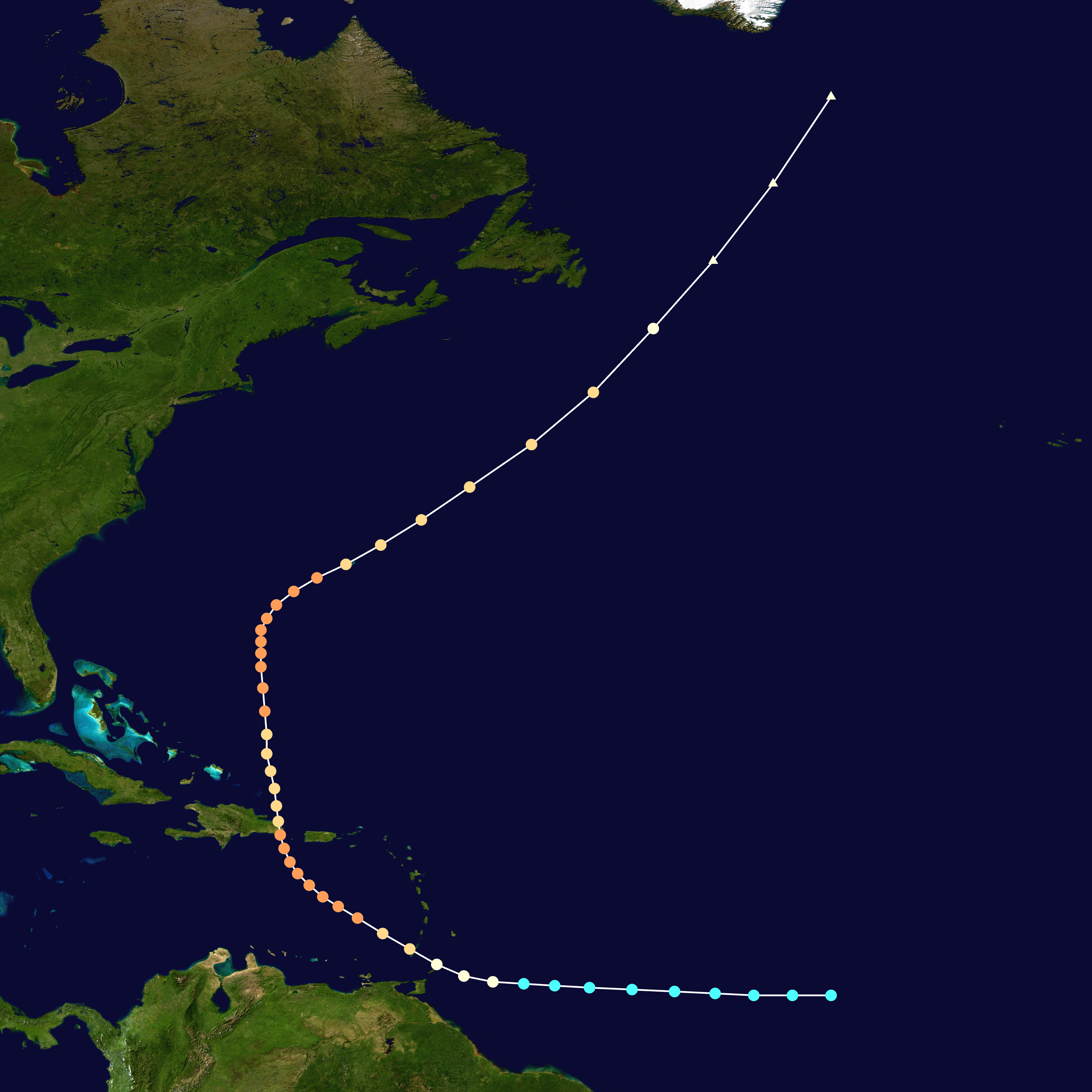
- Duration: September 6 – September 17
- Peak intensity: 125 mph (205 km/h) (1-min); 961 mbar (hPa)

A tropical storm was first observed about 500 mi (800 km) east of the island of Trinidad on September 6. It moved nearly due westward and struck the Windward Islands on September 8 as a Category 1 hurricane. The storm moved northwestward across the Caribbean and intensified into a major hurricane on September 9. Thereafter, the cyclone began to curve northward, and early on September 11, it made landfall in the Dominican Republic near Boca de Yuma at peak intensity as a Category 3 hurricane with winds of 125 mph (201 km/h). The storm weakened to a Category 2 hurricane after striking the island, but re-strengthened into a Category 3 while northeast of the Bahamas on September 13. The storm curved northeastward on September 14 and began accelerated. On the following day, the system weakened to a Category 2 hurricane near Bermuda. Early on September 17, the system weakened to a Category 1 hurricane and soon transitioned into an extratropical cyclone about 310 mi (500 km) east of Newfoundland. The remnants were absorbed by a larger extratropical storm later on September 17.

On Grenada, a number of homes were destroyed, while several other buildings suffered damage. The storm severely damaged nutmeg and cocoa crops, the latter of which was estimated to require at least seven years to be re-established. Telephone communications in rural areas were lost. At least two deaths occurred on the island. On Saint Vincent, trees and telegraph and telephone lines were downed. Extensive crop and property damage was reported, with thousands of people left homeless. Strong winds on Trinidad disrupted telegraphic communications. A number of lights and small craft at Port of Spain and San Fernando were sunk or washed ashore. Two fatalities occurred on the island, one from drowning and the other from electrocution. Throughout the Windward Islands, 80 deaths were reported. Strong winds generated by the storm caused extensive damage to buildings in Puerto Rico and Bermuda, with one fatality in the former. This storm is also known as the San Pedro hurricane.

=== Hurricane Four ===
- Category 1 hurricane (SSHWS)
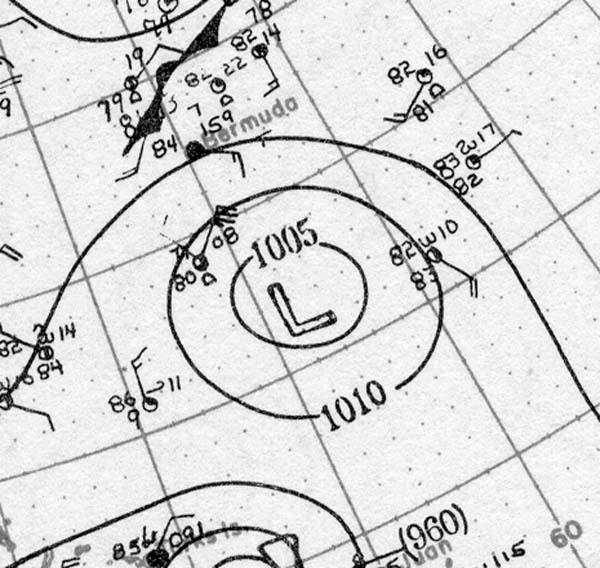
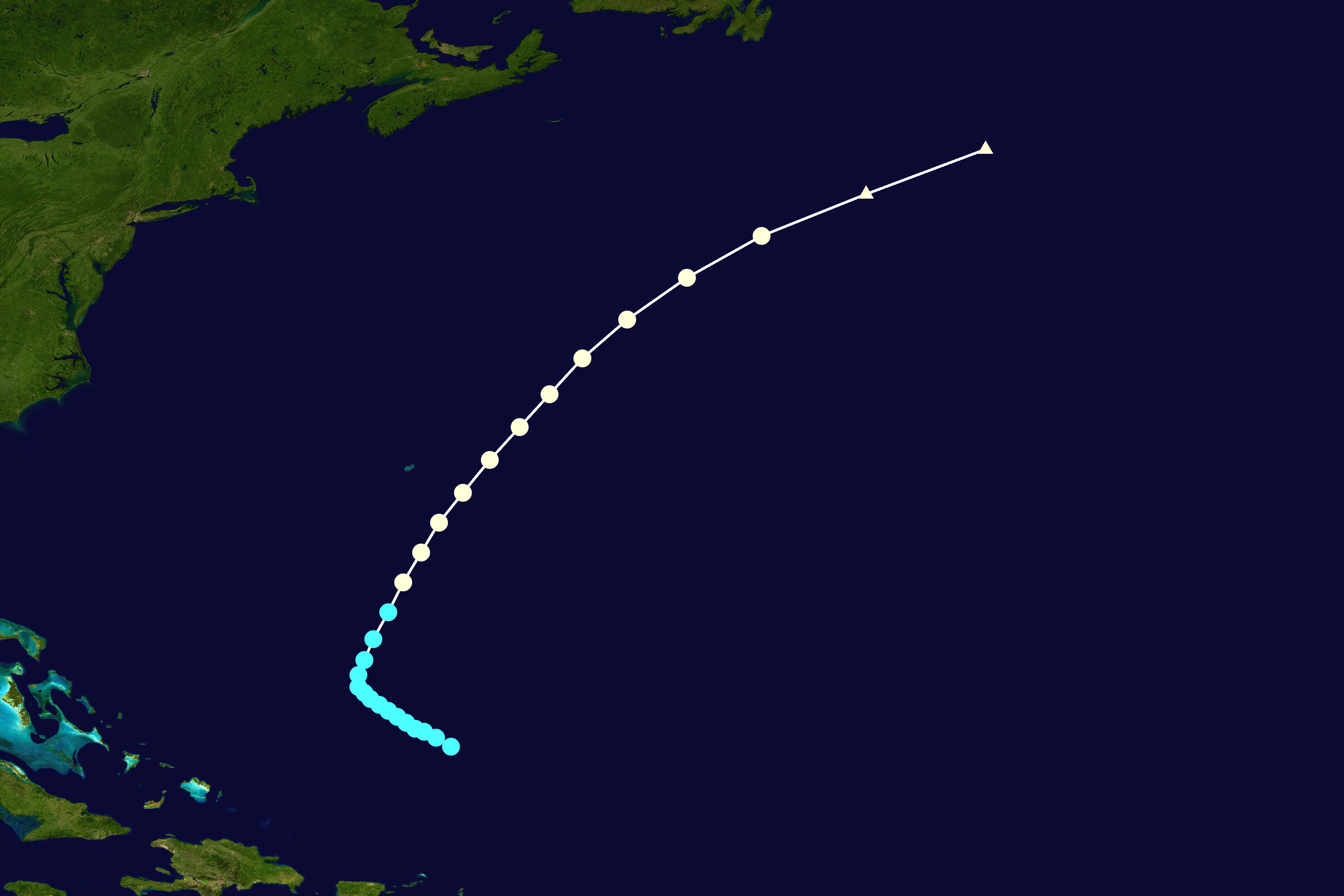
- Duration: September 8 – September 14
- Peak intensity: 90 mph (150 km/h) (1-min); 979 mbar (hPa)

A low pressure area of non-tropical origins became a tropical storm on September 8 while situated about 300 mi (480 km) north of the Lesser Antilles. The storm moved slowly west-northwestward over the next few days with little change in intensity. By September 10, the cyclone curved north-northeastward, sped-up, and began to strengthen. Late on September 11, the storm reached hurricane status. While passing east of Bermuda on the following day, the system peaked with maximum sustained winds of 90 mph (140 km/h). The hurricane accelerated after bypassing the island due to an approaching cold front. A ship observed a barometric pressure of 979 mbar (28.9 inHg) around 09:00 UTC on September 14, the lowest known pressure in relation to the storm. Three hours later, however, the hurricane transitioned into an extratropical cyclone about 400 mi (640 km) southeast of Newfoundland. The extratropical storm was absorbed by a larger extratropical cyclone late on September 14.

=== Tropical Storm Five ===
- Tropical storm (SSHWS)
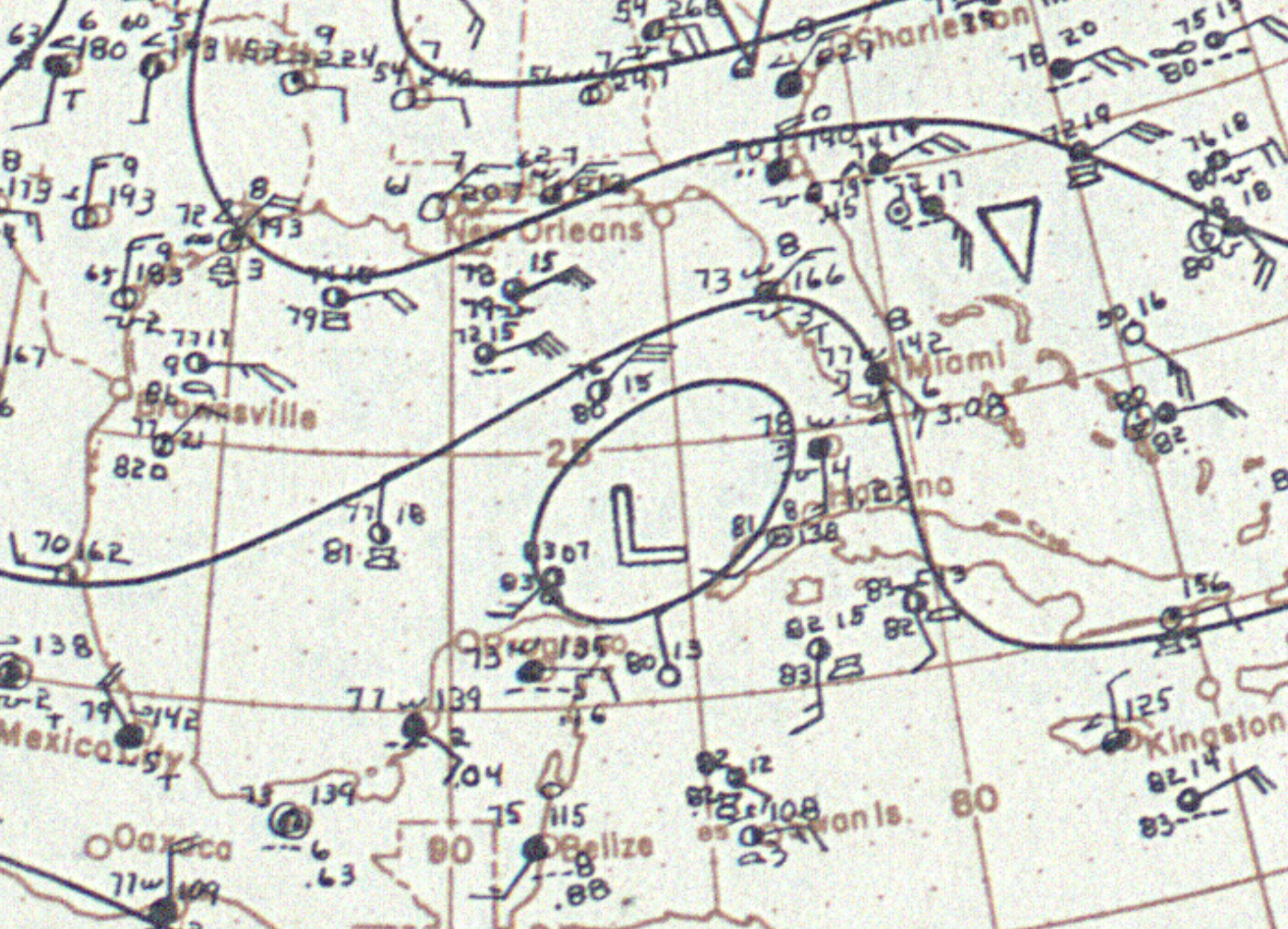
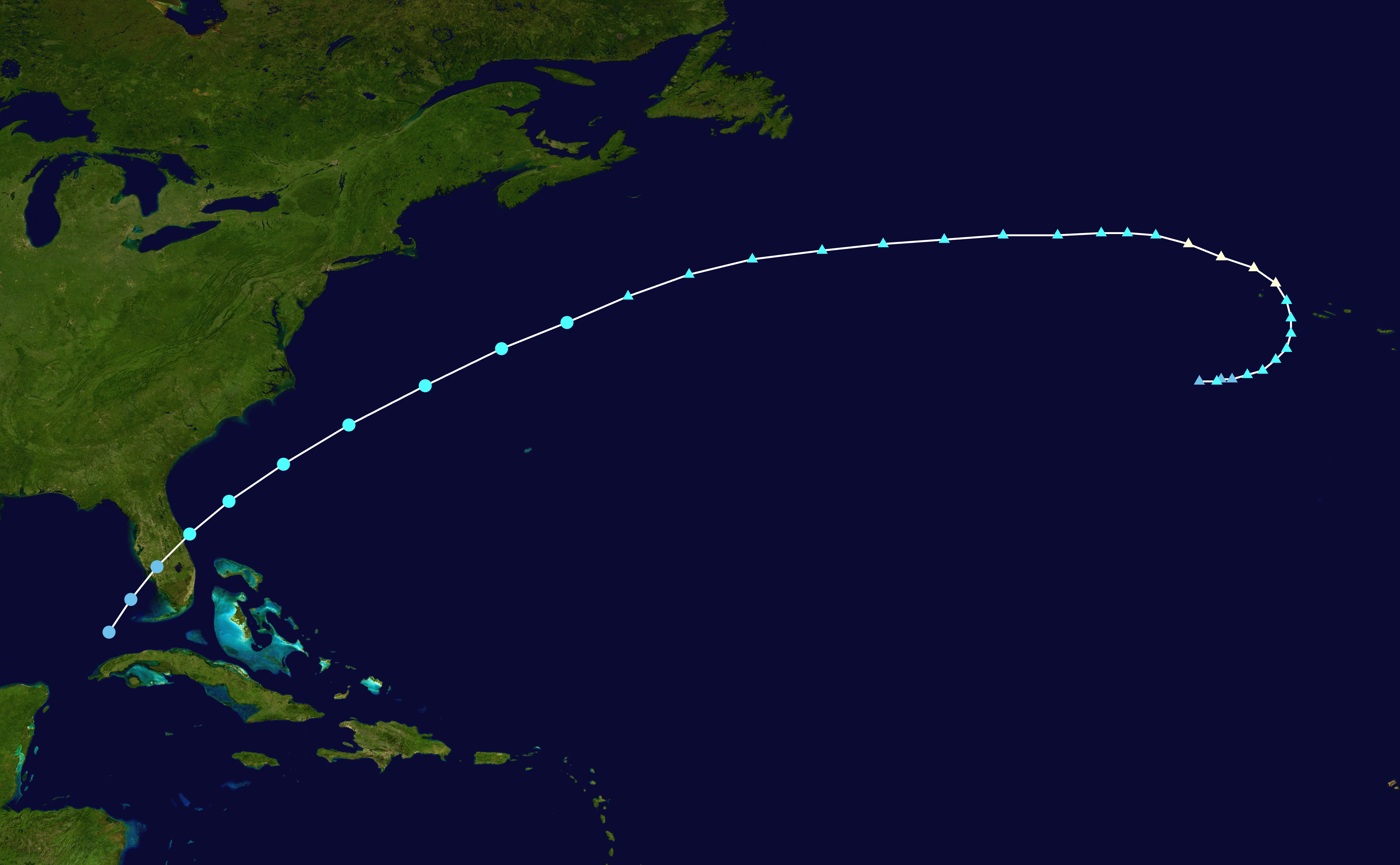
- Duration: October 15 – October 17
- Peak intensity: 70 mph (110 km/h) (1-min); <998 mbar (hPa)

A low pressure area developed into a tropical depression about 80 mi (130 km) southwest of the Florida Keys at 12:00 UTC on October 15. The depression moved rapidly north-northeastward and made landfall near Cape Coral, Florida, several hours later. Shortly after emerging into the Atlantic near Cape Canaveral early on October 16, the cyclone intensified into a tropical storm. Around 12:00 UTC on October 17, the system peaked with maximum sustained winds of 70 mph (110 km/h) and a minimum barometric pressure of 998 mbar (29.5 inHg); both were observations by a ship. By 00:00 UTC on the following day, the storm transitioned into an extratropical cyclone about 310 mi (500 km) south of Sable Island. The remnants continued eastward across the Atlantic and intensified into the equivalence of a Category 1 hurricane while approaching the Azores. The extratropical cyclone then moved in a semi-circulation path before dissipating southwest of the islands early on October 24.

=== Hurricane Six ===
Tampa Bay hurricane of 1921 or 1921 Tarpon Springs hurricane

- Category 4 hurricane (SSHWS)
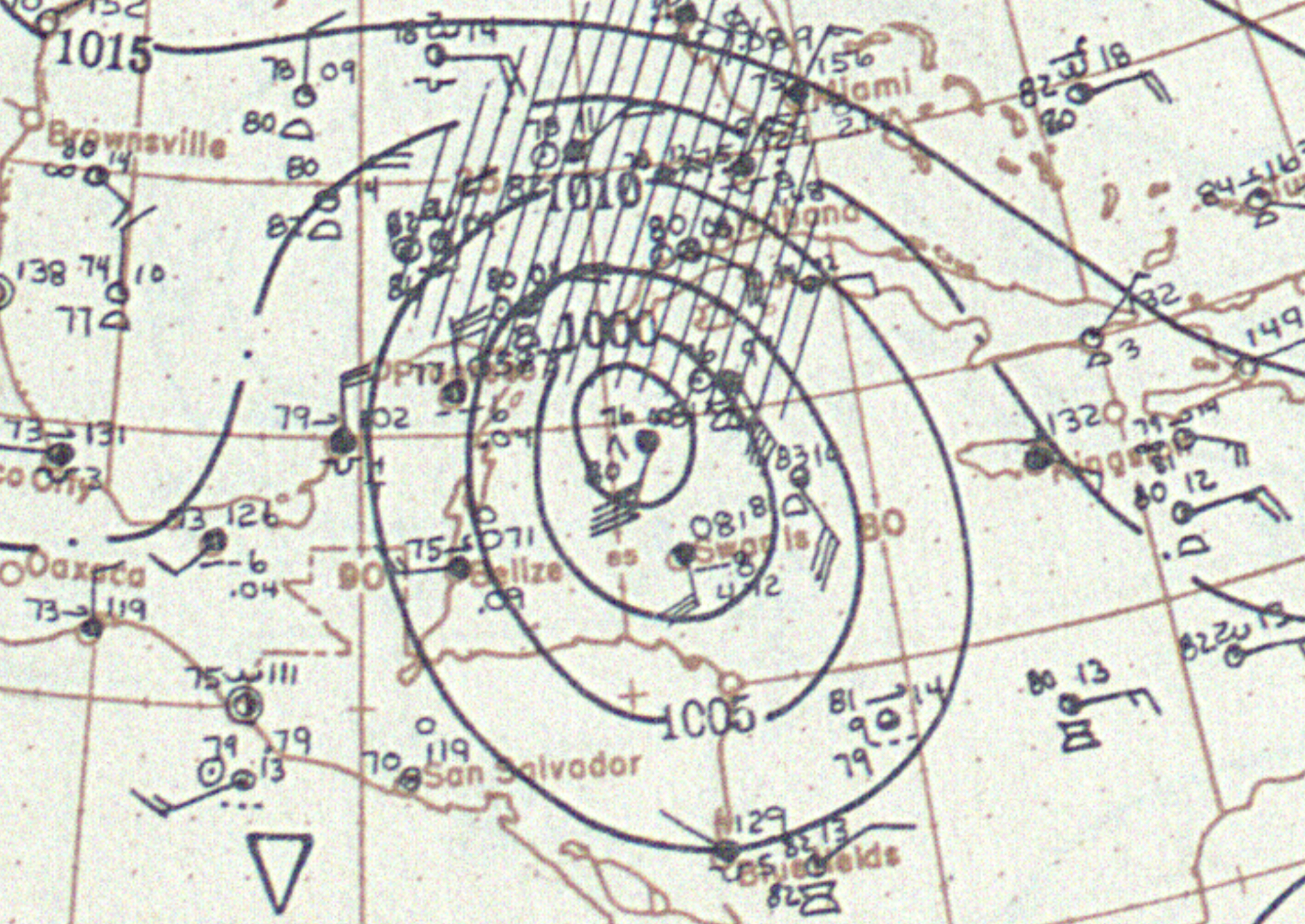
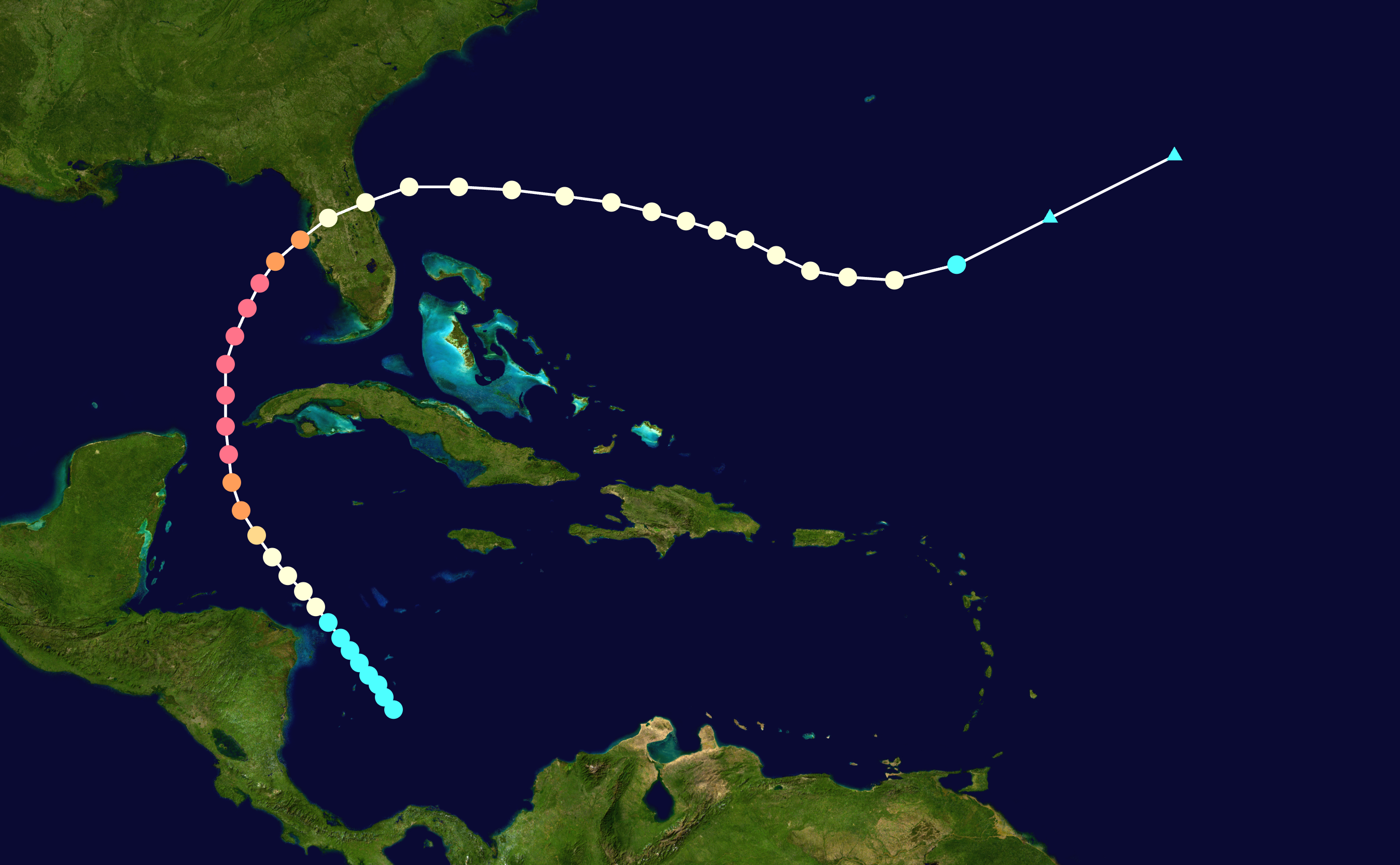
- Duration: October 20 – October 29
- Peak intensity: 140 mph (220 km/h) (1-min); 941 mbar (hPa)

A tropical storm developed from a trough in the southwestern Caribbean Sea on October 20. The system moved northwestward and intensified into a hurricane on October 22 and a major hurricane by October 23. Later that day, the cyclone peaked as a Category 4 with winds of 140 mph (230 km/h). After entering the Gulf of Mexico, the hurricane gradually curved northeastward and weakened to a Category 3 before making landfall near Tarpon Springs, Florida, late on October 25. The storm quickly weakened to a Category 1 hurricane while crossing Central Florida, before reaching the Atlantic Ocean early on the following day. Thereafter, system moved east-southeastward and remained fairly steady in intensity before weakening to a tropical storm late on October 29. The storm was then absorbed by a larger extratropical cyclone early the next day, with the remnants of the hurricane soon becoming indistinguishable.

The storm brought strong winds to the Swan Islands, including hurricane-force winds on the main island. Heavy rains fell in Cuba, particularly in Pinar del Río Province, but only minor damage occurred. In Florida, storm surge and abnormally high tides caused damage along much of the state's west coast from Pasco County southward. Several neighborhoods and sections of Tampa were inundated, especially in Ballast Point, DeSoto Park, Edgewater Park, Hyde Park, Palmetto Beach, and other areas in the vicinity of Bayshore Boulevard. Strong winds also damaged hundreds of trees, signs, buildings, and homes. Five deaths occurred in Tampa, two from drowning and three after people came into contact with a live wire. The storm left two additional fatalities in St. Petersburg. A number of streets in Tarpon Springs were littered with masses of debris, with many structures and trees suffering extensive damage. Strong winds occurred as far east as the Atlantic coast of the state, though wind damage east of the Tampa Bay area was generally limited to downed trees and power lines, resulting in power outages, particularly in Orlando. Agriculture throughout the state experienced significant impact as well, including over $2 million in damage and the loss of at least 800,000 boxes of citrus crops alone. Overall, the hurricane left at least eight deaths and about $10 million in damage.

=== Tropical Storm Seven ===
- Tropical storm (SSHWS)
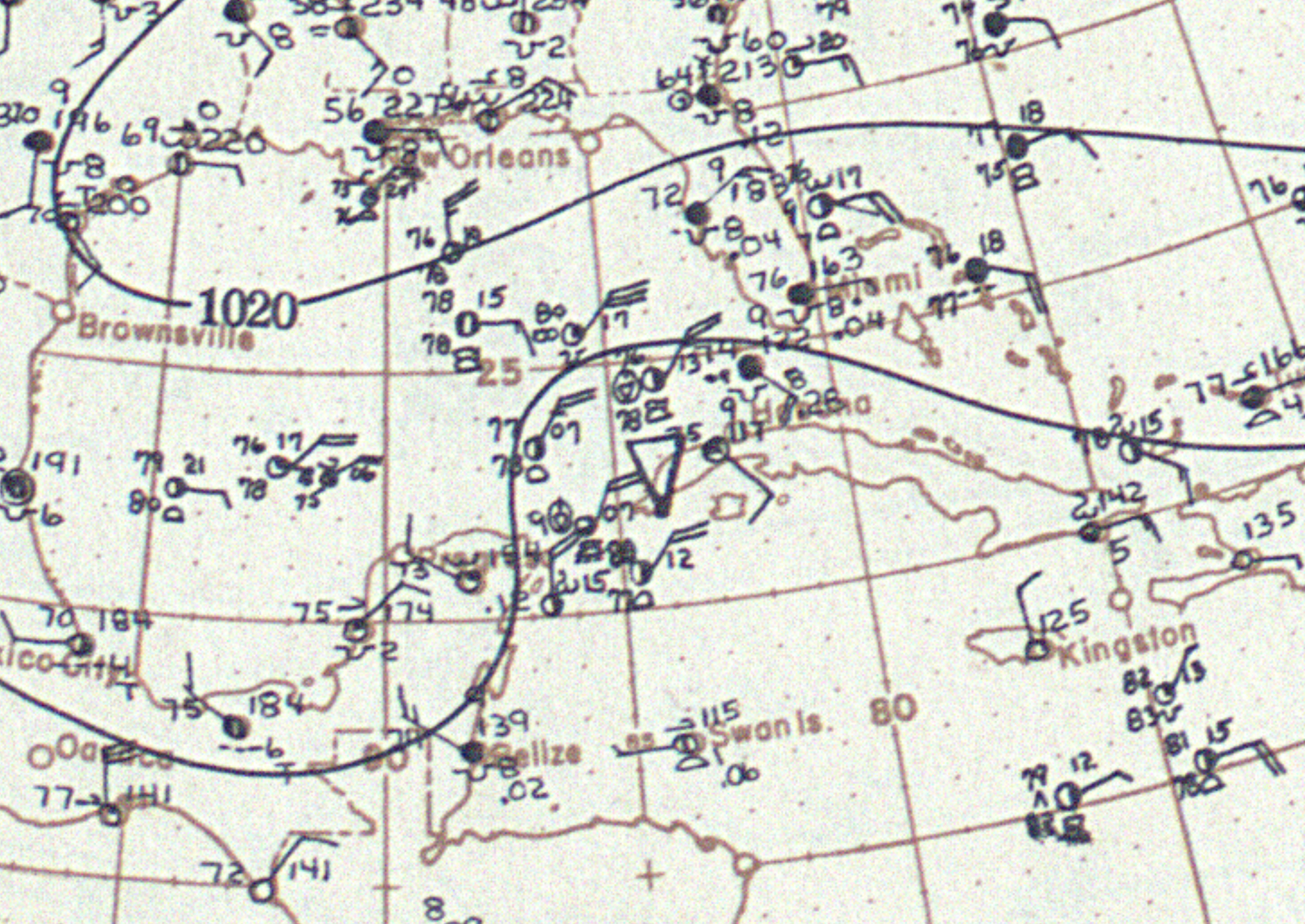
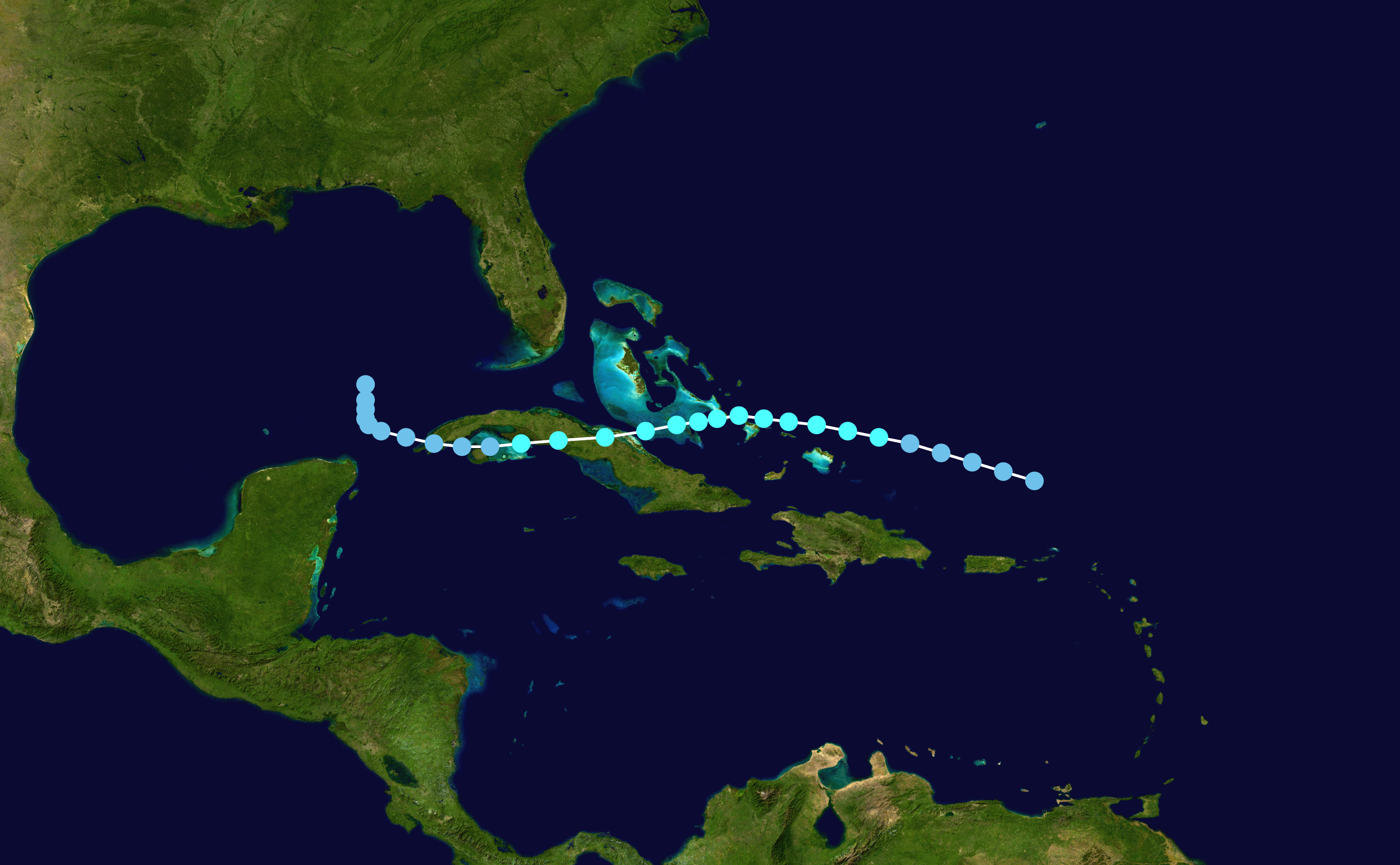
- Duration: November 19 – November 25
- Peak intensity: 60 mph (95 km/h) (1-min); <1003 mbar (hPa)

A tropical depression formed about 185 mi (298 km) north-northeast of San Juan, Puerto Rico, early on November 19. Moving west-northwestward, the depression slowly strengthened, becoming a tropical storm on November 20. The following day, it began moving through the Bahamas and peaked with winds of 60 mph (97 km/h), based on observations from the S. S. Mexican. Late on November 21, the storm began moving west-southwestward while centered near Long Island. The cyclone then began steadily weakening. Between 12:00 UTC and 18:00 UTC on November 22, the system made landfall in Cuba near Cayo Romano with winds of 45 mph (72 km/h). Early on November 23, the storm emerged over the Gulf of Batabanó and soon weakened to a tropical depression. The system moved westward, brushing Isla de la Juventud and striking Pinar del Río Province early on November 24. After emerging into the Gulf of Mexico, the storm curved northward and drifted, until dissipating on November 25. This storm was not considered a tropical cyclone until 2009, as part of the Atlantic hurricane reanalysis project, which researches information about past tropical cyclones to reduce inaccuracies and omissions in the best track. The cyclone left no significant impacts in the Bahamas, Cuba, or Florida. A sustained wind speed of 41 mph (66 km/h) was observed at Sand Key Light in Florida.

=== Other systems ===
In addition to the seven tropical storms, five other systems formed but failed to reach tropical storm intensity. The first such cyclone developed over the northwestern Caribbean on June 1. Moving quickly northeastward, the depression crossed Cuba and the Bahamas before reaching the western Atlantic. The depression became extratropical by June 3. On July 5, a tropical depression formed in the northeastern Gulf of Mexico. Tracking to the west, the depression degenerated into a trough while offshore Louisiana on July 8. That day, 5-minute sustained wind speeds of 39 and 40 mph (63 and 64 km/h) were observed in Galveston and Corpus Christi in Texas, respectively. The depression regained a closed circulation by July 10, shortly before making landfall near Galveston. By July 11, the system dissipated over northern Texas.

Another tropical depression developed from a low pressure area over the northeastern Gulf of Mexico on July 28. The depression tracked northwestward and made landfall in Franklin County, Florida, early on July 29. It dissipated over Georgia by the next day. A tropical depression formed in the Bay of Campeche on September 23. The depression moved westward into Mexico just north of Veracruz and is believed to have dissipated later that day. Veracruz recorded a wind gust of 29 mph (47 km/h). The final system which failed to reach tropical storm intensity formed over the Bay of Campeche on October 5 as a low pressure system along a decaying cold front. The depression made landfall in Mexico and rapidly dissipated. Wind speeds of 40 mph (64 km/h) at Veracruz and Villahermosa suggest that the depression may have become a tropical storm.

== See also ==
- 1900–1940 South Pacific cyclone seasons
- 1900–1950 South-West Indian Ocean cyclone seasons
- 1920s Australian region cyclone seasons
