= Saint Augustine Blues =

Flag of the Saint Augustine Blues

The Saint Augustine Blues, also known as the Independent Blues, were a militia unit that fought for the Confederacy during the American Civil War. After serving in the local community, the unit was eventually organized into the Third Florida Infantry where it fought in several engagements including the campaigns of the Army of Tennessee.

== Demographics ==
Some members of the Saint Augustine Blues were of Menorcan descent as well a smaller group of Italians and Greeks. The average age of the company at mustering was 24 years old, with 16 of its members being under the age of 17. Some former members of the Blues as well as other Confederate veterans are buried in the Tolomato Cemetery a historic Catholic cemetery in Saint Augustine.

According to records, there were 3-4 black or mixed-race freemen who served in the unit as musicians. This was unusual, if not unique, for a Confederate fighting unit.

== Service history ==
On May 12, 1860, as political instability increased throughout the United States, a group of about 70 citizens from St. Augustine, Florida met in the town's city hall to discuss formation of the unit.

Like other cities in the south, many residents of St. Augustine came to favor disunion following the election of Abraham Lincoln. Some citizens issued a declaration calling for no compromise with the north and St. Augustine Examiner applauded the delegates from Florida who were sent to the secession convention by stating: "all who engage in it are exercising their rights as FREEMEN and INDEPENDENT citizens. We are FREEMEN, the government has once admitted that we were, now should we submit to those who say we are not?"

Officers were elected including the captain, a prominent town official named John Lott Philips. Philips was born on the island of Saint Helena, and had met General Napoleon Bonaparte. Philips was also a veteran of the Second Seminole War, during which he commanded a unit that included future pro-slavery Florida senator David Yulee.

During a mustering in November 1860, the unit was described in a report as an "elegant and gallant corps" and, the following month, offered to serve as a "minute men" company for the town of St. Augustine.

Days before Florida officially seceded in early January 1861, around 125 militiamen seized Fort Marion. Members of the Blues were most likely a part of the capturing force.

In March 1861, the unit were ordered to cease their patrols around the city as there was an uptick in thefts which were, according to Mayor Rafael Canova, "attributable to the Company called the 'Blues.'"

The Blues officially entered the Confederate Army at Ft. Marion on August 5, 1861, and were designated Company B of the recently organized Third Florida Infantry.

On July 25, 1862, the Blues suffered its first casualty when, while stationed at Mobile, Alabama, Private Thomas Ponce died from an illness. Many other members of the unit suffered from sickness during the month long station at Mobile. Illnesses that afflicted the regiment included measles and mumps.

The Blues sustained heavy casualties in the Battle of Murfreesboro in Tennessee. The following year they marched to Mississippi in an effort to relieve the Siege of Vicksburg and in the fall of 1863, they fought in the battles of Chickamauga and Chattanooga. In the spring of 1865 the unit was in the Carolinas trying to slow the advance of General William Tecumseh Sherman after Sherman's 'March to the Sea'.

The Saint Augustine Blues service in the Civil War ended on April 26, 1865, one month after their participation in the Battle of Bentonville after General Joseph E. Johnston surrendered to General Sherman at Bennett Place, in Durham, North Carolina, the site of the largest surrender of Confederate soldiers, which ended the war.

== See also ==
- Florida Civil War Confederate Units
