= 3rd Florida Infantry Regiment =

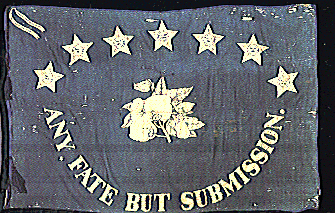
- Flag of Company B, 3rd Florida Infantry, nicknamed the St. Augustine Blues
- Active: August 10, 1861 – April 9, 1865
- Country: Confederate States of America
- Allegiance: Confederate Florida; Confederate States of America
- Branch: Confederate States Army
- Type: Regiment
- Role: Infantry
- Size: 1,236 Soldiers
- Part of: Army of Tennessee
- Engagements: American Civil War

Commanders
- Colonel of the Regiment: Col. William Scott Dilworth

The 3rd Florida Infantry Regiment was an infantry regiment that fought for the Confederacy in American Civil War. The regiment was formed in the summer of 1861 and served until it surrendered in 1865.

== Organization ==
The 3rd Florida Infantry was formed near Pensacola, Florida, in July, 1861. Its companies were recruited in the counties of St. Johns, Hernando, Jefferson, Duval, Wakulla, Madison, Columbia, and Suwannee. In Company C, the average age of the eighty-seven enlisted men was twenty-five, with the youngest being fifteen and the oldest forty-four. The unit served along the coast at Talbot Island and Cedar Keys, then moved to Mobile. After fighting at Perryville it was assigned to Preston's, Stovall's, Finley's, J.A. Smith's Brigade, and during December, 1862, consolidated with the 1st Florida Infantry Regiment along with other units from Florida to become the Florida Brigade of the Army of Tennessee. It was organized with 950 officers and men, and the 1st and 3rd lost twenty-six percent of the 23 in action at Chickamauga. In December, 1863, this command totaled 240 men and 119 arms, but only a remnant surrendered in April, 1865. The field officers were Colonel William S. Dilworth; Lieutenant Colonels Lucius A. Church, Elisha Mashburn, and Arthur J.T. Wright; and Major John L. Phillips.

== Companies ==
Company	County	Nickname	Commander	Number of Soldiers
F&S			Col. William S. Dilworth	20
A	Duval	Jacksonville Light Infantry	Capt. Holmes Steele	118
B	St. Johns	Saint Augustine Blues	Capt. John Lott Philips	124
C	Hernando	Hernando Guards (Wildcats)	Capt. Walter Terry Saxon	112
D	Wakulla	Wakulla Guards	Capt. Daniel L. Frierson	103
E	Jefferson	Jefferson Beauragards	Capt. Daniel E. Bird	123
F	Duval	Cow Boys	Capt. Lucius A. Hardee	111
G	Madison	Madison Grey Eagles	Capt. Thomas Langford	165
H	Jefferson	Jefferson Rifles	Capt. William Girardeau	132
I	Columbia	Dixie Stars	Capt. Jesse B. Wood	91
K	Columbia & Suwanee	Columbia & Suwanee Guards	Capt. William Parker	107

== Service history ==
Much of the unit was armed with the Enfield rifle, which were supplied to the regiment late in March 1862. Around the same time, a portion of the regiment defeated a small U.S. naval force that was attempting to land near New Smyrna. Sometime in late-April, early-May 1862, the regiment was gifted a new battle-flag made by a group of women from Jefferson County. The flag had the motto “We Yield But in Death.” The regiment adopted a stuffed wildcat as their mascot, which traveled with its owners; Company C, who were dubbed “The Hernando Wildcats.”

The 1st and 3rd were engaged at Murfreesboro and Jackson, then participated in the campaigns of the Army of Tennessee from Chickamauga to Bentonville.

== Engagements and Battles ==
1862

- New Smyrna (Companies E & H were involved)
- Skirmish of the Brick Church
- Kentucky Campaign
  - Battle of Perryville

1863

- Battle of Murfreesboro
- Vicksburg Campaign
  - Siege of Jackson
- Battle of Chickamauga
- Battles for Chattanooga

1864

- Atlanta campaign
  - Battle of New Hope Church
  - Battle of Dallas
  - Battle of Atlanta
  - Battle of Ezra Church
  - Siege of Atlanta
- Battle of Spring Hill
- Battle of Franklin
- Battle of Nashville

1865

- Carolinas campaign
  - Battle of Bentonville

== See also ==
- Florida Civil War Confederate Units
