= George Hardy =

George Hardy may refer to:

- George Hardy (actor) (born 1954), American dentist and star of cult film Troll 2
- George Hardy (labor leader) (1911–1990), Canadian-American labor leader
- George Hardy (artist) (1822–1909), British genre painter
- George Hardy (Liberal politician) (1851–1920), British member of parliament for Stowmarket 1906–1910
- George Francis Hardy (1855–1914), British actuary and amateur astronomer
- George Hardy (communist) (1884–1966), English communist
- George Hardy (Tuskegee Airman) (1925–2025), African-American Tuskegee airman
- George Hudleston Hurlstone Hardy (1892–1966), entomologist
- W. G. Hardy (1895–1979), Canadian professor, writer, and ice hockey administrator
- George Hardy, a fictional shepherd who is the murder victim of the 2026 film The Sheep Detectives, portrayed by Hugh Jackman

== See also ==
- George Hardie (disambiguation)
