= George Hardie =

George Hardie may refer to:

- George Hardie (artist) (born 1944), English artist involved with the graphic design company Hipgnosis
- George Hardie (politician) (c. 1874–1937), Scottish Labour politician, MP for Springburn
- George Hardie (tennis) (born 1953), American tennis player
- George Hardie (footballer) (1873–?), English footballer

== See also ==
- George Hardy (disambiguation)
