= Walter Terry Saxon =

American politician and Ku Klux Klan member (1836–1924)

Walter Terry Saxon (April 23, 1836 - December 23, 1924) was a state legislator in the U.S. state of Florida. His father was a prominent plantation owner. He served in the Confederate Army, and was a Ku Klux Klan organizer. He represented Hernando County in the Florida Legislature in 1867. He moved to Texas.

Saxon was born in Autauga County, Alabama. He studied at Alabama Military Institute, and then worked as a surveyor and settled in Brooksville, Florida. He surveyed in The Everglades before the American Civil War and for the Iron Mountain Railroad after it.

He organized the Hernando Guards during the American Civil War and captained its Company C. He served in the 3rd Florida Infantry Regiment.

Saxon moved to Texas in 1873. He co-founded the Hamilton Herald. He edited a Hamilton County newspaper and served as county surveyor in Hamilton County. He was survived by a son and daughter.

His brother Benjamin Saxon served as sheriff of Hernando County and died after delivering 1876 election results to Tallahassee.
