= Captiva School and Chapel-by-the-Sea Historic District =

Historic church in Florida, United States

- U.S. National Register of Historic Places
- U.S. Historic district
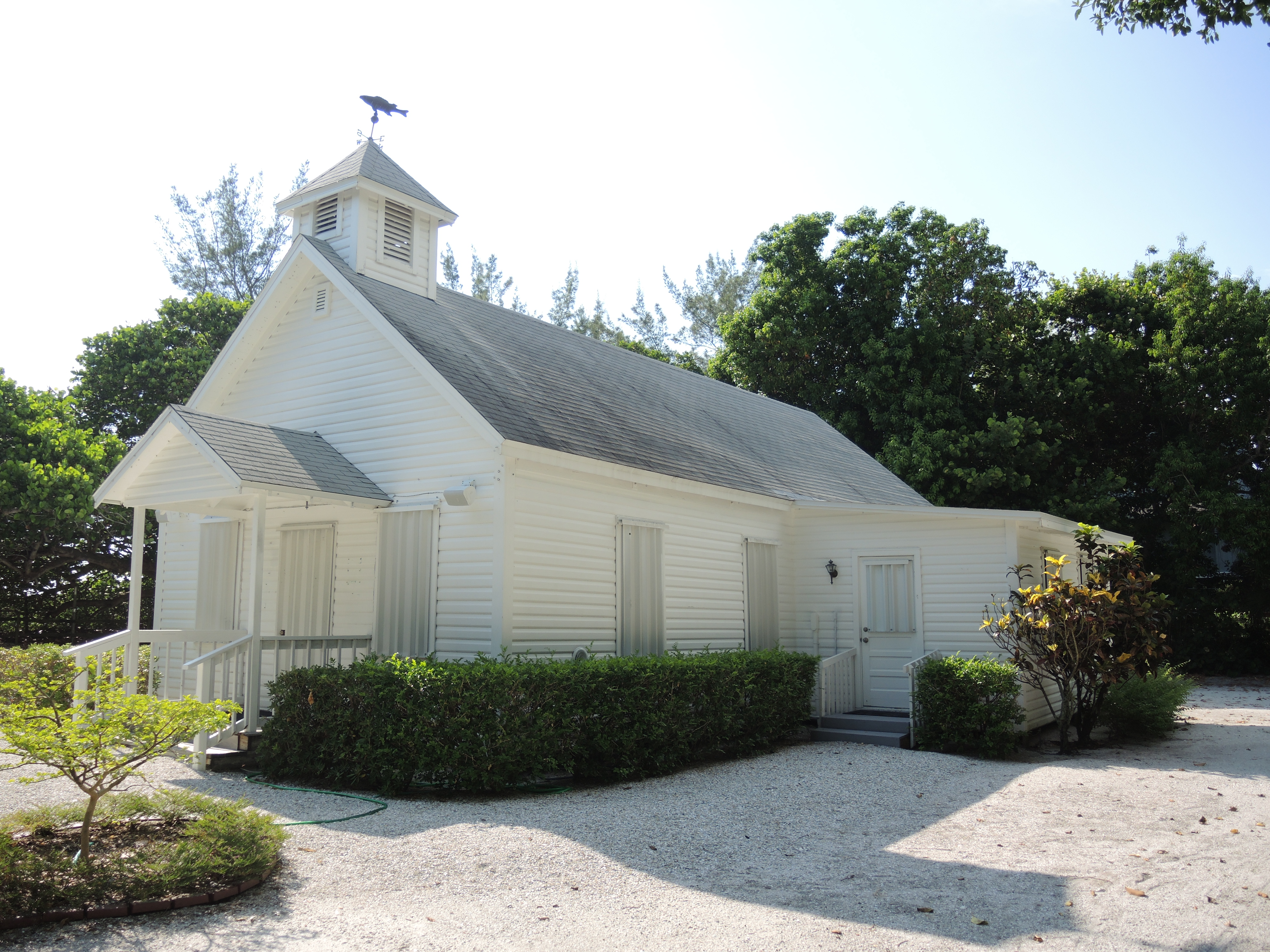
- Chapel by the Sea

- Location within Florida Location within the United States
- Location: Captiva, Florida
- Coordinates: 26°31′14.47″N 82°11′33.62″W
- NRHP reference No.: 13000853
- Added to NRHP: 23 October 2013

Captiva School and Chapel-by-the-Sea Historic District is a national historic district located at Captiva, Florida in Lee County. It includes an early one-room schoolhouse, built in 1901 and transformed into a Methodist mission church in 1921.

It was added to the National Register of Historic Places in 2013.
