= Robert A. Hardee =

American politician

Robert Augustus Hardee

Member of the Florida House of Representatives from Brevard County
- In office 1873–1875
- Preceded by: James Paine, Sr.
- Succeeded by: Quinn Bass
- In office 1897–1899
- Preceded by: W. R. Sanders
- Succeeded by: Henry L. Parker

Personal details
- Born: May 27, 1833 Georgia
- Died: November 27, 1909 (aged 76) Fort Pierce, Florida
- Resting place: Sebastian Cemetery, Sebastian, Florida
- Party: Democratic
- Spouse: Emma Provids Willard Hardee
- Children: Robert G. Hardee

Military service
- Allegiance: Confederate States of America
- Rank: Captain
- Unit: Company H, Ninth Georgia Infantry
- Battles/wars: Battle of the Wilderness, Siege of Knoxville, Battle of Gettysburg

Robert Augustus Hardee (May 27, 1833 – November 27, 1909) was a member of the Florida House of Representatives in the sessions of 1873, 1874, and 1897. He was also a member of the Brevard County Board of Commissioners.

He was the son of Thomas E. Hardee and Grace Jones, and the brother of Gardner S. Hardee, and Buddy Hardee.

He moved to New Haven, Florida (the original name of Sebastian) in 1889.

== See also ==
- List of members of the Florida House of Representatives from Brevard County, Florida

| Preceded by James Paine, Sr. | Member of the Florida House of Representatives from Brevard County; 1873–1875 | Succeeded by Quinn Bass |
| Preceded by W. R. Sanders | Member of the Florida House of Representatives from Brevard County; 1897–1899 | Succeeded by Henry L. Parker |
