= George Hardie (footballer) =

English footballer

Personal information
- Date of birth: 1873
- Place of birth: Stanley, Derbyshire, England
- Position: Goalkeeper

Senior career*
Years	Team	Apps	(Gls)
1888–1893	West Hallam		
1893–1894	Denaby Wanderers		
1894–1895	Conisbrough		
1895–1897	Mexborough		
1897	Grimsby Town	6	(0)
1897–1898	Mexborough		
1898–1899	Lincoln City	12	(0)
- * Club domestic league appearances and goals

George Hardie (born 1873) was an English professional footballer who played as a goalkeeper.
