= Palmetto Beach Historic District =

Historic district in Florida, United States

- U.S. National Register of Historic Places
- U.S. Historic district
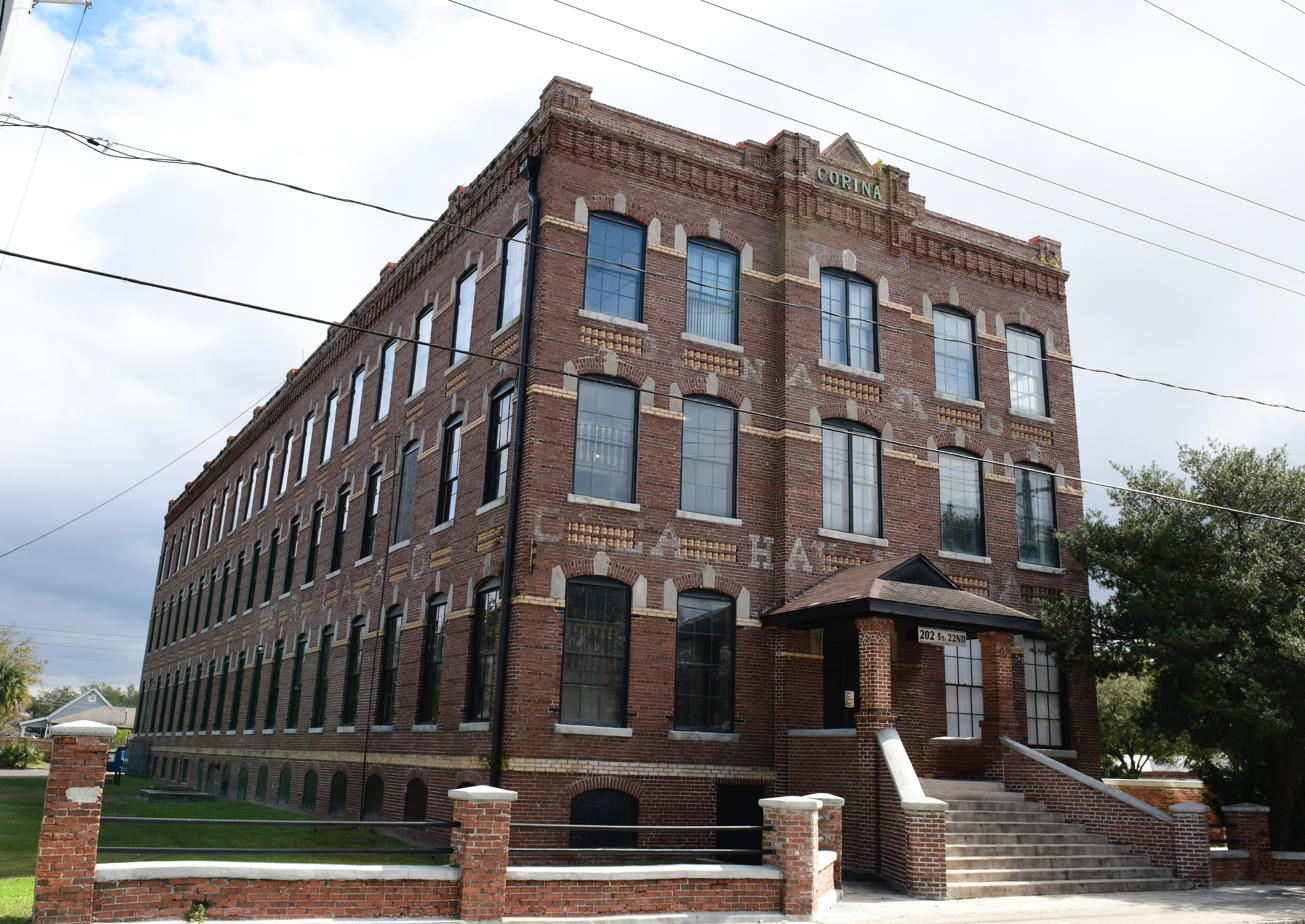
- Corina Building

- Location within Florida Location within the United States
- Location: Tampa, Florida
- Coordinates: 27.94799°N 82.431364°W
- NRHP reference No.: 12000496
- Added to NRHP: August 14, 2012

The Palmetto Beach Historic District is an historic district in Tampa, Florida. It is just south of Ybor City. The neighborhood was platted in 1894. Four cigar factories were built there, the first in 1895. The district was added to the National Register of Historic Places on August 14, 2012.
