= Lucius Augustus Hardee =

Lucius Augustus Tarquinses Hardee was born on March 24, 1828, in St. Marys, Georgia. He was the nephew of Lieutenant General William Joseph Hardee. He spent most of his life in Florida. He lived on a plantation home in Duval County, and married Esther Ann Crews Haddock in 1853.

Lucius had fought in the Third Seminole War. When the American Civil War began he joined the Confederate States Army as a Captain in the 3rd Florida Infantry Regiment; commanding Company F which was also known as "Duval County Cow Boys."

Lucius was Chairman of Florida's Democratic Party when Horace Greeley ran for President in 1872 as the representative of the Liberal Republican Party, against the eventually victorious Ulysses S. Grant. The Florida Democratic Party supported Greeley, whose platform included ending Reconstruction.

He raised long staple cotton before the American Civil War on his plantation, called "Rural Home". After the war he grew citrus and other plants on the lands of his rebuilt "Honeymoon Home". Lucius was known by the sobriquet of Colonel Hardee, though official promotion to this rank has not been documented. He was the subject of 5 pages from Harriet Beecher Stowe's book on Florida Life, Palmetto-Leaves, published in 1872. Stowe's visit with Hardee describes the post-plantation nursery as a thriving business led by the energy and industry of this pioneer horticulturist.

Hardee died of malaria on February 9, 1885, in Duval County, Florida, and is buried in the Old City Cemetery in Jacksonville, Florida.

== Sources ==
- 1860 Duval County Florida Agriculture Census - plantation listed under Esther Hardee
- Smithsonian American Art Museum - Art Inventories database
- "Palmetto-Leaves", Harriet Beecher Stowe, 1872, Boston: James R. Osgood and Company, pp 178–184 - Horticulturist, Mr. Hardee.
- A portrait of Lucius can be found in a book published by the National Society Dames of America, Georgia, titled "Early Georgia Portraits 1715-1870", Athens, Georgia, 1975.
