= Gardner S. Hardee =

American politician

Gardner Sheppard Hardee

Member of the Florida Senate from the 13th district
- In office 1889–1893
- Preceded by: H.S. Williams
- Succeeded by: Robert S. Morrow

Personal details
- Born: July 19, 1842 Brooks County, Georgia
- Died: July 26, 1926 (aged 84) Rockledge, Florida
- Resting place: Cocoa Cemetery, Cocoa, Florida
- Party: Democratic
- Spouse: Emma Joanna Stewart
- Children: 6, Florence, Emma, Grace, Minnie, Ruth & Maude
- Occupation: citrus grower

Military service
- Allegiance: Confederate States of America
- Unit: 9th Georgia Volunteer Infantry, Brooks County Rifles

Gardner Sheppard Hardee (July 19, 1842 – July 26, 1926) was the founding settler of Rockledge, Florida and a member of the Florida Senate representing the 13th district from 1889 to 1892. He was also a member of the Brevard County Board of Commissioners.

He was the son of Thomas E. Hardee and Grace Jones, and the brother of Robert A. Hardee, and Thomas J, Allen W, Andrew J, James B, Ann E, Francis J & Louisa M Hardee.

In 1888, he was elected over Ed Cecil.

Preceded by H.S. Williams	Member of the Florida Senate from the 13th district 1889	Succeeded by Robert S. Morrow
