= Palmetto Beach =

- Neighborhood
- Location within Florida Location within the United States
- Coordinates: 27°56′53″N 82°26′3″W
- Country: United States
- State: Florida
- County: Hillsborough
- City: Tampa

Population (2000)
  - Total: 2,046
- Time zone: UTC-5 (Eastern (EST))
  - Summer (DST): UTC-4 (EDT)
- ZIP codes: 33605 and 33619
- Website: www.palmettobeach.org/welcome/

Palmetto Beach is a neighborhood within the city limits of Tampa, Florida. As of the 2000 census the neighborhood had a population of 2,046. The ZIP Codes serving the neighborhood are 33605 and 33619. The neighborhood is located just south of the historic Ybor City.

Palmetto Beach was first mentioned on local maps in 1889.

== Geography ==
Palmetto Beach boundaries are Adamo Drive to the north, Downtown Tampa to the west, Gary to the east and Hillsborough Bay to the south.

== Demographics ==
Source: Hillsborough County Atlas

As of the census of 2000, there were 2,046 people and 745 households residing in the neighborhood. The population density was 1,853 square miles (4,800 km^{2}). The racial makeup of the neighborhood was 73% White, 7% African American, 1% Native American, 0% Asian, 13% from other races, and 6% from two or more races. Hispanic or Latino of any race were 61% of the population.

There were 745 households, out of which 29% had children under the age of 18 living with them, 42% were married couples living together, 17% had a female householder with no husband present, and 7% were non-families. 27% of all households were made up of individuals.

In the neighborhood the population was spread out, with 27% under the age of 18, 24% from 18 to 34, 21% from 35 to 49, 15% from 50 to 64, and 14% who were 65 years of age or older. For every 100 females, there were 99.8 males.

The per capita income for the neighborhood was $11,763. About 28% of the population were below the poverty line.

== See also ==
- Neighborhoods in Tampa, Florida
