= C. A. Pierce =

American politician from Arizona

Member of the Arizona Senate from the Santa Cruz County district
- In office January 1923 – December 1924
- Preceded by: J. L. Schleimer
- Succeeded by: Leslie C. Hardy

Personal details
- Party: Democratic
- Profession: Politician

Colwell A. Pierce was an American politician from Arizona. He served a single term in the Arizona State Senate during the 6th Arizona State Legislature, holding the seat from Santa Cruz County. He and his wife, Mary, moved to Arizona in 1912, settling near Patagonia. They had two children, a son, Jack, and a daughter, Sallie. From 1914 through 1932 he was a consultant mining engineer in Santa Cruz County. After leaving Arizona, he became the general superintendent of the U. S. Potash company in Carlsbad, New Mexico. Pierce died on October 5, 1954, in El Paso, Texas, where he had been living for four years.
