= Leslie Hardy =

Leslie Hardy may refer to:

- Leslie C. Hardy (1886-1968), American politician in Arizona
- Leslie Hardy (musician), American bassist and organist
