= List of historic properties in Patagonia, Arizona =

- Town
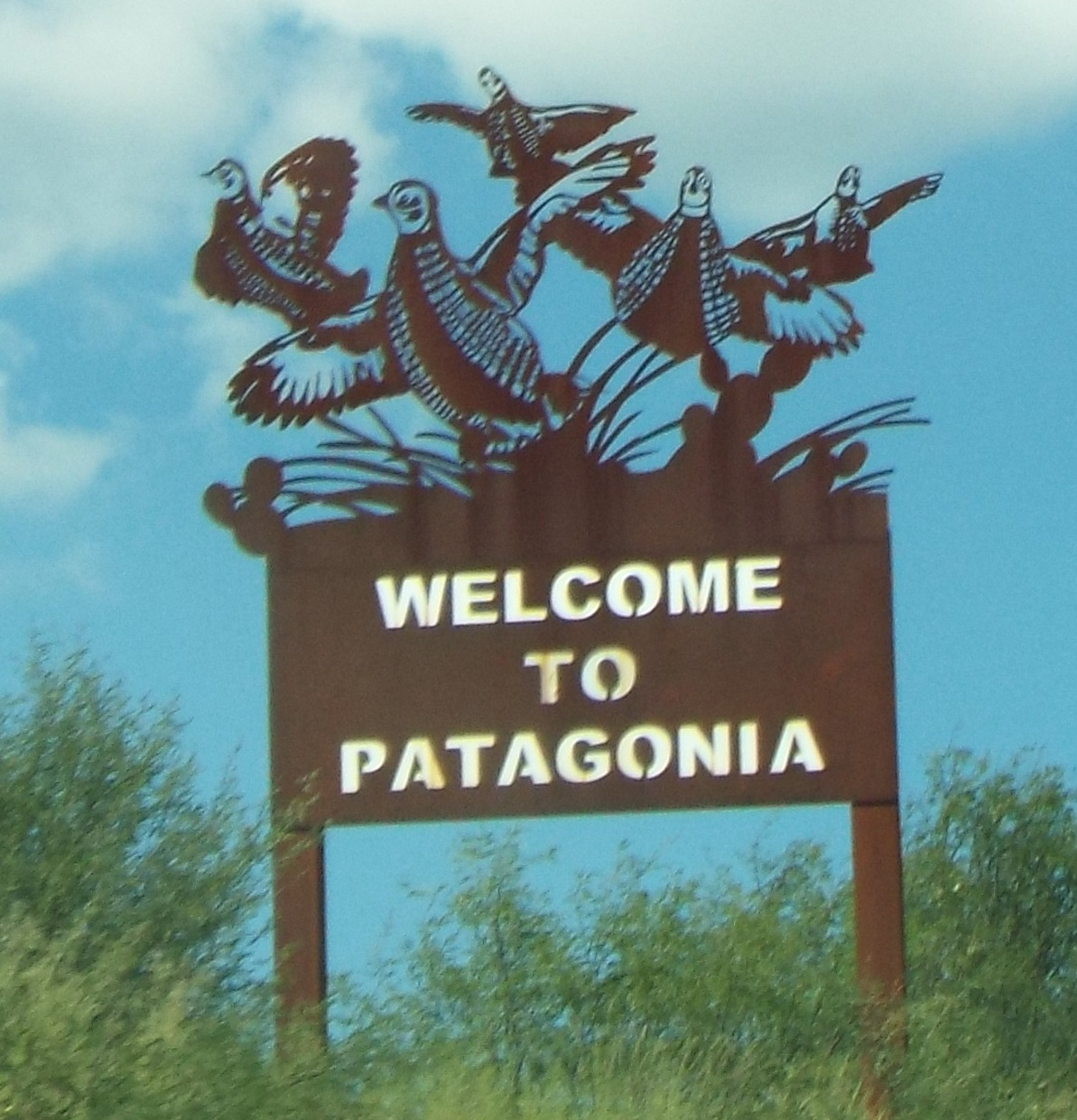
- Welcome to Patagonia

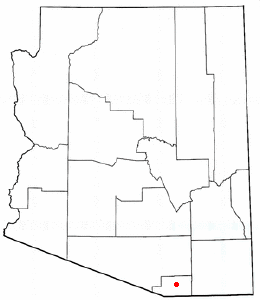
- Location of Patagonia in Santa Cruz County, Arizona.

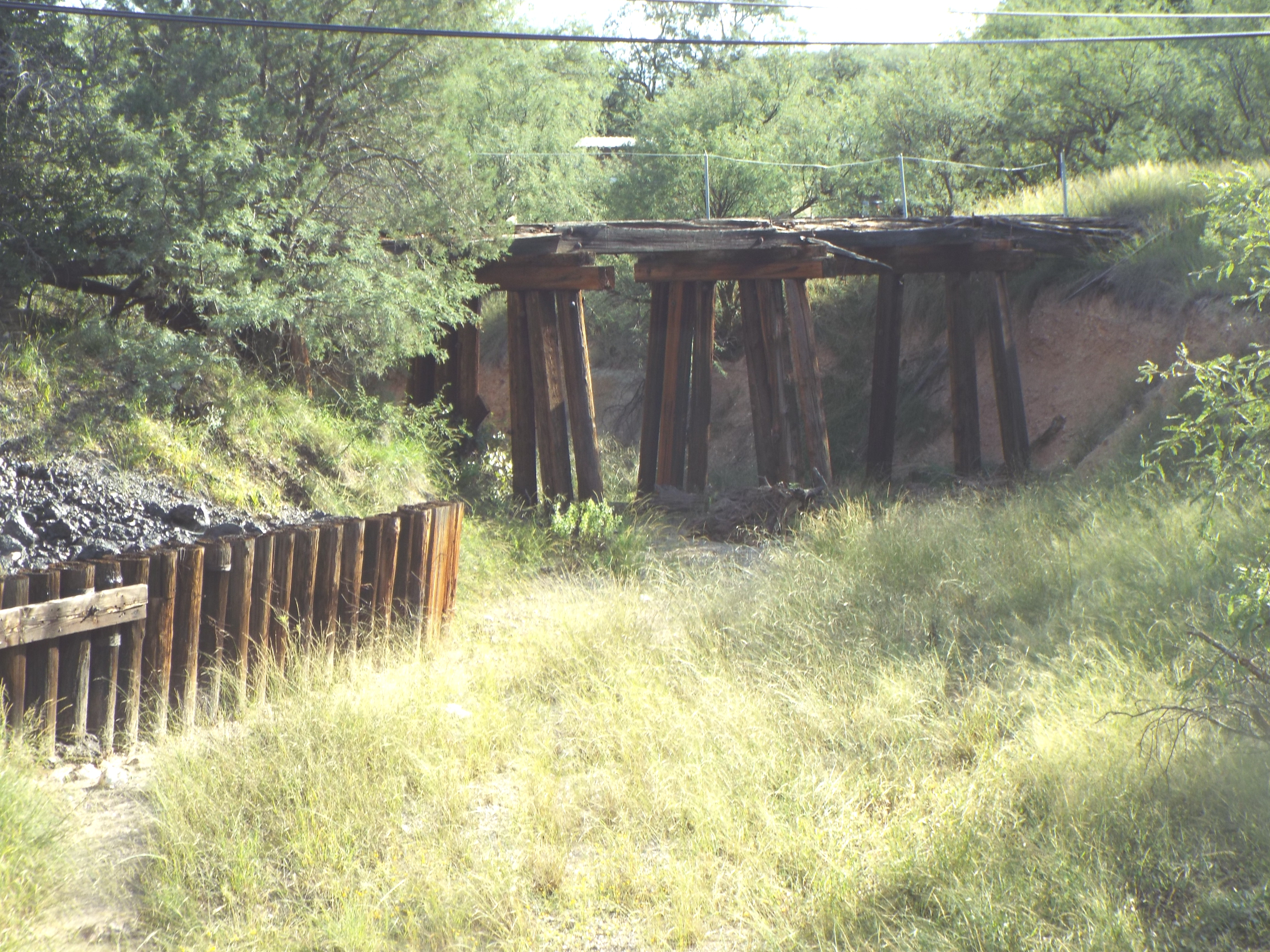
Ruins of the Fort Buchanan Bridge

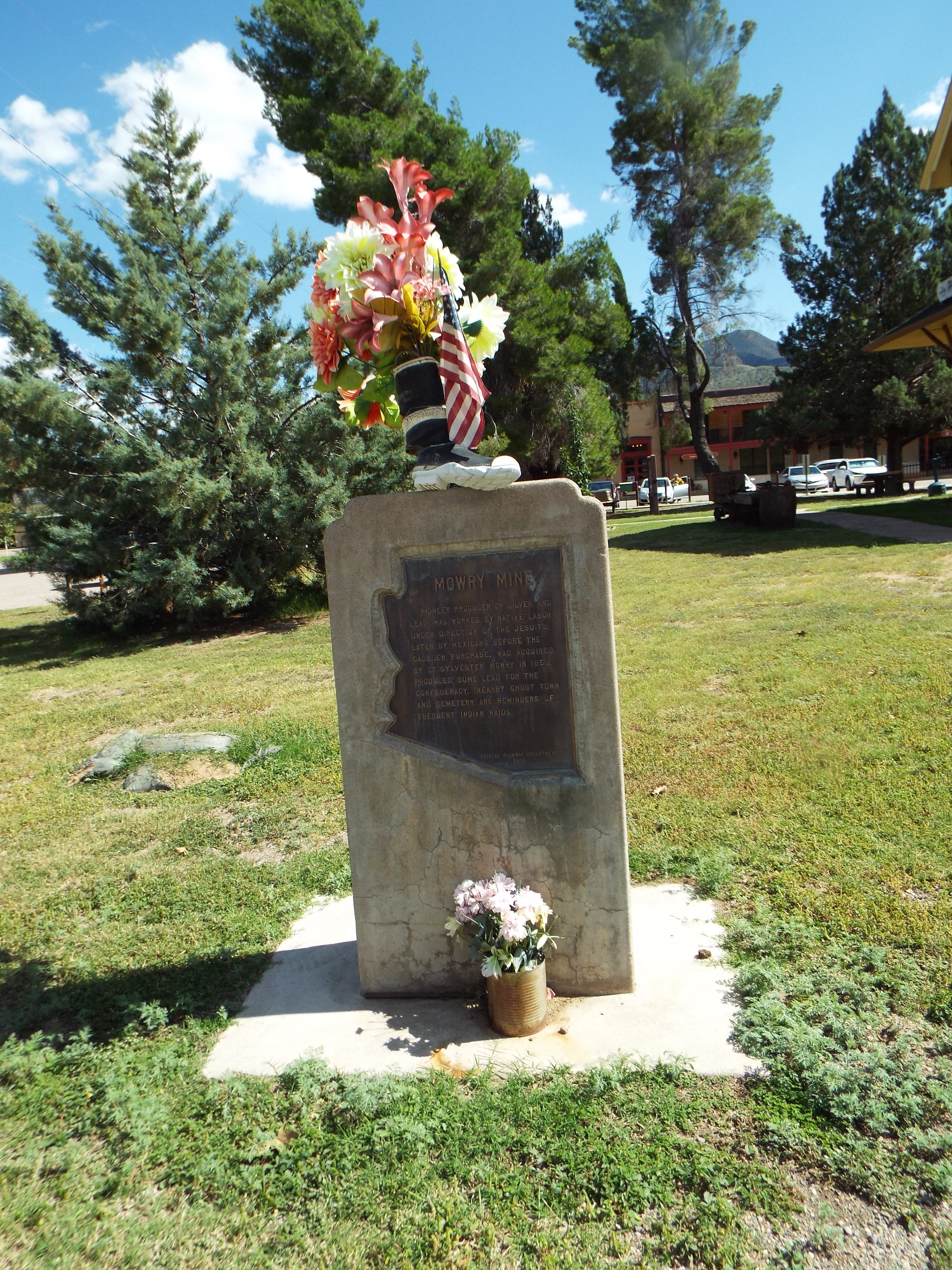
Mowry Mine Marker

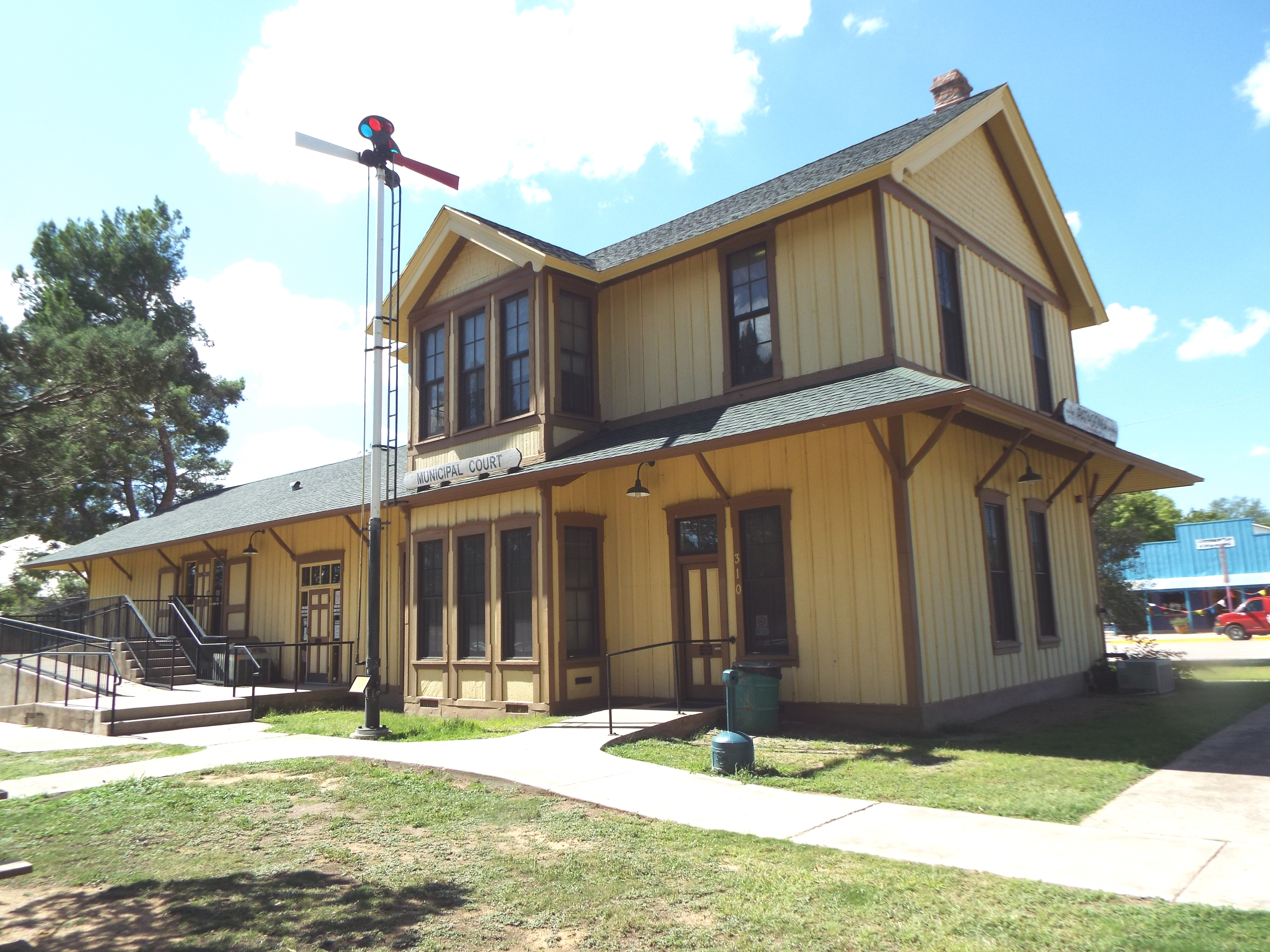
Patagonia Depot

This is a list which includes a photographic gallery, of some of the structures of historic significance in Patagonia, Arizona. Patagonia is a town in Santa Cruz County, Arizona which lies in a narrow valley between the Santa Rita Mountains to the north and the Patagonia Mountains to the south. Patagonia was a mining town and an important supply center for nearby mines and ranches.

== Brief history ==
The area where Patagonia is located provided the Anasazi, an early Native-American tribe, with plentiful hunting and fishing opportunities. Ruins of the ancient settlements and petroglyphs of the Anasazi have been found by archaeologists. The area was known as a Tohono O'odham ranchería, or seasonal village, called Sonoitac.

In 1539, Spanish explorer Fray Marcos de Niza entered the area near Lochiel on the Mexican border. He continued on his journey to Zuni Pueblo, New Mexico also known as the Seven Cities of Cibola. Marcos de Niza is credited with being the first European in what is now the State of Arizona. The main Native American tribes in the area at that time were the Sobaipuri and Papago (Tohono O'odham).

In 1692, Father Eusebio Francisco Kino came to the area as a missionary. His main objective was to convert the natives to Catholicism. The area became part of his Mission Los Santos Ángeles de Guevavi. By 1698, Father Kino encouraged his group to make their way up to Sonoita Creek. When they arrived in Sonoita Creek they encountered groups of indigenous people living along the area in which the creek was located. In the future that area would become known as Patagonia.

According to Gilbert Quiroga, president of the Patagonia Museum, Welsh miners that had come from Patagonia in South America came to this region. Patagonia in South America is a region encompassing the vast southernmost tip of South America, shared by Argentina and Chile, with the Andes Mountains as its dividing line. The mountains in the area of Arizona, which the Native Americans called Chihuahuillas, reminded them of those mountains in Patagonia, South America and as such they began calling them the Patagonia Mountains.

The mission period was ended in 1768 by a decree of Charles III of Spain. In 1821, the Mexican War of Independence between Mexico and Spain came to an end and the territory of New Spain, which included Arizona, was ceded to Mexico.

By the mid-1850s prospectors were mining the silver-rich mountains east of Sonoita. By the 1860s vast amounts of silver and lead were retrieved from the Patagonia Mountains each year. In 1854, the United States purchased the region from Mexico in what is known as the Gadsden Purchase. Americans of European descent from the East Coast of the United States began to arrive in the area. They were protected from the constant attacks of the Apaches by the United States Military. However, The majority of the troops were withdrawn from the area upon the outbreak of the American Civil War. Fort Buchanan, a small garrison established in 1856 near Sonoita, was overrun by the Apaches. Thus, the miners, ranchers and farmers in the region were without protection from the Apaches and many of them moved to other areas.

The Civil War between the North (the Union) and the South (the Confederacy) ended in 1865. In 1867, the United States Army established a military post called Camp Crittenden close to Sonoita. The camp, which later was renamed Fort Crittenden, was involved in a campaign against the Apache with the intention of protecting the American pioneers in the area. The miners, ranchers and farmers returned to the area once more.

Rollin Rice Richardson, a veteran of the Civil War, made a fortune in mining. In 1896, Rollin hired J.C. Green, a surveyor from Tucson, to plot the settlement. As a result, he founded the town that same year and in 1899, he applied to open a post office. Richardson wanted the town to be named "Rollin" in his honor, however the residents of the area opposed. They petitioned the United States Post Master General to name the town Patagonia after the nearby mountain. Patagonia was recognized as the official name of the town in 1900 by the United States Postal Office Department in Washington, D.C.

That same year, a two-story railroad depot was built and Patagonia became the commercial center of the mining district in the Santa Cruz County. The ranching and cattle industry also played an important role in the economy of Patagonia. The arrival of the New Mexico and Arizona Railroad to Patagonia gave the ranchers and miners a new outlet for their products and access to manufactured goods.

By 1917, Patagonia had running water, an Opera House, three hotels, a schoolhouse, two parks and several stores and saloons. Richardson practically ruled the town until his death in 1923. Patagonia was formally incorporated in 1948.

== Patagonia Museum ==
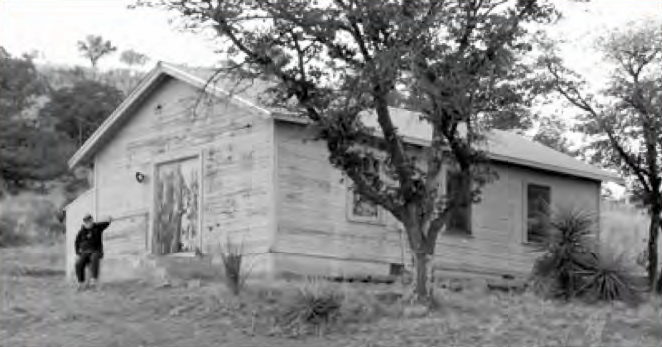
The Little Outfit Schoolhouse

The Patagonia Museum, located in the 1914 Patagonia Grammar School on 100 School Street, is a nonprofit organization dedicated to collecting and preserving the culture and history of eastern Santa Cruz County.

There are two properties listed in the National Register of Historic Places, they are: Cady Hall and The Little Outfit Schoolhouse.

The Little Outfit Schoolhouse is a ranch school that was built in 1940 on the Little Outfit Ranch in the San Rafael Valley. It was listed in the National Register of Historic Places on January 8, 2009, reference: #08001275.

== Properties pictured ==
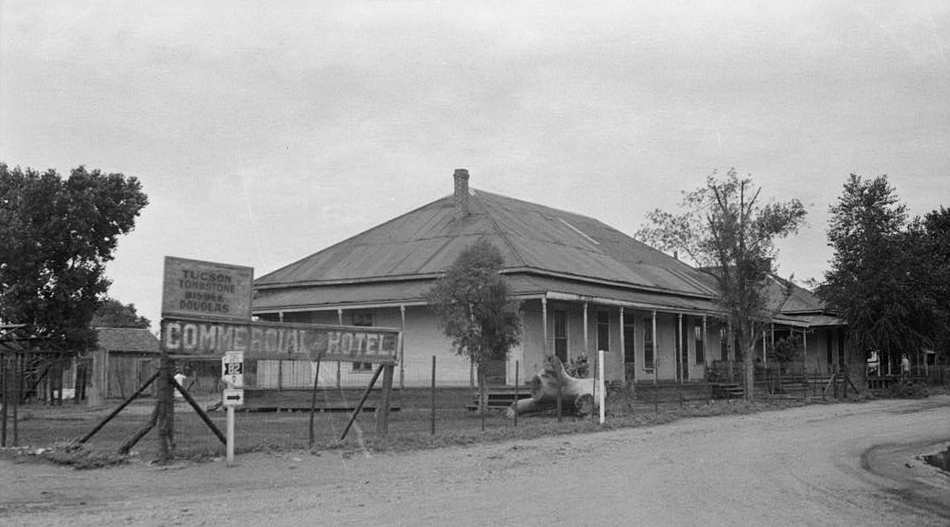
Patagonia Hotel (now the Cady Hall) in 1937.

The following is a list of the structures which are pictured.

- The Old Miners House – built in 1905 and located at 260 Naugle Ave. It now houses Grayce's Gift Shop.
- The Marshals Office – built in 1898 and located at 287 McKeown Ave.
- The Patagonia Lumber Company – built in 1915 and located at 295 McKeown Ave. The building now houses a business called Pilates Patagonia.
- The Stage Stop Inn – built in 1960 and located at 303 McKeown Avenue
- The Rollin Rice Richardson House – built in 1890 and located 371 at McKeown Ave.
- The Mesquite Grove Gallery – built in 1900 and located at 375 McKeown Ave.
- The Patagonia Train Depot – built in 1900 and located at 310 McKeown Avenue
- The Patio Carolina – an adobe two-story building built in 1901 and located on 289 Duquesne Avenue.
- Cady Hall formerly the Patagonia Hotel – built between 1901–1912 and located at 346 Duquesne Ave. The building now houses the Patagonia Library. The structure was listed in the National Register of Historic Places on December 2, 1992, reference: #92001635
- The Duquesne Bed and Breakfast – built in 1898 to house the railroad workers and miners. It was renamed "The Duquesne House Inn & Gardens" and is located at 357 Duquesne Ave
- Lopez Pool Hall – built in 1940 and located on Duquesne Avenue (across the street of the Duquesne Bed and Breakfast)
- The Camel Parts Bed & Breakfast – built in 1901 and located on Duquesne Avenue next to Lopez Pool Hall.
- Abandoned adobe building – built in the late 1800s and located on Duquesne Avenue.
Historic Structures

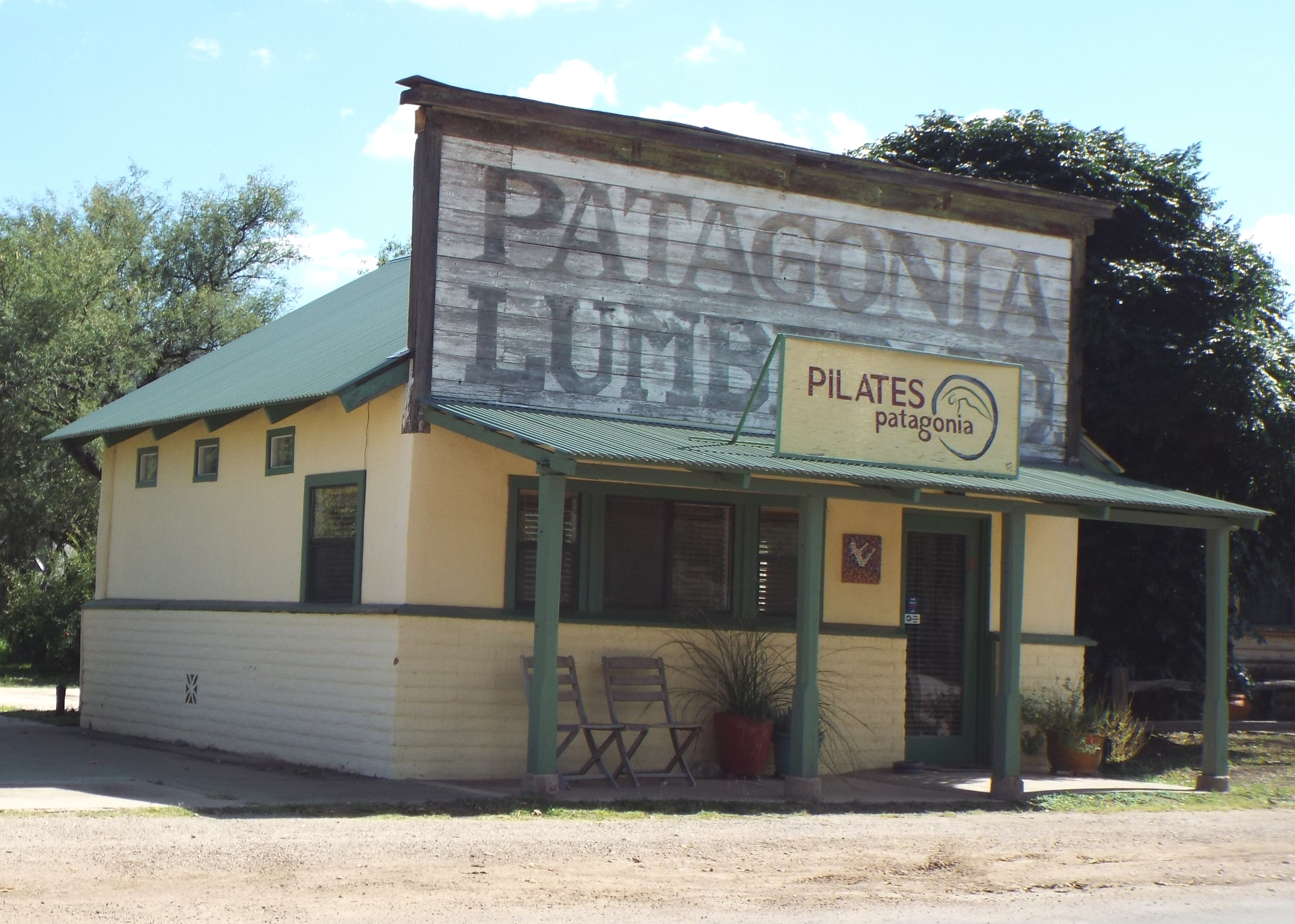
Patagonia Lumber Company

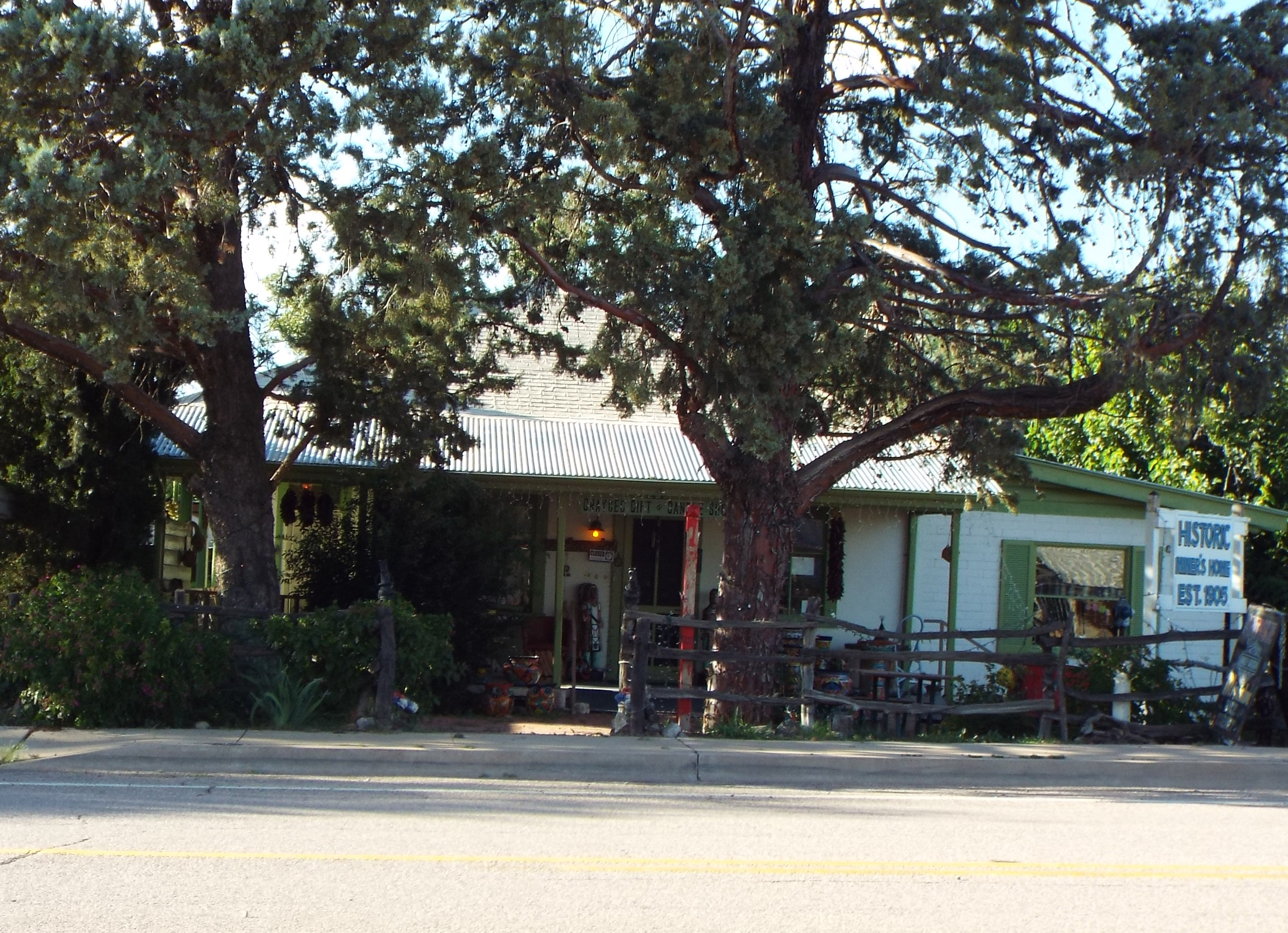
Old Miners House

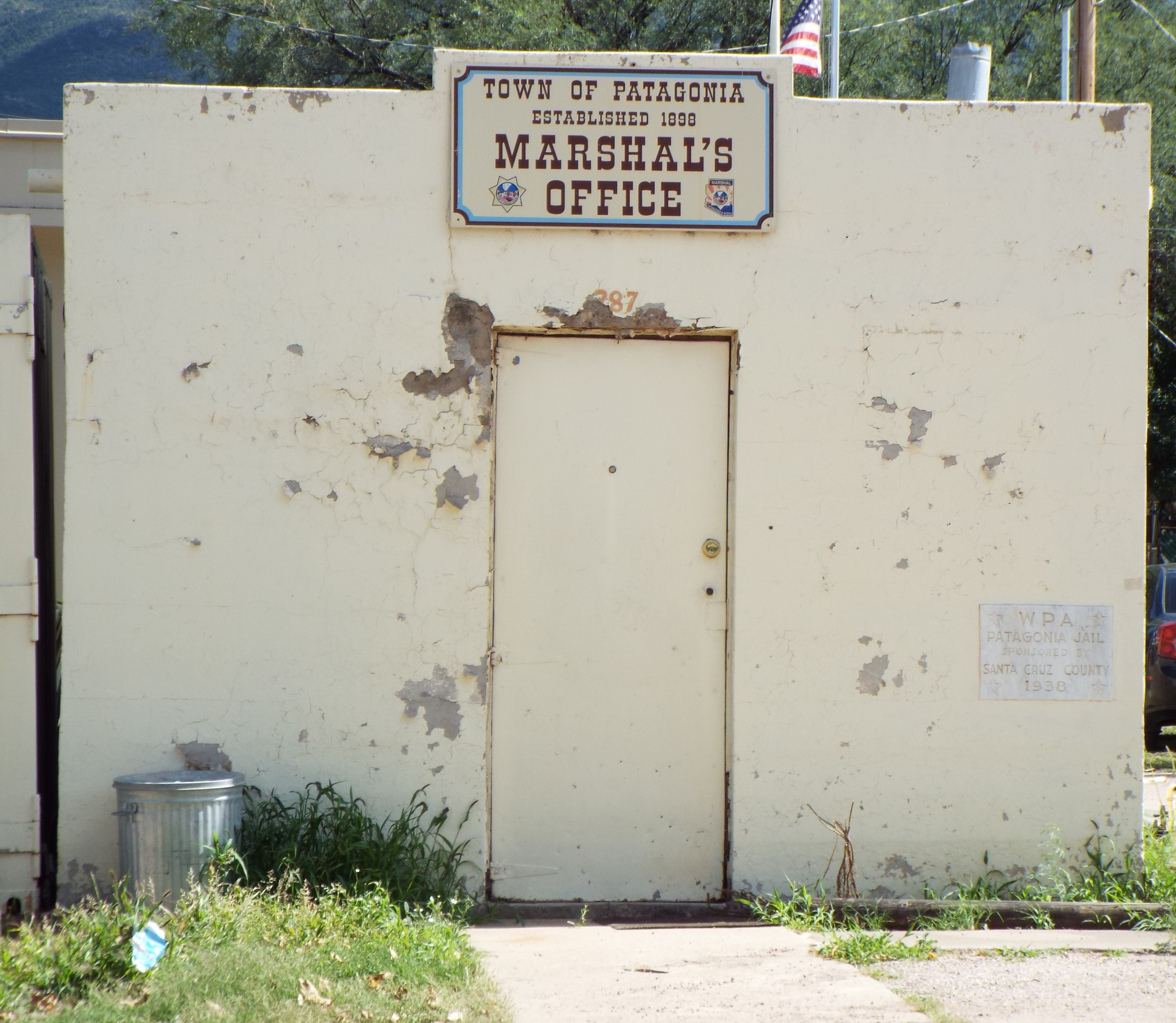
Marshals Office

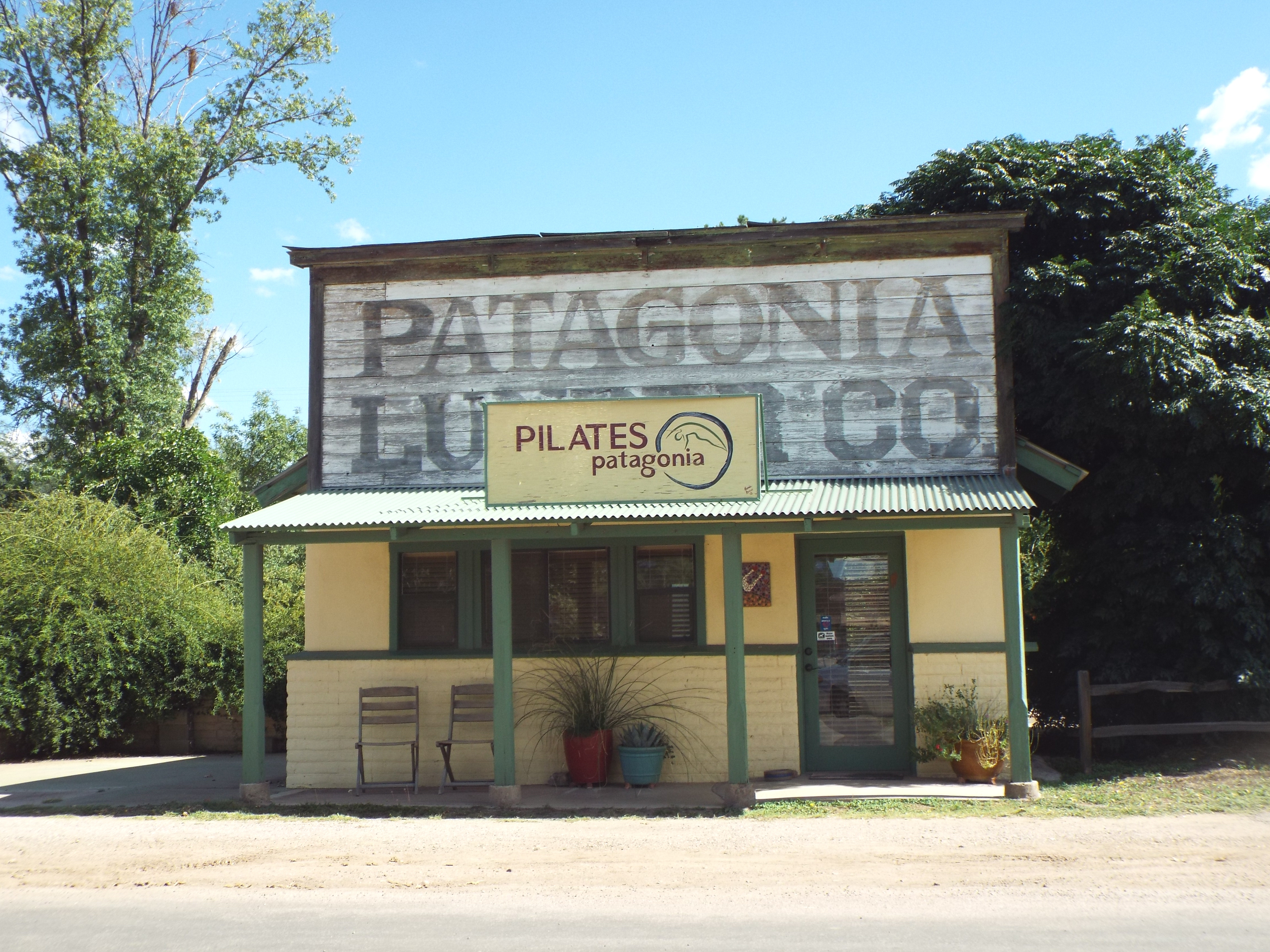
Patagonia Lumber Company

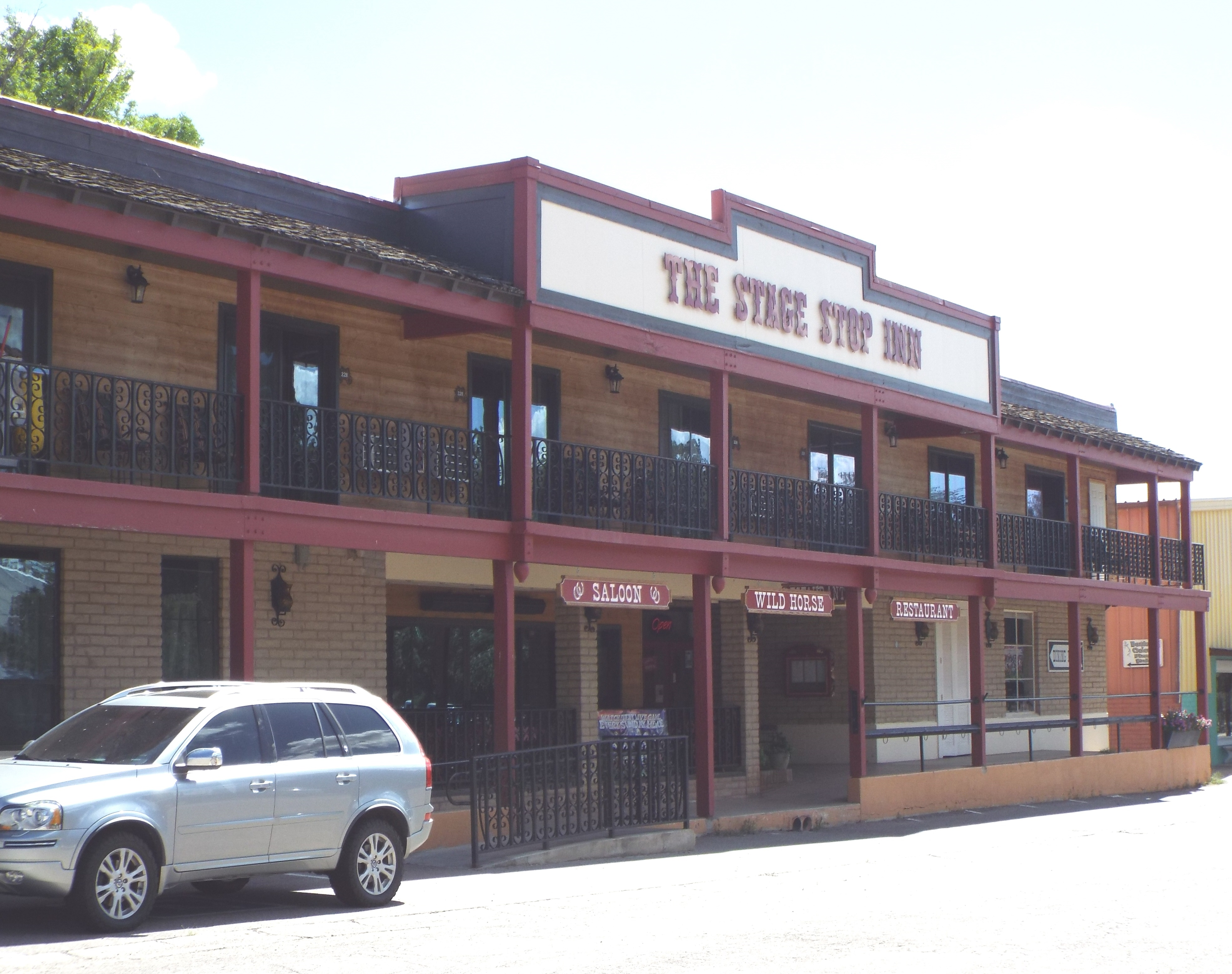
Stage Stop Inn

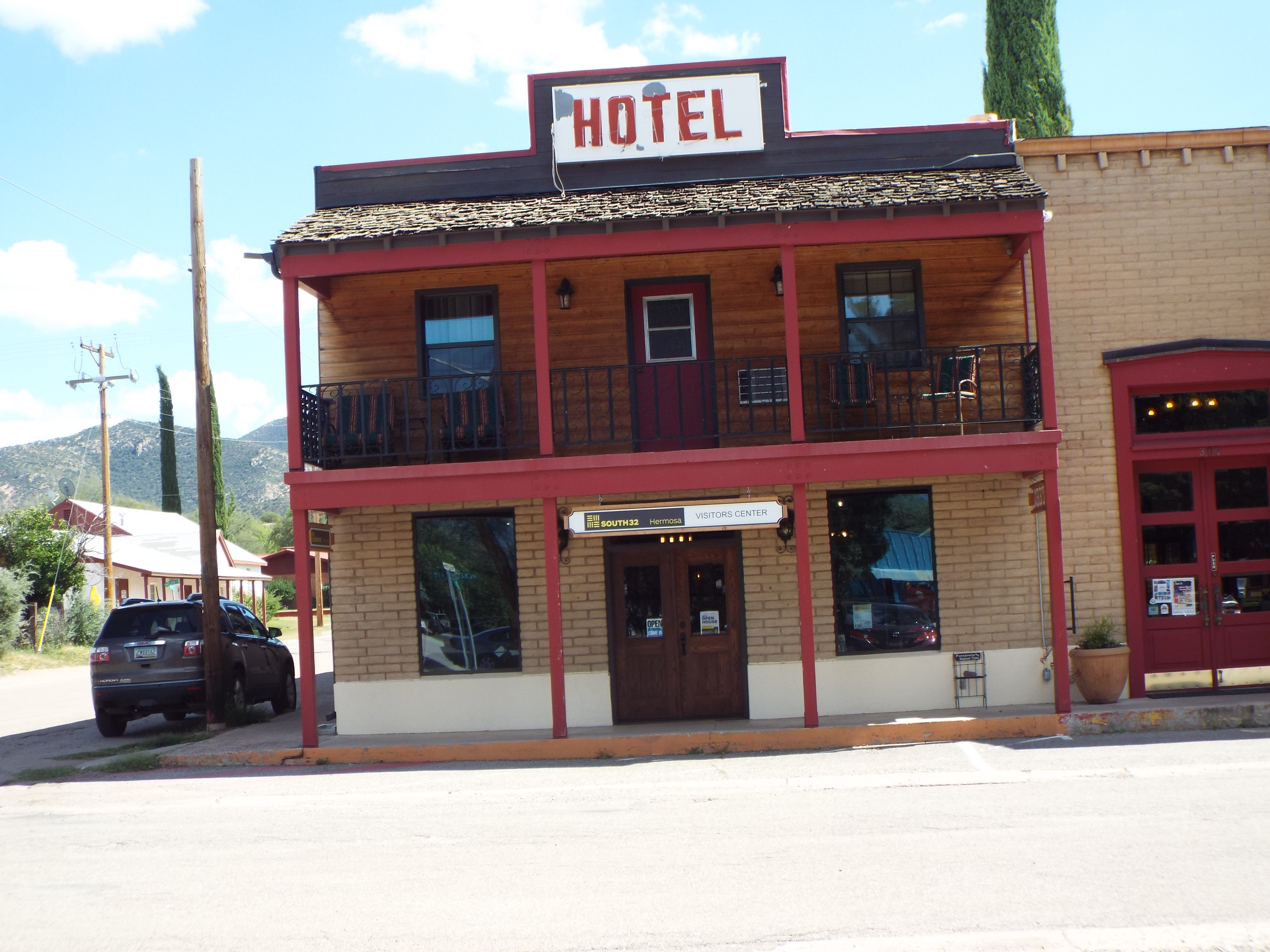
Hotel

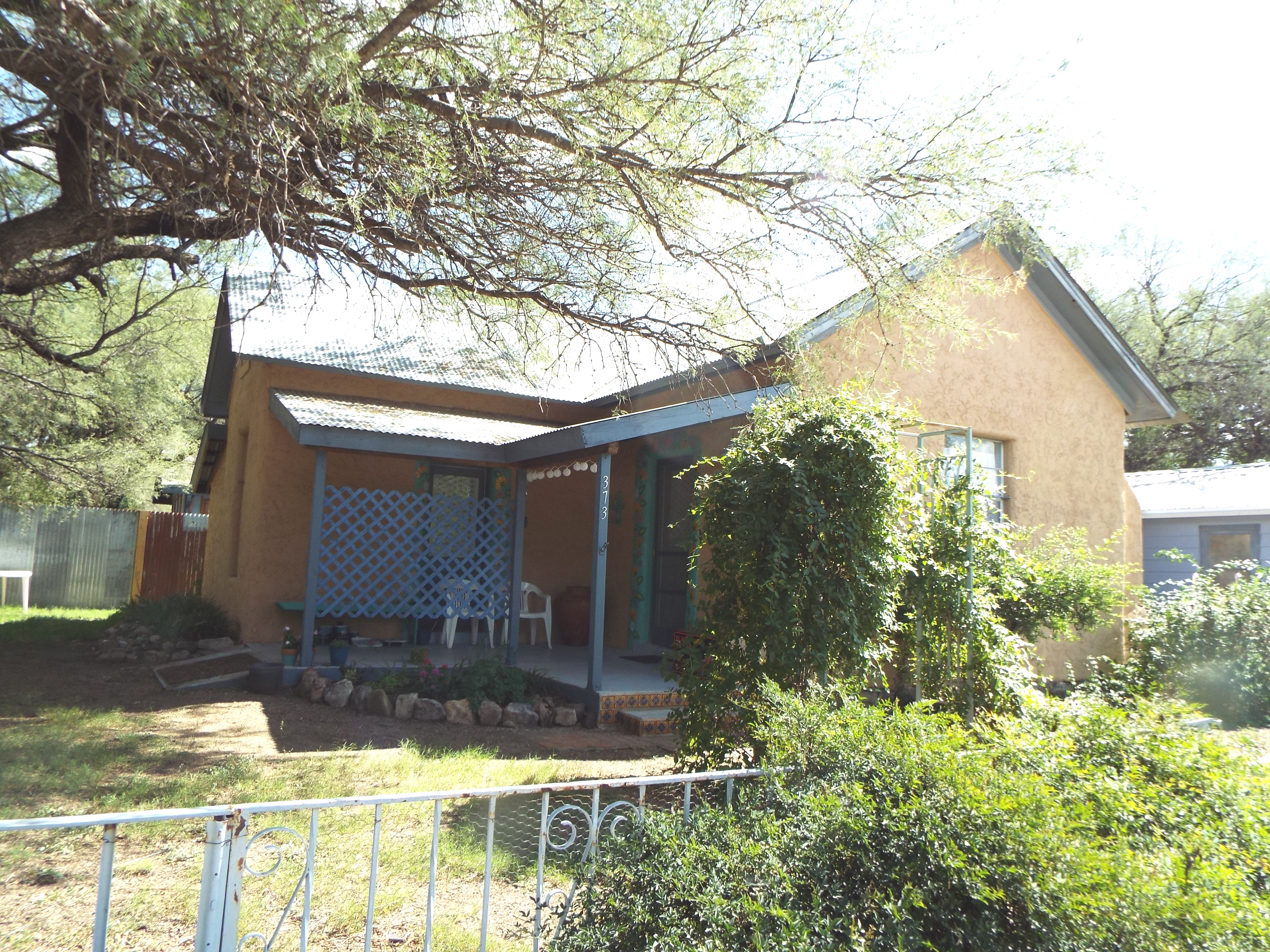
Rollin Rice Richardson House

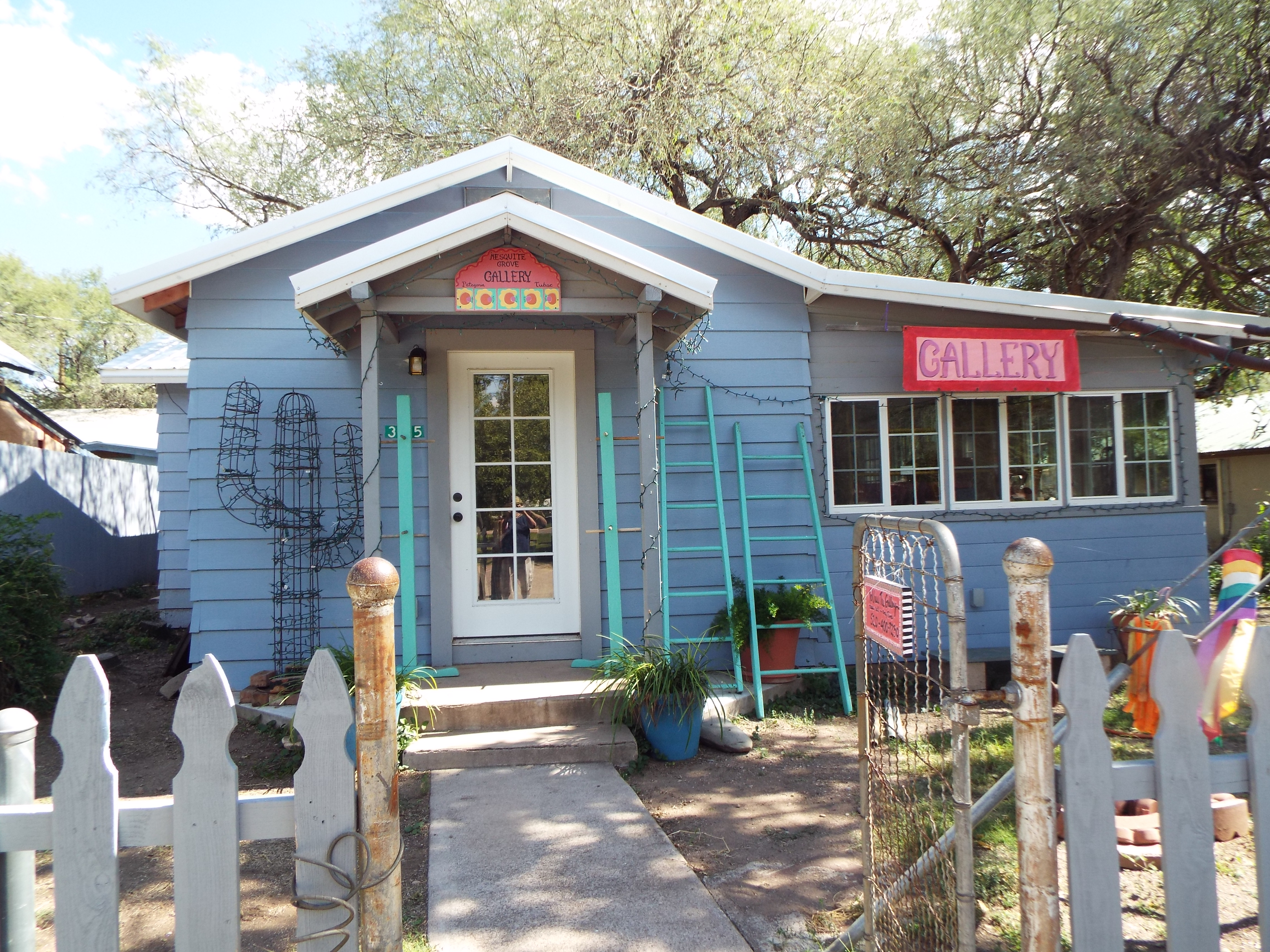
Mesquite Gallery

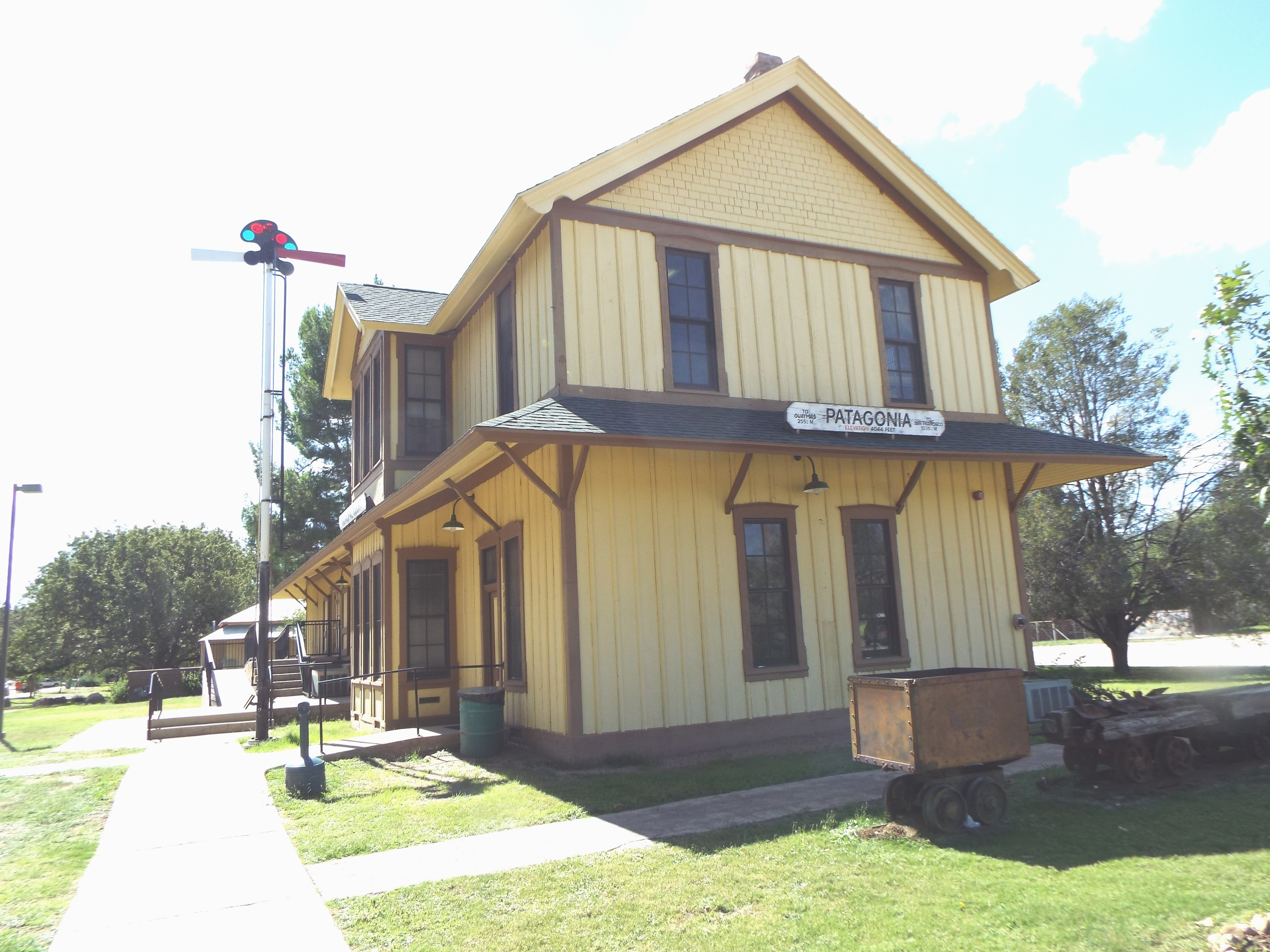
Patagonia Depot

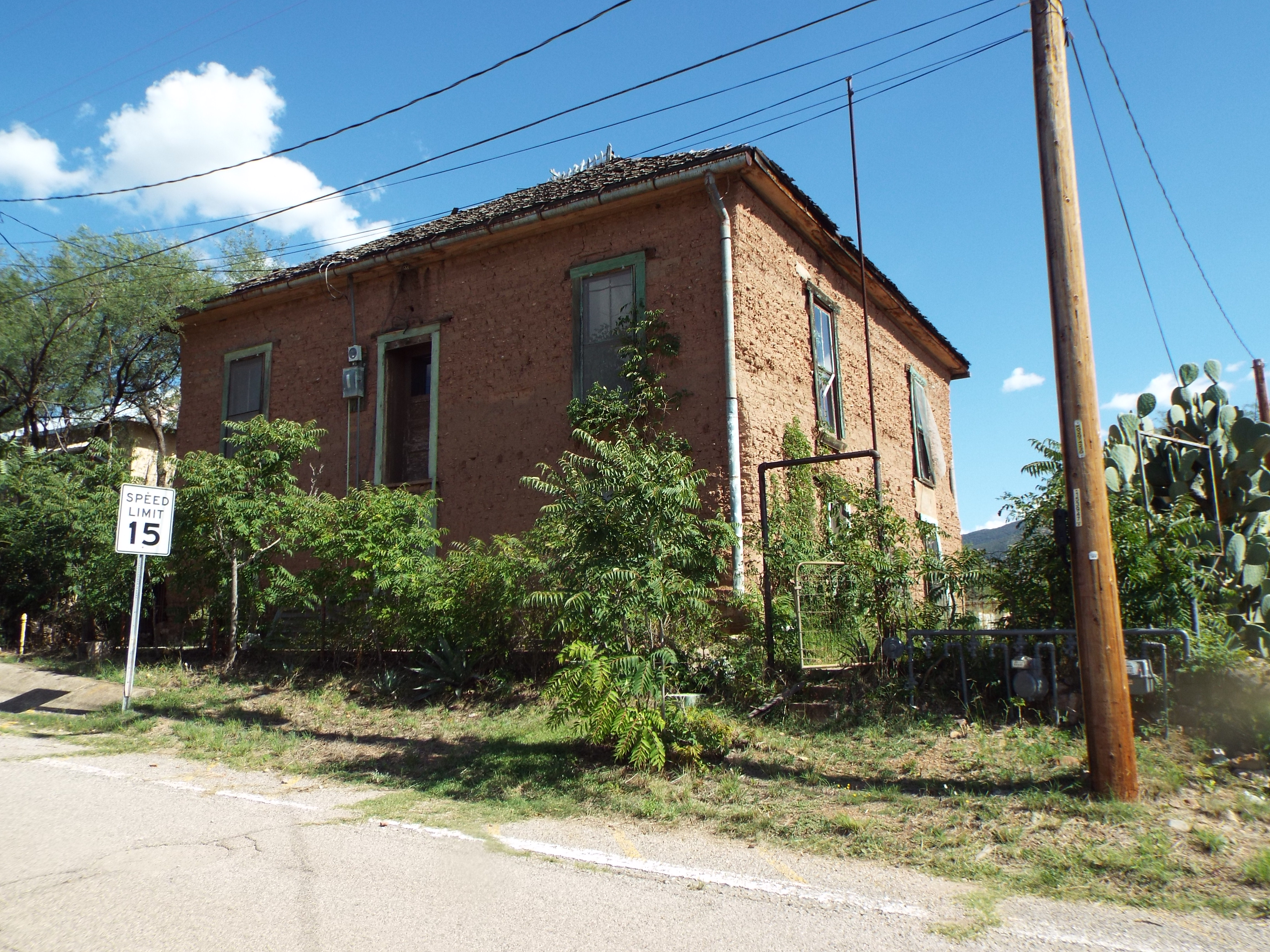
Adobe Patio Carolina building

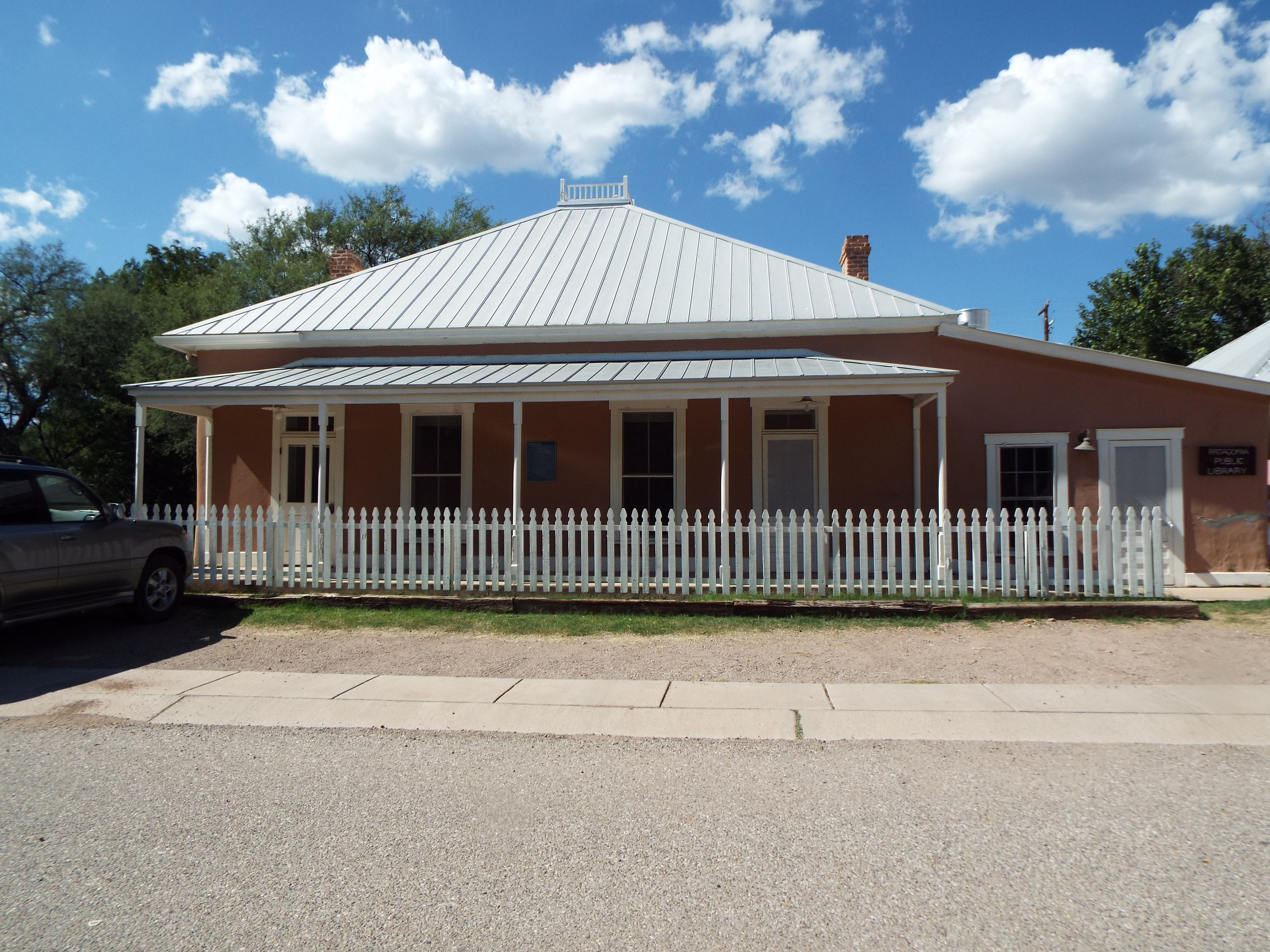
Cady Hall

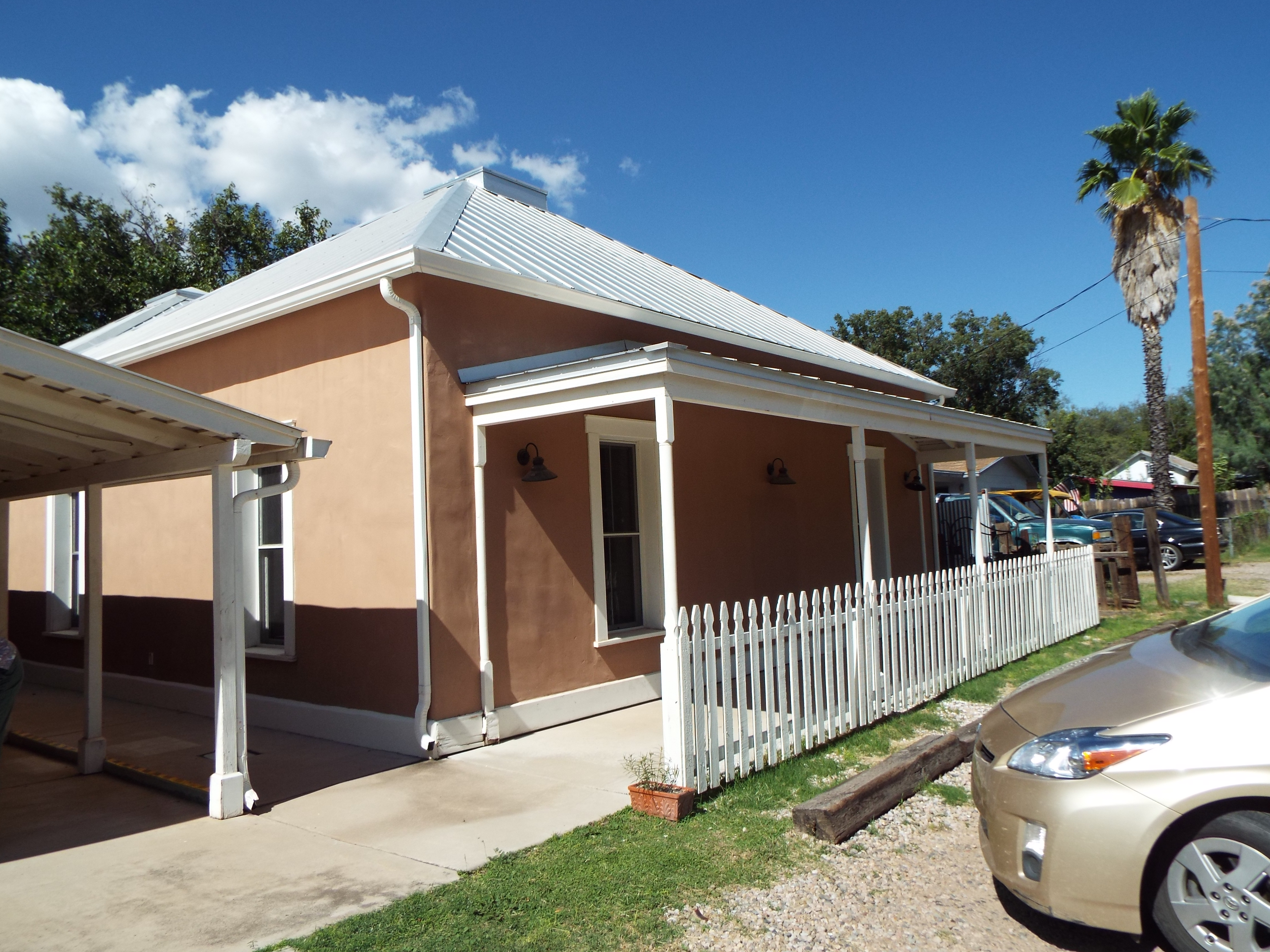
The Duquesne Bed and Breakfast

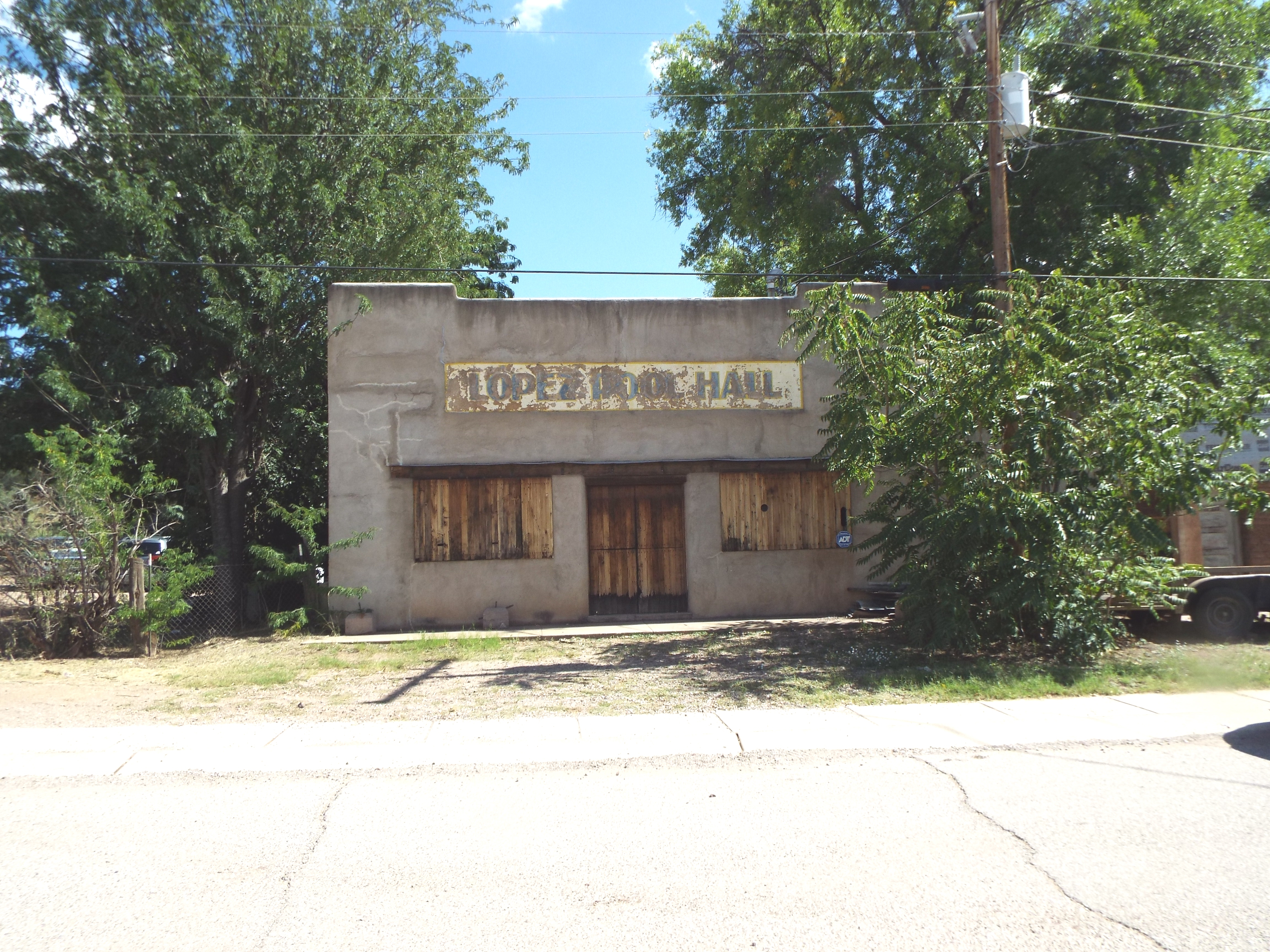
Lopez Pool Hall

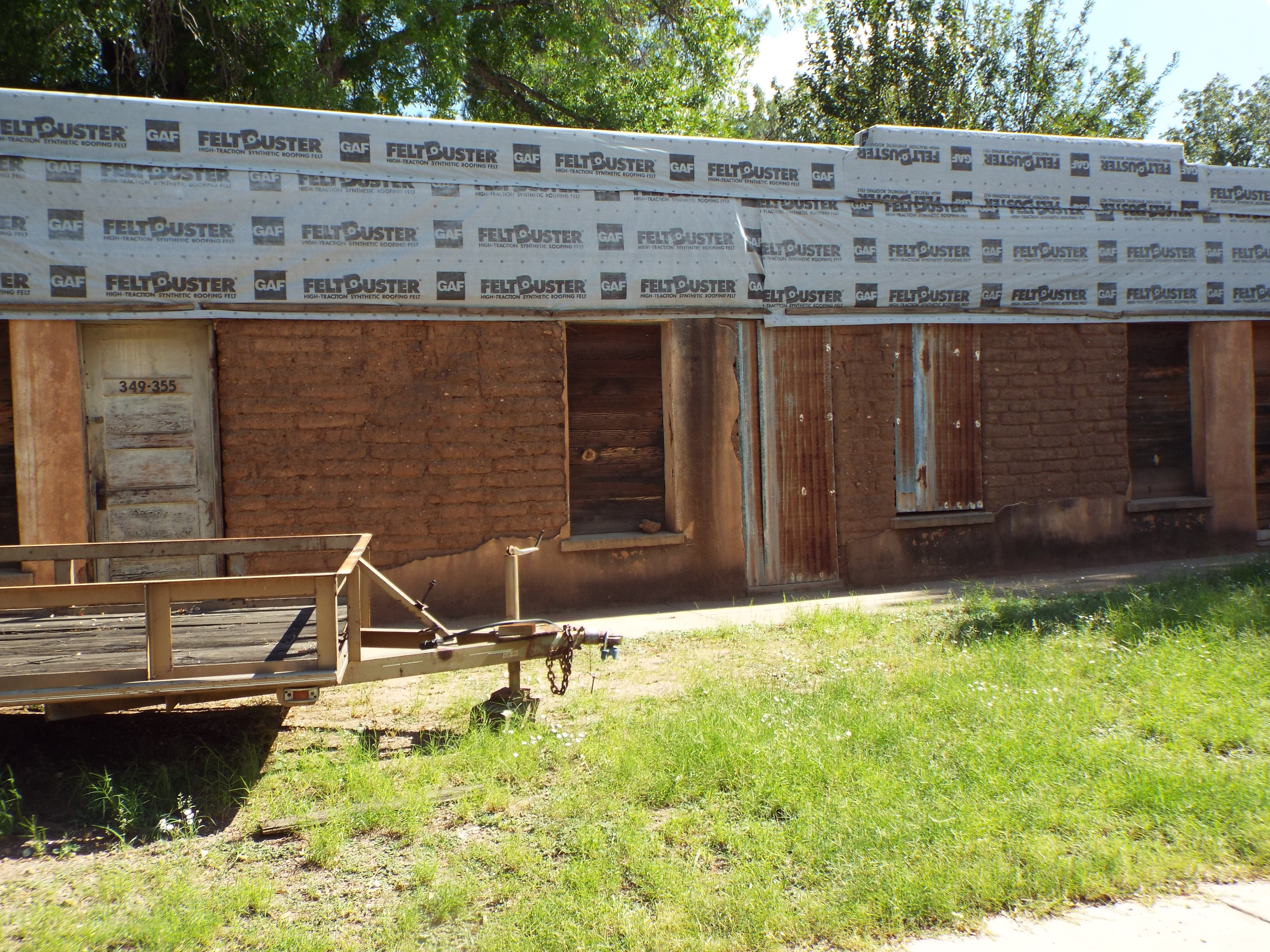
Camel Parts Bed & Breakfast Building

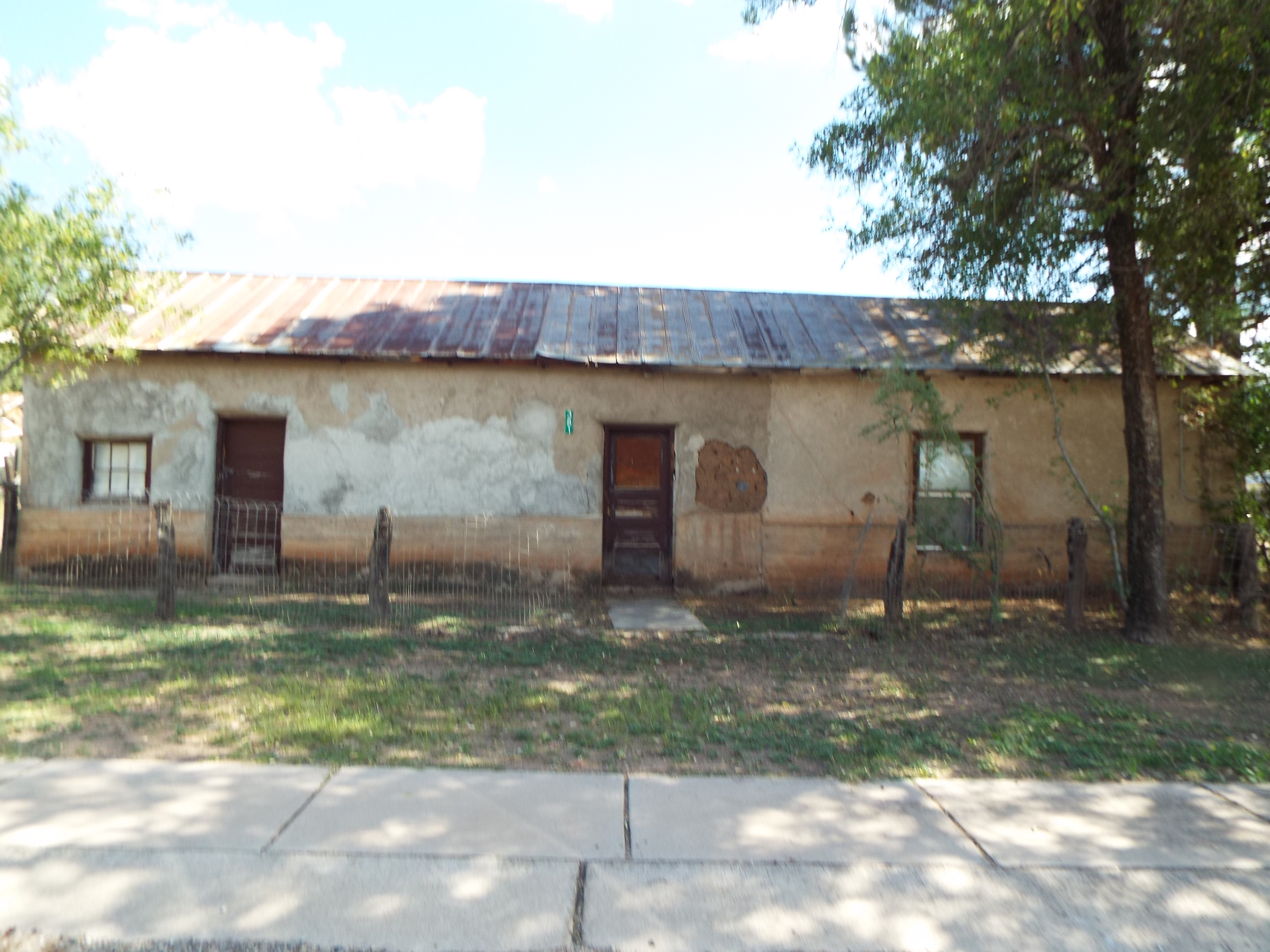
Abandoned Adobe Building

== Houses of religious worship ==
- La Mision de San Miguel built in 1915 and located at 335 McKeown Ave
- The Patagonia Community Church built in 1922 by volunteers using hand-poured concrete. It is located at 387 McKeown Ave,
Historic Houses of religious worship

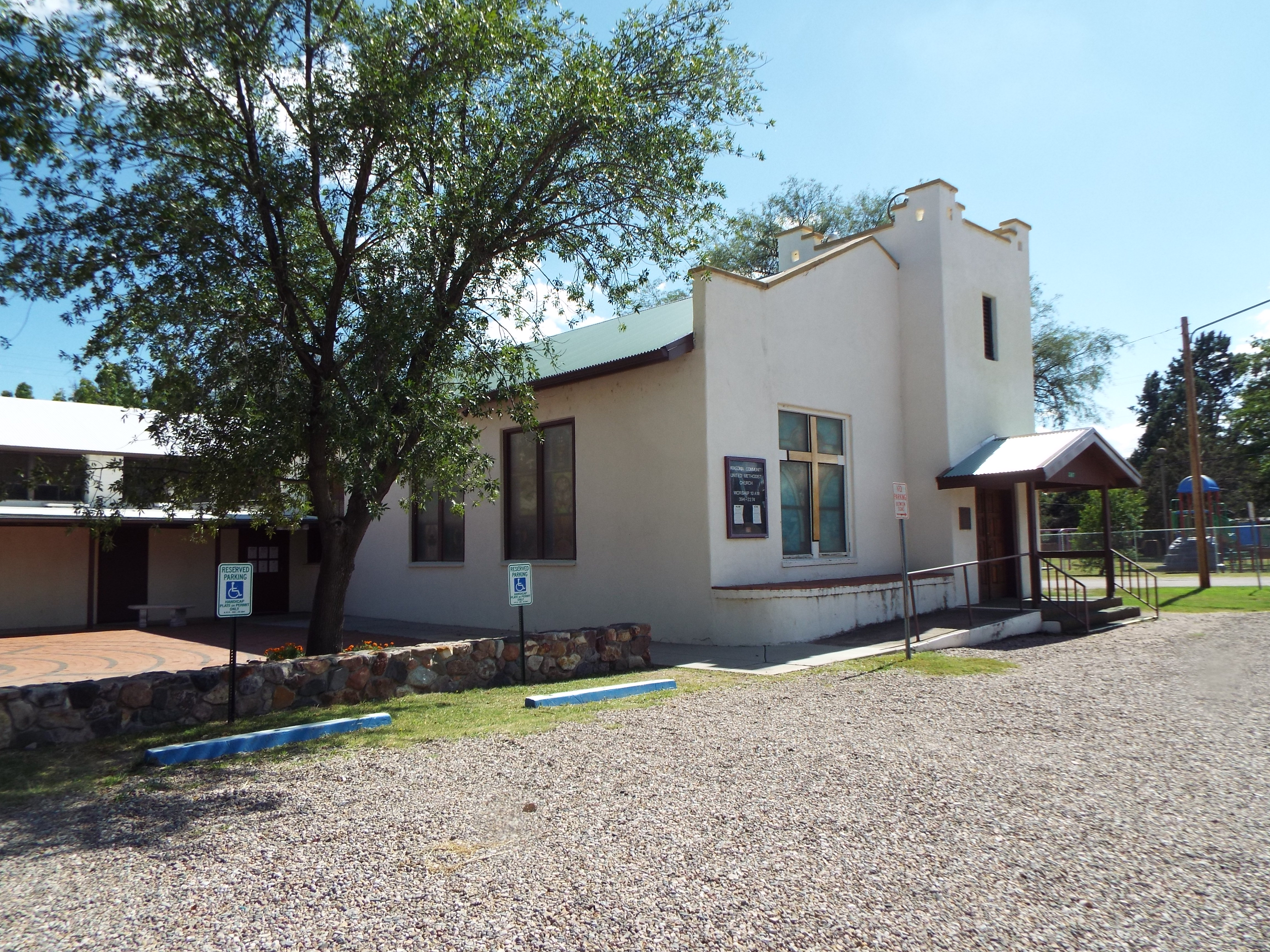
Patagonia Community Church

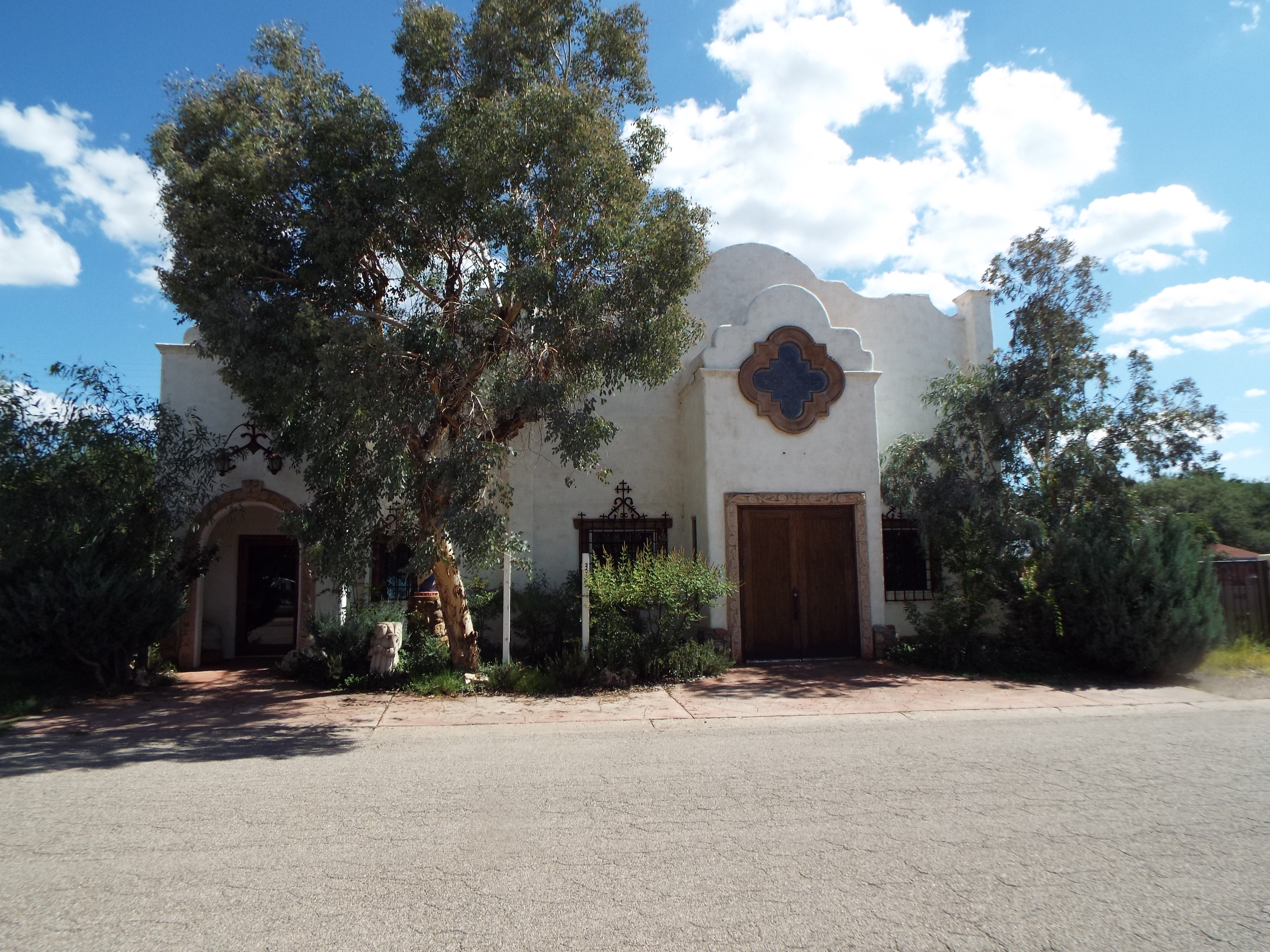
La Mision de San Miguel Church

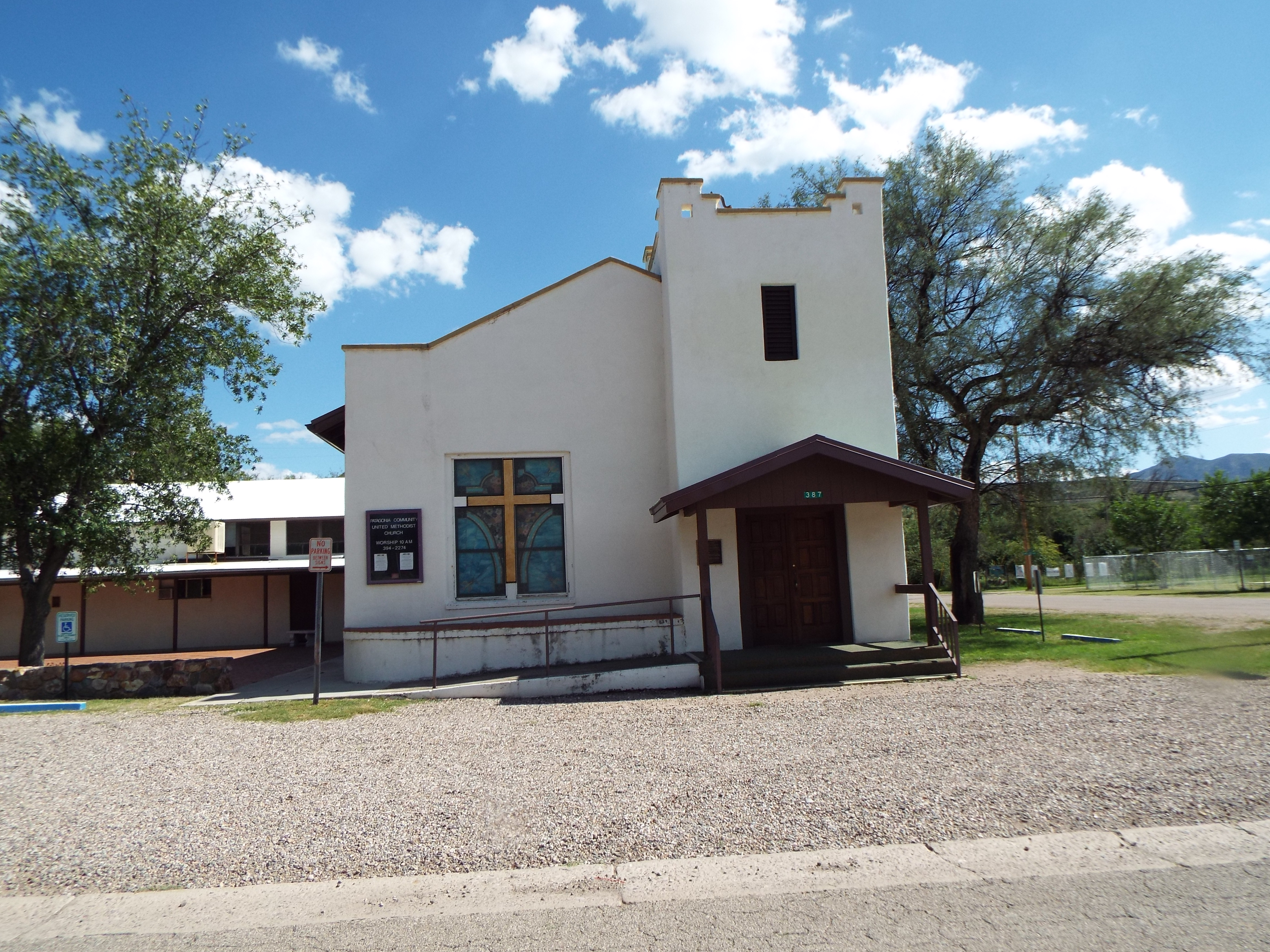
Patagonia Community Church

== Historic school ==
The Patagonia Elementary School was built in 1914 and is located at 100 School Street. It now houses the Patagonia Museum. There are various exhibits in the museum. Among the exhibits is a tree stump which once belonged to the town's jail tree. Prisoners were chained to the tree whenever the town's jail cell was overcrowded.

Patagonia Elementary School

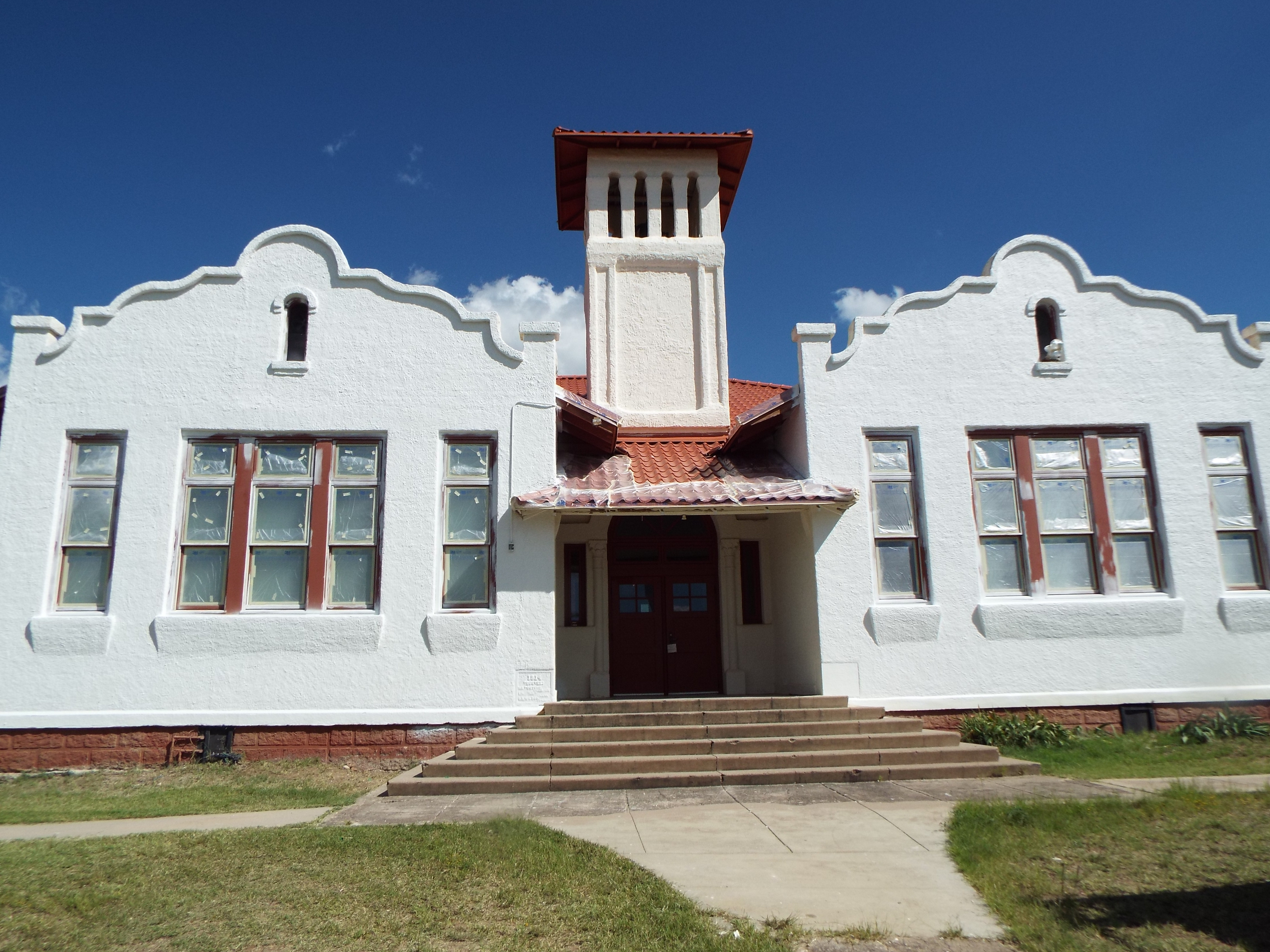
Patagonia Elementary School

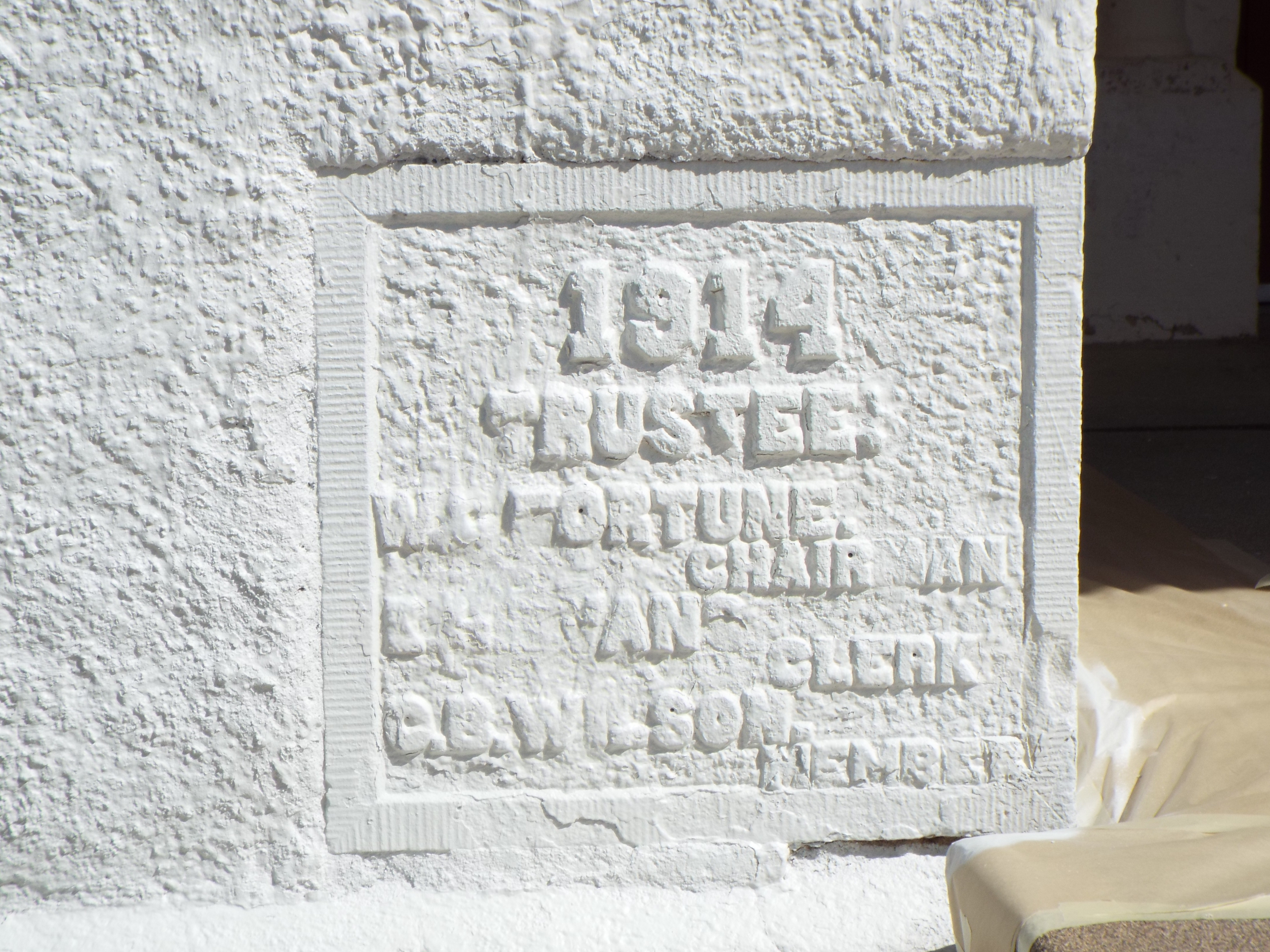
Patagonia Elementary School corner stone

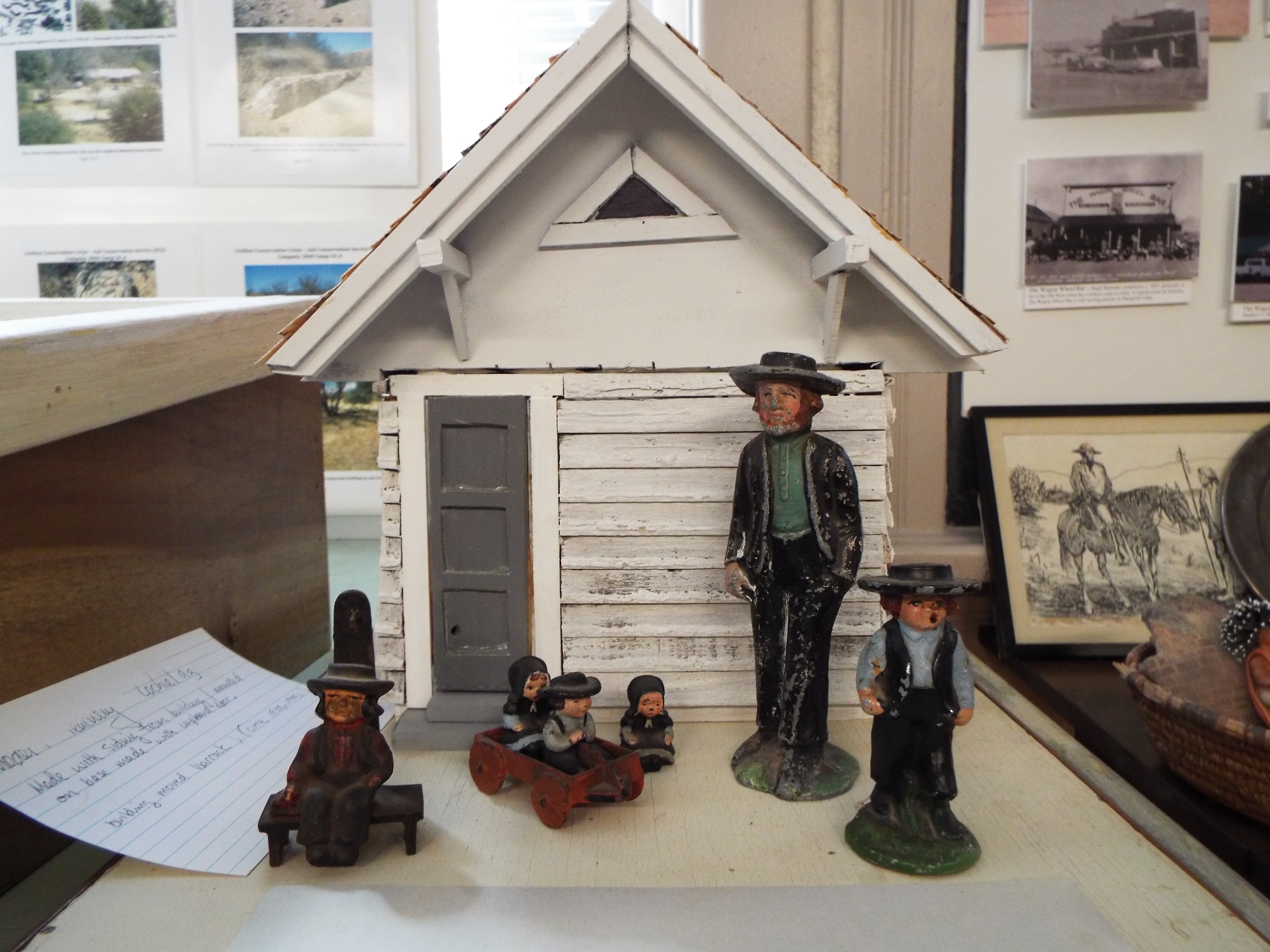
Museum exhibit

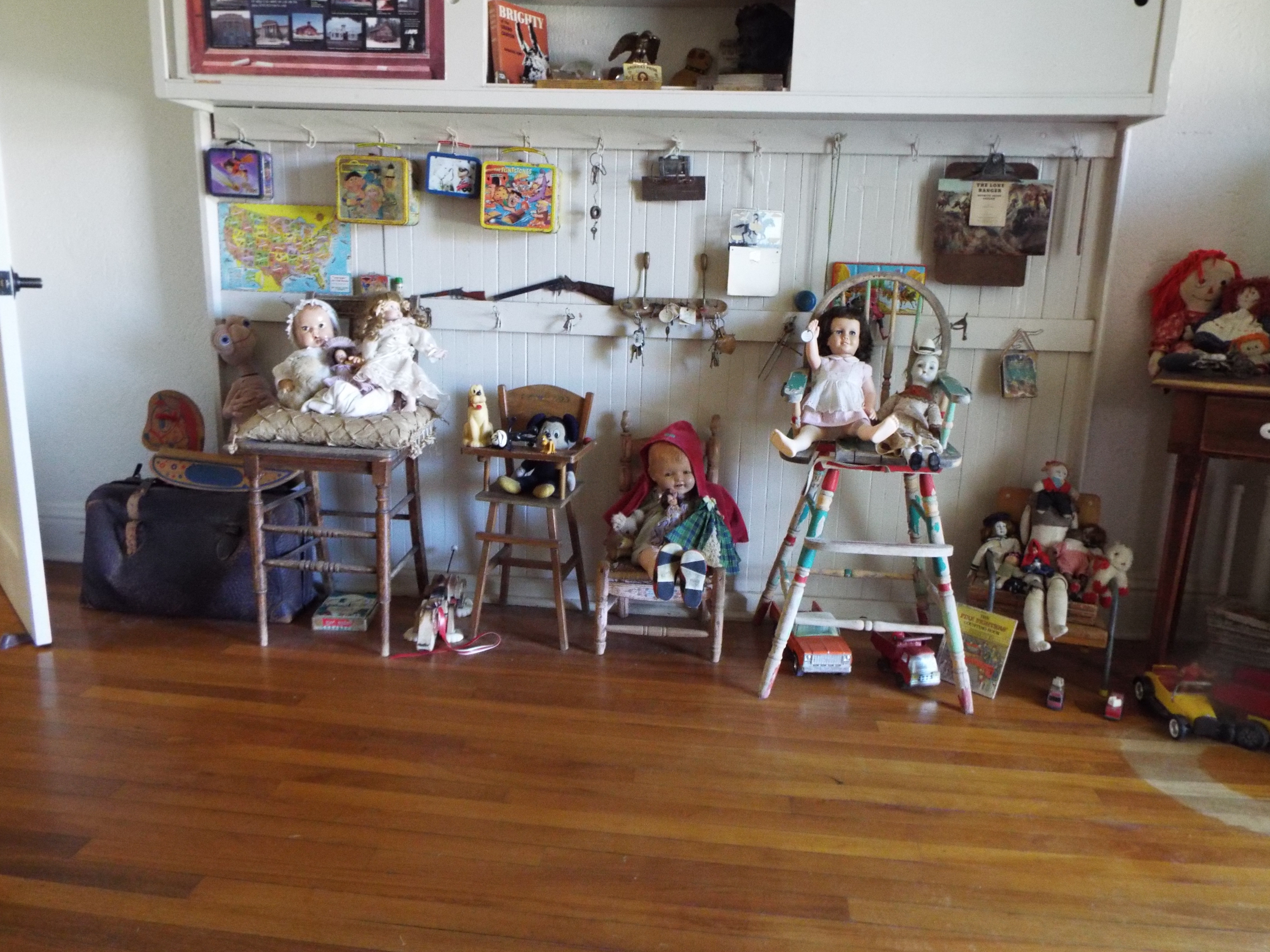
Museum toy exhibit

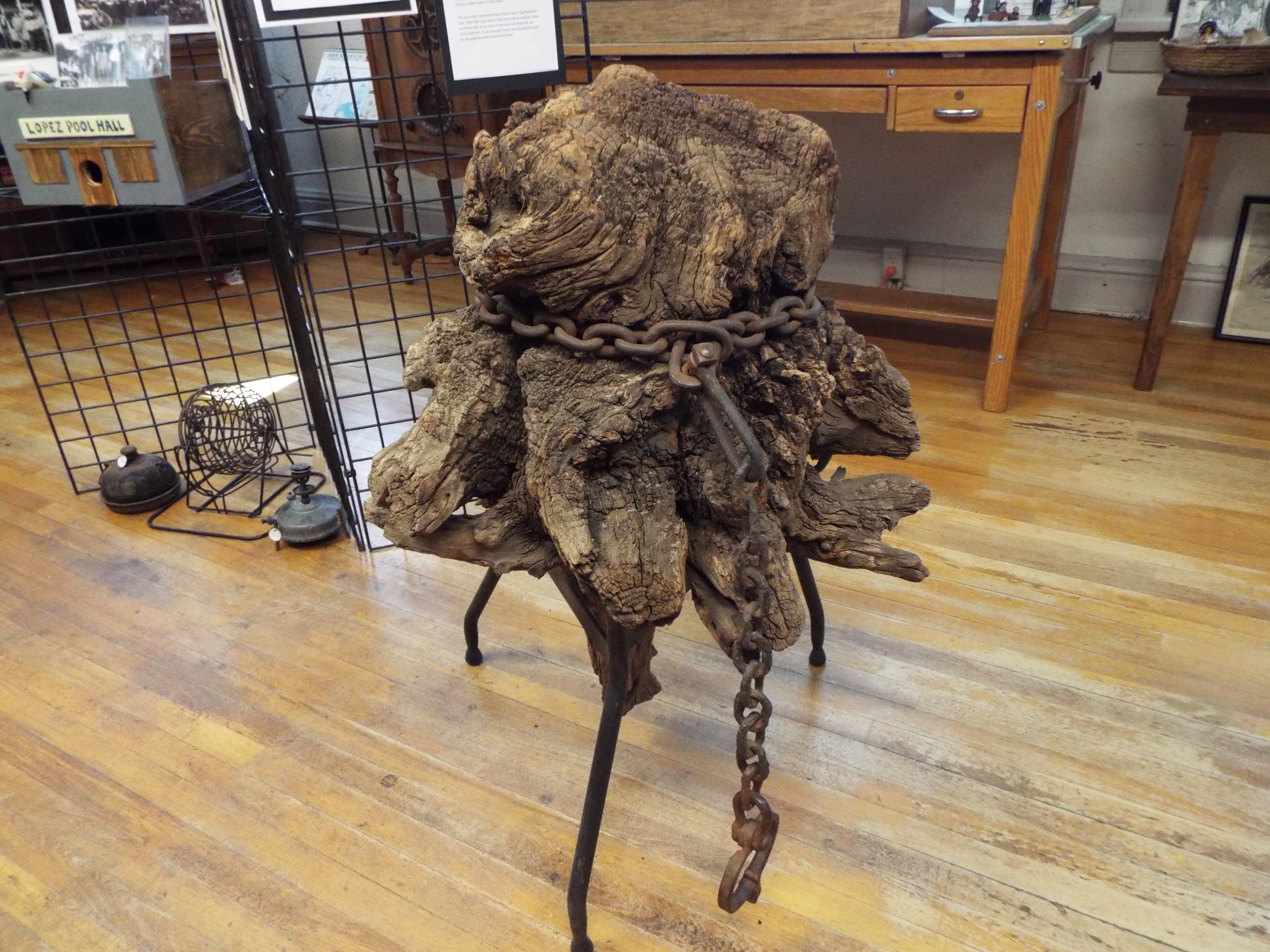
Jail Tree stump and chain

== See also ==
- National Register of Historic Places listings in Santa Cruz County, Arizona
