= Cady Hall =

Historic building in Patagonia, Arizona, US

- U.S. National Register of Historic Places
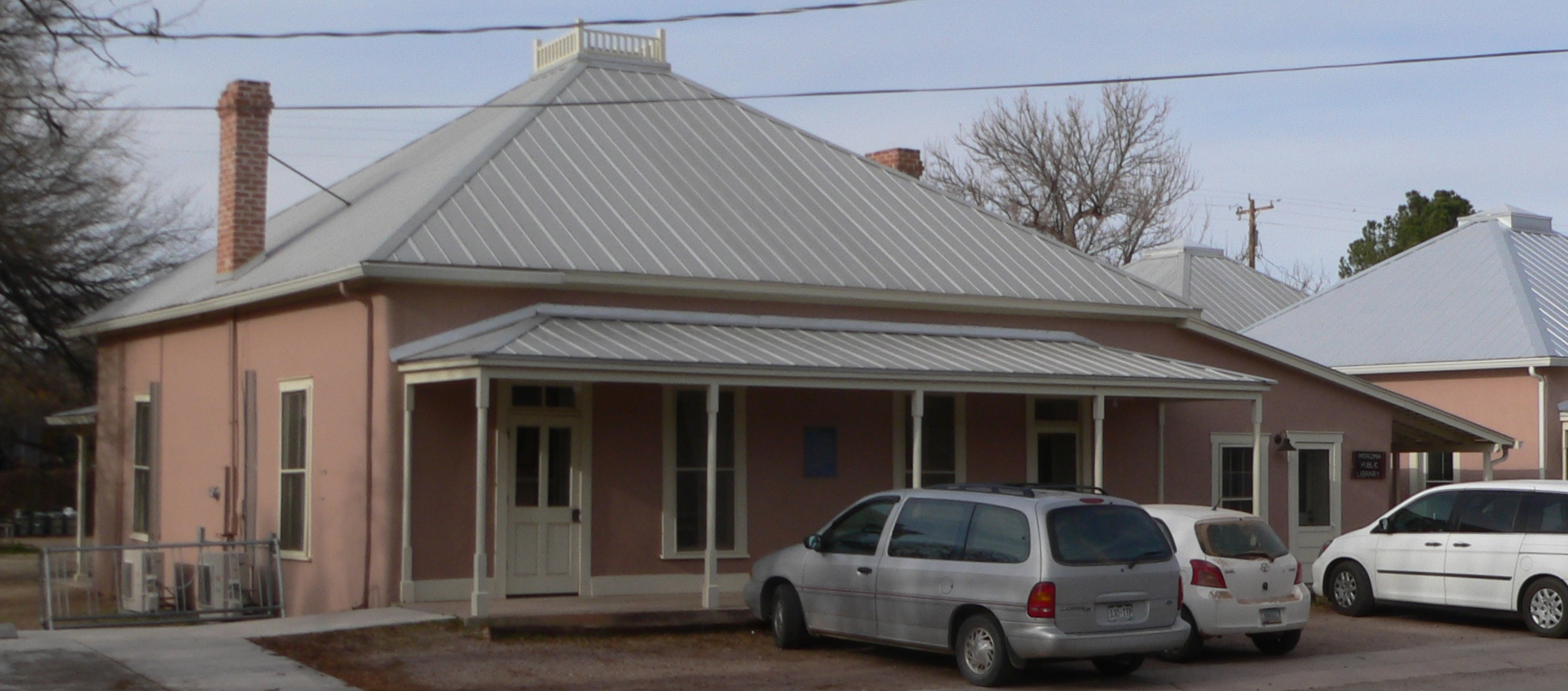

- Location within Arizona Location within the United States
- Location: 346 Duquesne St., Patagonia, Arizona
- Coordinates: 31°32′19″N 110°45′13″W
- Area: 0.5 acres (0.20 ha)
- Built: 1901
- Built by: John H. Cady
- Architectural style: Colonial Revival, Vernacular Adobe
- NRHP reference No.: 92001635
- Added to NRHP: December 2, 1992

Cady Hall is a Spanish Colonial Revival building in Patagonia, Arizona. The building was constructed in 1901 as the Patagonia Hotel by local businessman John Cady (1846–1927). During the twentieth century it was used as a hotel, a boarding house, a church, a library and a social hall. The L-shaped one-story plastered adobe building has a pyramidal roof over the main section and a gable room over the hotel portion, with a shed roofed addition. The main section houses the meeting spaces. Sheet metal has replaced the original shingle roofing. A porch roof follows the profile of the main roof a lower elevation on two sides.

Cady Hall was purchased by the Patagonia Women's Club in 1947, who donated space for the library from 1957. The building was restored in 1990. It was placed on the National Register of Historic Places in 1992 and it continues to house the Patagonia Public Library.
