= Patagonia Union High School =

Location
- 200 Naugle Ave; Patagonia, Arizona 85264; United States; 31°32′47″N 110°44′47″W

Information
- Type: Public
- Established: 1926 (100 years ago)
- School district: Patagonia Public Schools
- CEEB code: 030250
- Staff: 8.42 (on FTE basis)
- Grades: 9 to 12
- Enrollment: 80 (2023–2024)
- Student to teacher ratio: 9.50
- Colors: Black and orange
- Mascot: Lobo
- Website: patagonia.ss5.sharpschool.com

Patagonia Union High School (PUHS) is a public high school located in Patagonia, Arizona, United States, which serves rural eastern Santa Cruz County, including the communities of Patagonia, Sonoita, and Elgin. PUHS is a 1A school, with an enrollment of about 90 students in grades 9–12. Its mascot is the Lobo, the Spanish word for "wolf."

== History ==
The student population is 54% low income (i.e., eligible for free & reduced-price lunches by the federal definition). Ethnically, the student population is 52% Anglo and 48% Latino.

National and state authorities have lauded the school for its academic excellence. PUHS has met the federal standard of "adequate yearly progress" every year since the passage of No Child Left Behind. The Arizona Department of Education has given the school its highest rating (Excelling) for the past three years. PUHS is the only "Excelling" high school in Arizona south of the Tucson metro area.

In 2008, U.S. News & World Report recognized PUHS as a bronze medal school, a designation that indicates unusually good test scores for the school's demographics. Patagonia was then the only bronze medal school in southern Arizona outside the Tucson metro area.

Great Schools rated PUHS at 7 out of 10.

== Academic awards ==
Arizona Department of Education Report Cards

- 2002–2003: Excelling
- 2003–2004: Highly Performing
- 2004–2005: Performing
- 2005–2006: Excelling
- 2006–2007: Excelling
- 2007–2008: Excelling
- 2008–2009: Excelling

No Child Left Behind Adequate Yearly Progress

- 2002–2003: Met
- 2003–2004: Met
- 2004–2005: Met
- 2005–2006: Met
- 2006–2007: Met
- 2007–2008: Met

U.S. News & World Report America's Best Schools

- Bronze Medal, 2007, 2008

== Athletic achievements ==
Football

- Co-State Champion, Class C division, 1991
- State Champion, Class C division, 1988
- State Champion, Class C division, 1987

== Notable alumni ==
- Dinesh D'Souza, author, conservative activist, Reagan Administration policy analyst
- Jim Kolbe, Republican U.S. congressman for southern Arizona, 1985–2007
