= J. L. Schleimer =

American politician from Arizona

Member of the Arizona Senate from the Santa Cruz County district
- In office January 1921 – December 1922
- Preceded by: T. P. Thompson
- Succeeded by: C. A. Pierce

Personal details
- Party: Democratic
- Spouse: Gertrude
- Profession: Politician

J. L. Schleimer was an American politician from Arizona. He served a single term in the Arizona State Senate during the 5th Arizona State Legislature, holding the seat from Santa Cruz County. He was a real estate developer, first in California, then in Nogales, Arizona. Later in life he became the vice-council for Venezuela in Los Angeles.

== Biography ==
Schleiman was born on August 11, 1889, in San Diego, California. In the early 1910s, Schleimer was involved in the real estate business in Needles, California. By 1915, he was in San Francisco, where he was a director in the California Estate Company. In 1917, Schleimer had relocated to Nogales, Arizona, where he became partners with George D. Dunbar, a prominent Nogales real estate developer. They were partners in the Southwestern Investment Corporation. In 1918, Schleimer and Dunbar divested themselves of any interest in the Building & Loan Association in Nogales, Sonora, a company the two of them had formed.

In July 1918, after the United States entry into World War I, Schleimer volunteered and joined the U. S. Merchant Marine service, and reported for duty in San Francisco. After the war ended, Schleimer received an honorable discharge, and returned to Nogales. In February 1919, Schleimer married his wife, Gertrude, in Los Angeles, after which they returned to Nogales. In May 1919, he and several other partners incorporated an oil exploration company, the Arizona-Burk Oil Company, shortly after Schleimer returned from visiting the oil fields in Texas. In addition to the Texas oil fields, Schleimer was also interested in the oil fields in southern California, being part of the group behind the Paramount Oil Company, a group which also included Sidney Osborn, former Arizona Secretary of State, and future governor of Arizona. The company owned oil fields in Huntington Beach. After the death of Dunbar, Schleimer formed another real estate development company with his brother, Albert, The Border Investment and Realty Company. One of the first projects the Border Investment Company engaged in was the development of a 20-acre tract fronting Crawford Street.

In 1920, Schleimer ran unopposed in the Democrat primary for the single Arizona State Senate seat from Santa Cruz County. He also won in November's general election. After Álvaro Obregón, won the presidency of Mexico, Schleimer was one of the major forces in the United States advocating for the U. S. recognition of Obregón's government. It began prior to his assuming his duties as a state senator, when as a member of the Nogales Chamber of Commerce, he pushed for putting together a train of Arizona businessmen to go to Obregón's inauguration. During 1921 and 1922 he traveled the country speaking in front of state legislatures and chambers of commerce, attempting to get them to draw up declarations in support of the Obregón presidency. As a state senator, he authored the proclamation in the state senate wherein Arizona became the first state in the union to recognize the new government. Then he got numerous other states and organizations to do the same. He became known as "Obregon's original booster". In 1924, when a plot was uncovered to overthrow President Obregón, Schleimer was in Los Angeles, helping the Mexican government handle the conflict.

By 1927, Schleimer had returned to California, living in Los Angeles. In March 1928, Schleimer became the district manager for the Mexican National Navigation Lines. By 1932, Schleimer was the vice-consul for the Venezuelan embassy in Los Angeles, and he had moved to Bardsdale. He held the position at least through 1938. In 1936, he became embroiled in a bitter divorce with his wife. Gertrude claimed that Jack had forced her to sign away her rights to their property in Bardsdale, while Jack filed a cross-complaint that Gertrude was having an affair while he had been away in Panama on business. The cross-complaints for divorce were initially denied in California's Superior Court in October, but Jack Schleimer refiled and was granted a divorce in December 1936. In the divorce decree, in what was called an "unusual decision", Gertrude was given custody of their teenage daughter, while Jack was given custody of the two minor boys. Schleimer died on December 9, 1953, in Glendale, California, and was buried in Forest Lawn Memorial Park.
