= Leslie C. Hardy =

American politician from Arizona

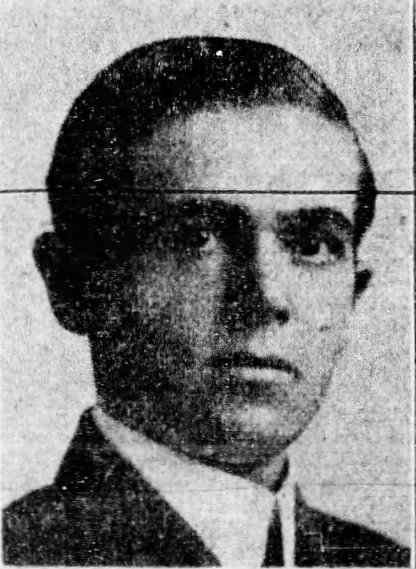
- Hardy, ca. 1911

Member of the Arizona Senate from the Pinal County district
- In office January 1925 – December 1926
- Preceded by: C. A. Pierce
- Succeeded by: Andrew Bettwy

Personal details
- Born: 1886 Indian Fields, Kentucky
- Died: October 18, 1968 (aged 81–82) Phoenix, Arizona
- Party: Democratic
- Spouse(s): Nora 1920-1936 (her death), Josephine ?-1968 (his death)
- Children: Dorothy Anne
- Education: Wake Forest University
- Profession: Politician

Leslie C. Hardy was an American politician from Arizona. He served a single term in the Arizona State Senate during the 7th Arizona State Legislature, holding the seat from Pinal County. He also served as Arizona's first assistant attorney general after it became a state in 1912. During the 1950s he was also responsible for revising the Arizona statutory code.

== Biography ==
Hardy was born in 1886 in Indian Fields, Kentucky, and was a descendent of Daniel Boone. In 1894 his parents moved the family to Arizona. He graduated from Wake Forest with a law degree in 1909, and was admitted to the Arizona bar that same year.

In 1911, he ran unsuccessfully for Pima County attorney, losing to Republican George Hilzinger in December's general election. The following year, while still living in Tucson, Hardy was appointed to the newly created position of assistant Attorney General of the State of Arizona, the State's first. In 1914 he ran for the State Attorney's General office. However, he was defeated by Wiley E. Jones in the Democrat primary. When the U. S. entered World War I, he enlisted in the U. S. Army, and served in the 7th Cavalry under then Lt. Colonel George S. Patton. While he was still in the service, he was elected county attorney in Santa Cruz County, and was released from active duty to return to Arizona to assume his position as county attorney. He married Nora E. McComb in Los Angeles, California on September 29, 1920. She was from Phoenix. The couple had one child, Dorothy Anne. Nora died on February 12, 1936, in Phoenix, after a long illness.

In the early 1950s he was in charge of revising Arizona's statutes. After a five-year process, his commission's revisions were codified into law by the Arizona State Legislature. Over his career, he advised most of Arizona's governors, and became known as the "Dean of Arizona's Lawyers". At some point he remarried, his second wife's name was Josephine, who he remained married to until his death. He died on October 18, 1968, in St. Joseph's Hospital in Phoenix.
