= Patagonia, Arizona =

- Town
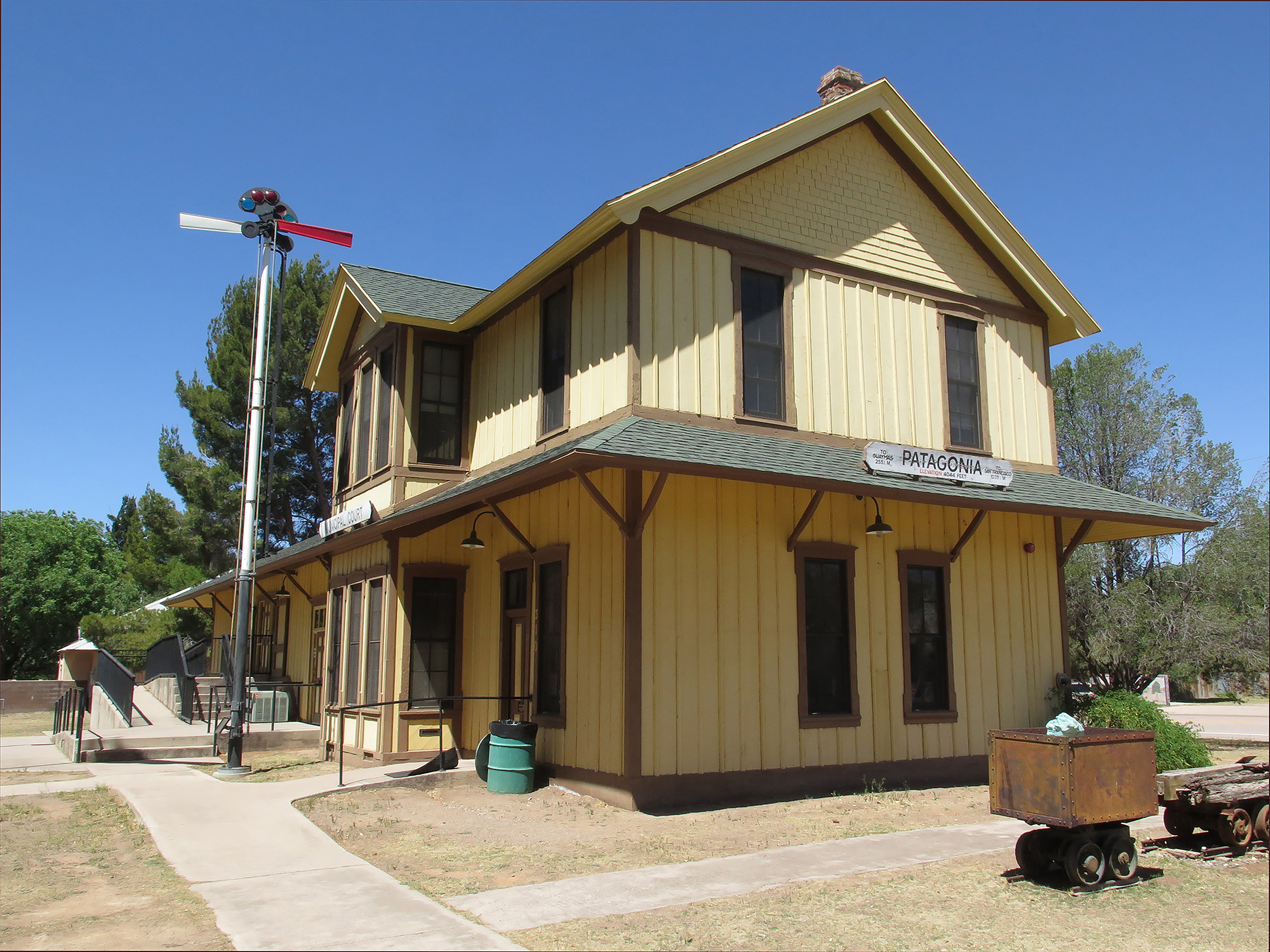
- Town hall

- Location of Patagonia in Santa Cruz County, Arizona

- Patagonia Patagonia (the United States)
- Coordinates: 31°32′22″N 110°45′22″W
- Country: United States
- State: Arizona
- County: Santa Cruz

Government
  - Type: Council–manager
  - Body: Patagonia Town Council
  - Mayor: Andrea Wood
  - Vice Mayor: Michael Stabile
  - Town Council: List: • Steve Finch; • A. Francesca Claveria; • Garie Retherford

Area
  - Total: 1.29 sq mi (3.35 km^{2})
  - Land: 1.29 sq mi (3.34 km^{2})
  - Water: 0.0039 sq mi (0.01 km^{2})
- Elevation: 4,058 ft (1,237 m)

Population (2020)
  - Total: 804
  - Density: 623.6/sq mi (240.76/km^{2})
- Time zone: UTC-07:00 (MST)
- ZIP code: 85624
- Area code: 520
- FIPS code: 04-53490
- GNIS feature ID: 32726
- Website: Official website

Patagonia is a town in Santa Cruz County, Arizona, United States. As of the 2020 census, Patagonia had a population of 804. It developed in the mid-19th century as a trading and supply center for nearby mines and ranches. In the 21st century, it is a tourist destination, retirement community, and arts and crafts center.

== History ==
The area where Patagonia is located provided Native American communities with plentiful hunting and fishing opportunities. Archaeologists have identified the remains of Native American settlements, resource processing sites, and petroglyphs in the area surrounding Patagonia. The area was known as a Tohono O'odham ranchería, or seasonal village, called Sonoitac.

In 1539, Spanish explorer Fray Marcos de Niza entered the area near Lochiel on the Mexican border. He continued on his journey to Zuni Pueblo, New Mexico also known as the Seven Cities of Cibola. Marcos de Niza is credited with being the first European in what is now the State of Arizona. The main Native American tribes in the area at that time were the Sobaipuri and Papago (Tohono O'odham).

In 1692, Father Eusebio Francisco Kino came to the area as a missionary. His main objective was to convert the natives to Catholicism. The area became part of his Mission Los Santos Ángeles de Guevavi. By 1698, Father Kino encouraged his group to make their way up to Sonoita Creek. When they arrived in Sonoita Creek they encountered groups of indigenous people living along the area in which the creek was located. In the future that area would become known as Patagonia.

According to German Quiroga, president of the Patagonia Museum, Welsh miners came to this region from Patagonia, a region encompassing the vast southernmost tip of South America, shared by Argentina and Chile, divided by the Andes mountains. The mountains in this area of Arizona, which the Native Americans called Chihuahuillas, reminded the miners of the Andes, and they began calling them the Patagonia Mountains.

The mission period was ended in 1768 by a decree of Charles III of Spain. In 1821, the Mexican War of Independence between Mexico and Spain came to an end and the territory of New Spain, which included Arizona, was ceded to Mexico.

By the mid-1850s prospectors were mining the silver-rich mountains east of Sonoita. By the 1860s vast amounts of silver and lead were retrieved from the Patagonia Mountains each year. In 1854, the United States purchased the region from Mexico in what is known as the Gadsden Purchase. Americans of European descent from the East Coast of the United States began to arrive in the area. They were protected from the constant attacks of the Apaches by the United States Military. However, the majority of the troops were withdrawn from the area upon the outbreak of the American Civil War. Fort Buchanan, a small garrison established in 1856 near Sonoita, was overrun by the Apaches. Thus, the miners, ranchers and farmers in the region were without protection from the Apaches and many of them moved to other areas.

The Civil War between the North (the Union) and the South (the Confederacy) ended in 1865. In 1867, the United States Army established a military post called Camp Crittenden close to Sonoita. The camp, which later was renamed Fort Crittenden, was involved in a campaign against the Apache with the intention of protecting the American pioneers in the area. The miners, ranchers and farmers returned to the area once more.

Rollin Rice Richardson, a veteran of the Civil War, made a fortune in mining. In 1896, Rollin hired J.C. Green, a surveyor from Tucson, to plot the settlement. As a result, he founded the town that same year and in 1899, he applied to open a post office. Richardson wanted the town to be named "Rollin" in his honor, however the residents of the area opposed. They petitioned the United States Post Master General to name the town Patagonia after the nearby mountain. Patagonia was recognized as the official name of the town in 1900 by the United States Postal Office Department in Washington, D.C.

That same year, a two-story railroad depot was built and Patagonia became the commercial center of the mining district in the Santa Cruz County. The ranching and cattle industry also played an important role in the economy of Patagonia. The arrival of the New Mexico and Arizona Railroad to Patagonia gave the ranchers and miners a new outlet for their products and access to manufactured goods.

By 1917, Patagonia had running water, an Opera House, three hotels, a schoolhouse, two parks and several stores and saloons. Richardson practically ruled the town until his death in 1923. Patagonia was formally incorporated in 1948. The railroad was abandoned in 1962.

== Geography ==
The town is located in the valley of Sonoita Creek between the Santa Rita Mountains to the north and the Patagonia Mountains to the south. State Route 82 passes through the town. Nogales lies to the southwest and Sonoita to the northeast.

The former mining camps (now ghost towns) of Harshaw, Duquesne and Lochiel lie to the southeast along the eastern margin of the Patagonia Mountains. The high San Rafael Valley also lies to the southeast. Patagonia Lake State Park, around Patagonia Lake, lies about six miles southwest of the town.

Most of the soils are calcareous silty clay loams (Pima series), with calcareous sandy loam of the Comoro series and noncalcareous sandy loam of the Caralampi series also present.

According to the United States Census Bureau, the town has a total area of 1.3 square miles (3.3 km^{2}), all land.

== Demographics ==
Historical population
Census	Pop.	Note	%±
1950	700		—
1960	540		−22.9%
1970	630		16.7%
1980	980		55.6%
1990	888		−9.4%
2000	881		−0.8%
2010	913		3.6%
2020	804		−11.9%
U.S. Decennial Census

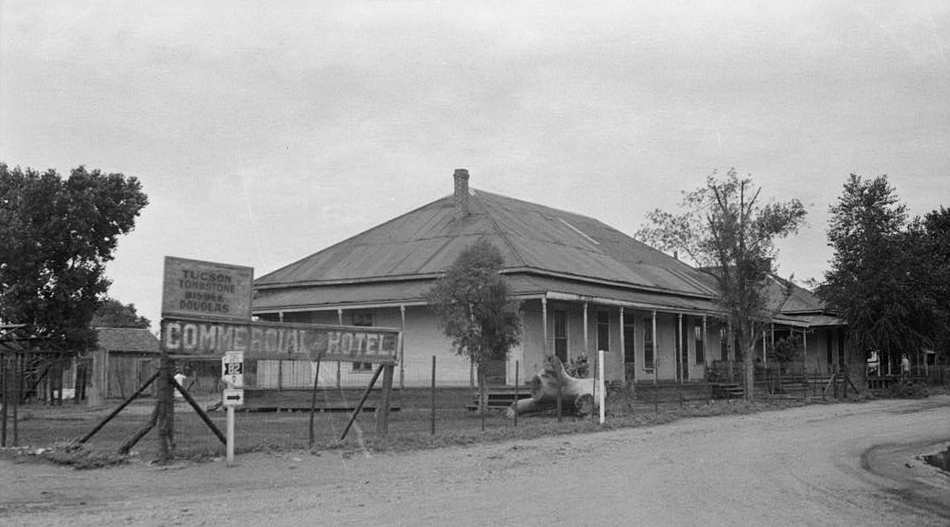
Patagonia's Commercial Hotel in 1937

Historic railroad depot built in 1900

At the 2000 census there were 881 people, 404 households, and 239 families in the town. The population density was 738.7 inhabitants per square mile (285.2/km^{2}). There were 498 housing units at an average density of 417.5 per square mile (161.2/km^{2}). The racial makeup of the town was 86% White, 1% Native American, <1% Asian, 11% from other races, and 2% from two or more races. 39.5% of the population were Hispanic or Latino of any race. Of the 404 households 23% had children under the age of 18 living with them, 47% were married couples living together, 9% had a female householder with no husband present, and 41% were non-families. 35% of households were one person and 15% were one person aged 65 or older. The average household size was 2.2 and the average family size was 2.8.

The age distribution was 21% under the age of 18, 5% from 18 to 24, 20% from 25 to 44, 32% from 45 to 64, and 21% 65 or older. The median age was 47 years. For every 100 females there were 87.8 males. For every 100 females age 18 and over, there were 85.9 males.

The median household income was $25,795 and the median family income was $31,000. Males had a median income of $25,625 versus $24,844 for females. The per capita income for the town was $15,325. About 18% of families and 25% of the population were below the poverty line, including 36% of those under age 18 and 17% of those age 65 or over.

As of 2010, Patagonia had a population of 913. The racial and ethnic composition of the population was 56% non-Hispanic white, less than 1% African American, less than 2% Native American, less than 1% non-Hispanics reporting some other race, 1% reporting two or more races and 42% Hispanic or Latino.

== Notable people ==
- Erik Asphaug, planetary scientist
- Philip Caputo, author
- Jim Harrison, novelist, poet, and food critic
- Hilde Lysiak, journalist
- Gary Nabhan, prizewinning writer and ethnobotanist

== See also ==
- Patagonia Union High School
- List of historic properties in Patagonia, Arizona
