= Mitragyna rubrostipulata =

Scientific classification
- Kingdom: Plantae
- Clade: Tracheophytes
- Clade: Angiosperms
- Clade: Eudicots
- Clade: Asterids
- Order: Gentianales
- Family: Rubiaceae
- Genus: Mitragyna
- Species: M. rubrostipulata

Binomial name
- Mitragyna rubrostipulata (K.Schum) Havil.

Synonyms
- Adina rubrostipulata K.Schum.; Fleroya rubrostipulata (K.Schum.) Y.F.Deng; Hallea rubrostipulata (K.Schum.) J.-F.Leroy; Mitragyna rubrostipulata (K.Schum.) Havil.

Species of plant

Mitragyna rubrostipulata is a tree indigenous to East Africa. It is native from Ethiopia through east-central tropical Africa (Burundi, Kenya, Malawi, Rwanda, Tanzania, Uganda and Zaire) to Mozambique. It grows in wet forests up to 2,000 m above sea level and is abundant in swamp forests along Lake Victoria.

== Description ==
The tree is up to 20 m high, has a few large branches that forms a rounded crown. The bark is light grey brown, fairly rough and thick. The leaves are large, in opposite pairs, shiny above and widely oval. Flowers occur in round heads, 2.5 cm across, green-yellow-white with a sweet scent on 3–7 cm long stalks. The fruits in the head are capsules around 1 cm long, and contain a few tiny winged seeds.

== Uses ==
The timber is fairly good and it is used for firewood, charcoal, timber, to make dug out canoes and for soil improvement.

== Phytochemicals ==
Mitragyna rubrostipulata contains the alkaloids hirsuteine, mitraphylline, isomitraphylline, isorotundifoline, rotundifoline-N-oxide, isorhynchophylline, rhynchophylline-N-oxide, rhynchophylline, and rotundifoline.

== Medicinal use ==
The bark and roots are widely used in the areas where it grows. In the Sango Bay area in Uganda, it is one of the three most commonly used plants to treat malaria. This area is one of the areas in Uganda most heavily affected by malaria, and the health care system is poorly developed. People to a great extent use plants to treat different illnesses. The two other top species used for malaria are Warburgia salutaris and Syzygium guineense, all of them are trees with bark as main plant part used. The few individuals of W. salutaris and some of the H. rubrostipulata found were heavily debarked. The trees are also difficult to access in the rainy season, when the mosquitoes and malaria are at the worst, as the forest is flooded for 2–3 months.

== Community project to improve human and environmental health ==
The research by Ssesegawa and Kasenene initiated a community project. Two small nurseries were established with a little support from Uganda Forest Department, the People and Planet initiative in UK and The Uganda Group of the African Network of Ethnobiology (UGANEB). The objective of the project was to collect seeds and raise seedlings of important plants used for malaria. Using a community-based approach, the project investigated how to develop management systems to allow sustainable use of the targeted species. Cultivation of the plants was promoted to provide material for treatments locally and also to sell to provide income. Together with representatives for UGANEB, the villagers also visited Tooro Botanical Gardens in Fort Portal and the Namanve Tree Seed Centre in Kampala, which gave them valuable inspiration and knowledge. The nurseries were run by local people. They managed to raise seedlings of W. salutaris and S. guinense, but had problems with the germination of M. rubrostipulata. A laboratory experiment on germination showed that viable seeds germinated plentifully (>60%) and very quickly (2–10 days), but they needed light to germinate. The nurseries have now succeeded in raising seedlings of all the trees, and seedling are distributed to community members. This is an example of how local people, researchers, NGOs and governmental institutions can work together to improve livelihood for people as well as improving management of natural resources.
