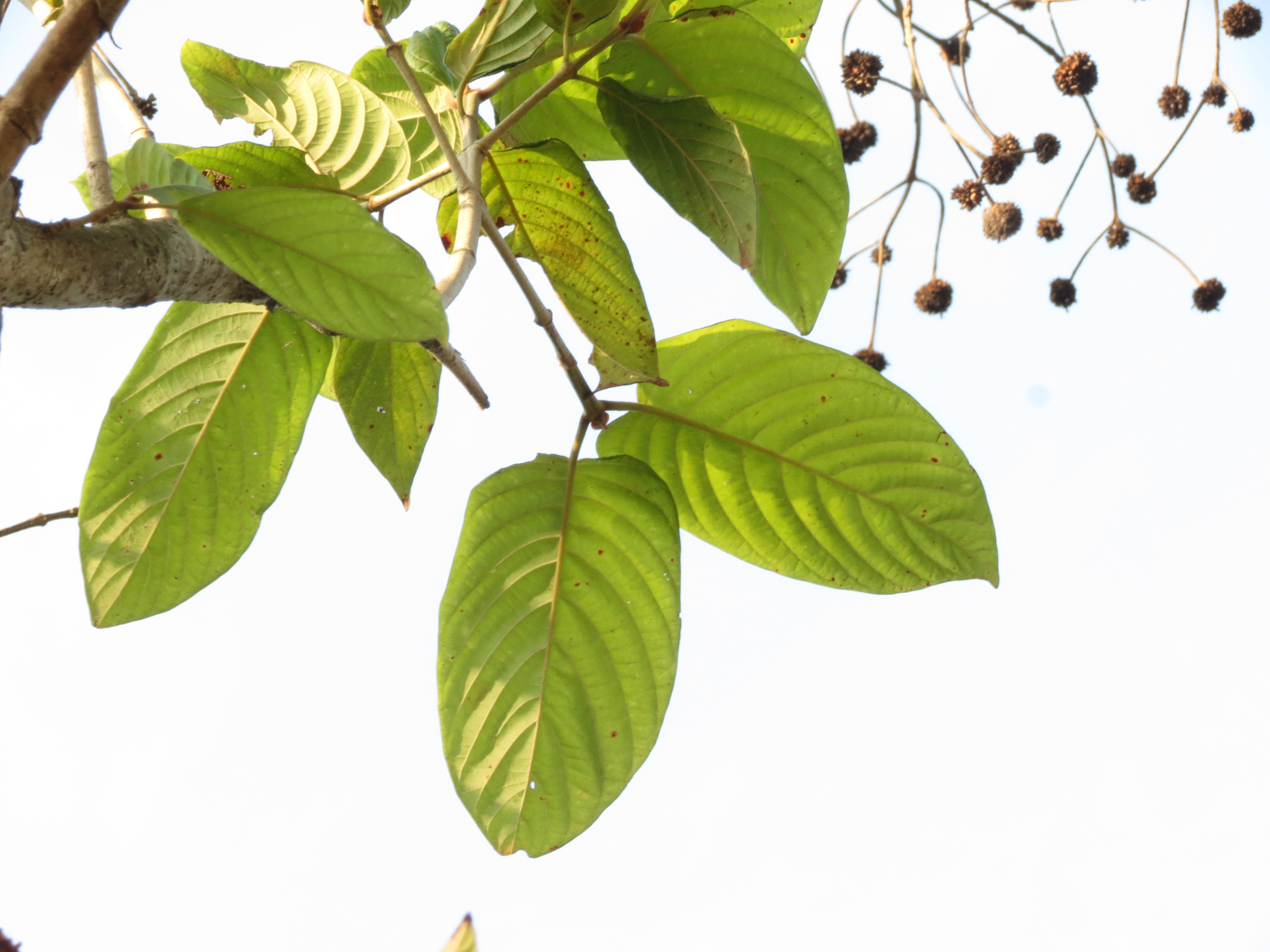
- Tree in Shivanahalli, Bengaluru

Scientific classification
- Kingdom: Plantae
- Clade: Tracheophytes
- Clade: Angiosperms
- Clade: Eudicots
- Clade: Asterids
- Order: Gentianales
- Family: Rubiaceae
- Genus: Mitragyna
- Species: M. tubulosa

Binomial name
- Mitragyna tubulosa (Roxb.) Korth

Synonyms
- Nauclea tubulosa Roxb.

= Mitragyna tubulosa =

Species of plant

Mitragyna tubulosa is a tree species found in Peninsular India in the Western Ghats.

== Phytochemicals ==
Mitragyna tubulosa contains the alkaloids Mitraciliatine, rhynchociline, ciliaphylline, rotundifoline, isorotundifoline, rhynchophylline, isorhyncophylline, mitraphylline, isomitraphylline, ciliaphylline-N-oxide.

== Gallery ==
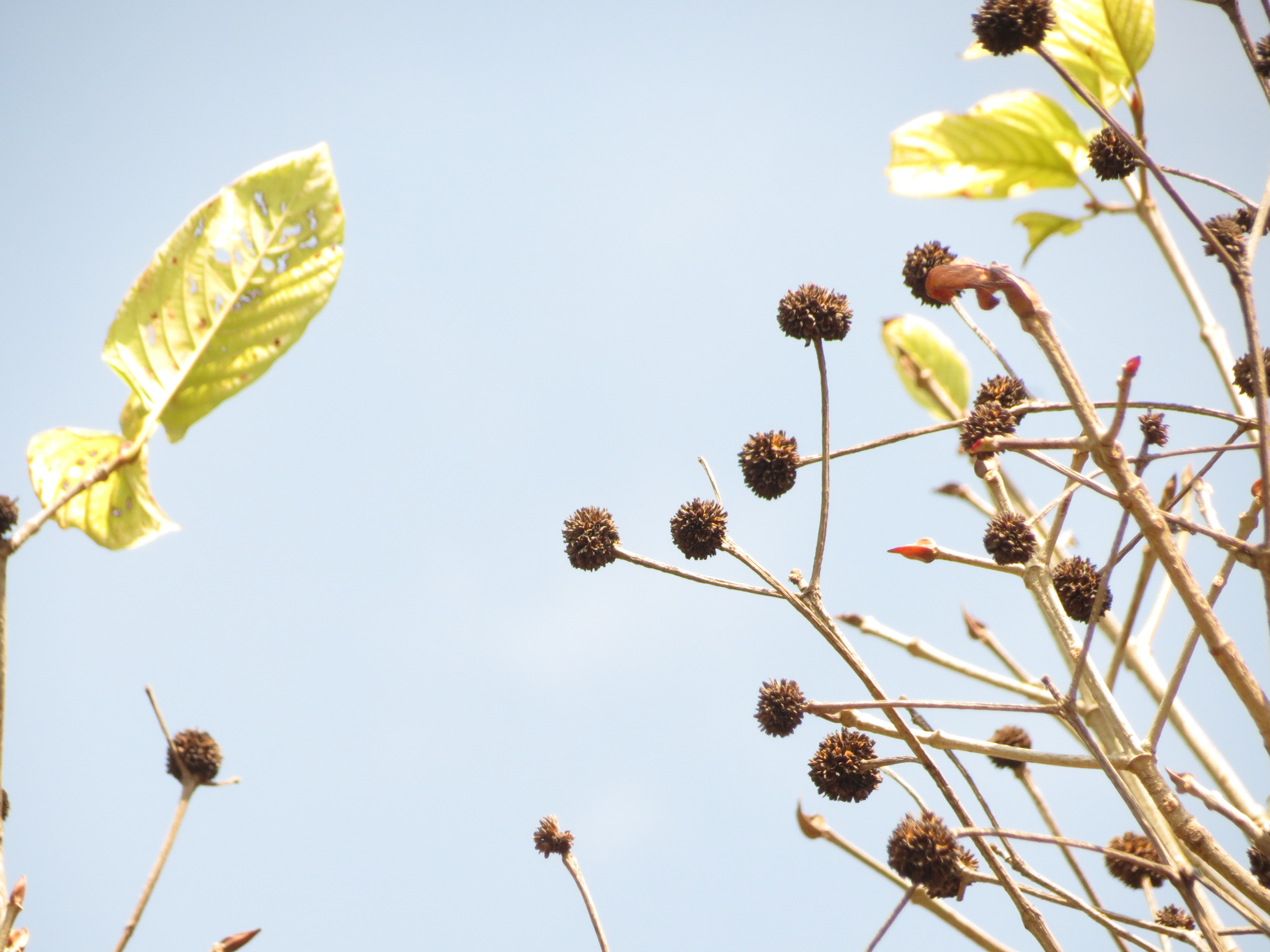

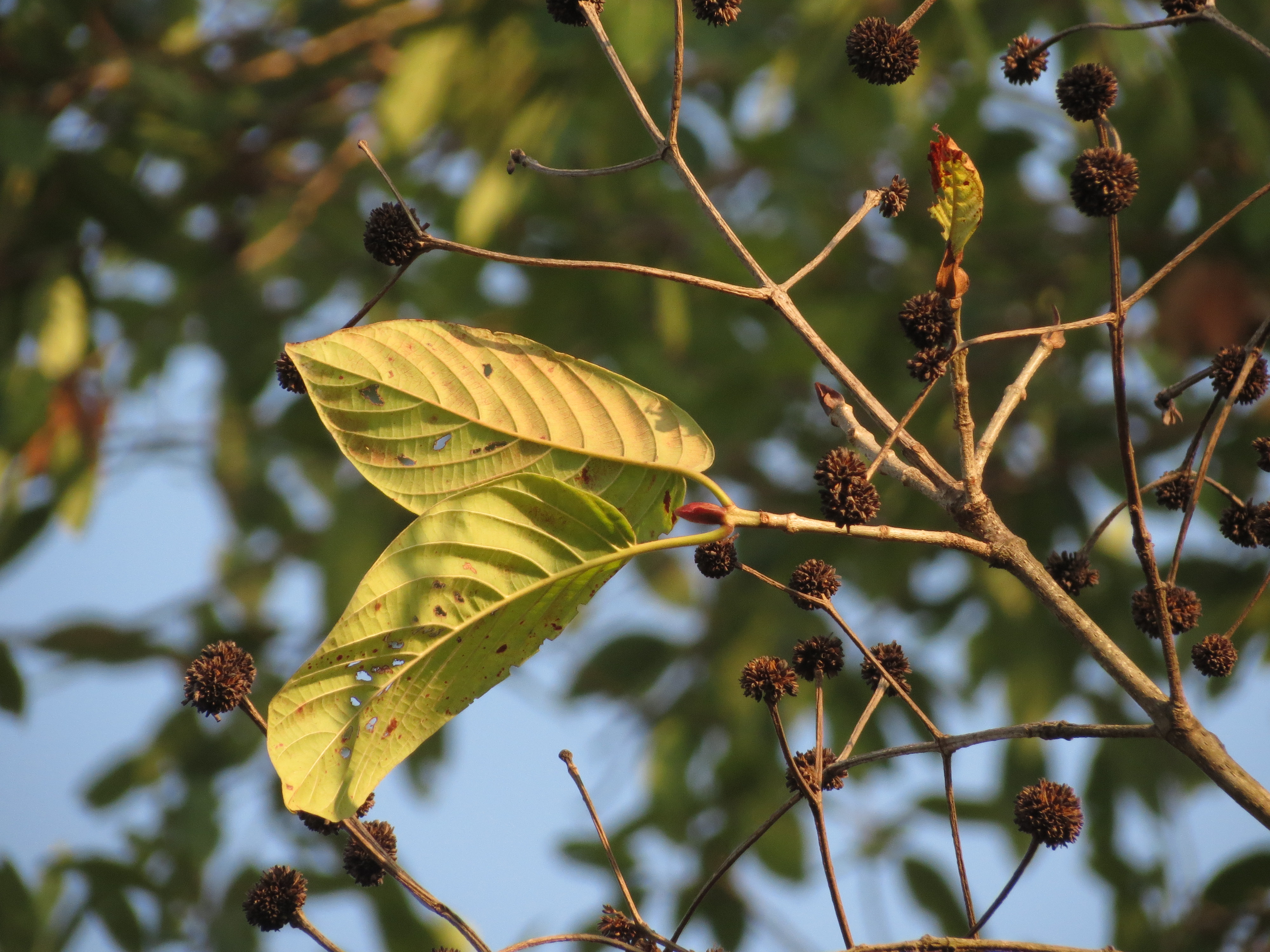

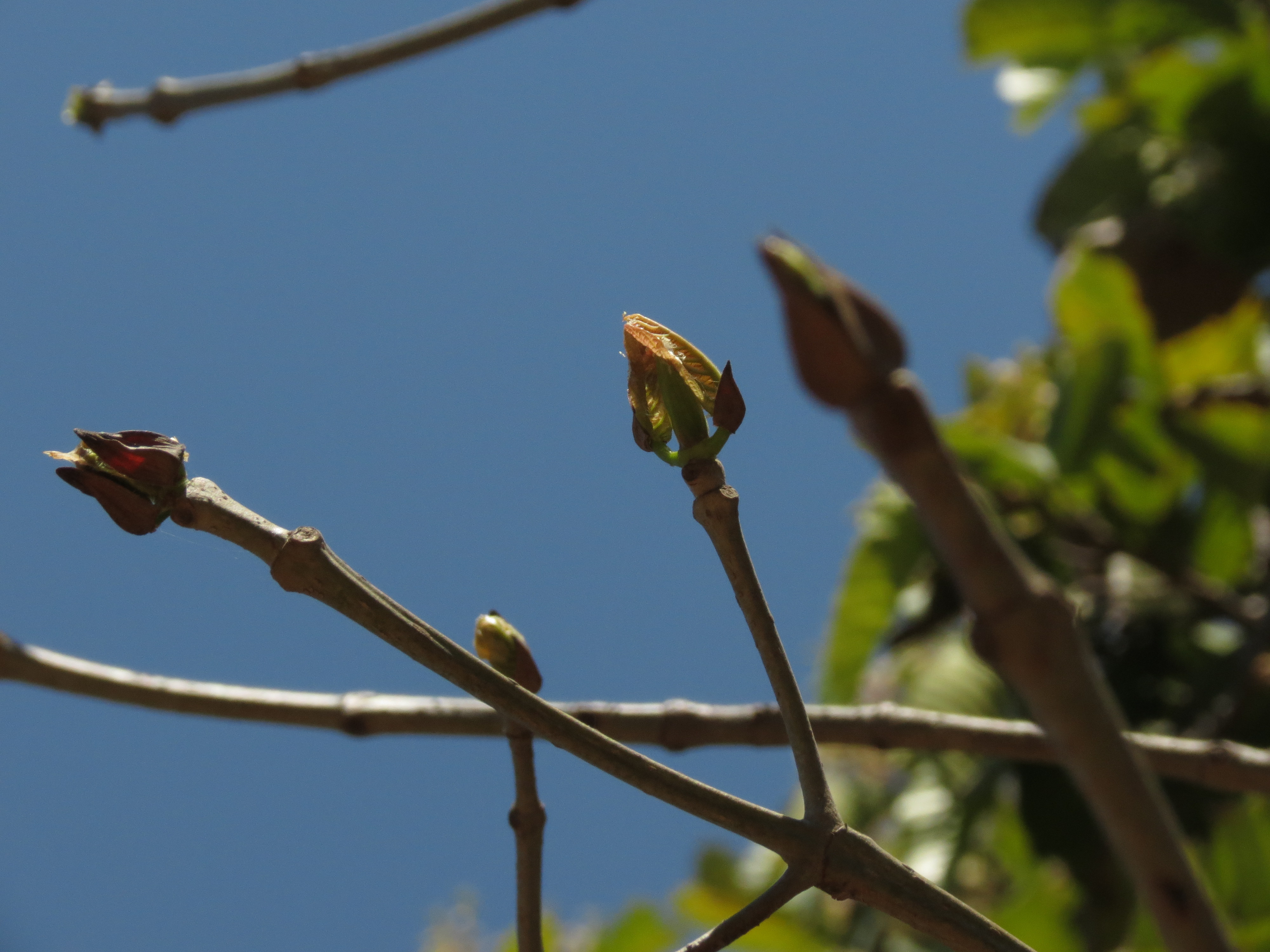

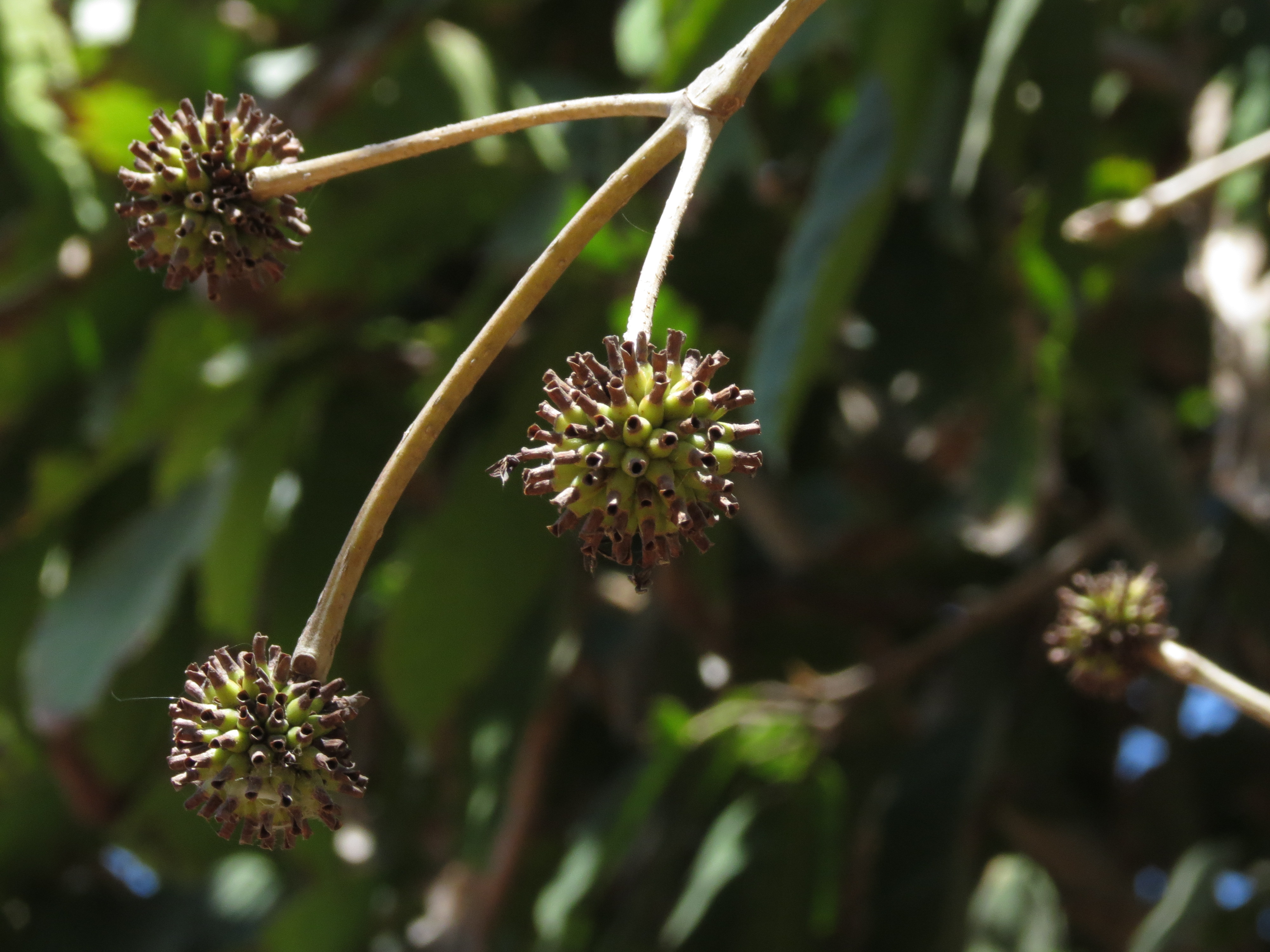

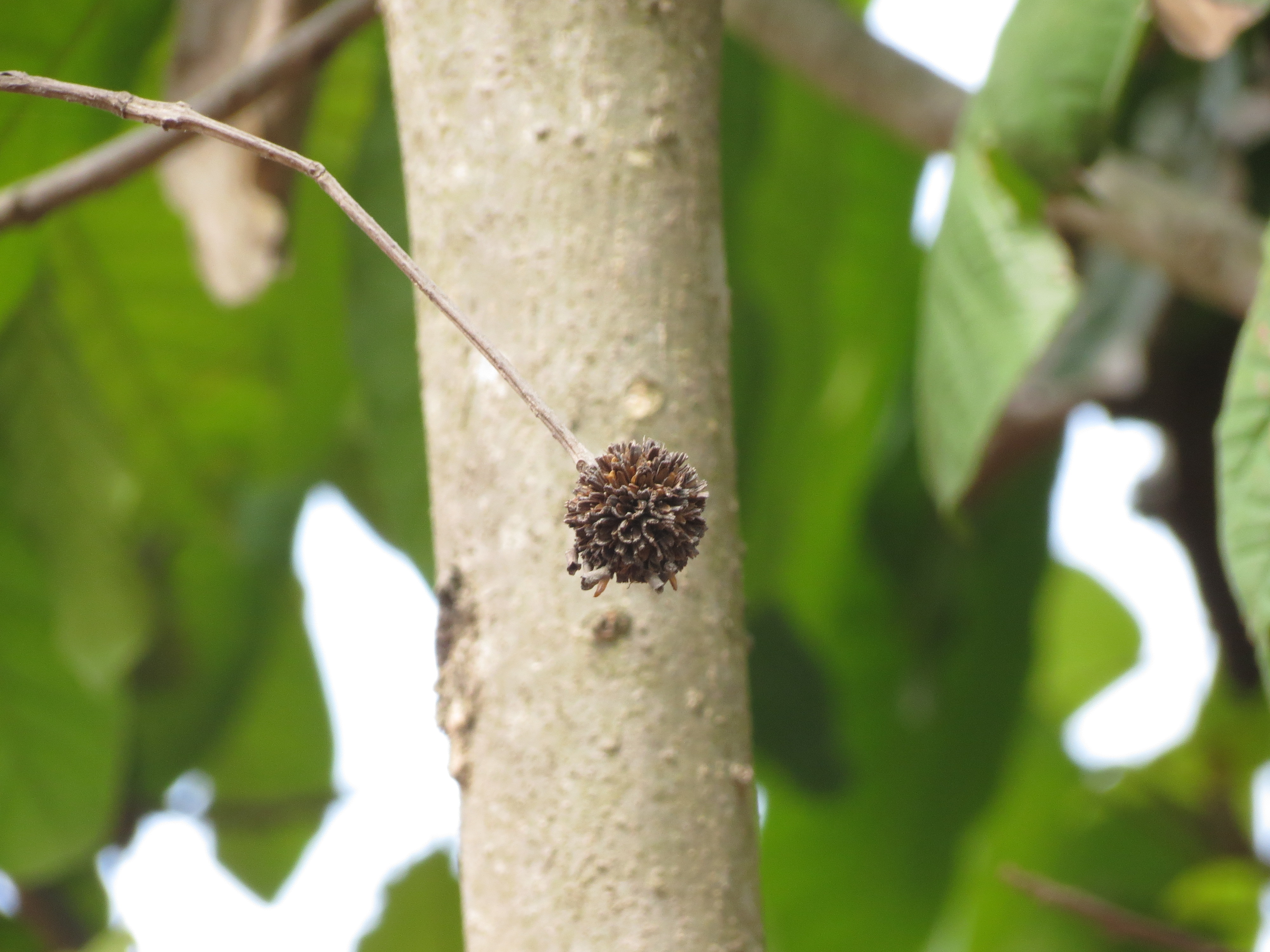

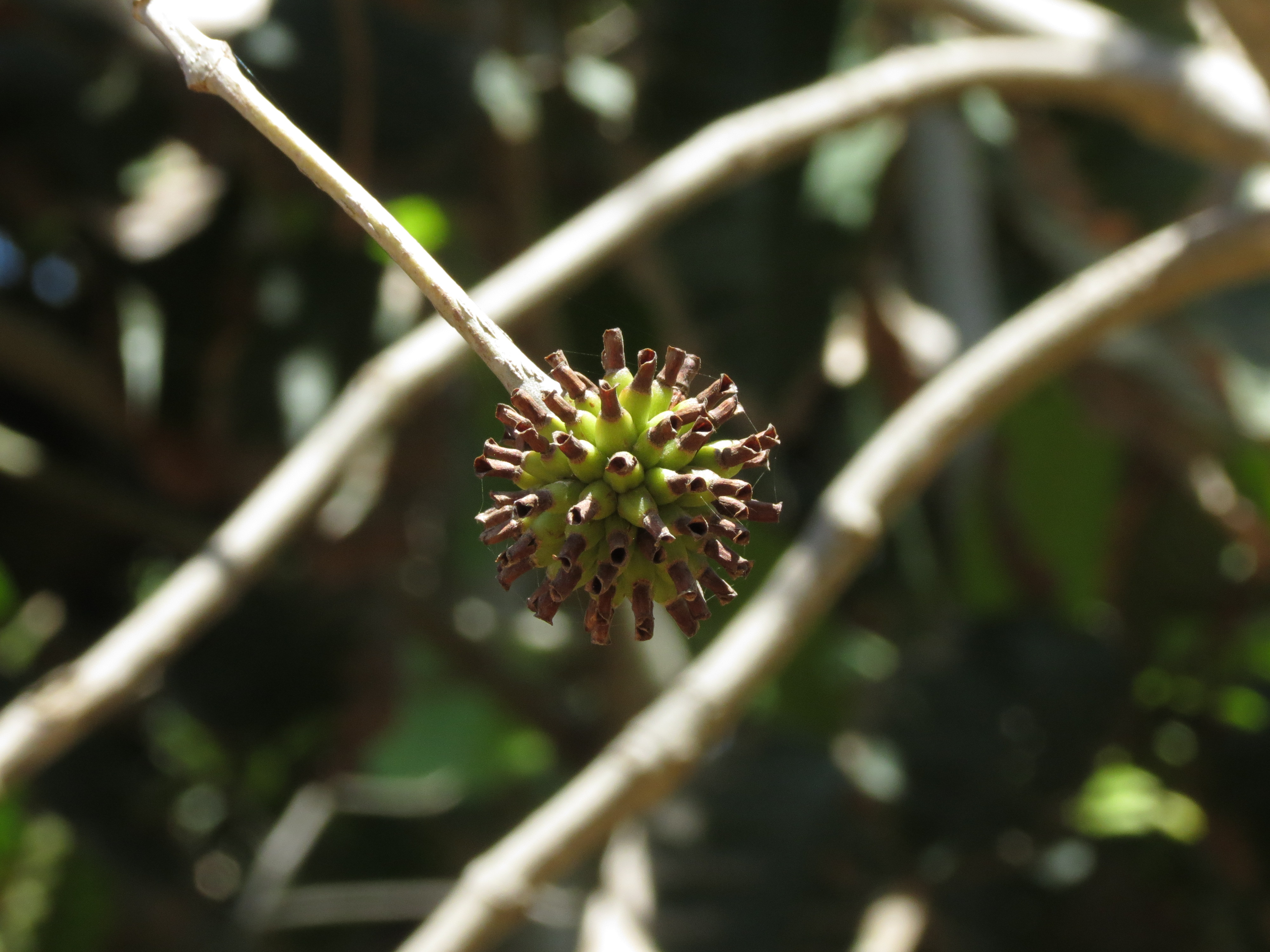

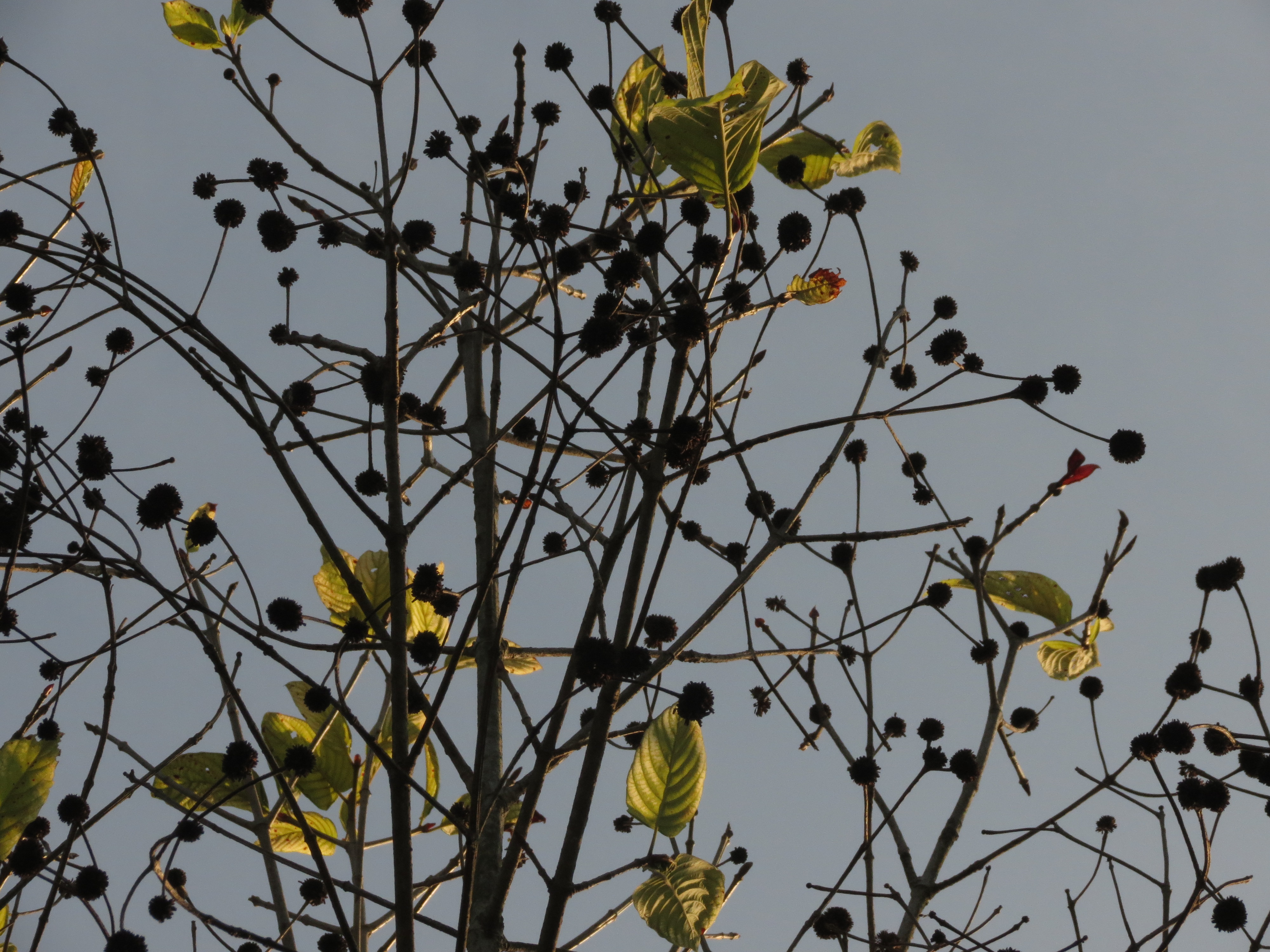

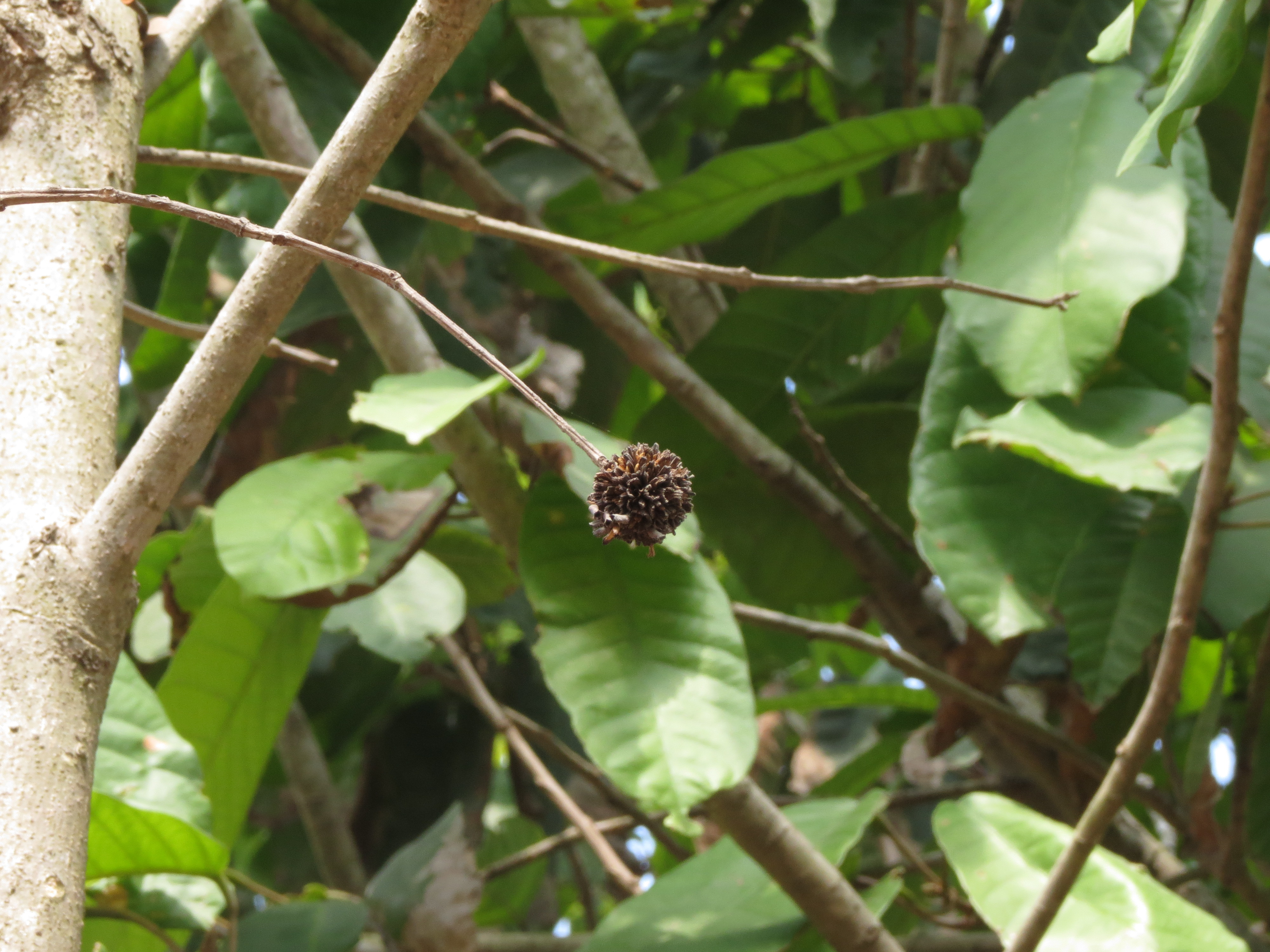

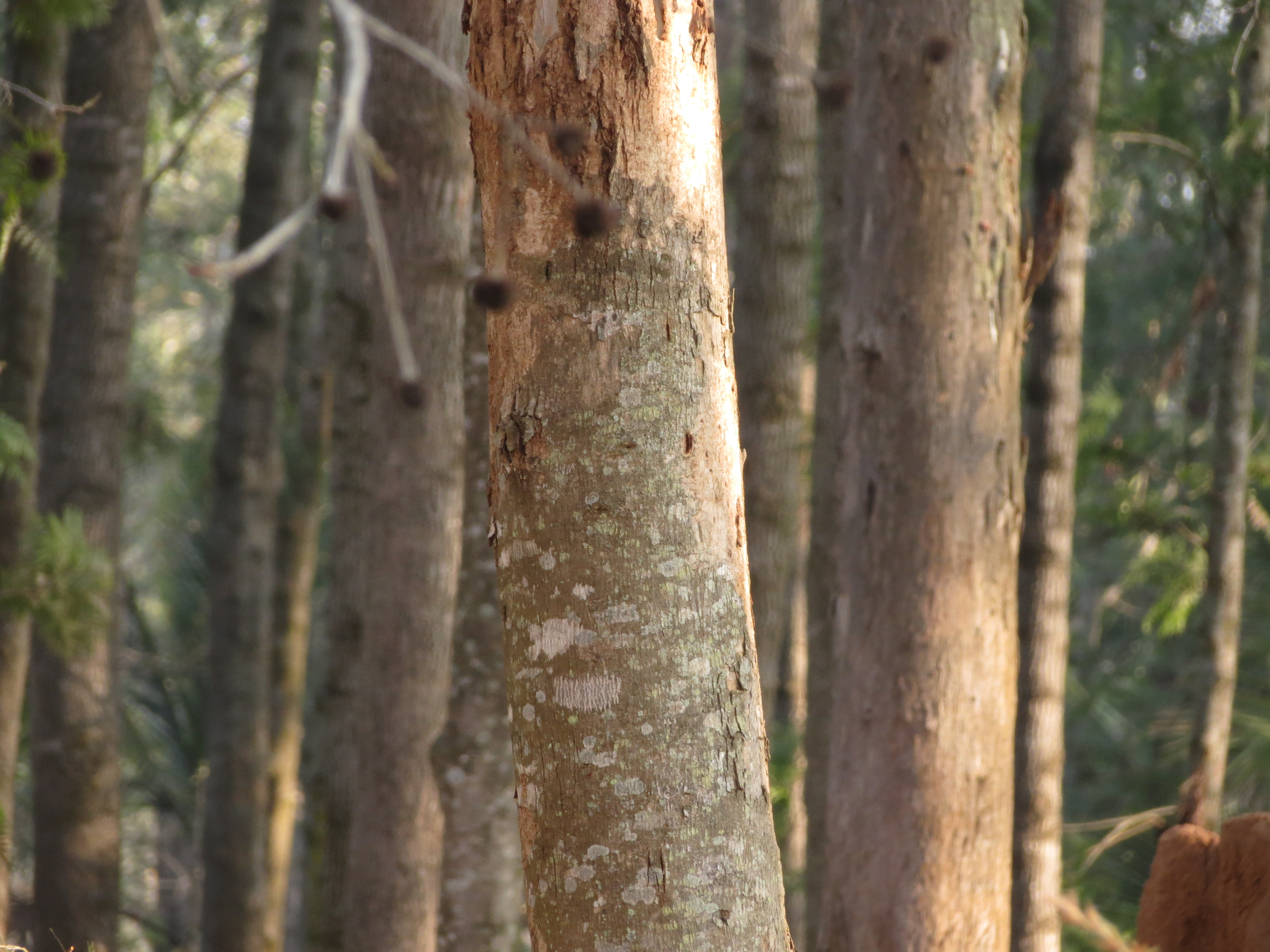

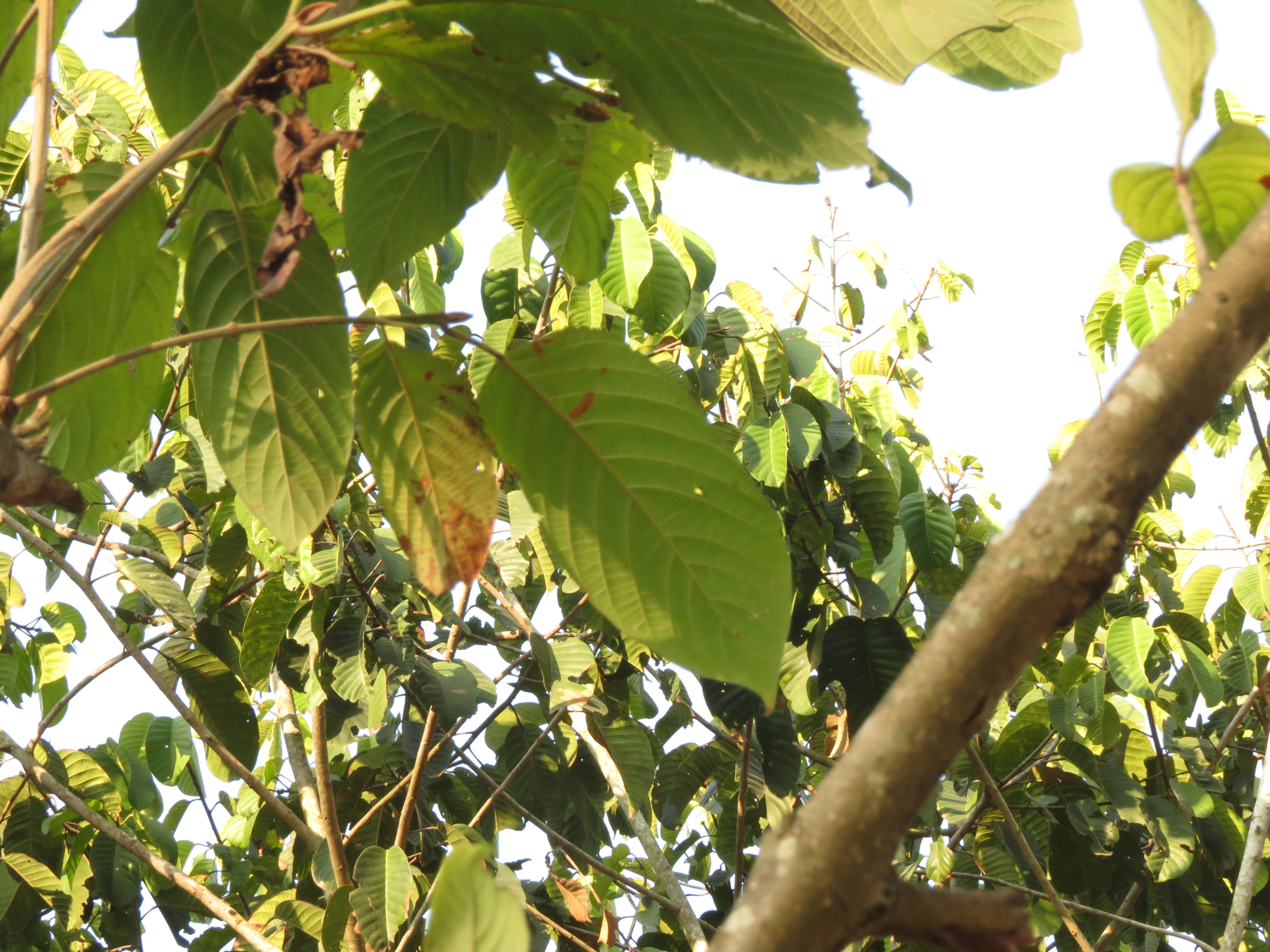

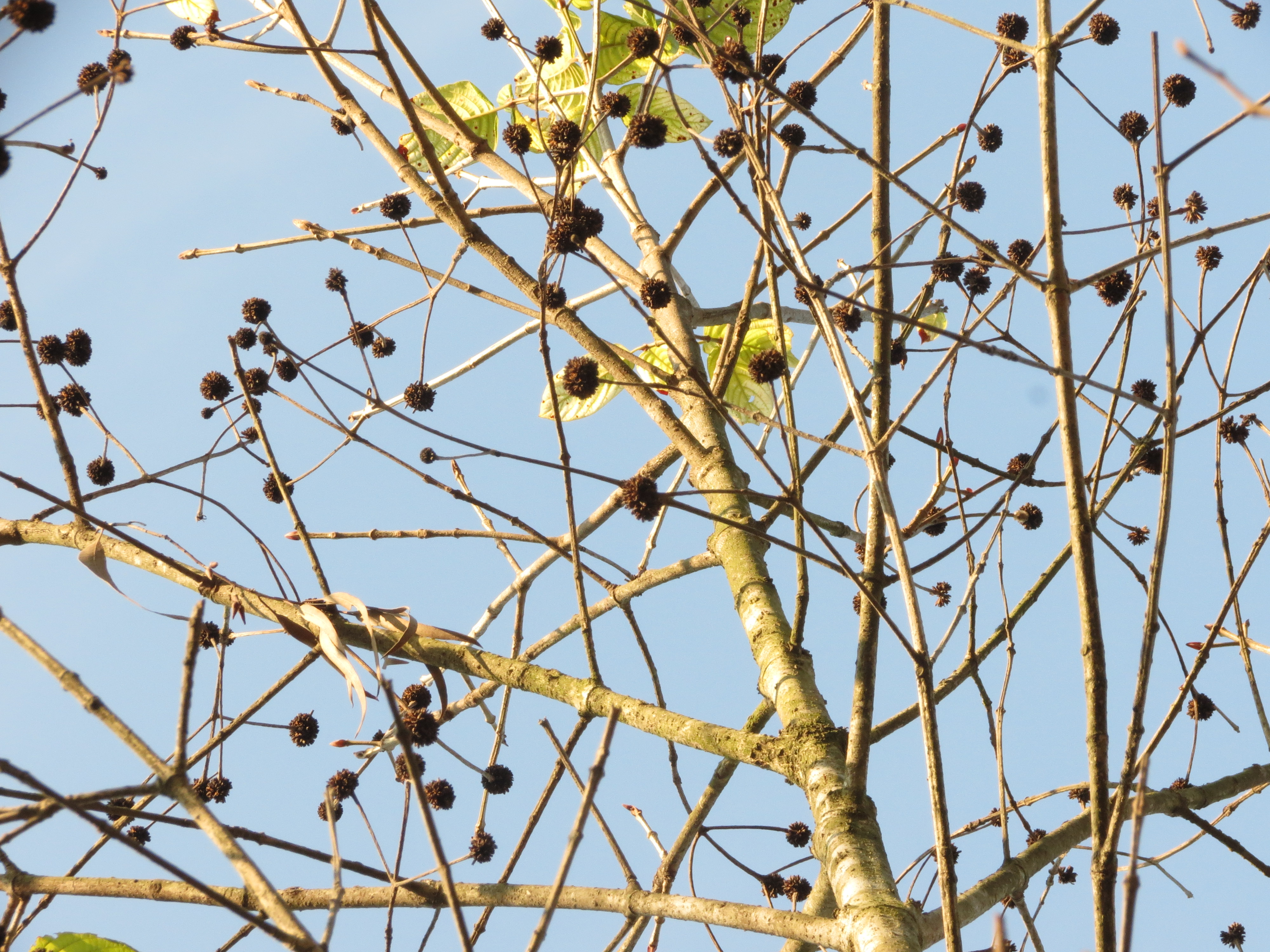

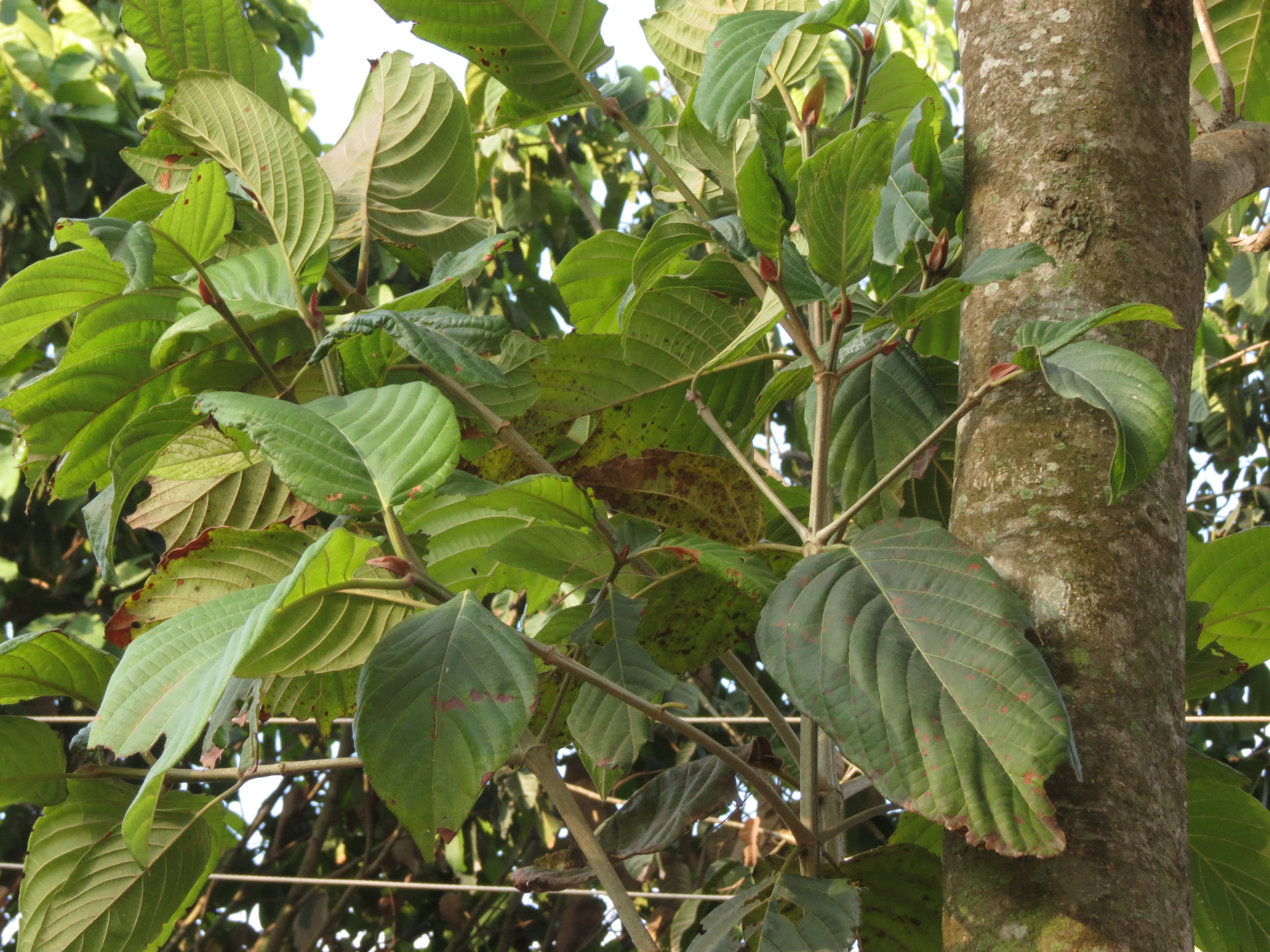

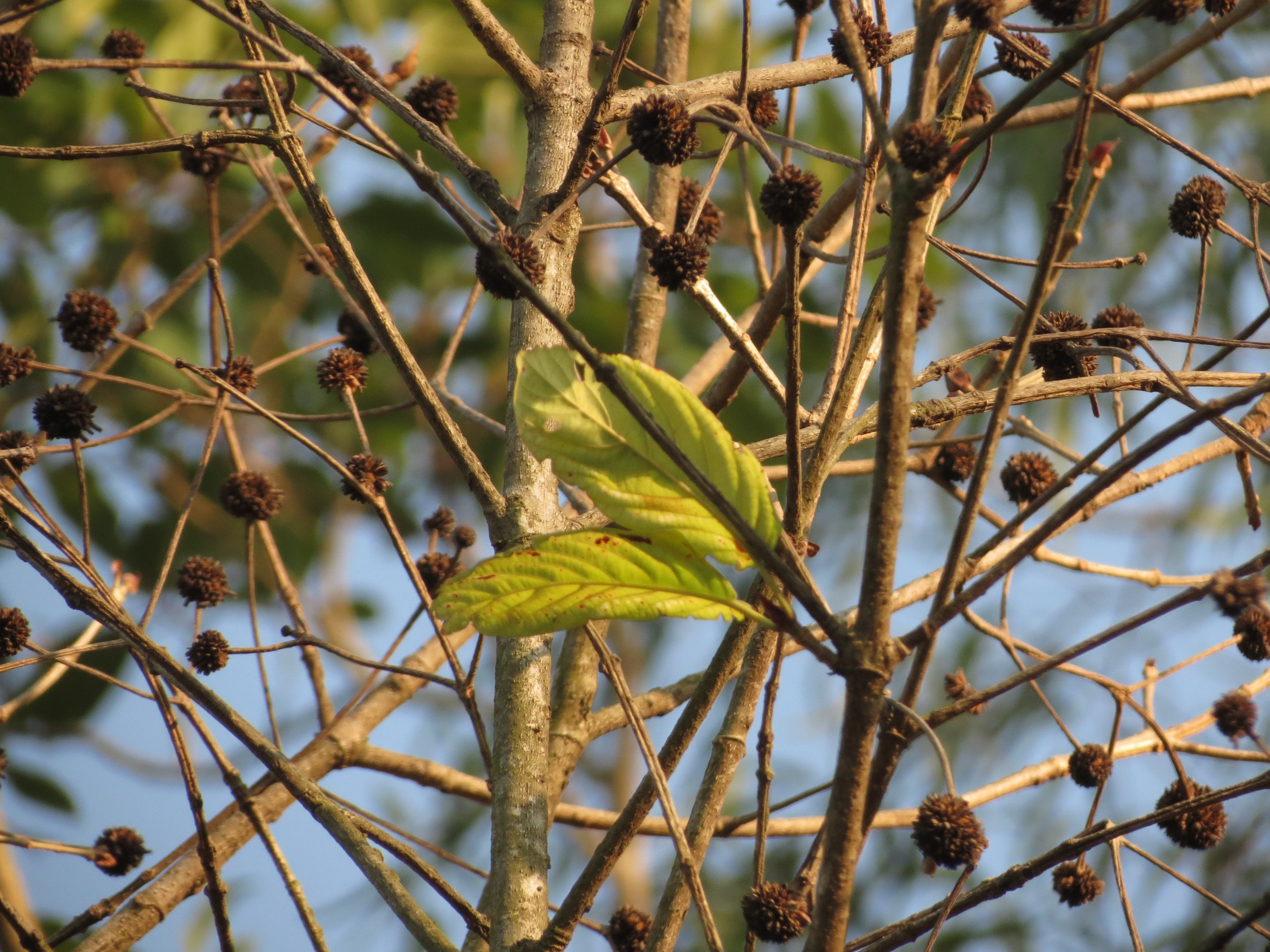
