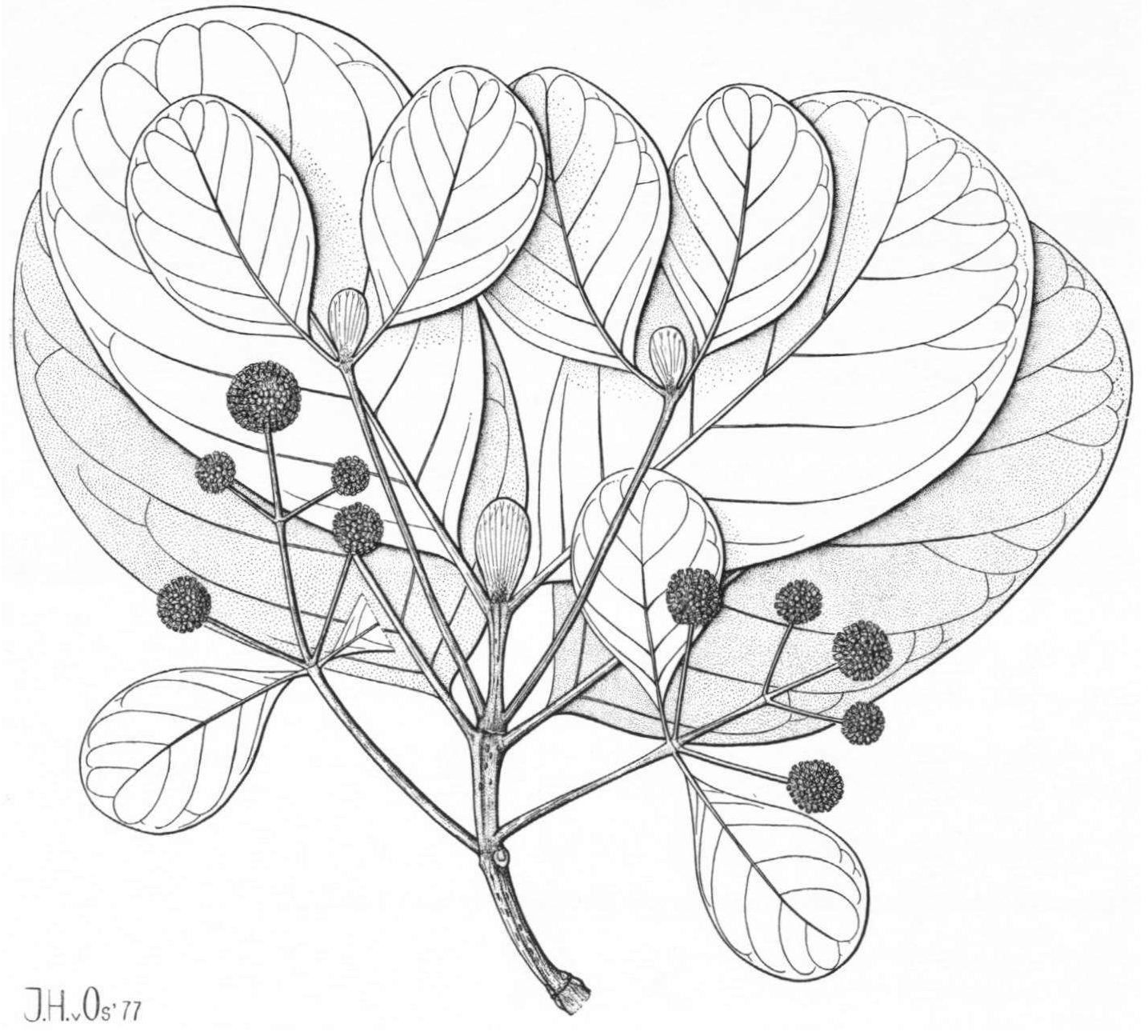
- Botanical illustration

Conservation status
- Near Threatened (IUCN 3.1)

Scientific classification
- Kingdom: Plantae
- Clade: Tracheophytes
- Clade: Angiosperms
- Clade: Eudicots
- Clade: Asterids
- Order: Gentianales
- Family: Rubiaceae
- Genus: Mitragyna
- Species: M. stipulosa

Binomial name
- Mitragyna stipulosa (DC.) Kuntze

Synonyms
- Adina ledermannii K.Krause; Adina stipulosa (DC.) Roberty; Fleroya ledermannii (K.Krause) Y.F.Deng; Fleroya stipulosa (DC.) Y.F.Deng; Hallea ledermannii (K.Krause) Verdc.; Hallea stipulosa (DC.) J.-F.Leroy; Mamboga stipulosa (DC.) Hiern; Mitragyna chevalieri K.Krause; Mitragyna ledermannii (K.Krause) Ridsdale; Mitragyna macrophylla Hiern, nom. illeg.; Nauclea bracteosa Welw.; Nauclea stipulosa DC.

= Mitragyna stipulosa =

Species of plant

Mitragyna stipulosa is a species of flowering plant in the family Rubiaceae. It is found in Angola, Cameroon, Central African Republic, the Republic of the Congo, the Democratic Republic of the Congo, Gabon, Gambia, Ghana, Guinea, Nigeria, Senegal, Sierra Leone, Sudan, Uganda, and Zambia. Its natural habitats are subtropical or tropical moist lowland forests and subtropical or tropical swamps. It is threatened by habitat loss.

== Phytochemicals ==
Mitragyna stipulosa leaf contains the alkaloids Mitraphylline, rotundifoline, isorotundifoline, rhynchophylline and isorhynchophylline.
