= C22H26N2O3 =

The molecular formula C_{22}H_{26}N_{2}O_{3} may refer to:

- Geissoschizine methyl ether
- Hirsuteine
- 16-Methoxytabersonine
- Pseudoakuammigine
