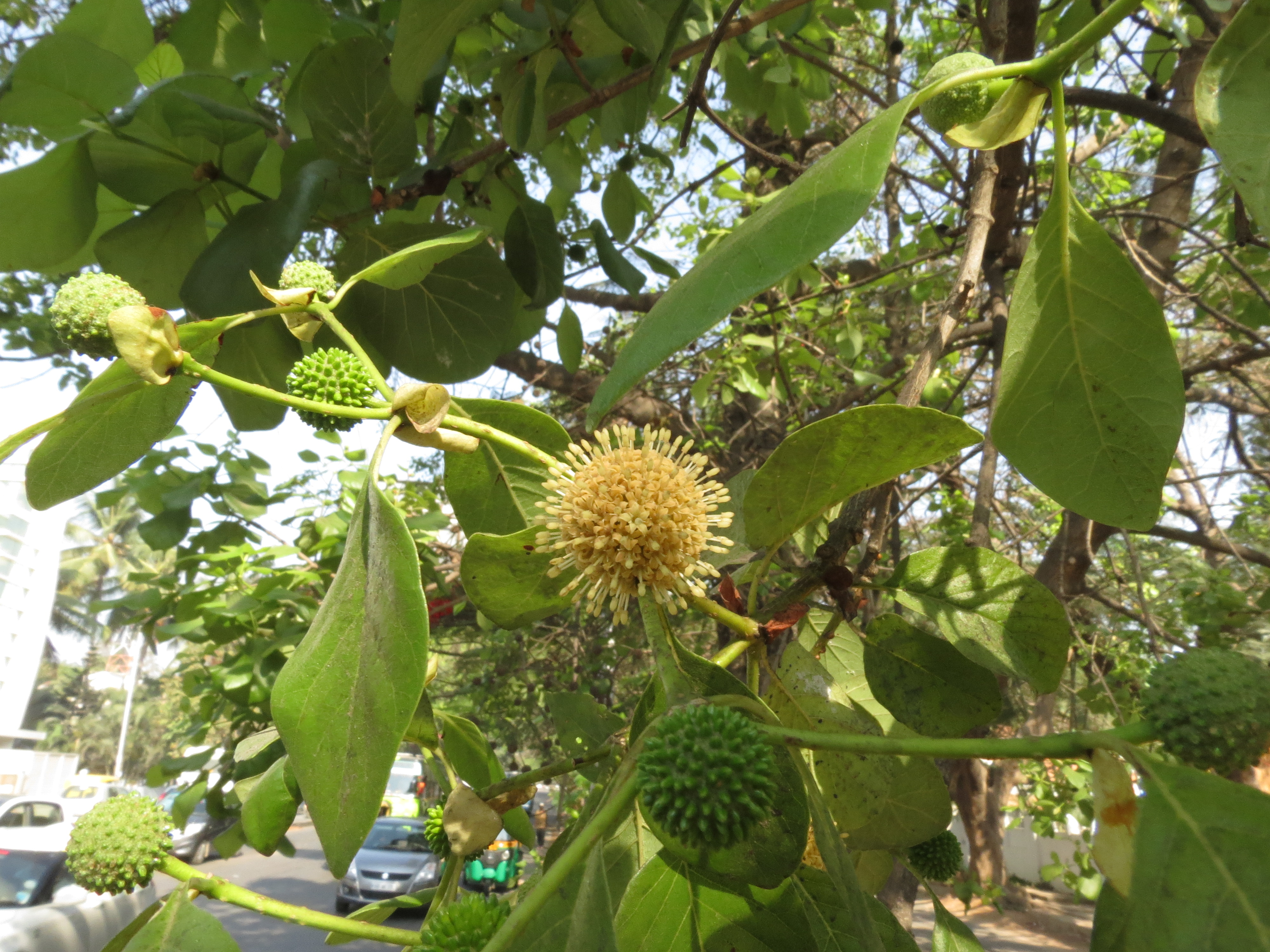
- Flower seen in Bengaluru

Conservation status
- Least Concern (IUCN 3.1)

Scientific classification
- Kingdom: Plantae
- Clade: Tracheophytes
- Clade: Angiosperms
- Clade: Eudicots
- Clade: Asterids
- Order: Gentianales
- Family: Rubiaceae
- Genus: Mitragyna
- Species: M. parvifolia

Binomial name
- Mitragyna parvifolia (Roxb.) Korth.

Varieties
- Mitragyna parvifolia var. microphylla (Kurz) Ridsdale; Mitragyna parvifolia var. parvifolia

Synonyms
- Nauclea parvifolia Roxb.; Stephegyne parvifolia (Roxb.) Korth.

= Mitragyna parvifolia =

Species of tree

Mitragyna parvifolia is a tree species found in Asia, native to India, Nepal, Sri Lanka, Bangladesh, Myanmar, and Cambodia. Mitragyna species are used medicinally and for their fine timber throughout the areas where they grow. M. parvifolia reaches heights of 50 feet with a branch spread over 15 feet. The stem is erect and branching. Flowers are yellow and grow in ball-shaped clusters. Leaves are a dark green in color, smooth, rounded in shape, and opposite in growth pattern.

== Traditional uses ==
Mitragyna parvifolia fresh leaf sap is used by the tribals in treatment of jaundice in the Chenchus, Yerukalas, Yanadis and Sugalis of Gundur District, Andhra Pradesh. Its leaves alleviate pain and swelling, and are used for better healing from wounds and ulcers. Its stem bark is used in treatment of biliousness and muscular pains by the local inhabitant of Tumkur district, Karnataka, India. The tribals of Sonaghati of Sonbhadra district, Uttar Pradesh heal fever by a decoction of the M. parvifolia bark. Valaiyans tribe, population of Sirumalai hills, Madurai district, Western Ghats, Tamil Nadu use stem bark for rheumatic pain. The bark and roots are used to treat fever, colic, muscular pain, burning sensation, poisoning, gynecological disorders, cough, and edema, and as an aphrodisiac. The fruit juice augments the quantities of breast milk in lactating mothers and also works as lactodepurant.

The caterpillars of the commander (Limenitis procris), a brush-footed butterfly, use this species as a food plant.

== In religion and culture ==
According to ancient literature, this is the 'true Kadam' which is associated with Lord Krishna in Vrindavana, rather than the well-known tree Neolamarckia cadamba. But this is definitely a case of mistaken identity. Neolamarckia cadamba is not found naturally in the hot, dry Vrindavana region. M. parviflora is not only native to the Vrindavana forests but is their dominant tree. Interestingly, M. parviflora are still found almost everywhere in Vrindavana.

An excerpt from Jayadeva's Gita Govinda, Radha referencing the flowers of this tree:

He had the heavy milkmaids dance about

the red kadambas of his smiles and kisses:

In my heart I still see Hari dance

in playful merriment and scorn of me.

It's also found in Sangam Literature. D. Stephen, a Botany professor at The American College, notes that forests in the Sangam landscape naturally host only the Mitragyna parvifolia species of Kadamba, while other related species appear to be introduced or cultivated. From his assessment, this pattern points to Mitragyna being the Kadamba species originally belonging to the area.

== Phytochemicals ==
Mitragyna parvifolia contains the alkaloids Dihydrocorynantheol, dihydrocorynantheol-N-oxide, akuammigine, akuammigine-N-oxide, 3-isoajmalicine, mitraphylline, isomitraphylline, rhynchophylline, isorhynchophylline, rotundifoline, isorotundifoline, speciophylline-N-oxide, uncarine F, uncarine F-N-oxide, pteropodine, isopteropodine, uncarine D (speciophylline), 16,17-dihydro-17β-hydroxy isomitraphylline, 16,17-dihydro-17β-hydroxy-mitraphylline, and mitragynine.

== Gallery ==
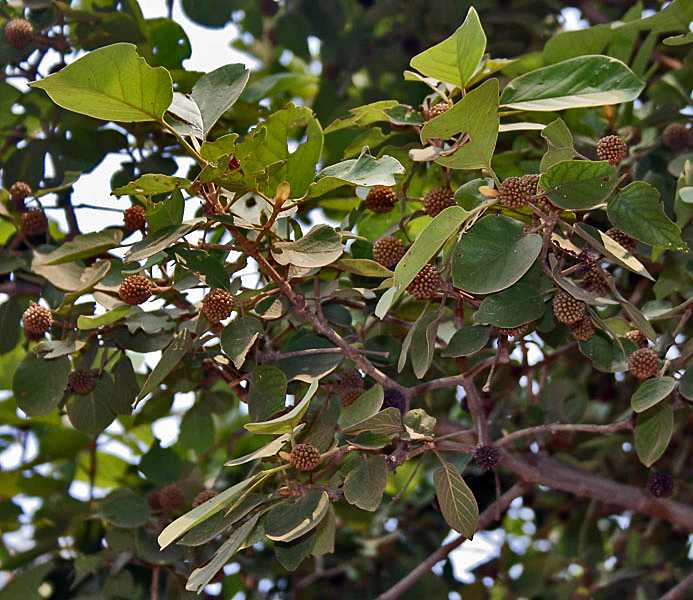
At Hodal in Faridabad district of Haryana, India

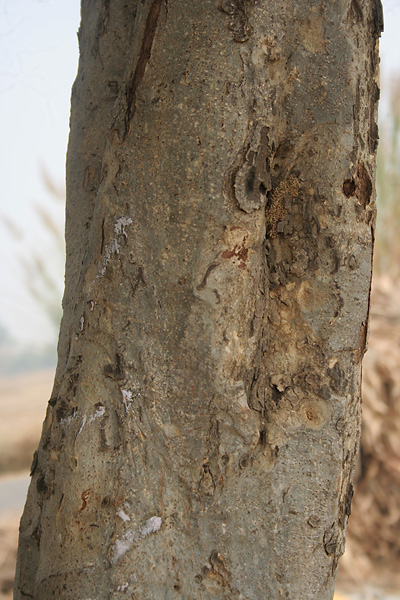
Trunk at Hodal in Faridabad district of Haryana, India

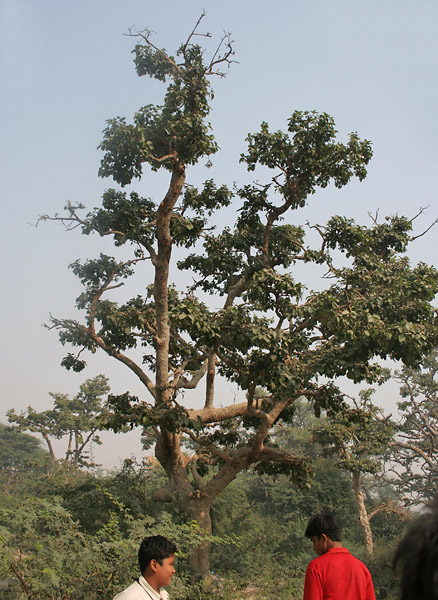
Old tree at Hodal in Faridabad district of Haryana, India

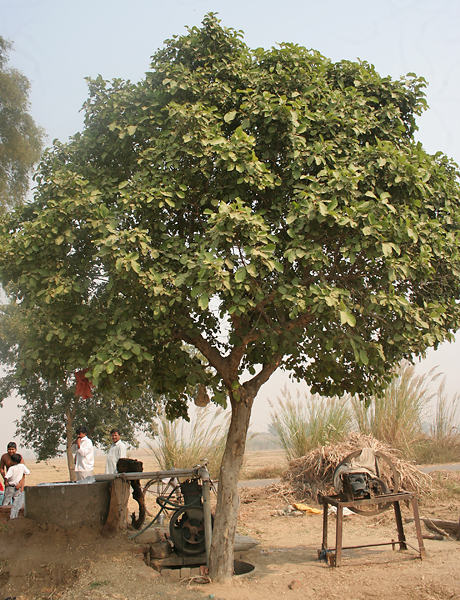
Young tree at Hodal in Faridabad district of Haryana, India

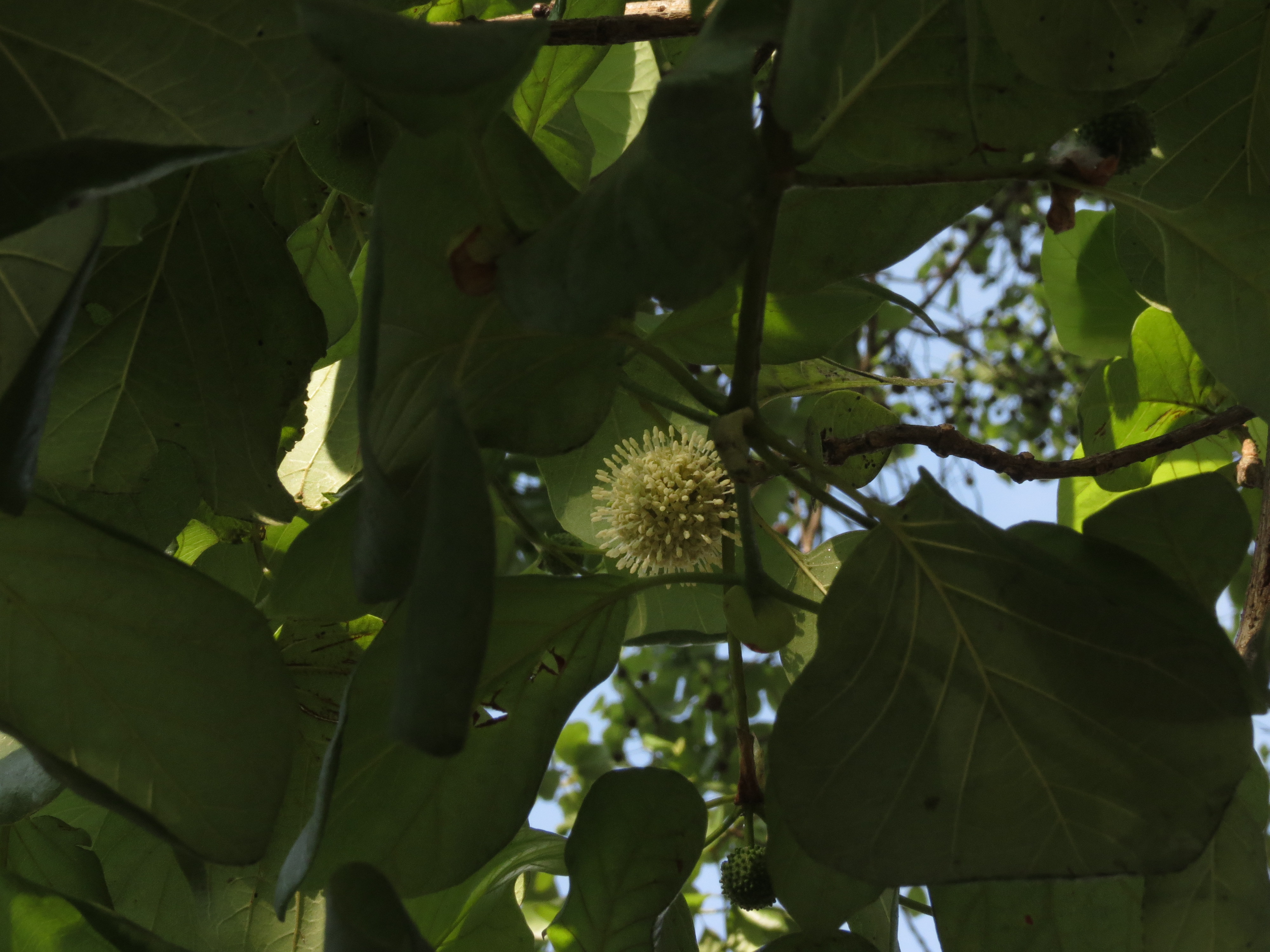

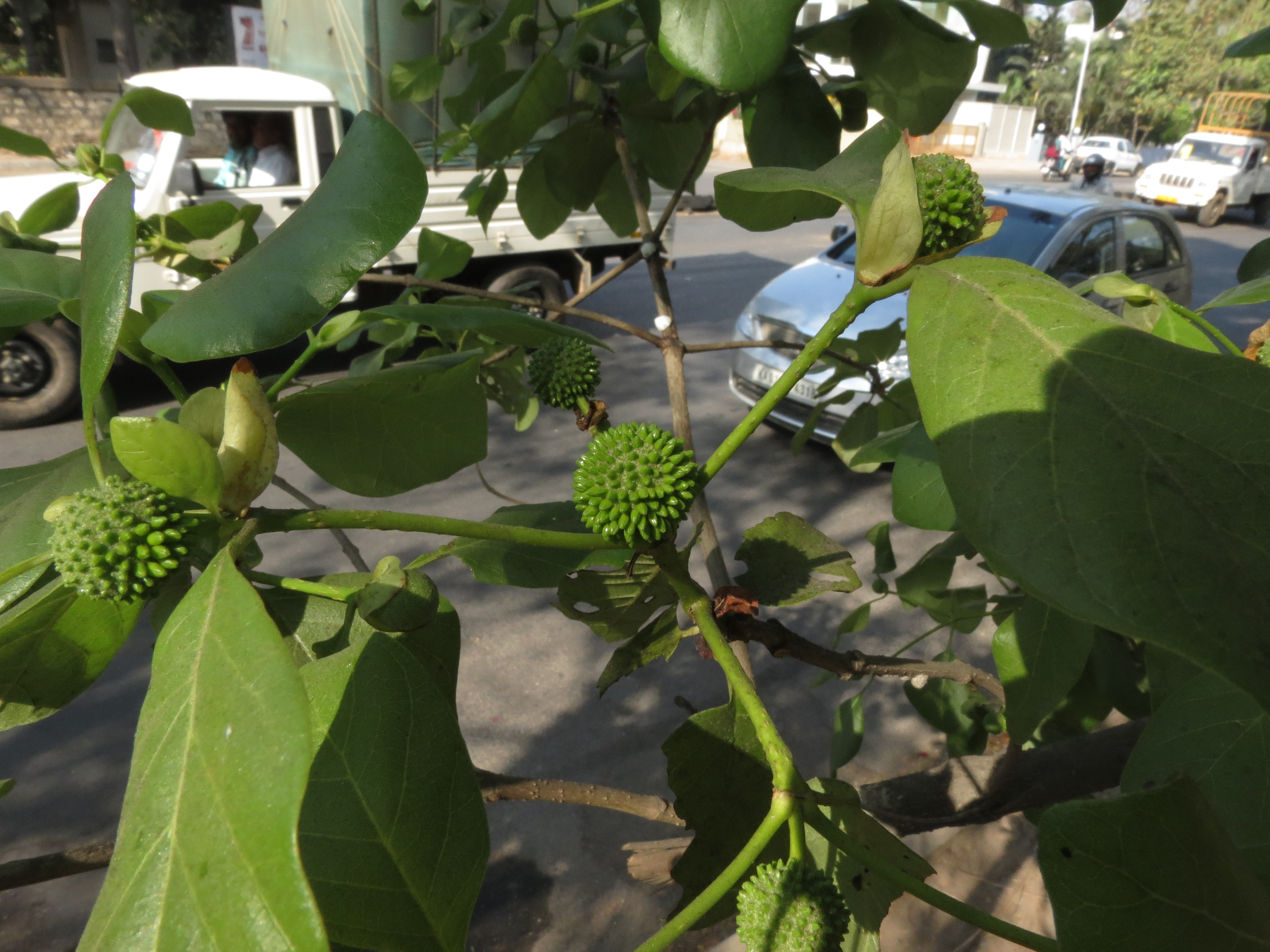

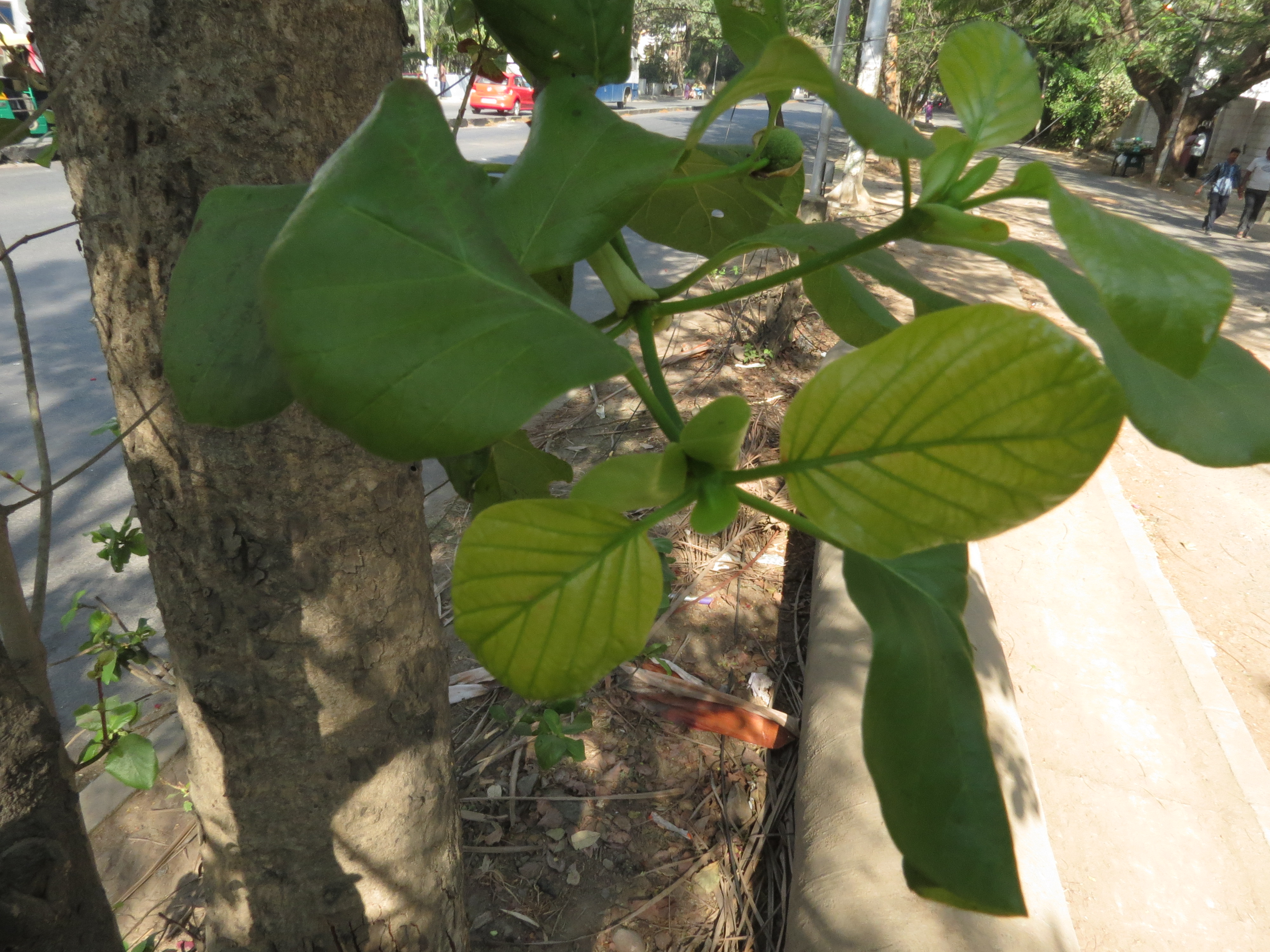

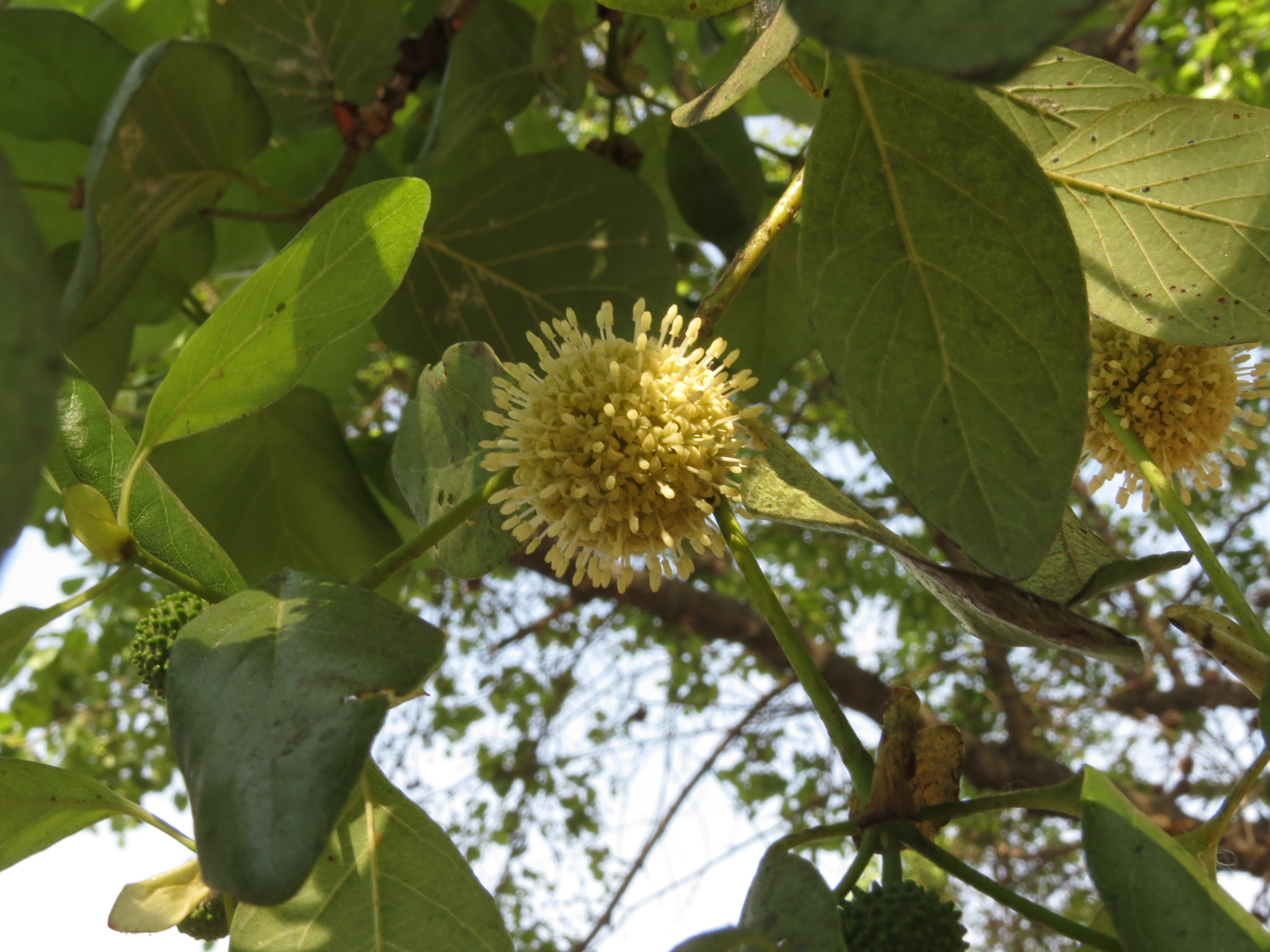

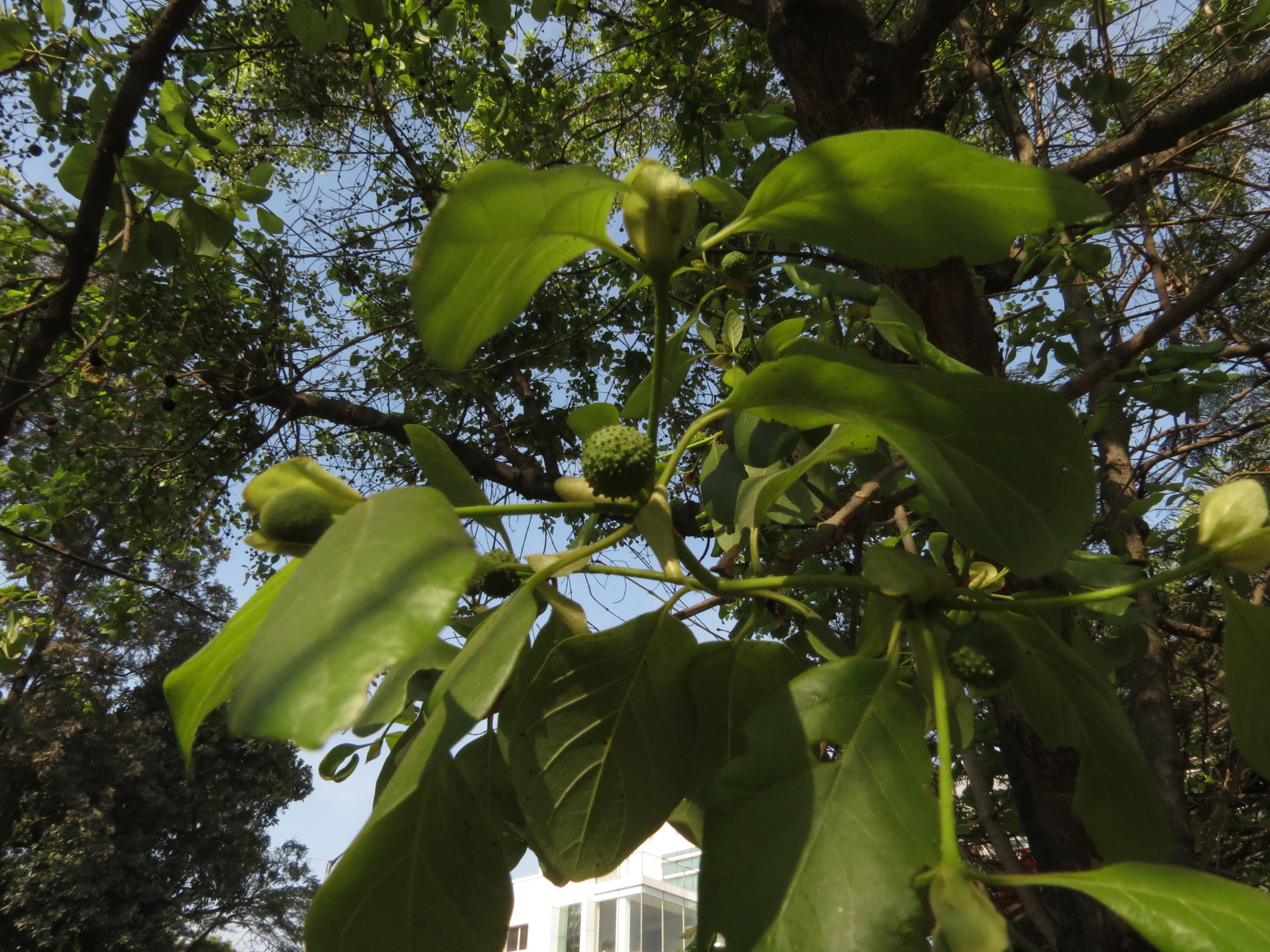

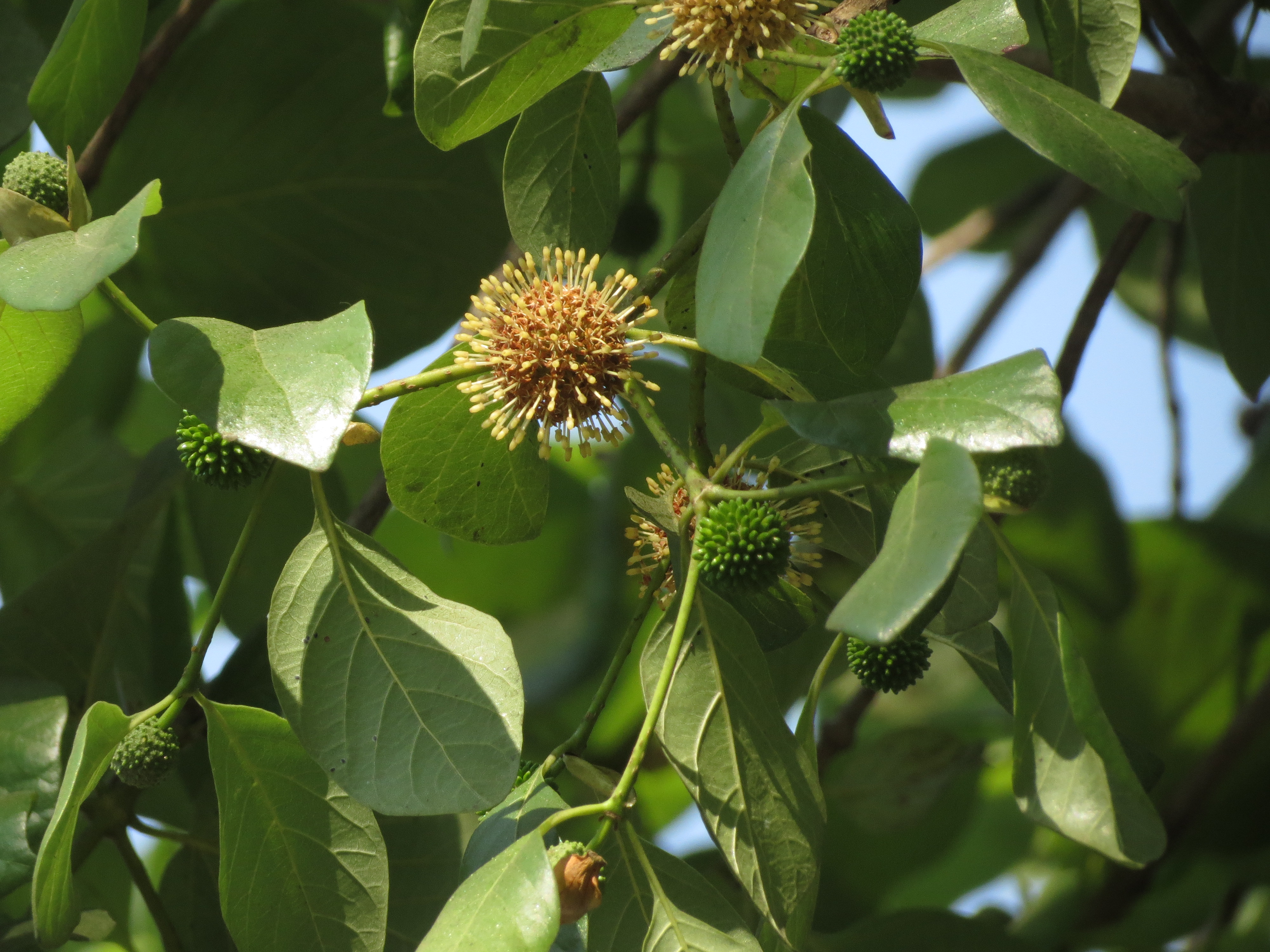

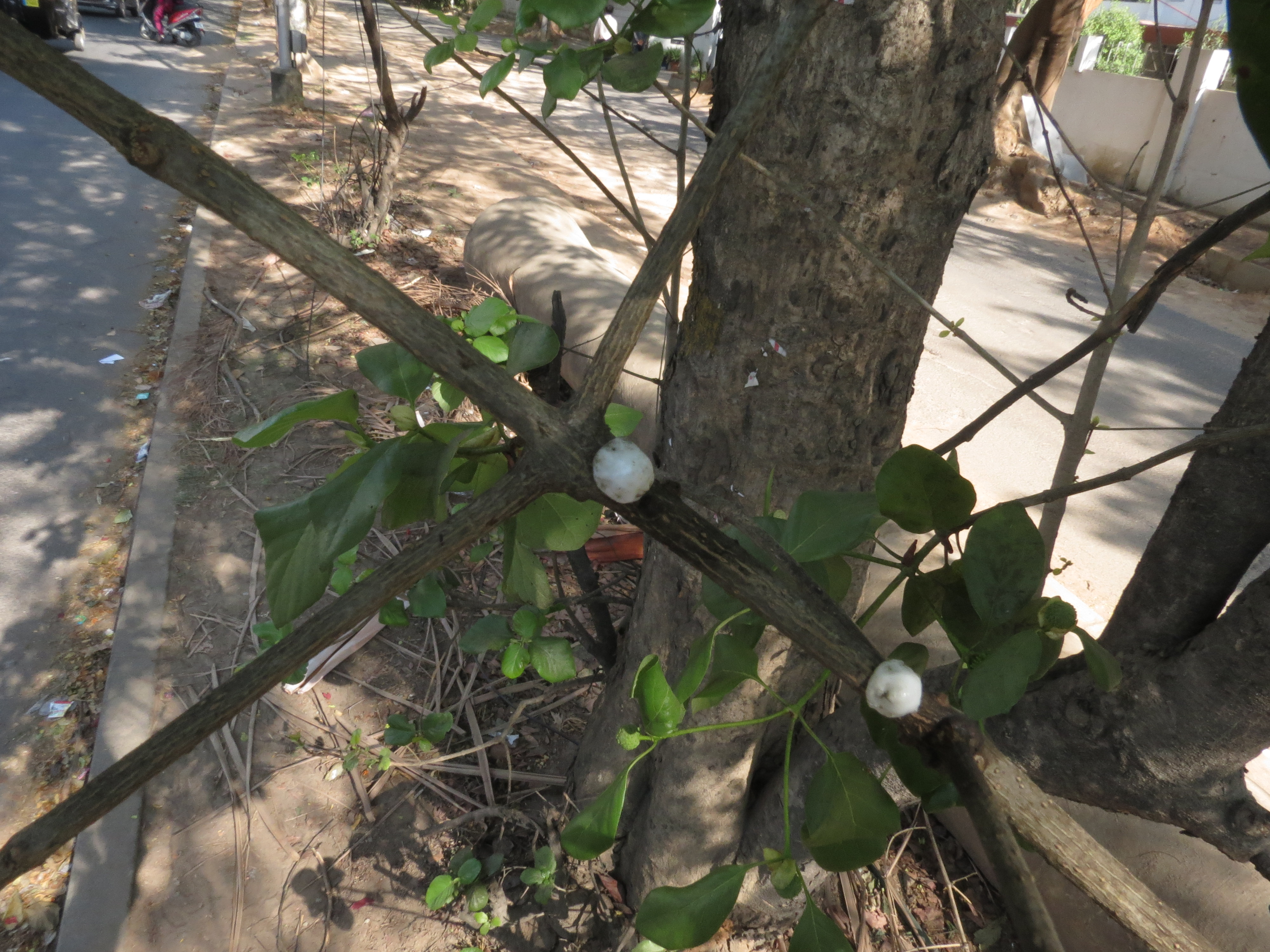

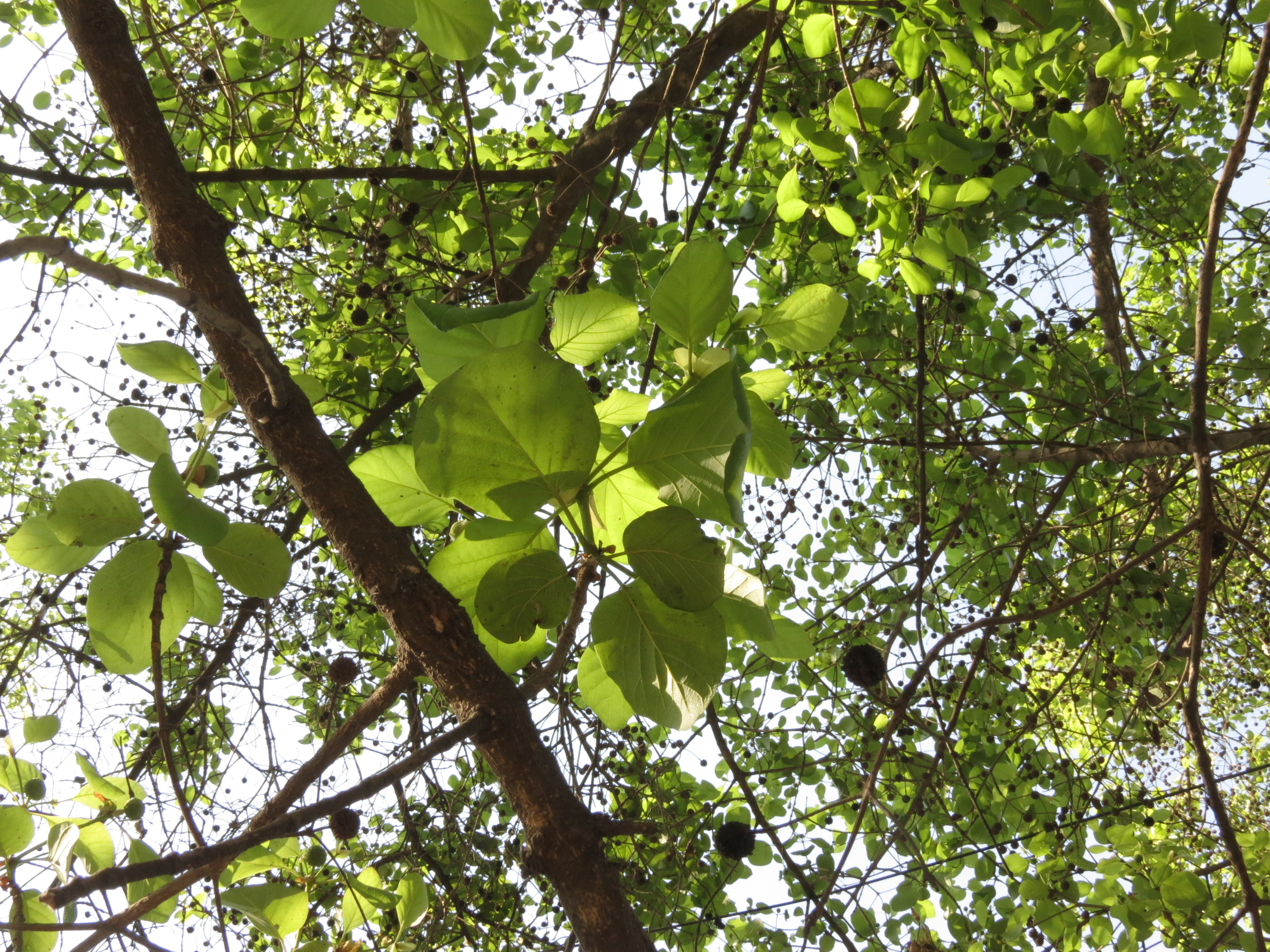
