= Mitragyna ciliata =

Scientific classification
- Kingdom: Plantae
- Clade: Tracheophytes
- Clade: Angiosperms
- Clade: Eudicots
- Clade: Asterids
- Order: Gentianales
- Family: Rubiaceae
- Genus: Mitragyna
- Species: M. ciliata

Binomial name
- Mitragyna ciliata Aubrév. & Pellegr.

Synonyms
- Hallea ciliata (Aubrév. & Pellegr.) J.-F.Leroy

Species of plant

Mitragyna ciliata is a species of flowering plant, a tree in the Gardenia Family (Rubiaceae), native to the rainforests of west and west-central tropical Africa. It was first described in 1936. It root structure is curious; the roots leave the ground in a smooth arc, then re-enter to make a subsurface arc, which is then repeated several times.

== Phytochemicals ==
Mitragyna ciliata leaf contains the alkaloids rotundifoline, isorotundifoline, rhynchophylline, isorhynchophylline, ciliaphylline, rhynchociline and mitraciliatine.
