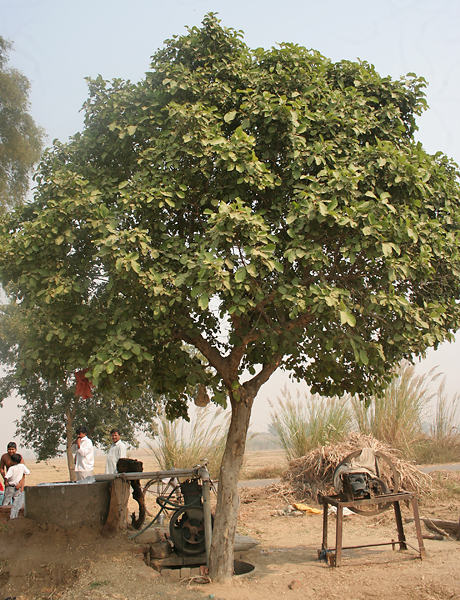
- Mitragyna parvifolia

Scientific classification
- Kingdom: Plantae
- Clade: Tracheophytes
- Clade: Angiosperms
- Clade: Eudicots
- Clade: Asterids
- Order: Gentianales
- Family: Rubiaceae
- Subfamily: Cinchonoideae
- Tribe: Naucleeae
- Genus: Mitragyna; Korth.

Type species
- Mitragyna parvifolia (Roxb.) Korth.

Synonyms
- Fleroya Y.F.Deng; Hallea J.-F.Leroy; Mamboga Blanco; Paradina Pierre ex Pit.; Stephegyne Korth.

= Mitragyna =

Genus of plants

Mitragyna is a genus of trees in the family Rubiaceae found in the tropical and subtropical regions of Asia and Africa. Members of this genus contain antimalarial and analgesic indole alkaloids.

The genus name refers to the mitre-shaped stigma (Greek mitra = headband and gyne = women).

== Species ==
As of February 2026, Plants of the World Online accepted the following species:

- Mitragyna ciliata Aubrév. & Pellegr. — Afrotropics
- Mitragyna diversifolia (Wall. ex G.Don) Havil. (syn. Mitragyna javanica Koord. & Valeton) — Indomalaya
- Mitragyna hirsuta Havil. — China and Mainland Southeast Asia
- Mitragyna inermis (Willd.) Kuntze — Afrotropics
- Mitragyna parvifolia (Roxb.) Korth. — Indomalaya
- Mitragyna rotundifolia (Roxb.) Kuntze — China and Mainland Southeast Asia
- Mitragyna rubrostipulata (K.Schum.) Havil. — Afrotropics
- Mitragyna speciosa (Korth.) Havil. — Indomalaya
- Mitragyna stipulosa (DC.) Kuntze (syn. Mitragyna ledermannii (K.Krause) Ridsdale) — Afrotropics
- Mitragyna tubulosa (Arn.) K.Schum. — India, Sri Lanka

== Image gallery ==
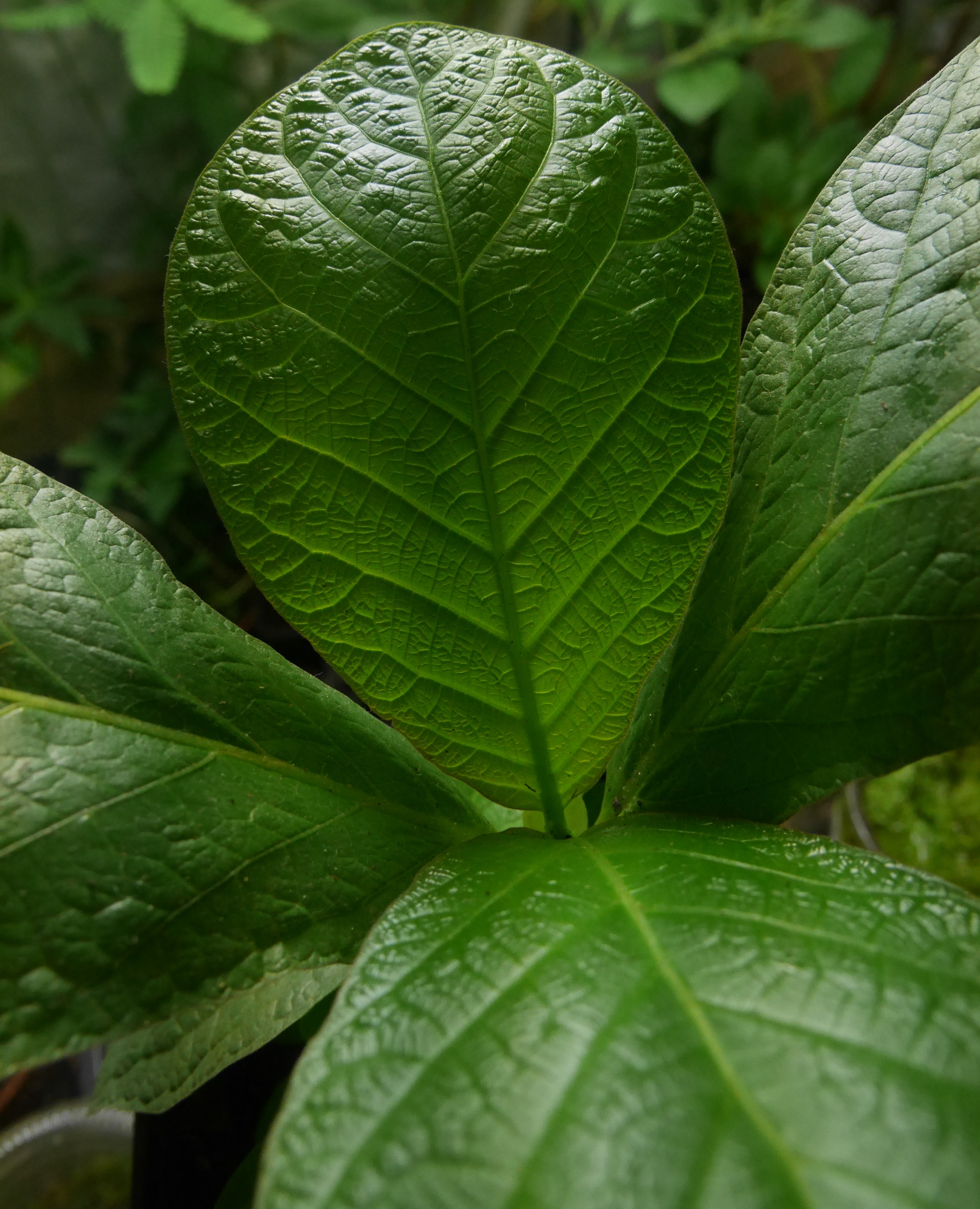
Mitragyna hirsuta

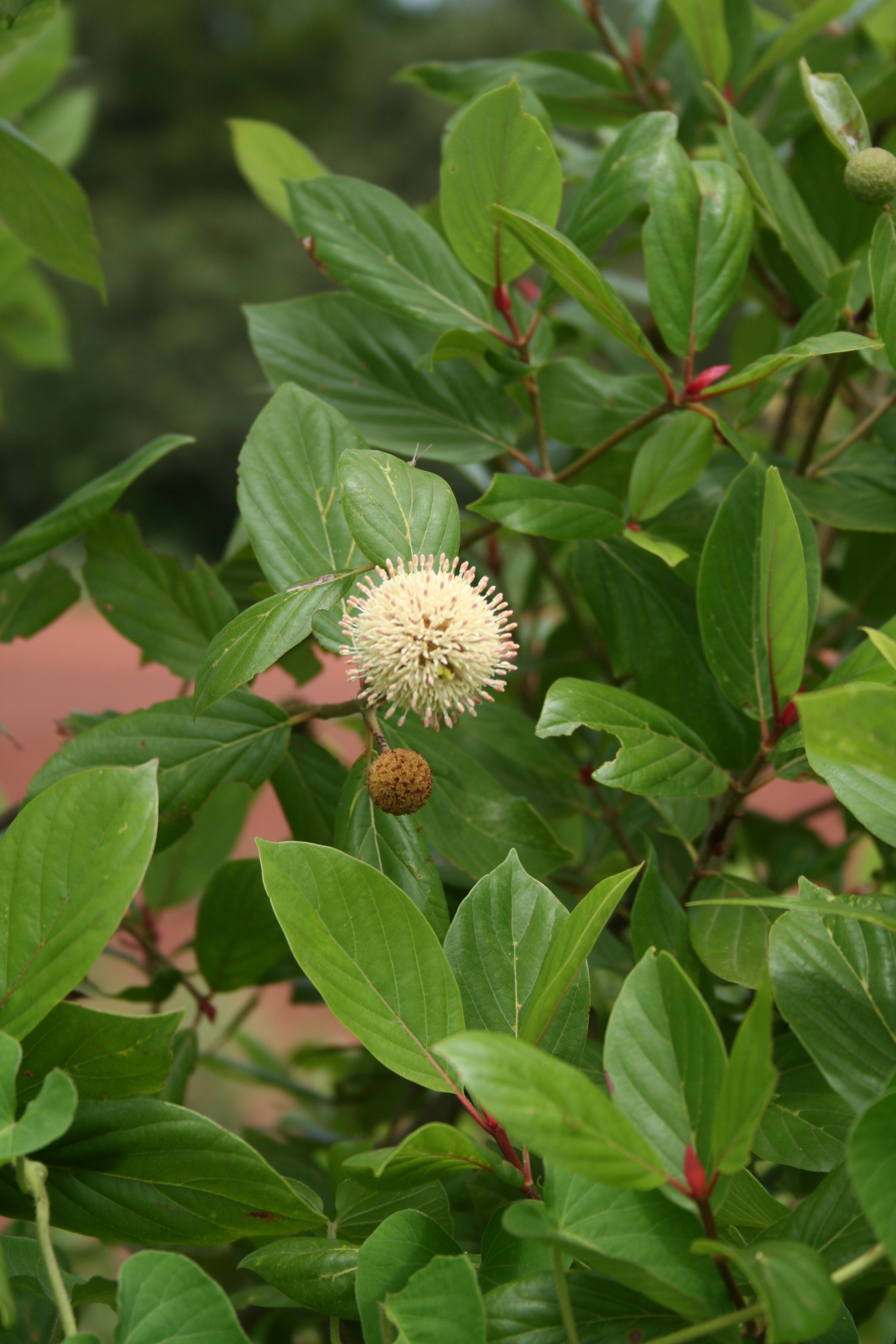
Mitragyna inermis

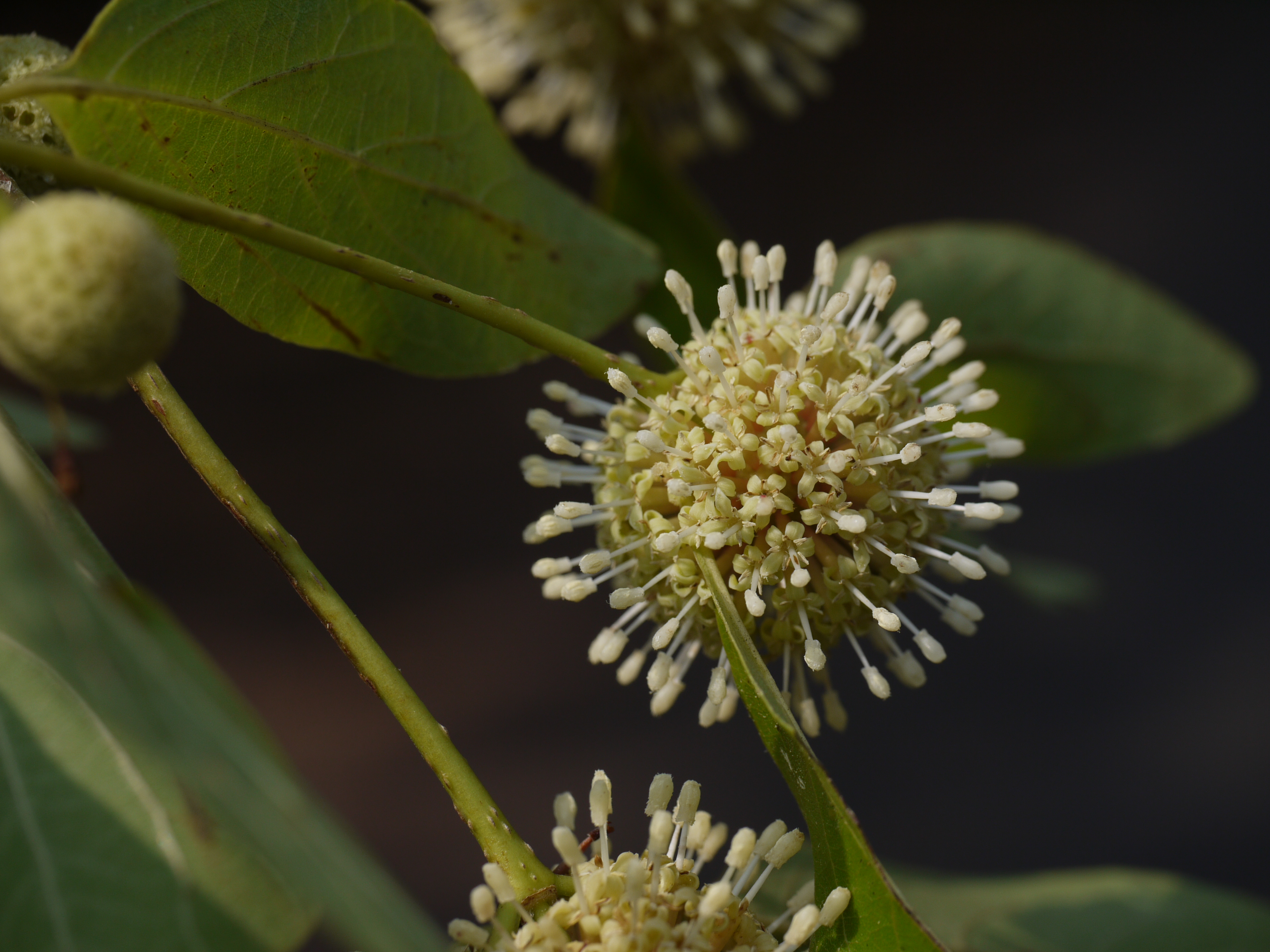
Mitragyna parvifolia

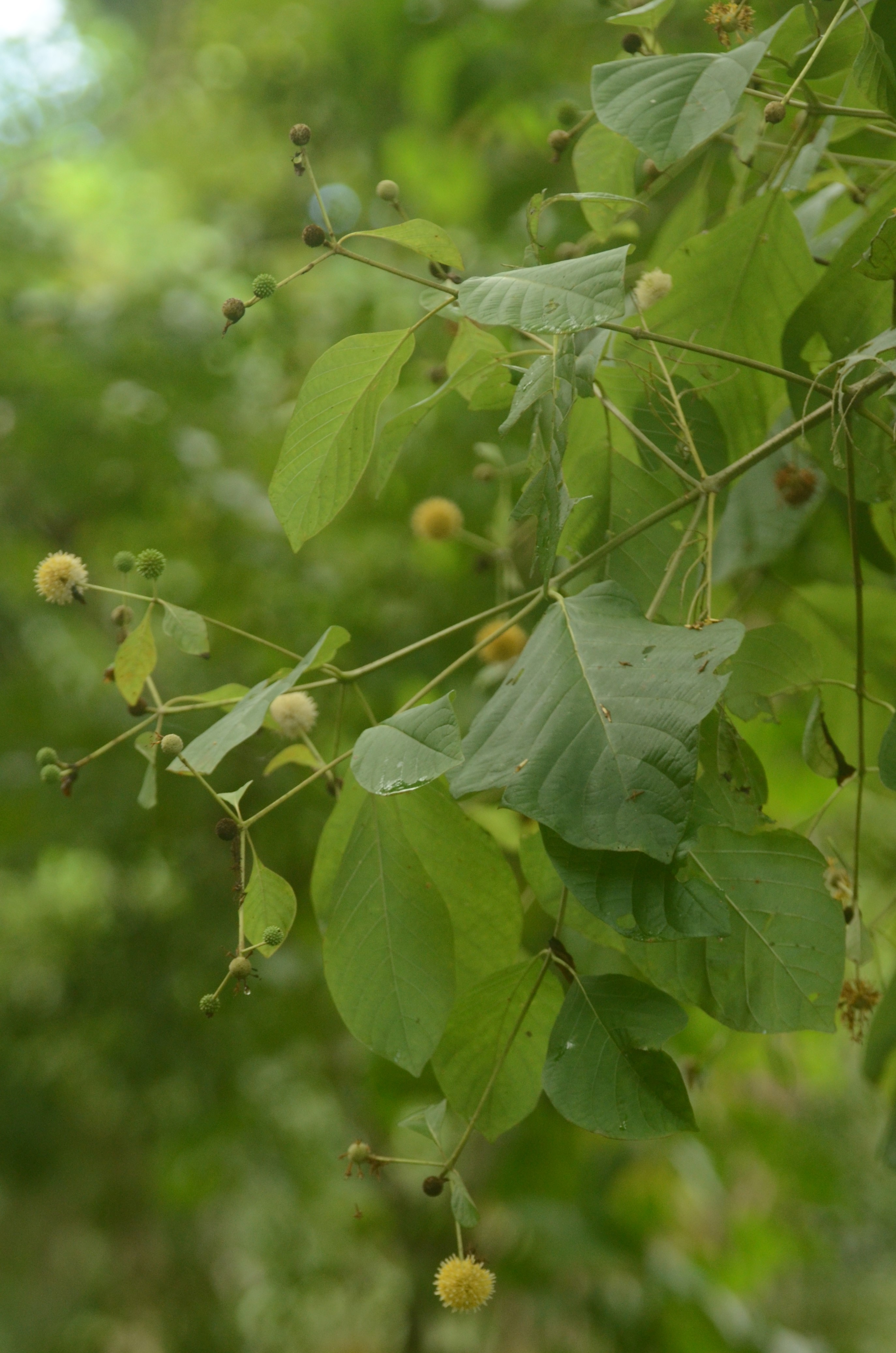
Mitragyna rotundifolia
