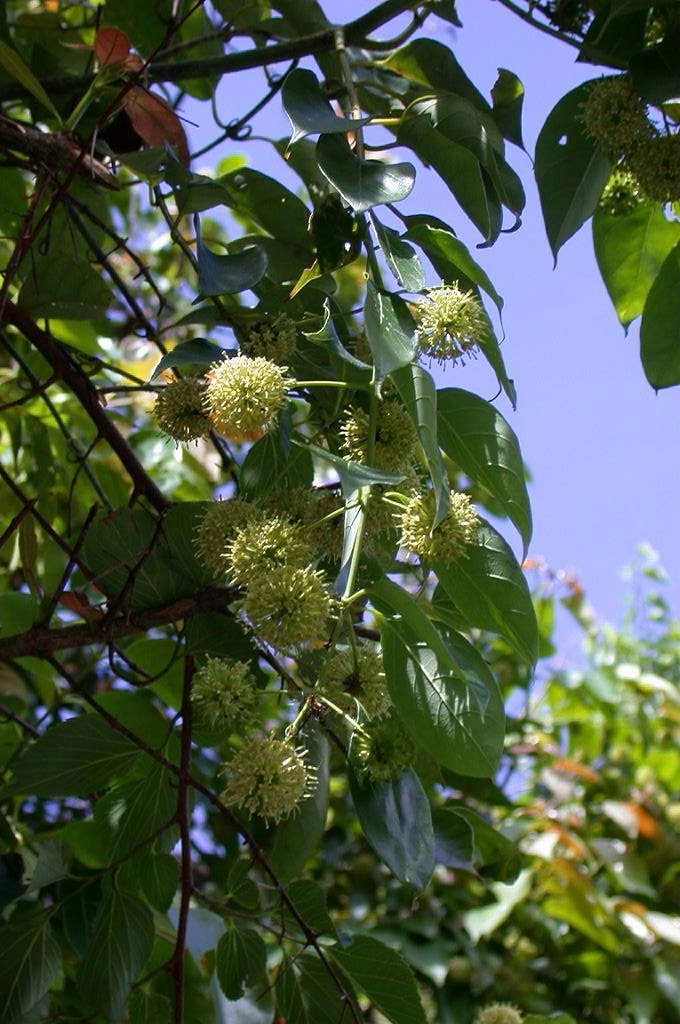

Scientific classification
- Kingdom: Plantae
- Clade: Tracheophytes
- Clade: Angiosperms
- Clade: Eudicots
- Clade: Asterids
- Order: Gentianales
- Family: Rubiaceae
- Genus: Uncaria
- Species: U. rhynchophylla

Binomial name
- Uncaria rhynchophylla (Miq.) Jacks., 1897

= Uncaria rhynchophylla =

Species of plant

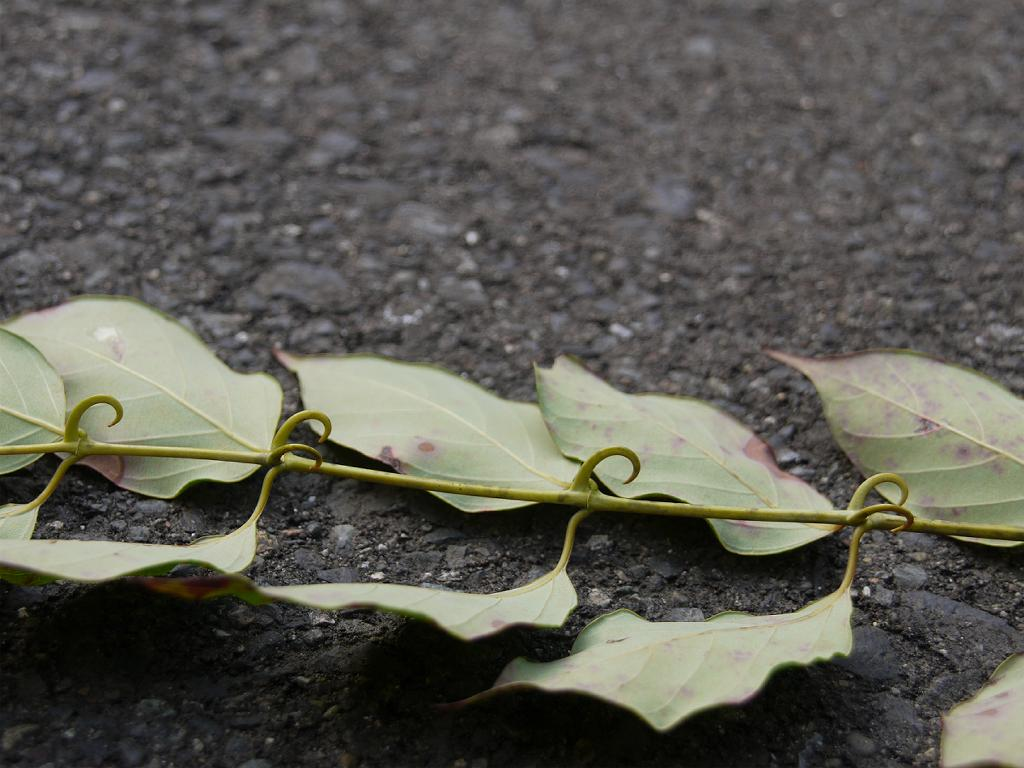
Leaves

Uncaria rhynchophylla (simplified Chinese: 钓钩藤; traditional Chinese: 釣鉤藤; pinyin: diào gōu téng; lit. 'fish hook vine') or the cat's claw herb is a plant species used in traditional Chinese medicine.

(+)-Catechin and (-)-epicatechin are found in the plant as well as the alkaloid rhynchophylline.
