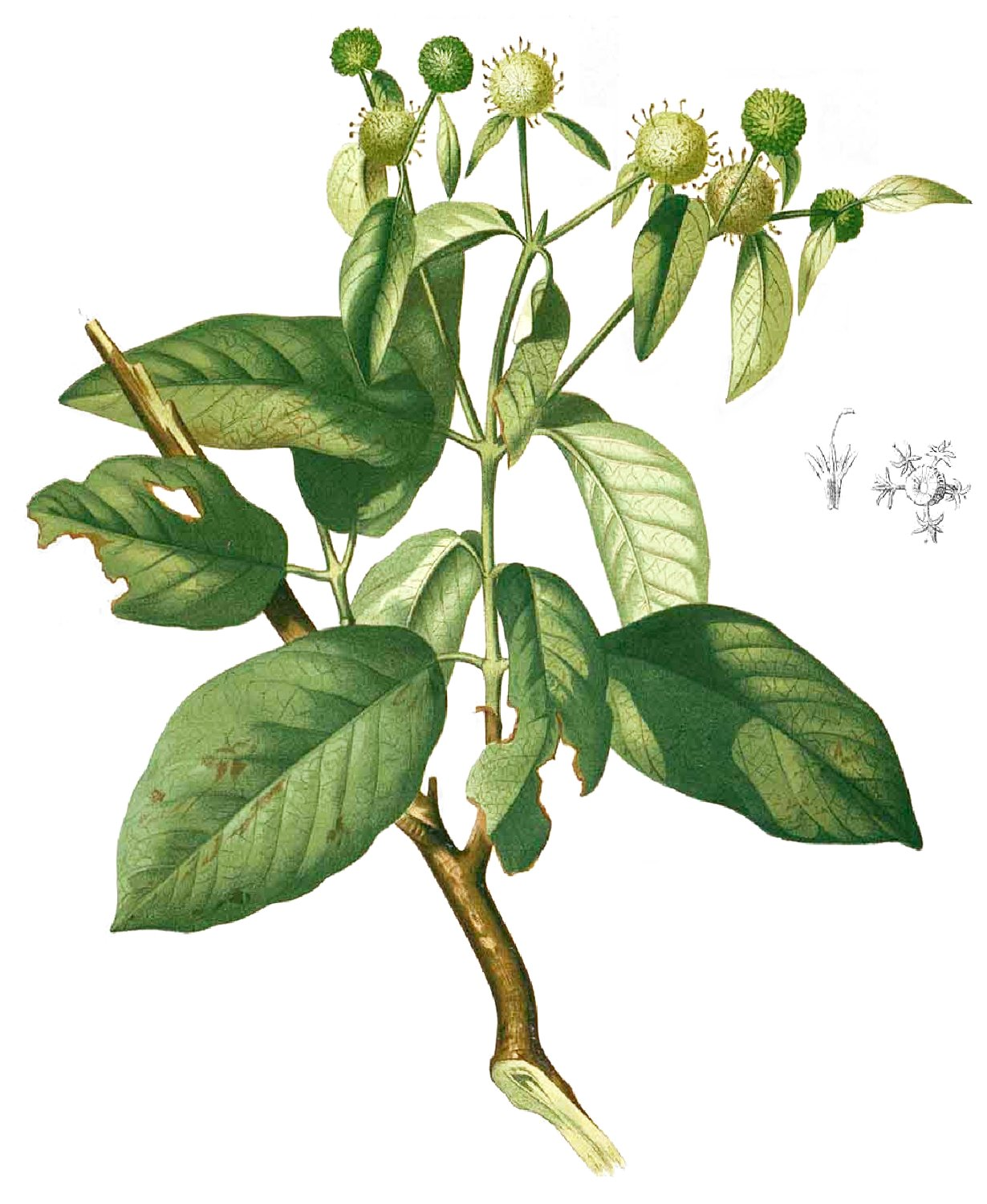
- Illustrated as "Stephegyne diversifolia"

Scientific classification
- Kingdom: Plantae
- Clade: Tracheophytes
- Clade: Angiosperms
- Clade: Eudicots
- Clade: Asterids
- Order: Gentianales
- Family: Rubiaceae
- Genus: Mitragyna
- Species: M. diversifolia

Binomial name
- Mitragyna diversifolia (Wall. ex G.Don) Havil.

Synonyms
- Stephegyne tubulosa Fern.-Vill. Stephegyne parvifolia Vidal; Stephegyne diversifolia (Wall. ex G.Don) Hook.f. Stephegyne diversifolia (Wall. ex G.Don) Brandis; Nauclea diversifolia Wall. ex G.Don; Nauclea adina Blanco; Mitragyna javanica Koord. & Valeton; Mamboga capitata Blanco

= Mitragyna diversifolia =

Species of plant

Mitragyna diversifolia, also known as Mitragyna javanica, is a tree species found in Asia, belonging to the family Rubiaceae, and closely related to Mitragyna speciosa (kratom). Although it shares many known alkaloids with other trees in its family, several alkaloids are unique to Mitragyna javanica including mitrajavine and 3-isoajmalicine. The Catalogue of Life lists no subspecies.

== Description ==
Mitragyna diversifolia is a deciduous under-story tree, that reaches up to 15 m in height. The branches are angled and cylindrical. The leaves are ovate-oblong to elliptic-ovate, averaging 146 × 93 mm in size, obtuse apex to shortly acuminate. The yellow corolla has white lobes. The fruit in the form of a capsule of 3–4 mm.

== Distribution ==
It is distributed through the forests of China (Yunnan), Cambodia, Indonesia, Laos, Burma, the Philippines, Thailand and Vietnam.

== Uses ==
The genus mitragyna has been used traditionally to alleviate symptoms of fever, coughing, diarrhea, muscular pain and deworming, although antioxidant and antimicrobial properties have also been found. Typically these are consumed as a whole leaf or powder form, although gel-capsules, containing powder, are also used. Mitragyna diversifolia has been shown to possess pharmacological antidiarrheal properties, as well as analgesic properties.

== Phytochemicals ==
Mitragyna diversifolia leaf contains the alkaloids 7-hydroxy-isopaynantheine, 3-dehydro-paynantheine, 3-isopaynantheine-N(4)- oxide, mitrafoline, mitradiversifoline, specionoxeine-N(4)-oxide, specionoxeine-N(4)-oxide.

== Gallery ==
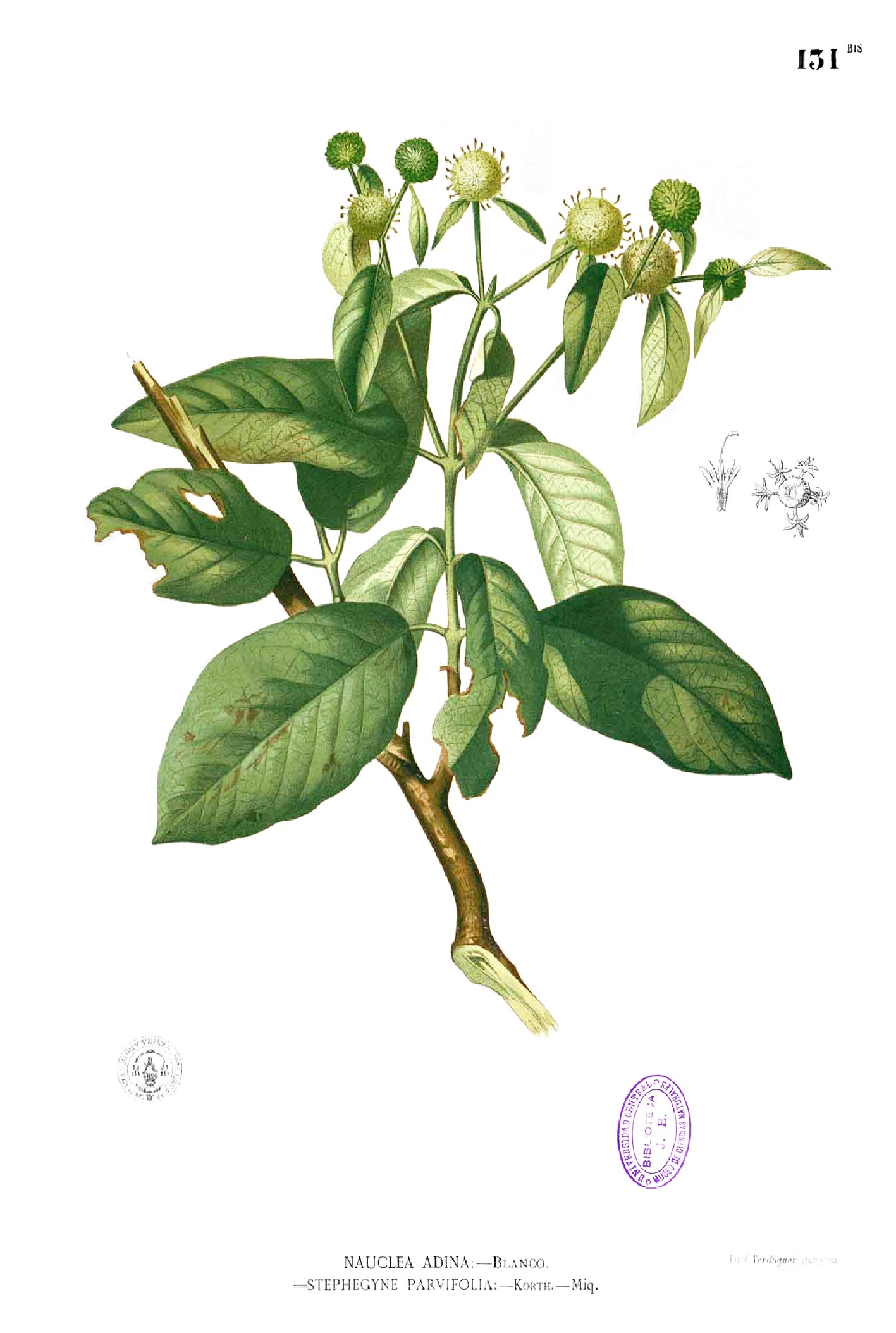
