= Geissoschizine methyl ether =

Names
- Preferred IUPAC name Methyl (2Z)-2-[(2S,3E,12bS)-3-ethylidene-1,2,3,4,6,7,12,12b-octahydroindolo[2,3-a]quinolizin-2-yl]-3-methoxyprop-2-enoate

Identifiers
CAS Number	60314-89-8
3D model (JSmol)	Interactive image
ChemSpider	4947088
PubChem CID	6443046
UNII	TNN2THT2NX
CompTox Dashboard (EPA)	DTXSID101045604
- InChI: InChI=1S/C22H26N2O3/c1-4-14-12-24-10-9-16-15-7-5-6-8-19(15)23-21(16)20(24)11-17(14)18(13-26-2)22(25)27-3/h4-8,13,17,20,23H,9-12H2,1-3H3/b14-4-,18-13-/t17-,20-/m0/s1 Key: VAMJZLUOKJRHOW-XEASWFAXSA-N
- SMILES: C/C=C\1/CN2CCC3=C([C@@H]2C[C@@H]1/C(=C/OC)/C(=O)OC)NC4=CC=CC=C34

Properties
Chemical formula	C_{22}H_{26}N_{2}O_{3}
Molar mass	366.461 g·mol^{−1}
- Except where otherwise noted, data are given for materials in their standard state (at 25 °C [77 °F], 100 kPa). Infobox references

Geissoschizine methyl ether is an alkaloid contained in the kampo medicine Yokukansan. Geissoschizine methyl ether has an antagonistic effect on 5-HT_{7} receptors.
