= Uncaria tomentosa =

Scientific classification
- Kingdom: Plantae
- Clade: Embryophytes
- Clade: Tracheophytes
- Clade: Angiosperms
- Clade: Eudicots
- Clade: Asterids
- Order: Gentianales
- Family: Rubiaceae
- Genus: Uncaria
- Species: U. tomentosa

Binomial name
- Uncaria tomentosa (Willd. ex Schult.) DC.

Species of plant

Uncaria tomentosa is a woody vine found in the tropical jungles of South and Central America. It is known as cat's claw or uña de gato in Spanish because of its claw-shaped thorns. The plant root bark is used in herbalism for a variety of ailments, and is sold as a dietary supplement. There is no high-quality clinical evidence that it has any benefit for treating human diseases.

== Description ==
Uncaria tomentosa is a liana deriving its name from hook-like thorns that resemble the claws of a cat. U. tomentosa can grow to a length of up to 30 m (100 ft), climbing by means of these thorns. The leaves are elliptic with a smooth edge, and grow in opposing pairs. Cat's claw is indigenous to the Amazon rainforest, with its habitat being restricted primarily to the tropical areas of South and Central America.

== Taxonomy ==
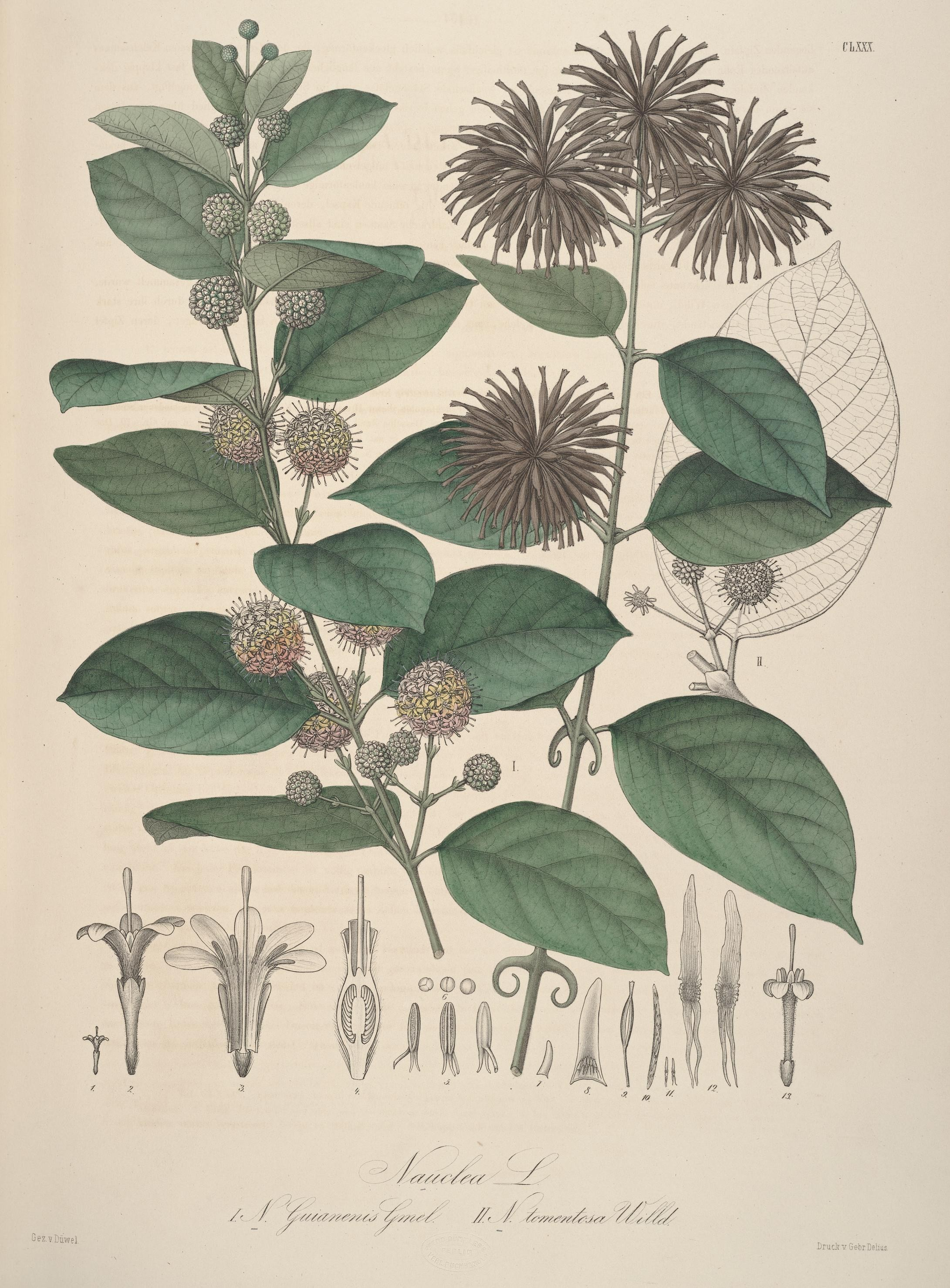
Pl. CLXXX Florae Columbiae with U. tomentosa on the right.

There are two species of cat's claw commonly used in North America and Europe, Uncaria tomentosa and Uncaria guianensis, having different properties and uses. The two are frequently confused but U. tomentosa is the more commonly used in traditional medicine. U. tomentosa is further divided into two chemotypes that remain under preliminary research for their properties and compounds. There are other plants which are known as cat's claw (or uña de gato) in Mexico and Latin America; however, they are entirely different plant species, belonging to neither the genus Uncaria, nor to the family Rubiaceae.

== Phytochemicals ==
Phytochemicals in Uncaria tomentosa root bark include oxindole and indole alkaloids, glycosides, organic acids, proanthocyanidins, sterols, and triterpenes, glycosides, tannins, polyphenols, catechins, rhynchophylline, and beta-sitosterol.

== Traditional medicine ==
Cat's claw bark has been used as a traditional medicine in South America countries over centuries for its supposed health benefits, and is a common herbal supplement. There is no high-quality clinical evidence that it has any benefit in treating human diseases.

== Interactions ==
Cat's claw has extensive interactions with numerous prescription drugs. Its safety over long-term use or during pregnancy has not been scientifically determined.

== Adverse effects ==
Individuals allergic to plants in the family Rubiaceae and different species of Uncaria may be more likely to have adverse reactions to cat's claw. Allergic reactions can include itching, rash, and skin inflammation. Gastrointestinal discomfort, nausea, headache, impaired kidney and hormonal effects, and neuropathy are other possible effects.

People requiring anticoagulation, blood pressure, or immune therapy should not use cat's claw.

== See also ==
- List of ineffective cancer treatments
