= Hirsuteine =

Names
- IUPAC name Methyl (16E)-17-methoxy-3β-coryna-16,18-diene-16-carboxylate
- Systematic IUPAC name Methyl (2E)-2-[(2S,3R,12bR)-3-ethenyl-1,2,3,4,6,7,12,12b-octahydroindolo[2,3-a]quinolizin-2-yl]-3-methoxyprop-2-enoate

Identifiers
CAS Number	35467-43-7
3D model (JSmol)	Interactive image
ChemSpider	2300974
PubChem CID	3037151
UNII	43X9C2G2W5
CompTox Dashboard (EPA)	DTXSID201046112
- InChI: InChI=1S/C22H26N2O3/c1-4-14-12-24-10-9-16-15-7-5-6-8-19(15)23-21(16)20(24)11-17(14)18(13-26-2)22(25)27-3/h4-8,13-14,17,20,23H,1,9-12H2,2-3H3/b18-13+/t14-,17-,20+/m0/s1 Key: TZUGIFAYWNNSAO-AZQGJTAVSA-N
- SMILES: CO/C=C(\[C@H]1C[C@@H]2C3=C(CCN2C[C@@H]1C=C)C4=CC=CC=C4N3)/C(=O)OC

Properties
Chemical formula	C_{22}H_{26}N_{2}O_{3}
Molar mass	366.461 g·mol^{−1}
- Except where otherwise noted, data are given for materials in their standard state (at 25 °C [77 °F], 100 kPa). Infobox references

Hirsuteine is an alkaloid isolated from Uncaria and found in Yokukansan. Hirsuteine is an in vitro antagonist of nicotinic receptors.
