= Mitraphylline =

- Mitraphylline

Names
- IUPAC name Methyl 19α-methyl-2-oxoformosanan-16-carboxylate
- Systematic IUPAC name Methyl (1′S,3R,4′aS,5′aS,10′aR)-1′-methyl-2-oxo-1,2,4′a,5′,5′a,7′,8′,10′a-octahydro-1′H,10′H-spiro[indole-3,6′-pyrano[3,4-f]indolizine]-4′-carboxylate

Identifiers
CAS Number	509-80-8
3D model (JSmol)	Interactive image
ChEMBL	ChEMBL2135897
ChemSpider	84977
ECHA InfoCard	100.007.370
EC Number	208-106-0
KEGG	C09227
PubChem CID	94160
UNII	1H9SRL2456
CompTox Dashboard (EPA)	DTXSID50198926
- InChI: InChI=1S/C21H24N2O4/c1-12-14-10-23-8-7-21(16-5-3-4-6-17(16)22-20(21)25)18(23)9-13(14)15(11-27-12)19(24)26-2/h3-6,11-14,18H,7-10H2,1-2H3,(H,22,25)/t12-,13-,14+,18-,21+/m0/s1 Key: JMIAZDVHNCCPDM-DAFCLMLCSA-N
- SMILES: C[C@H]1[C@H]2CN3CC[C@]4([C@@H]3C[C@@H]2C(=CO1)C(=O)OC)C5=CC=CC=C5NC4=O

Properties
Chemical formula	C_{21}H_{24}N_{2}O_{4}
Molar mass	368.1736 g/mol
- Except where otherwise noted, data are given for materials in their standard state (at 25 °C [77 °F], 100 kPa). verify (what is ?) Infobox references

Mitraphylline, an oxindole derivative, is an active alkaloid in the leaves of the tree Mitragyna speciosa, commonly known as kratom. As a non-narcotic constituent, it also occurs in the bark of Uncaria tomentosa (cat's claw) along with isomeric alkaloids.
