= Rhynchophylline =

Names
- IUPAC name Methyl (7R,16E)-17-methoxy-2-oxo-16,17-didehydro-20α-corynoxan-16-carboxylate
- Systematic IUPAC name Methyl (2E)-2-[(1′R,6′R,7′S,8a′S)-6′-ethyl-2-oxo-1,2,2′,3′,6′,7′,8′,8a′-octahydro-5′H-spiro[indole-3,1′-indolizin]-7′-yl]-3-methoxyprop-2-enoate
- Other names: Rhyncophylline; Mitrinermin; Mitrinermine; Rhynchophyllin; Rhynocophylline

Identifiers
CAS Number	76-66-4
3D model (JSmol)	Interactive image
ChEBI	CHEBI:70069
ChEMBL	ChEMBL519266
ChemSpider	4444758
ECHA InfoCard	100.208.612
KEGG	C09236
PubChem CID	3033948
UNII	46BQ79VJ8D
CompTox Dashboard (EPA)	DTXSID70878612
- InChI: InChI=1S/C22H28N2O4/c1-4-14-12-24-10-9-22(17-7-5-6-8-18(17)23-21(22)26)19(24)11-15(14)16(13-27-2)20(25)28-3/h5-8,13-15,19H,4,9-12H2,1-3H3,(H,23,26)/b16-13+/t14-,15-,19-,22+/m0/s1 Key: DAXYUDFNWXHGBE-KAXDATADSA-N; InChI=1/C22H28N2O4/c1-4-14-12-24-10-9-22(17-7-5-6-8-18(17)23-21(22)26)19(24)11-15(14)16(13-27-2)20(25)28-3/h5-8,13-15,19H,4,9-12H2,1-3H3,(H,23,26)/b16-13+/t14-,15-,19-,22+/m0/s1 Key: DAXYUDFNWXHGBE-KAXDATADBC
- SMILES: CC[C@H]1CN2CC[C@]3([C@@H]2C[C@@H]1/C(=C\OC)/C(=O)OC)C4=CC=CC=C4NC3=O

Properties
Chemical formula	C_{22}H_{28}N_{2}O_{4}
Molar mass	384.476 g·mol^{−1}
- Except where otherwise noted, data are given for materials in their standard state (at 25 °C [77 °F], 100 kPa). verify (what is ?) Infobox references

Rhynchophylline is an alkaloid found in certain Uncaria species (Rubiaceae), notably Uncaria rhynchophylla and Uncaria tomentosa. It also occurs in the leaves of Mitragyna speciosa (kratom) and Mitragyna tubulosa, a tree native to Thailand. Chemically, it is related to the alkaloid mitragynine.

Rhynchophylline is a non-competitive NMDA antagonist (IC_{50} = 43.2 μM) and a calcium channel blocker.

Uncaria species have had a variety of uses in traditional herbal medicine, such as for lightheadedness, convulsions, numbness, and hypertension. These uses have been associated with the presence of rhynchophylline and have encouraged its investigation as a drug candidate for several cardiovascular and central nervous system diseases; however, few clinically relevant studies have been conducted.

== See also ==
- Ibotenic acid
- Mitragynine pseudoindoxyl
- Proboscidea parviflora
