= Hualapai Mountains =

Landform in Arizona, US

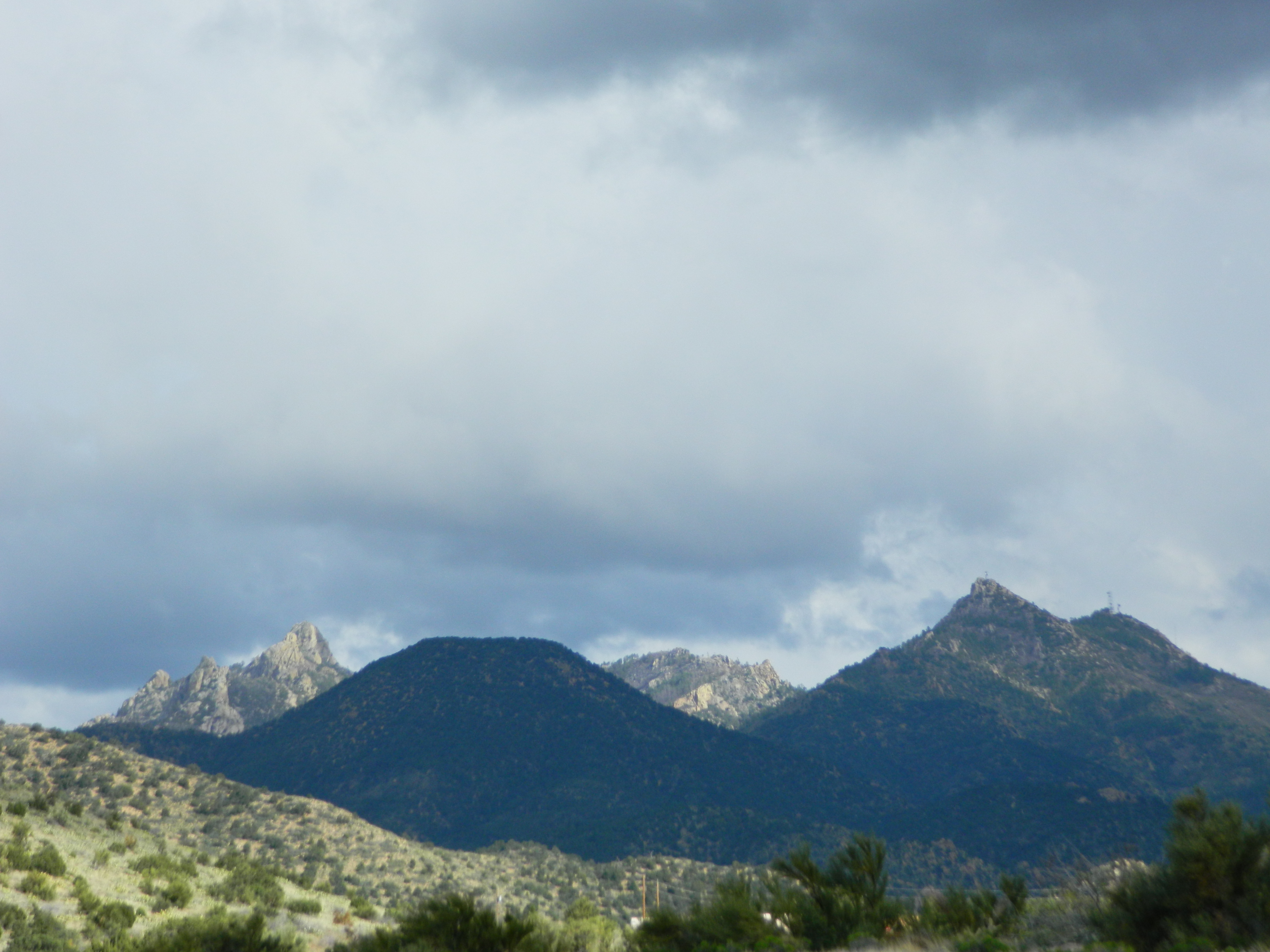
- The Hualapai Mountains are home to the highest peaks in Mohave County, Arizona.

Highest point
- Peak: Hualapai Peak
- Elevation: 8,417 ft (2,566 m)

Naming
- Native name: 'Amat 'Avii Kahuwaaly (Mohave)

Geography
- Location within Arizona
- Country: United States
- State: Arizona
- County: Mohave County
- Range coordinates: 34°54′00″N 113°53′03″W
- Topo map(s): USGS Hualapai Peak, Dean Peak

The Hualapai Mountains are a mountain range located in Mohave County, east of Kingman, Arizona. Rising up to 8,417 feet at its highest peak, the higher elevations of the Hualapai Mountains support Madrean Sky Island habitats, and are host to a plethora of unique flora and fauna in a wide range of microclimates, high above the surrounding Mojave Desert.

== Etymology ==
Pronounced: "wah-lah-pie"

Meaning of "Hualapai" in Hualapai language: "People of the tall Pines".

English spelling: Walapai

Spanish spelling: Hualapai

Most used spelling: Hualapai, though both are acceptable

Other names for Hualapai Mountain:

Mojave language: Amat 'Avii Kahuwaaly

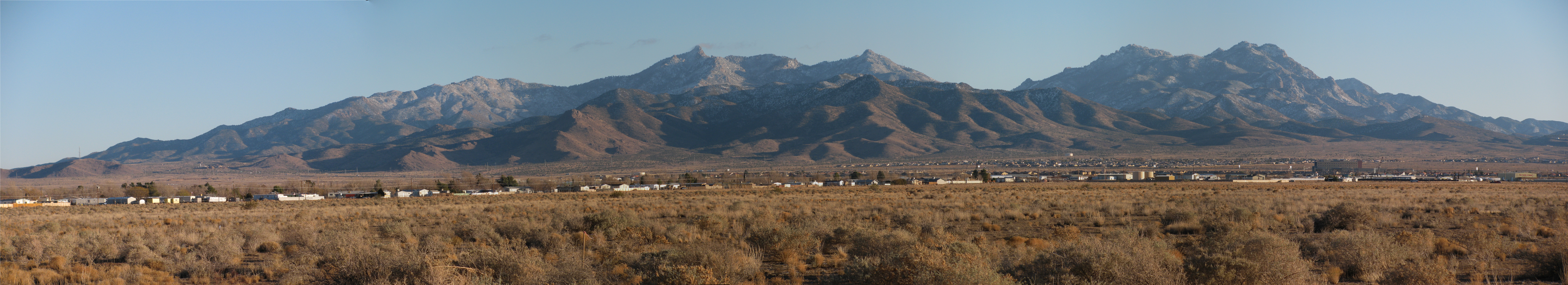
Panorama of the Hualapai Mountains taken from Kingman in December 2009

== Geography ==
The Hualapai Mountain range is located in the central portion of the Basin and Range Province of the southwestern United States, and along the western-most extension of the Arizona Transition Zone (or "Central Highlands" of Arizona).

=== Summits ===
The most notable peaks in the Hualapai Mountain Range include:

==== Hualapai Peak ====
(8,417 feet / 2,566 meters) is the highest peak in the range, as well as the highest point in Mohave County.

==== Hayden Peak ====
(8,390 feet / 2,560 meters) is the second highest peak in the range, and is the site of a communications tower, which is gated and is not accessible to the public.

==== Aspen Peak ====
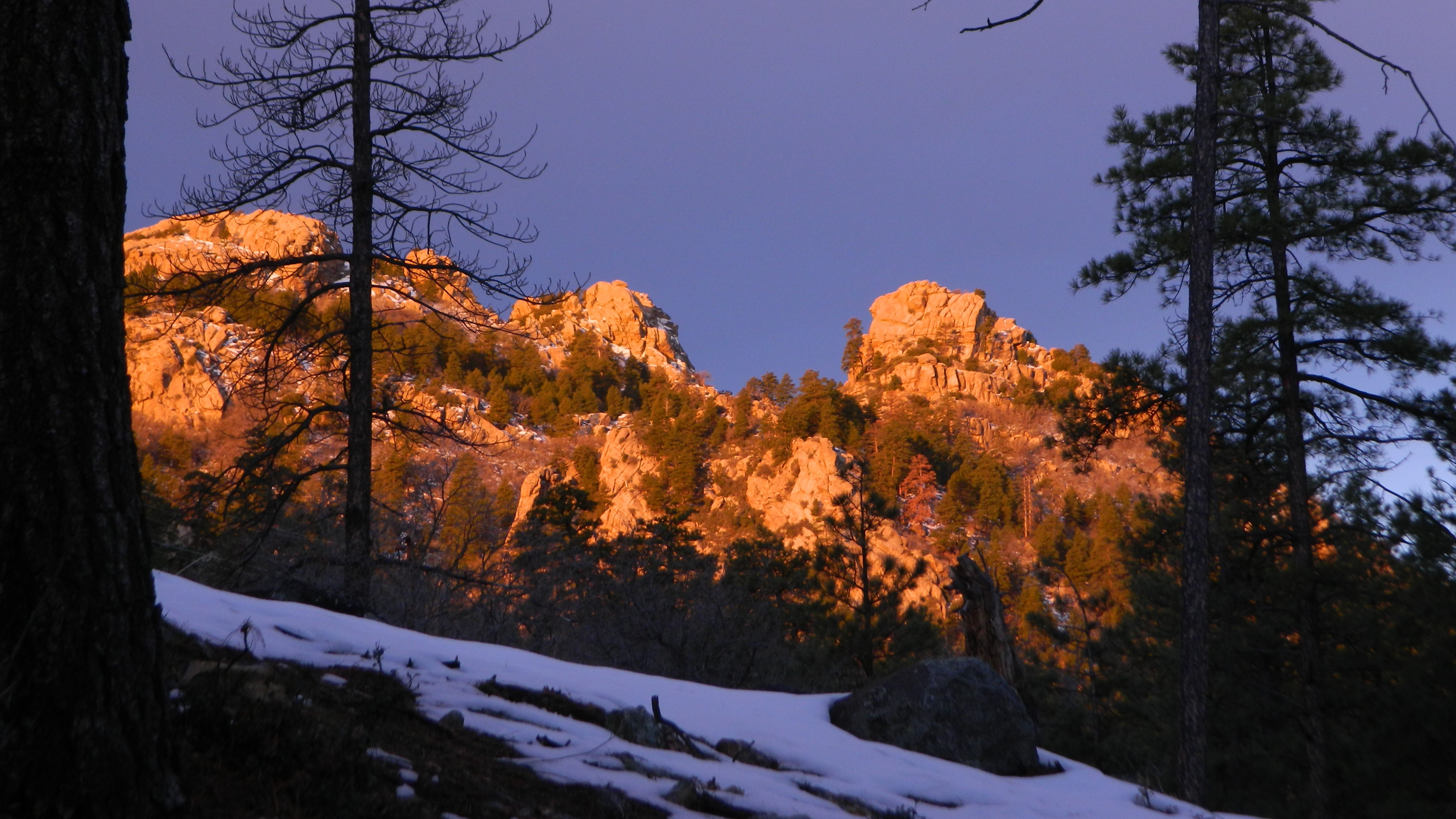
Aspen Peak, as seen from Pine Lake

(8,167 feet / 2,489 meters) is among the most visited of the 8,000-foot peaks in the range, and is located within the Hualapai Mountain County Park. Small stands of quaking aspen grow near its summit, giving the upper portion of the mountain an autumn display amidst a sea of tall evergreens.

==== Dean Peak ====
(8,013 feet / 2,442 meters) is the northern-most of the notable peaks in this range, and is named after the Dean Mine and its discoverer William Dean. who discovered rich gold and silver-sulfide ore there.

==== Wabayuma Peak ====
(7,601 feet / 2,317 meters) is located in the southern portion of the range, and is in the boundary of the Wabayuma Peak Wilderness Area, consisting of 40,000 acres managed by the Bureau of Land Management Kingman Field Office.

==== Other notable peaks ====
Getz Peak is located directly to the north of the Hualapai County Park Ranger Station, and is the site of multiple communications towers, which are also gated, and not accessible to the public.

=== Watershed tributaries ===
The Hualapai Mountain range extends into both the Upper and Lower Colorado River Basin watersheds.

- North-western flanks of the range flow into the Hualapai Valley (Hualapai Wash), north to Lake Mead.
- Southwest flanks flow into Sacramento Valley (Sacramento Wash), flowing south to the Colorado River crossing at Topock, AZ.
- Eastern flanks of the mountain flow into the Big Sandy River valley which makes a long journey south to Alamo Lake before travelling west along the Bill Williams River and into the southern portion of Lake Havasu near Parker Dam.

== Ecology ==
=== Flora ===
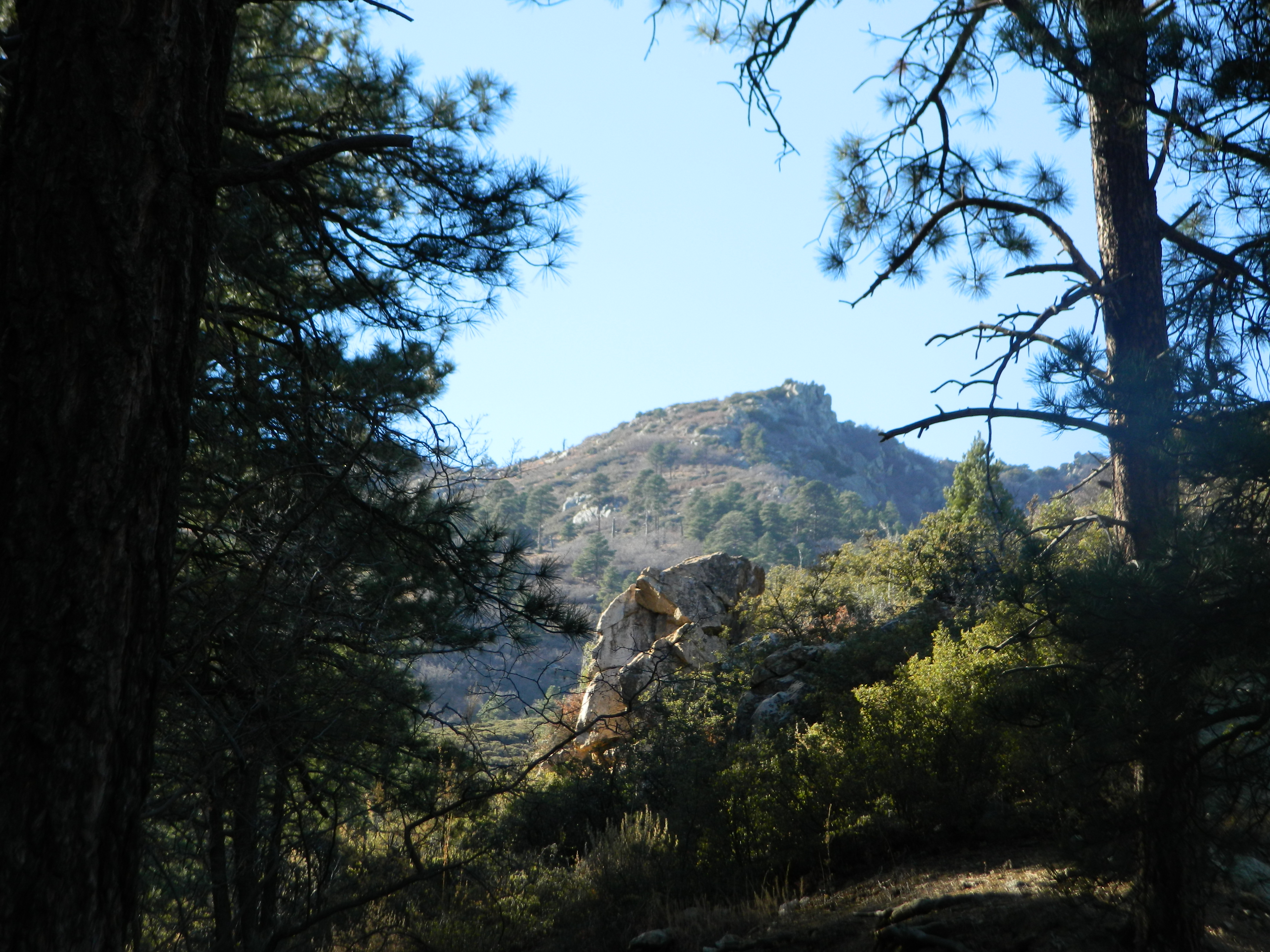
Diverse plant communities in Hualapai Mountains

The Hualapai Mountains contain a dramatic range of plant communities depending on the elevation, slope direction, and microclimate conditions of a given area.

- These lists are not a complete archive of plant species in these plant communities, but demonstrate the dominant plant varieties which are characteristic to the landscape. Plants List Source:

==== Desert/xeric shrublands ====
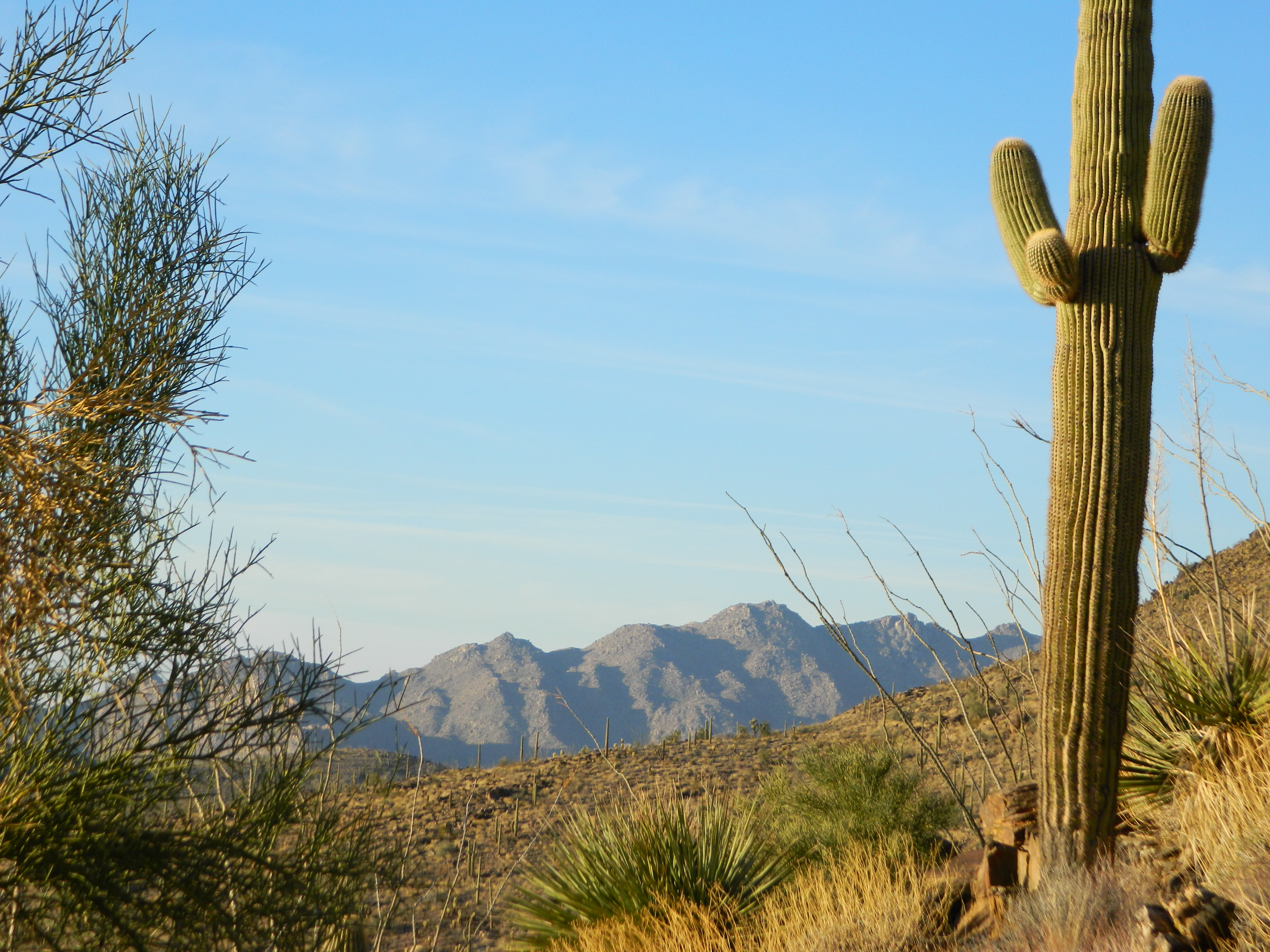
Xeric plant communities in Hualapai Mountains

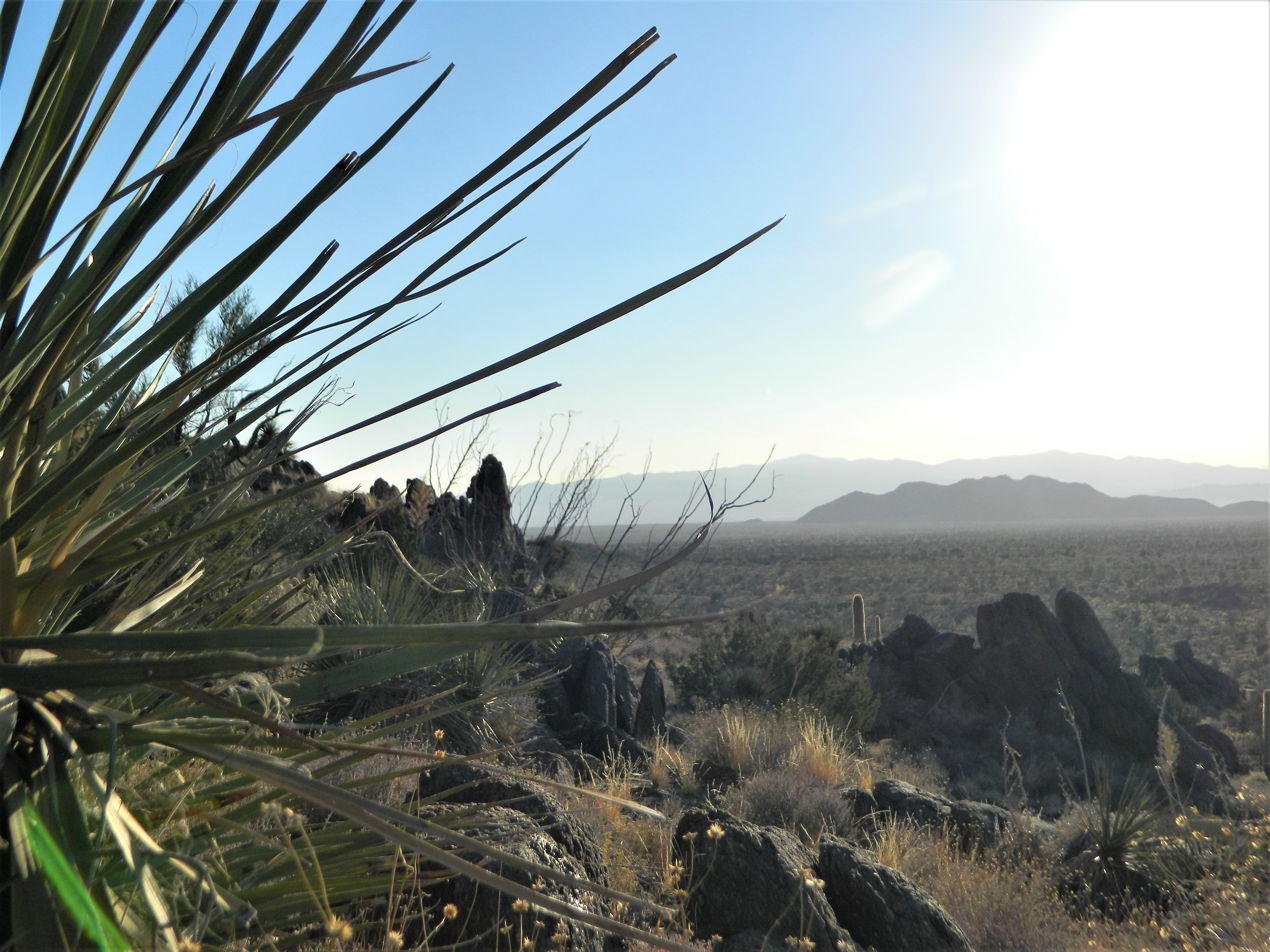
Desert plant communities in the Hualapai Mountain foothills

−282 feet (−86 m) 3,500 feet (1,100 m)

Dominating the landscape surrounding the Hualapai Mountain Sky Island, and at the lowest portion of its foothills, is the Mojave Desert which ranges from altitudes as high as 3,500 feet (1,100 m), and as low as 282 feet (86 m) below sea level, at Badwater Basin in Death Valley National Park, California. (approximately 175 miles (282 km) away as the crow flies). This list includes plant species which are native and predominant throughout the environment in and around the Hualapai Mountain foothills:

- creosote bush
- palo verde
- mesquite
- beaver-tail cactus
- saguaro cactus
- barrel cactus
- cholla (jumping) cactus
- various species of yucca
- agave
- whitehorn
- bur-sage
- cat's claw
- crucifixion thorn
- a variety of perennial grasses

==== Grasslands ====
4,000–5,000 feet (1,200–1,500 m)

The most prominent grassland communities in the area are found on the east side of the range, across Big Sandy River Valley up to the foot of the Hualapai Mountains. Dominant species of perennial grass may include:

- "blue", "black", "hairy", and "side-oats" grama
- tobosa
- ring muhly
- three-awn

==== Interior chaparral scrubland ====
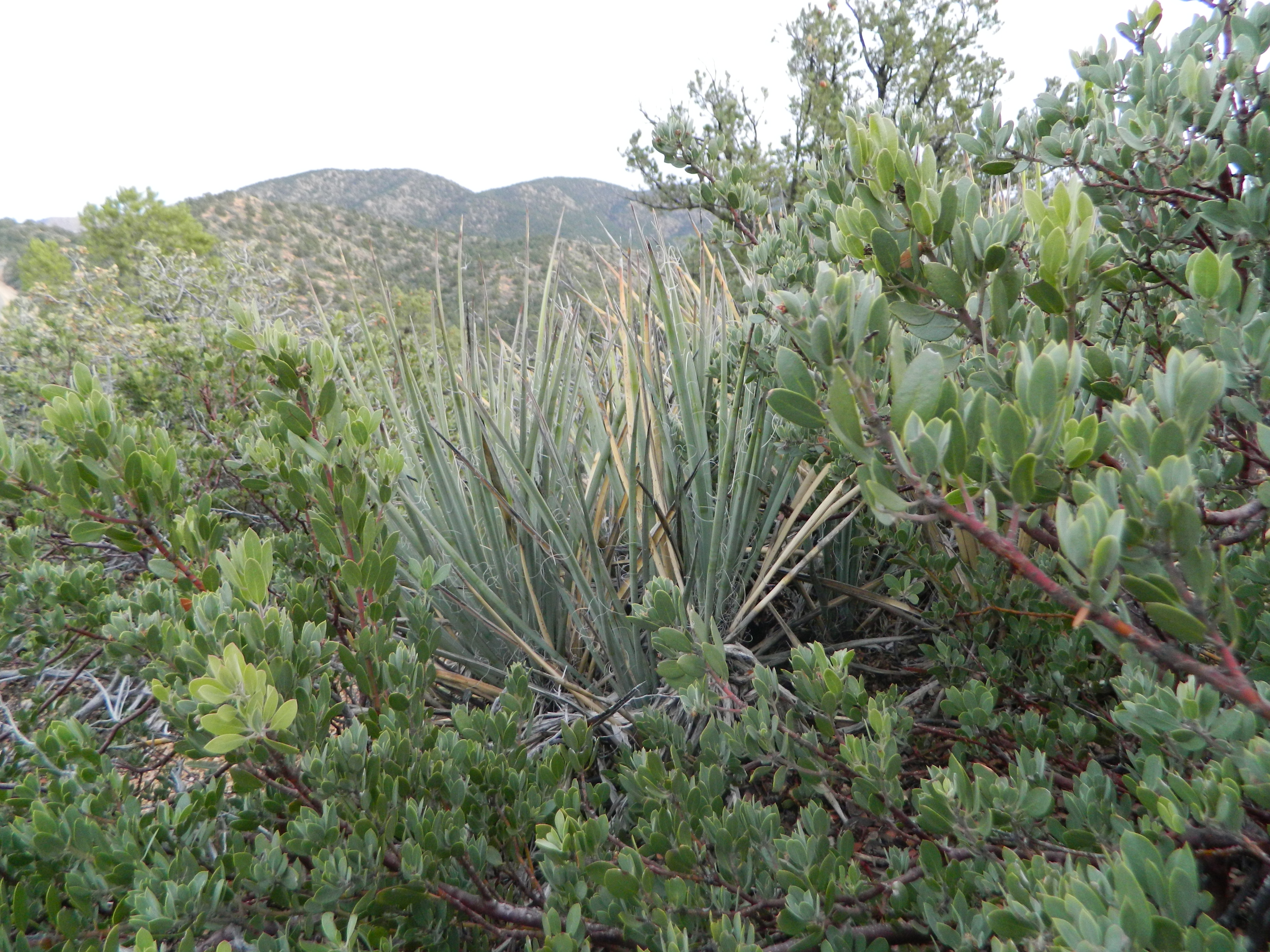
Mixed scrub, yucca, and cacti in Hualapai Mountain Foothills

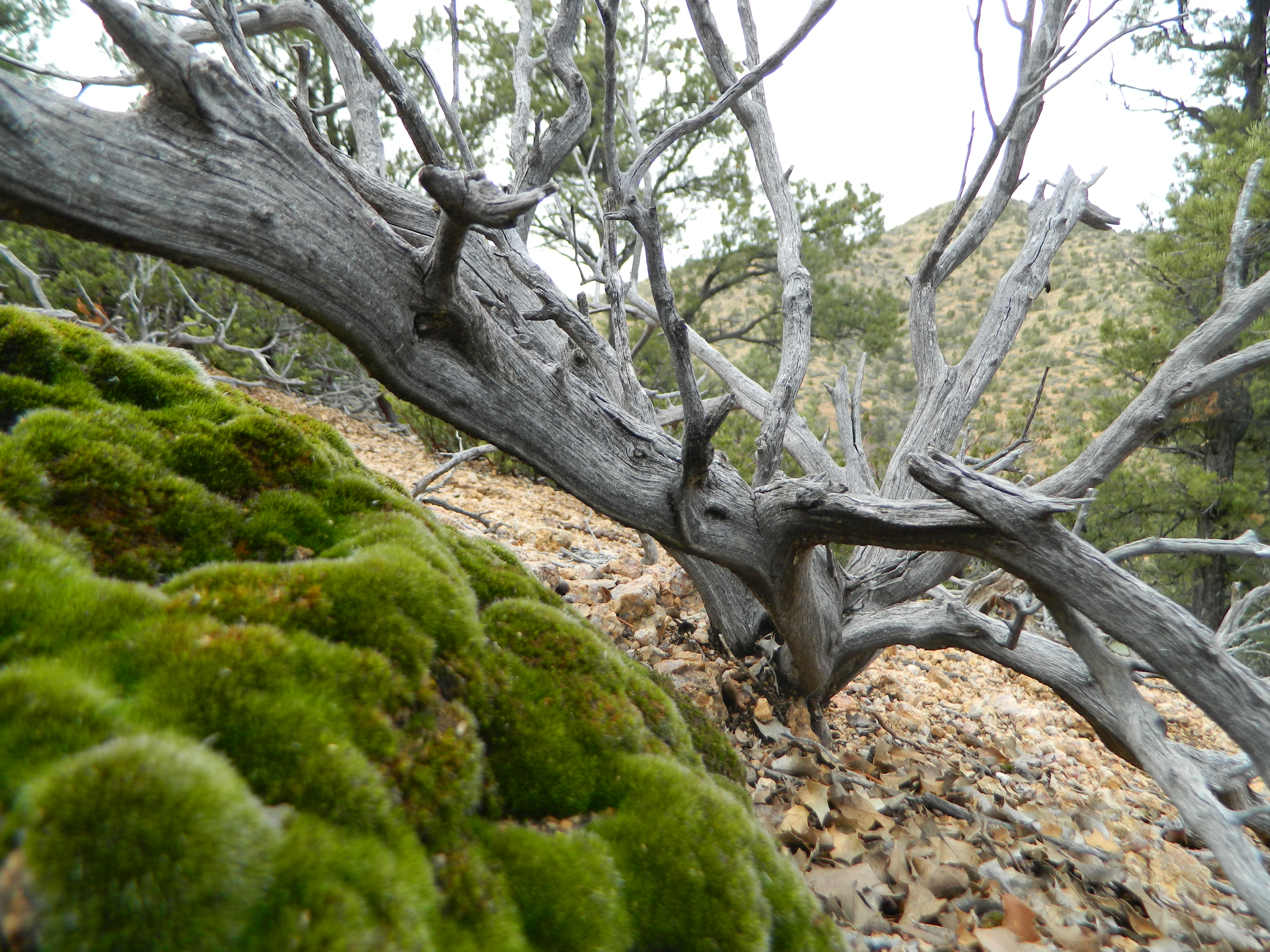
Delicate ecosystems emerge from dying scrub

3,000–5,000 feet (910–1,520 m)

A landscape that is dominated by short, woody shrubs, especially on south-facing mountain slopes, and areas which are recovering from wildfires. This plant community makes up the buffer between the harsh desert below and the fragile forest-environments above.

May include the following plant varieties/species:

- scrub oak
- manzanita
- silk tassle
- Apache plume
- cat's claw
- sparse, intermixed juniper
- cliffrose
- Grass and other ground-cover plants may be found in some varying quantities, but are generally less prominent in this plant community.

==== Piñon-Juniper woodlands ====
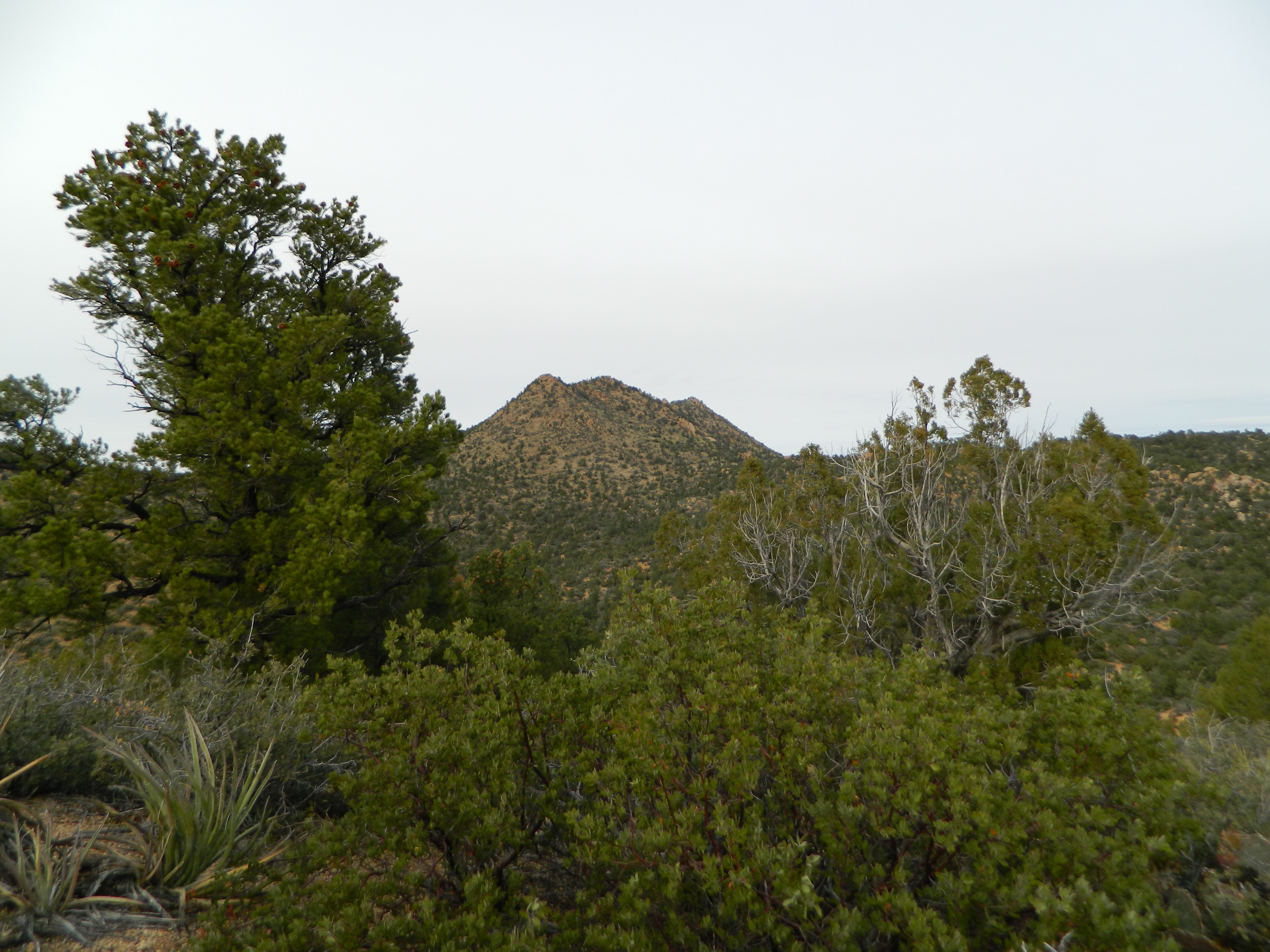
(left) Pinyon Pine, (right) Juniper, (bottom left) Yucca, (bottom middle) Manzanita

4,500–7,500 feet (1,400–2,300 m)

Pinyon-juniper woodlands are nurse plants of ecological facilitation between chaparral scrubland and forested environments at higher elevations. Juniper tends to be more predominant at lower elevations, while Piñon Pine grow more vigorously at slightly higher elevations.

Other flora varieties of this plant community may include:

- winterfat
- cliffrose
- silktassel
- goldenrod
- snakeweed
- threadleaf groundsel
- Mixed perennial grass in limited quantities. As the conifer stands develop their canopy, grass and other low-lying herbaceous plants are gradually smothered.

==== Mountain conifer forest ====
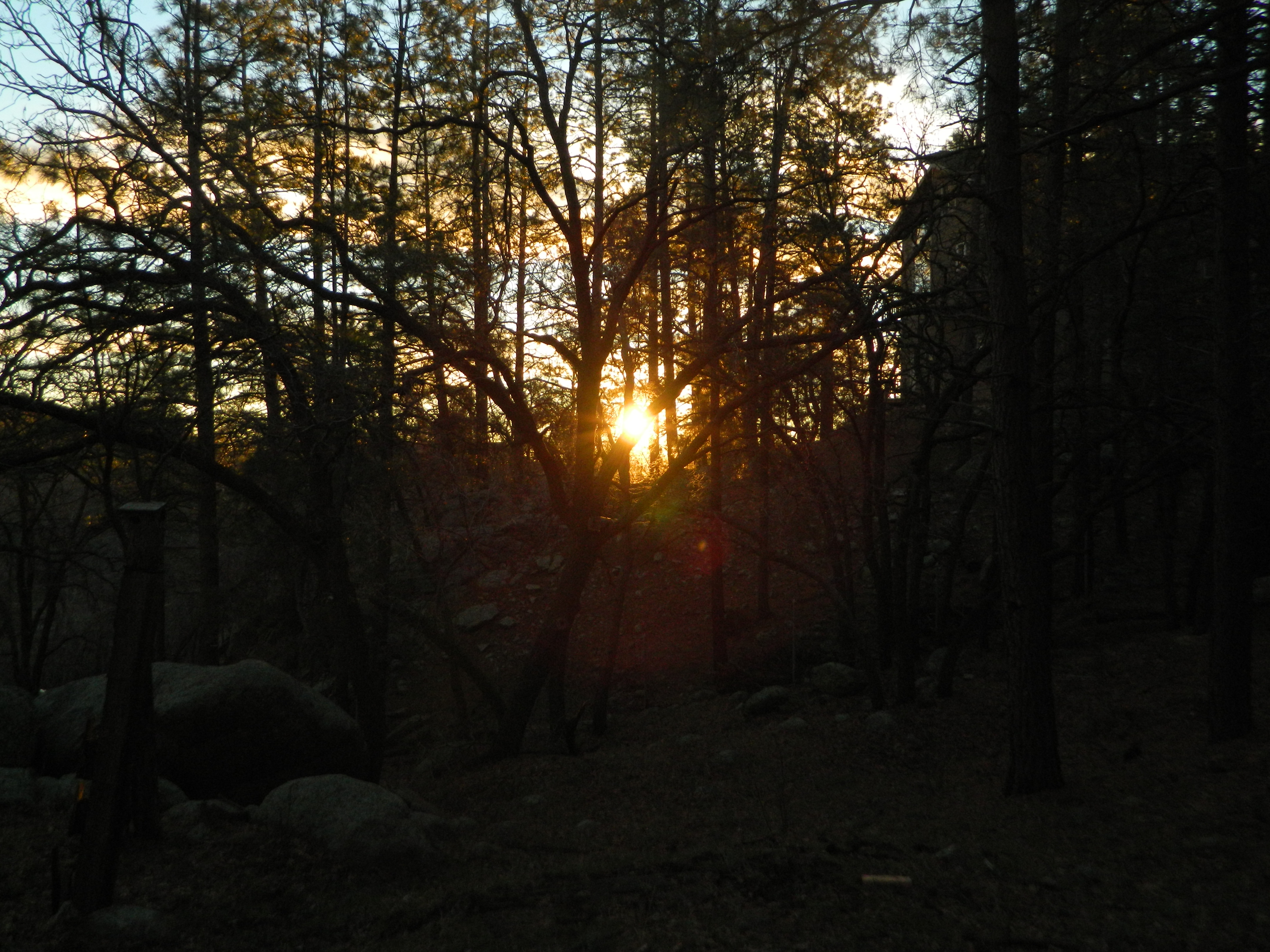
Lush micro-climates exist in the upper reaches of the Hualapai Mountains

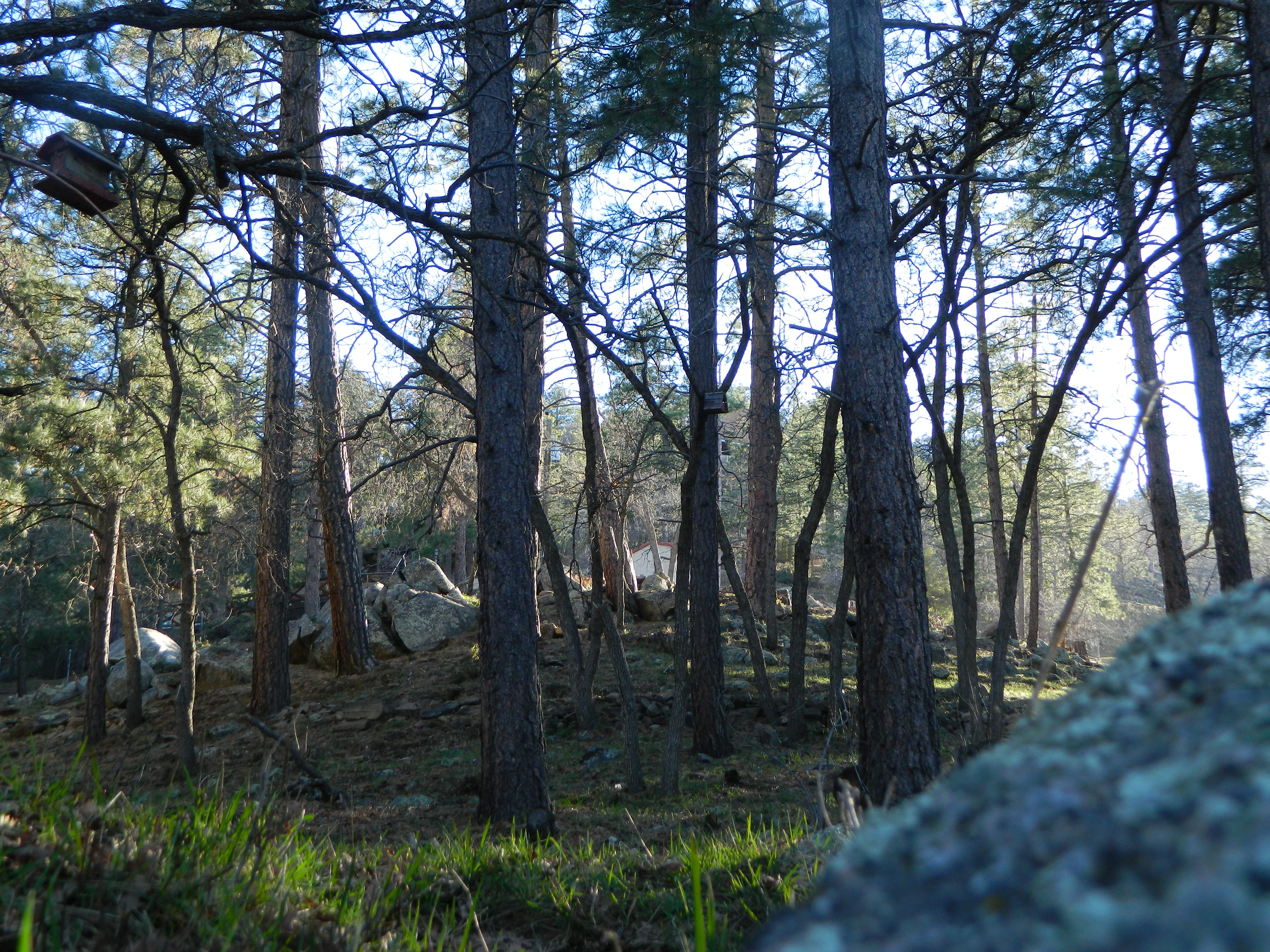
A unique world about the Mohave Desert

5000+ feet

Tall pines and thick stands of broad-leaved trees constitute the montane conifer forests in the upper elevations of the Hualapai Mountains.

Trees include:

- ponderosa pine
- gambel oak
- Arizona walnut
- (quaking) aspen
- douglas fir
- white fir

Grasses may include:

- blue grama
- western wheatgrass
- sheep fescue
- Arizona fescue
- mountain and screwleaf muhly
- junegrass
- muttongrass
- sedges

=== Wildlife ===
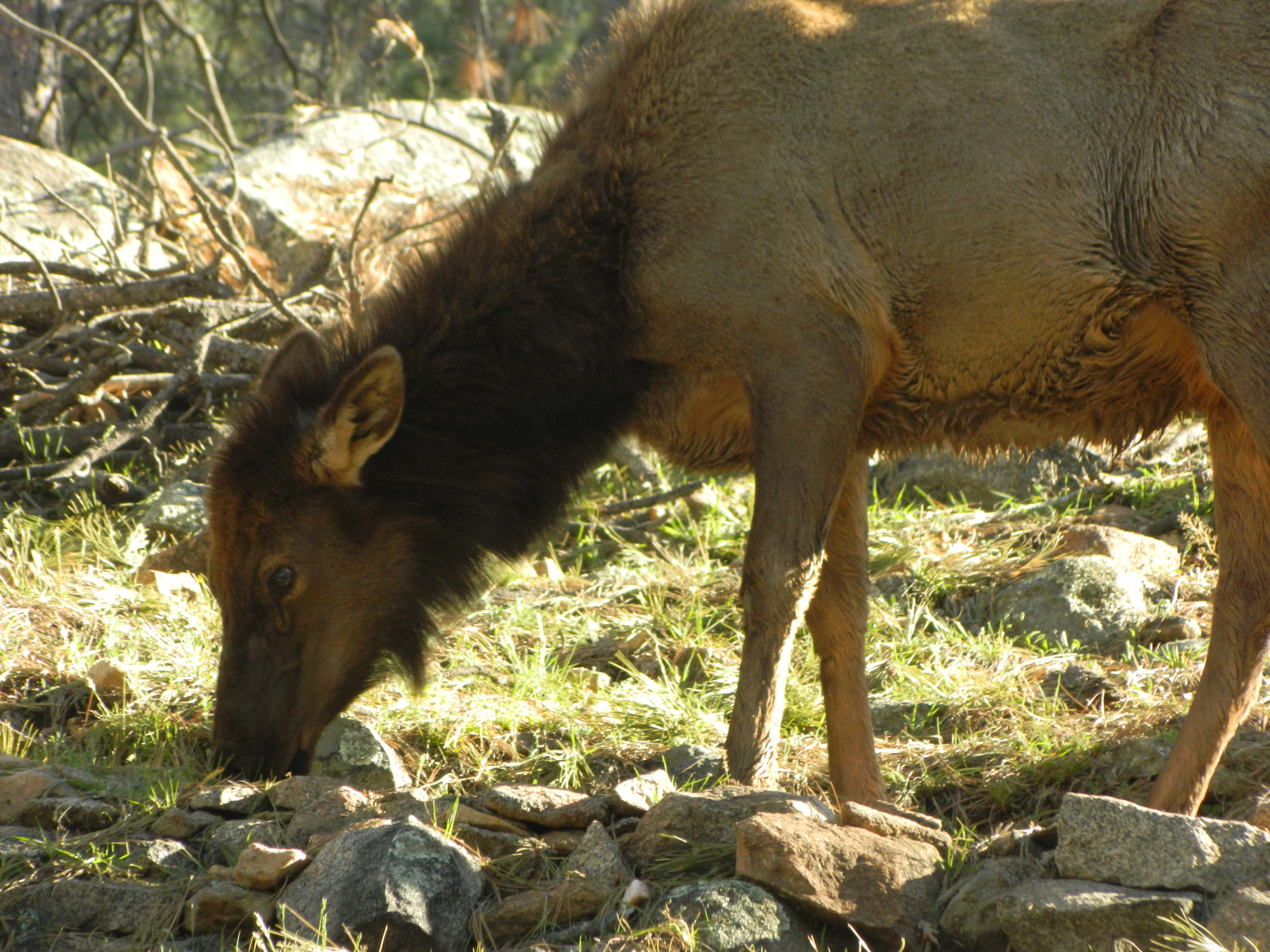
Elk (wapiti) in the Hualapai Mountains

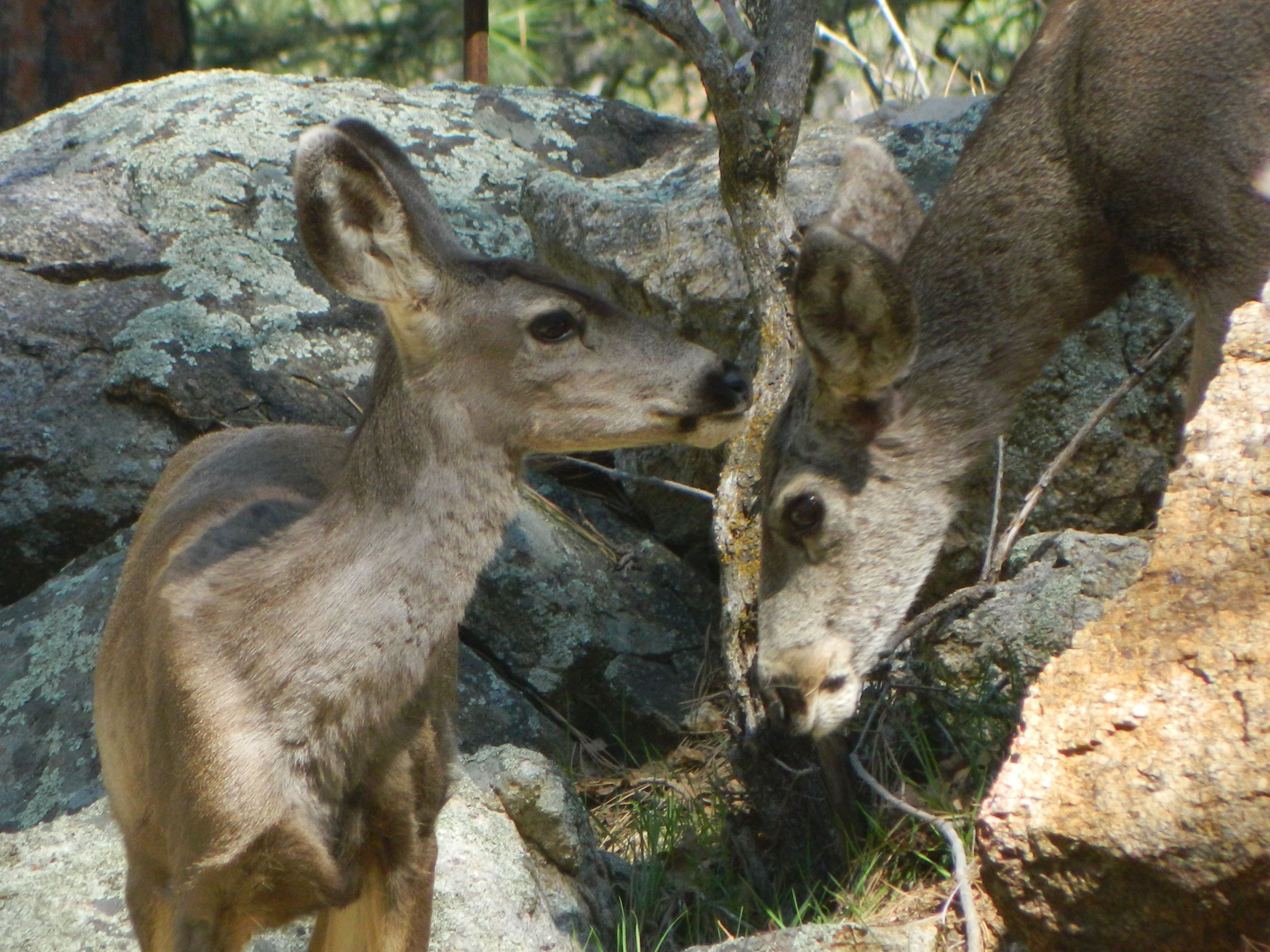
Doe and her fawn in the Hualapai Mountains

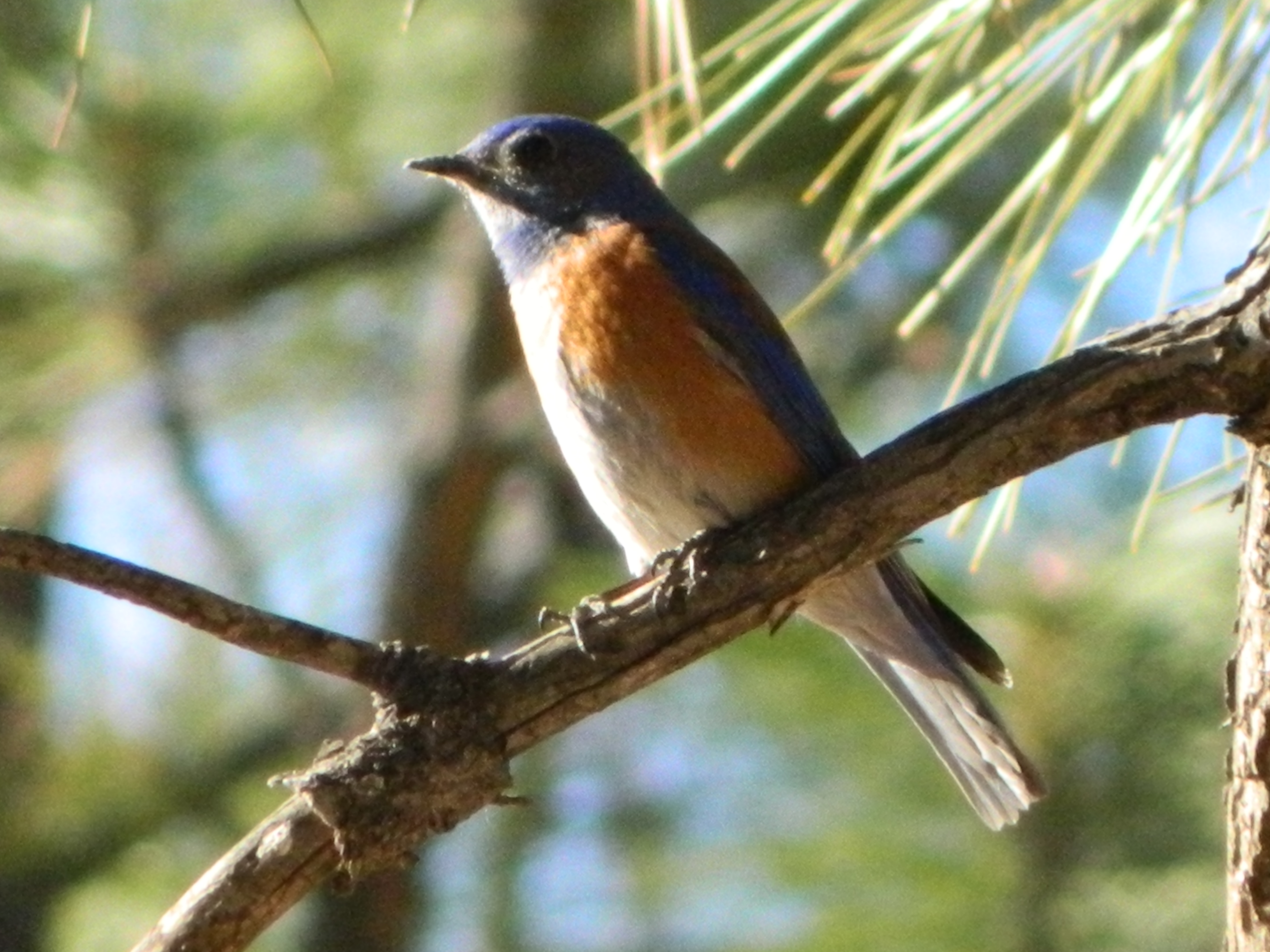
Many colorful birds (such as this Western Bluebird) can be found in the Hualapai Mountains.

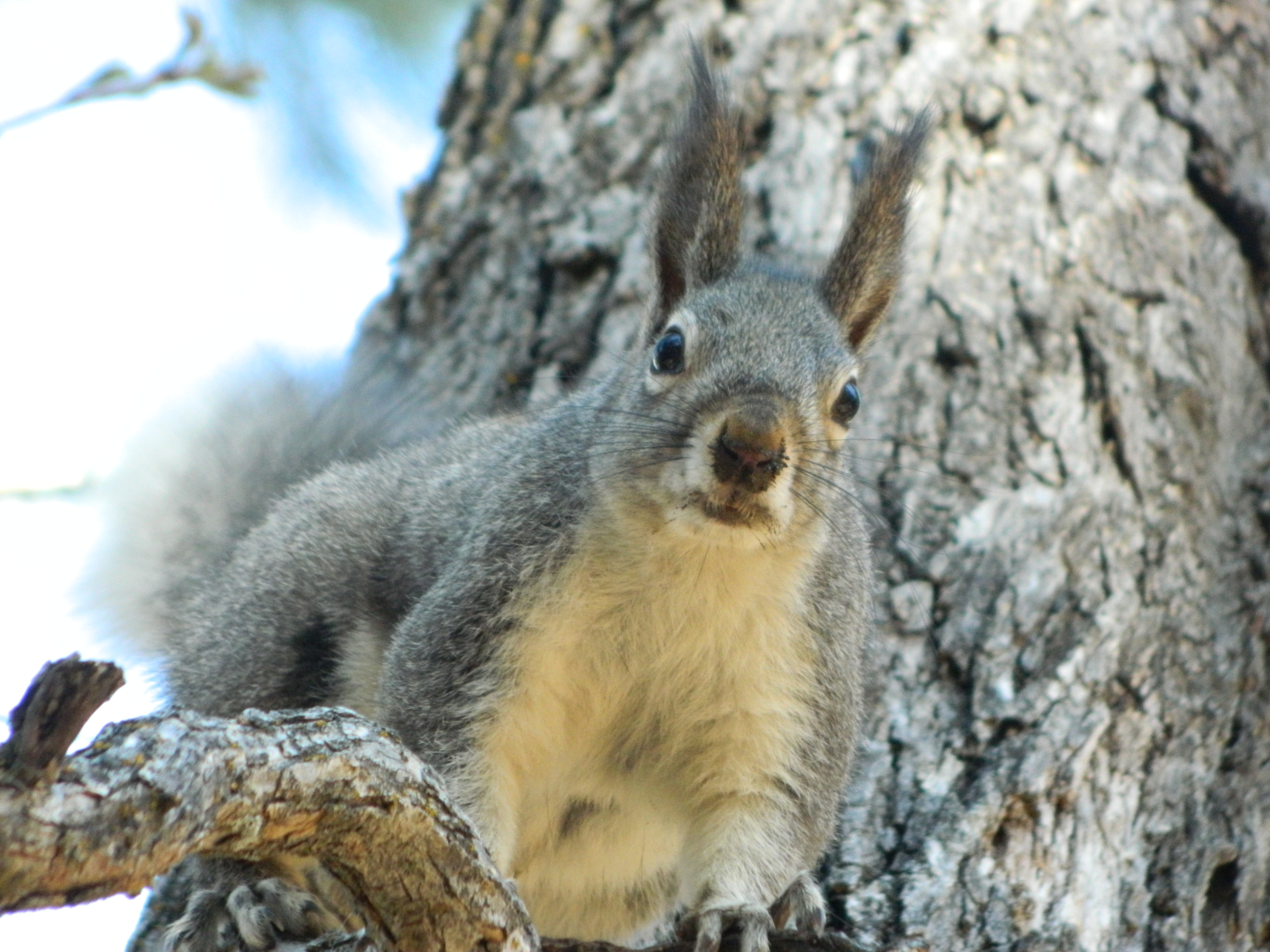
Grey Squirrel in the Hualapai Mountains

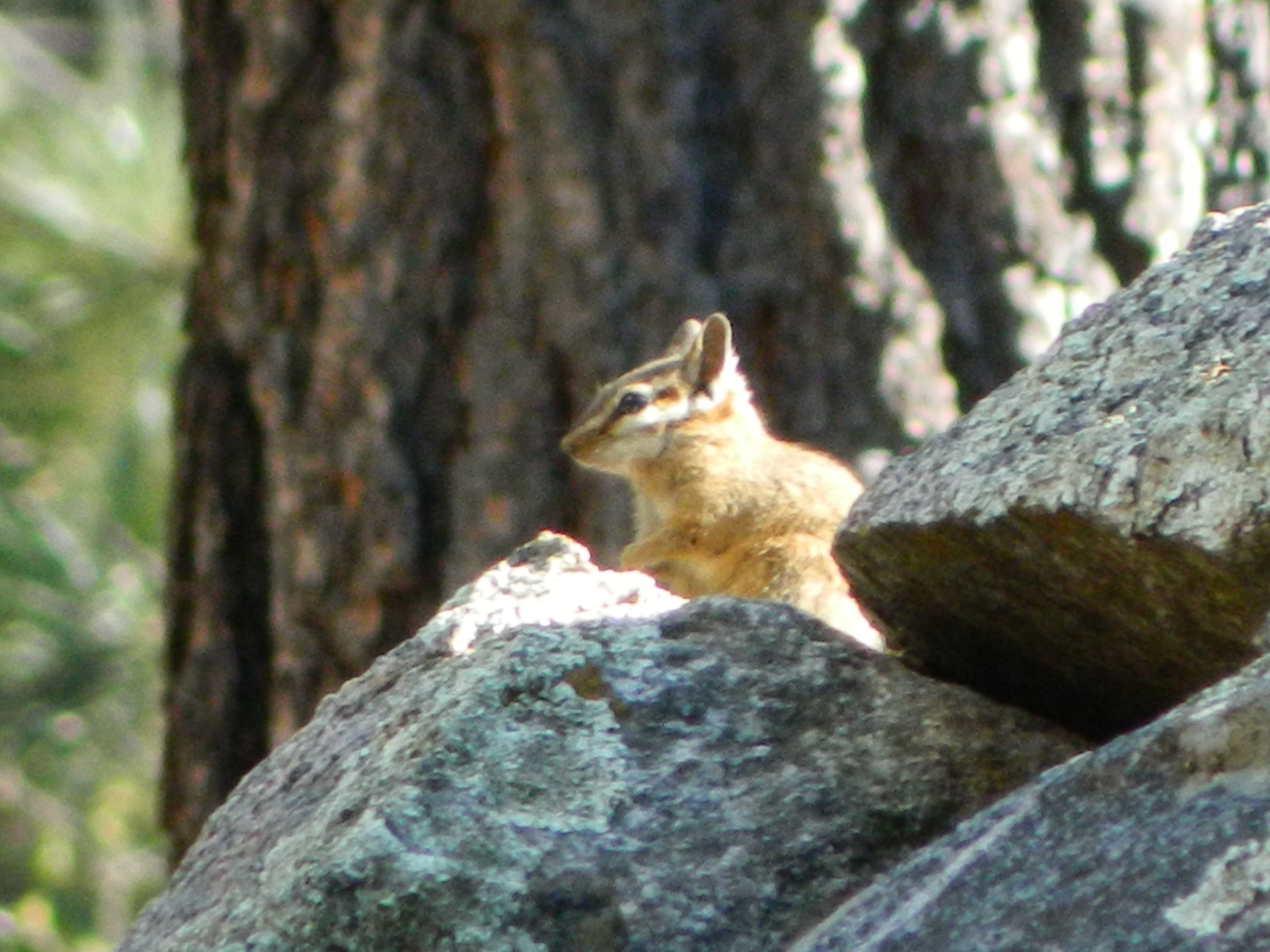
A chipmunk in the Hualapai Mountains.

Black bear, elk, mule deer, mountain lion, javelina, and other animals can be found here. Mountain lion and bear have been drawn to civilized areas like Pinion Pines and Atherton Acres due to the large deer population, though bear sightings are very uncommon. One particular noteworthy bird is the Gambel's quail There are some animals only native to the Hualapai Mountain range, including a breed of ground squirrel, and tarantula.

Birds

A variety of birds are frequently observed in the Hualapai mountains, both in the park and surrounding areas.Cornell Lab of Ornithology provides a comprehensive self service log to where birders can record date and time of an observance and contains records of over 160 distinct species.

== Geology ==
USGS completed a survey in 1972 of the Hualapai mountains and surrounding area. The report covers the type of rock material discovered such as igneous, metamorphic, sedimentary, and volcanic. The subject report was commissioned to study water flow through the Hualapai mountains out through the Kingman plains to the Hualapai Reservation in Peach Springs, Arizona and Grand Canyon West. Two main valleys Hualapai Valley and Sacramento Valley are central to Mohave County and are characterized as semiarid.

== Points of interest and activities ==
=== Hualapai Mountain County Park ===
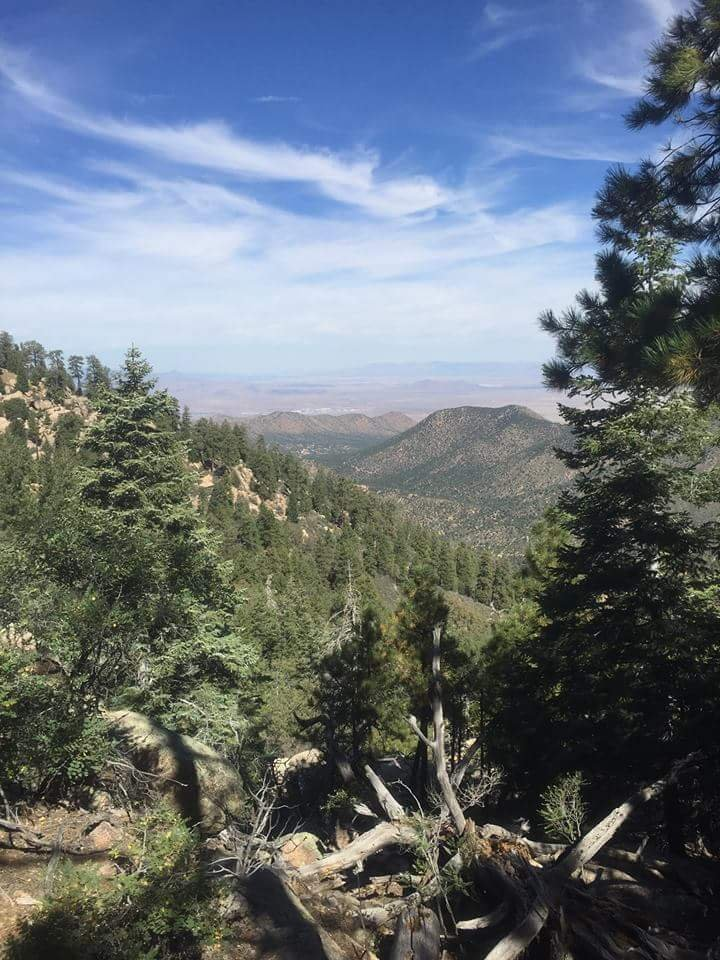
View of Kingman, Arizona, from the top of the Hualapai Mountains

The area that is now Hualapai Mountain Park was first developed in the 1930s by the Civilian Conservation Corps (CCC), and is, today, managed by the Mohave County Parks department. The park encompasses over 2,300 acres (9.3 km^{2}) with elevations ranging from 4,984 feet (1,519 m) to the highest peak within its boundary; Hayden Peak8,390 feet (2,560 m)., and is the gateway to the high point of Mohave County; Hualapai Peak at 8,417 feet (2,566 m). Hualapai Peak is located south of the Mohave County Park boundary on Bureau of Land Management land.

The park has cabins, recreation areas, dry camping campsites, and hook-up spots for recreational vehicles, and is generally open year-round for camping and recreation. There are signs telling the history, varieties of vegetation, local and migratory birds, and other wildlife which can be spotted around the park. There are over 10 miles (16 km) of hiking trails ranging in difficulty, and an OHV trailhead near the ranger station which leads to a vast network of trails on both the county park and BLM lands.

=== Pine Lake Valley ===
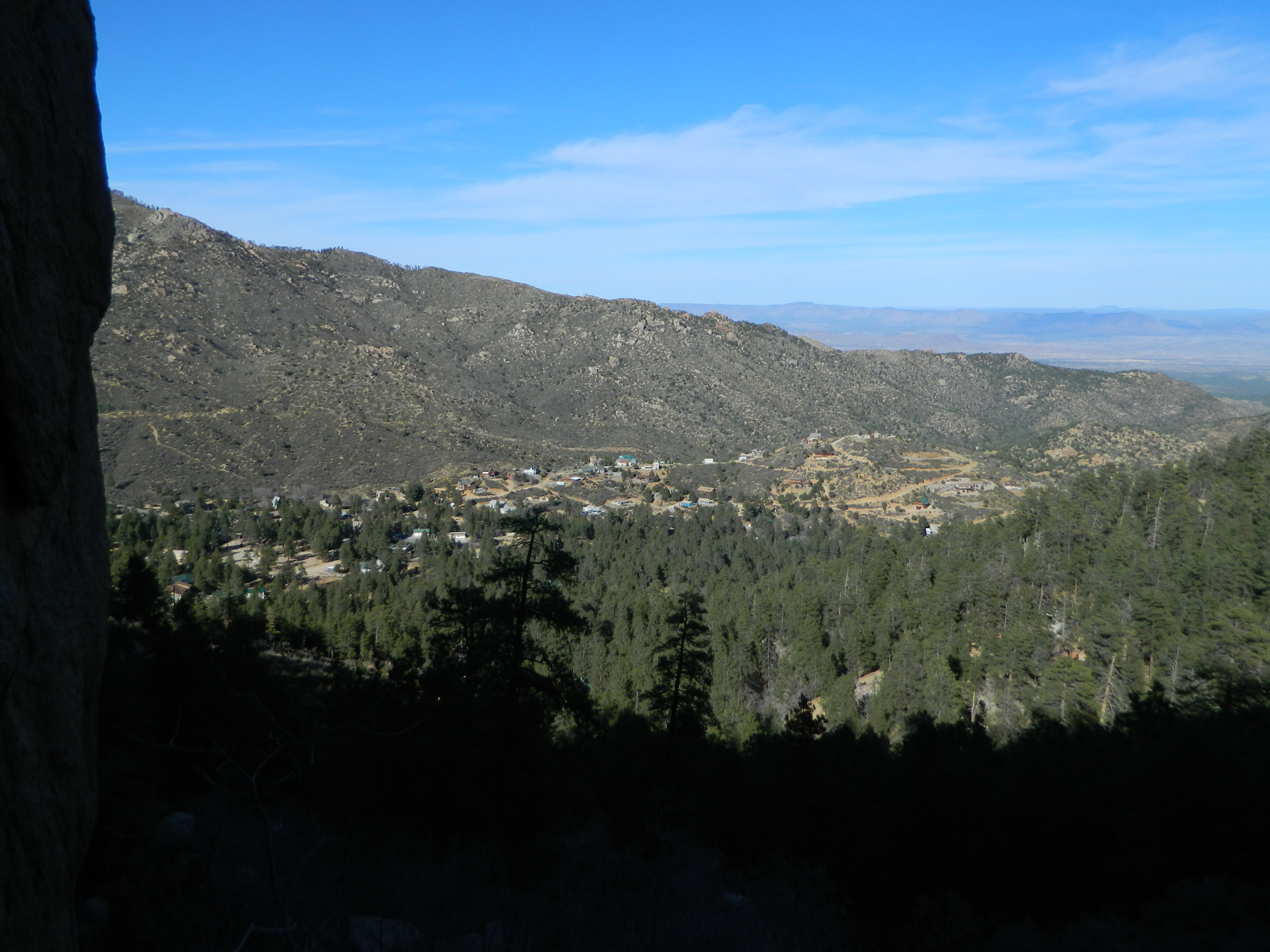
Overlook of Pine Lake Community

Near the end of Hualapai Mountain Road, just past the Hualapai Mountain Park ranger station, is a community known as Pine Lake. The lake itself, for which the valley gets its name, is privately owned, and is not available to the public, however, it is viewable from a number of high points surrounding the valley, namely along Flag Mine Road, as well as Ponderosa Drive, the public access route to the county "Fuels Management" area (community burn-pile).

The community has approximately 140 homes and is a little over 6,000 ft (1,800 m) in elevation. Some basic amenities, including the Hualapai Mountain Resort (general store, hotel, restaurant, bar, and event center), a volunteer fire department, and some privately owned cabins for rent may be found here.

=== Wildcow Campground ===
Accessed from Flag Mine Road, Wild Cow Springs Campground is located on Antelope Wash Road (fire evacuation route). The campground is managed by the Bureau of Land Management, and is a paid site with outhouses and a few bear-proof trashcans, but it is recommended to pack out your garbage if possible.

This site is technically accessible with a 5th wheel or class A motorhome, but comes with its own risks. Contact the Bureau of Land Management Kingman Field Office for road conditions if in doubt.

=== Off-road trails ===
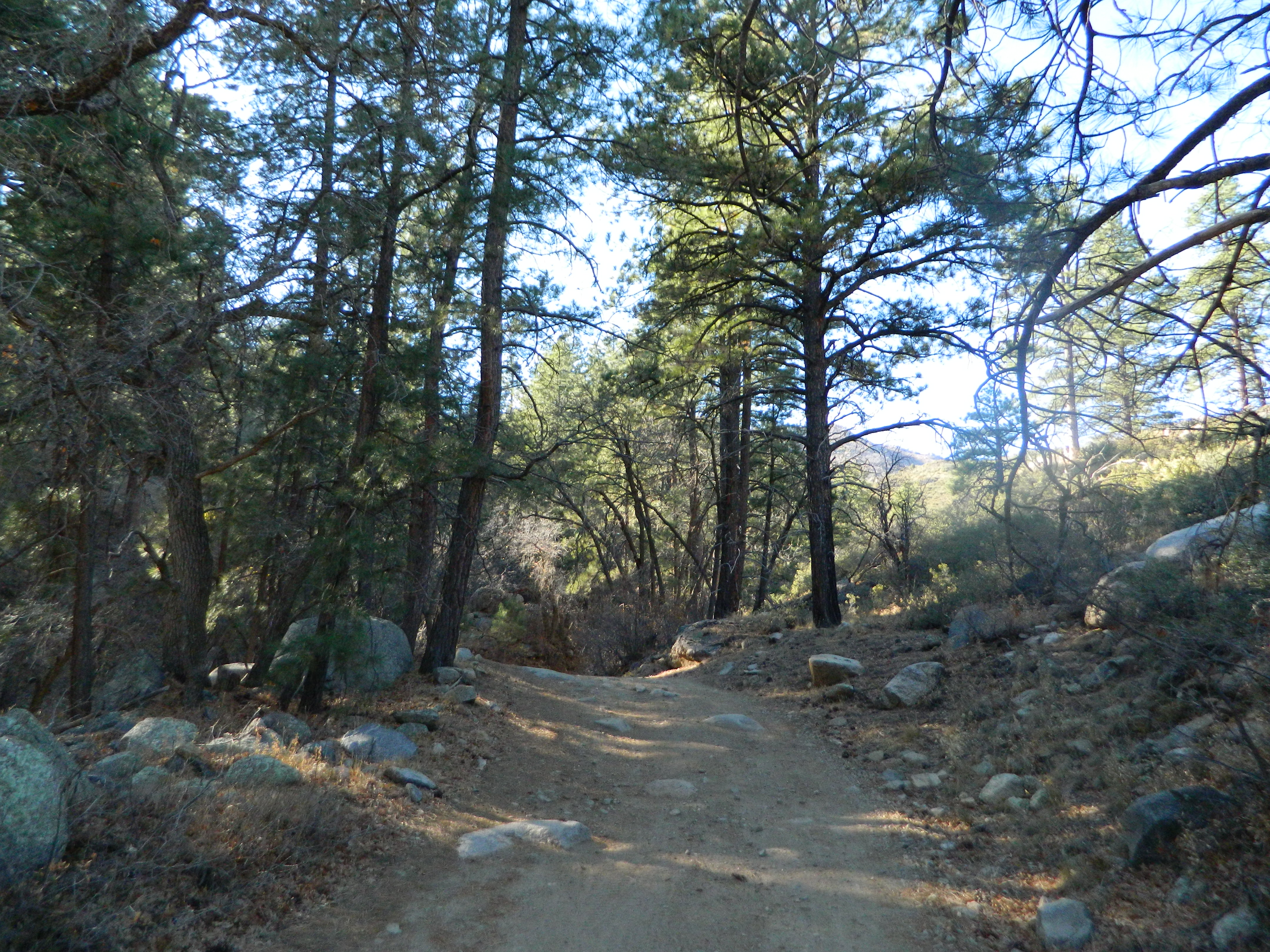
A snippet of the Arizona Peace Trail in the Hualapai Mountains

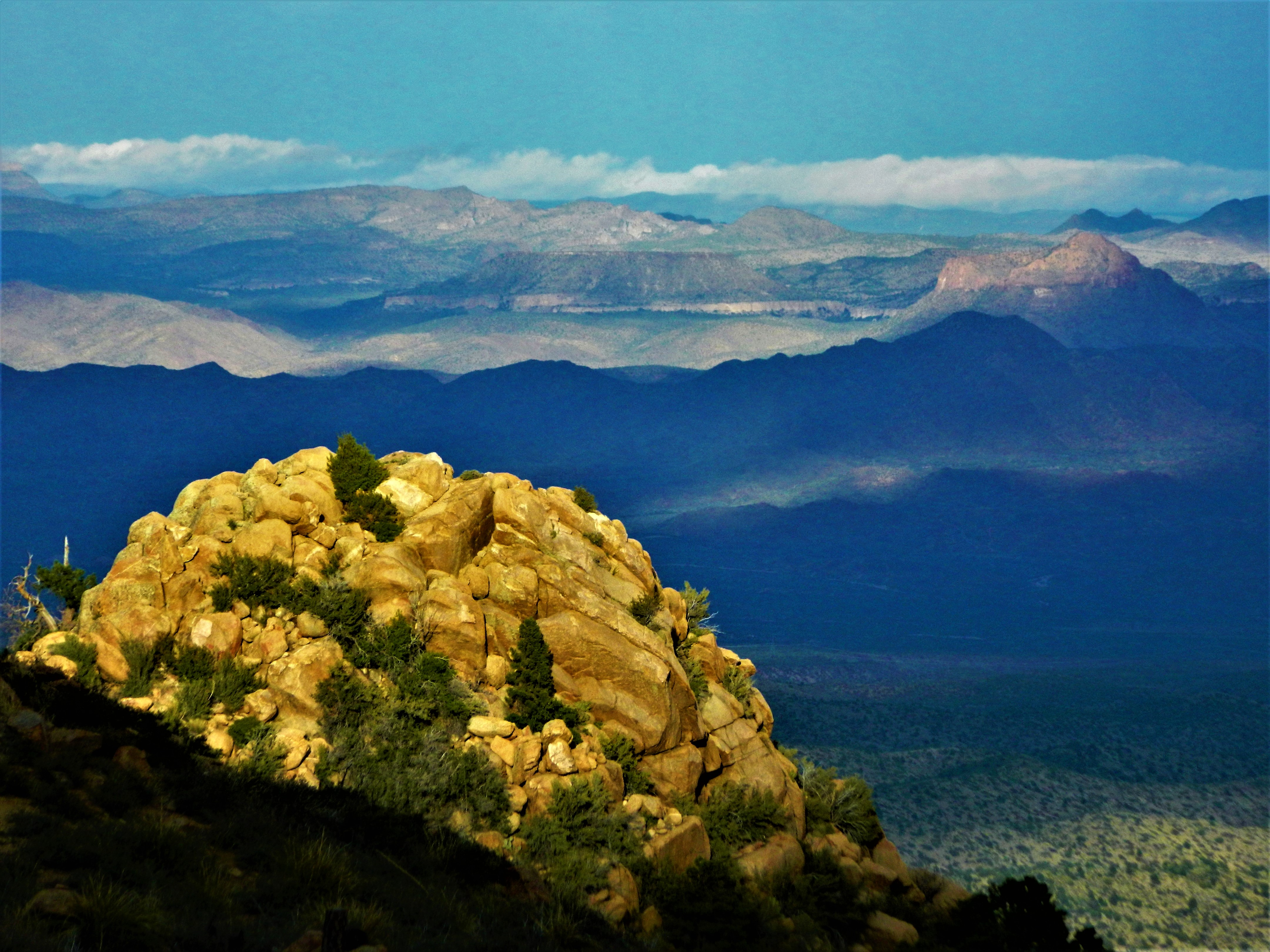
A view of the Aquarius Mountains from the top of the AZ Peace Trail

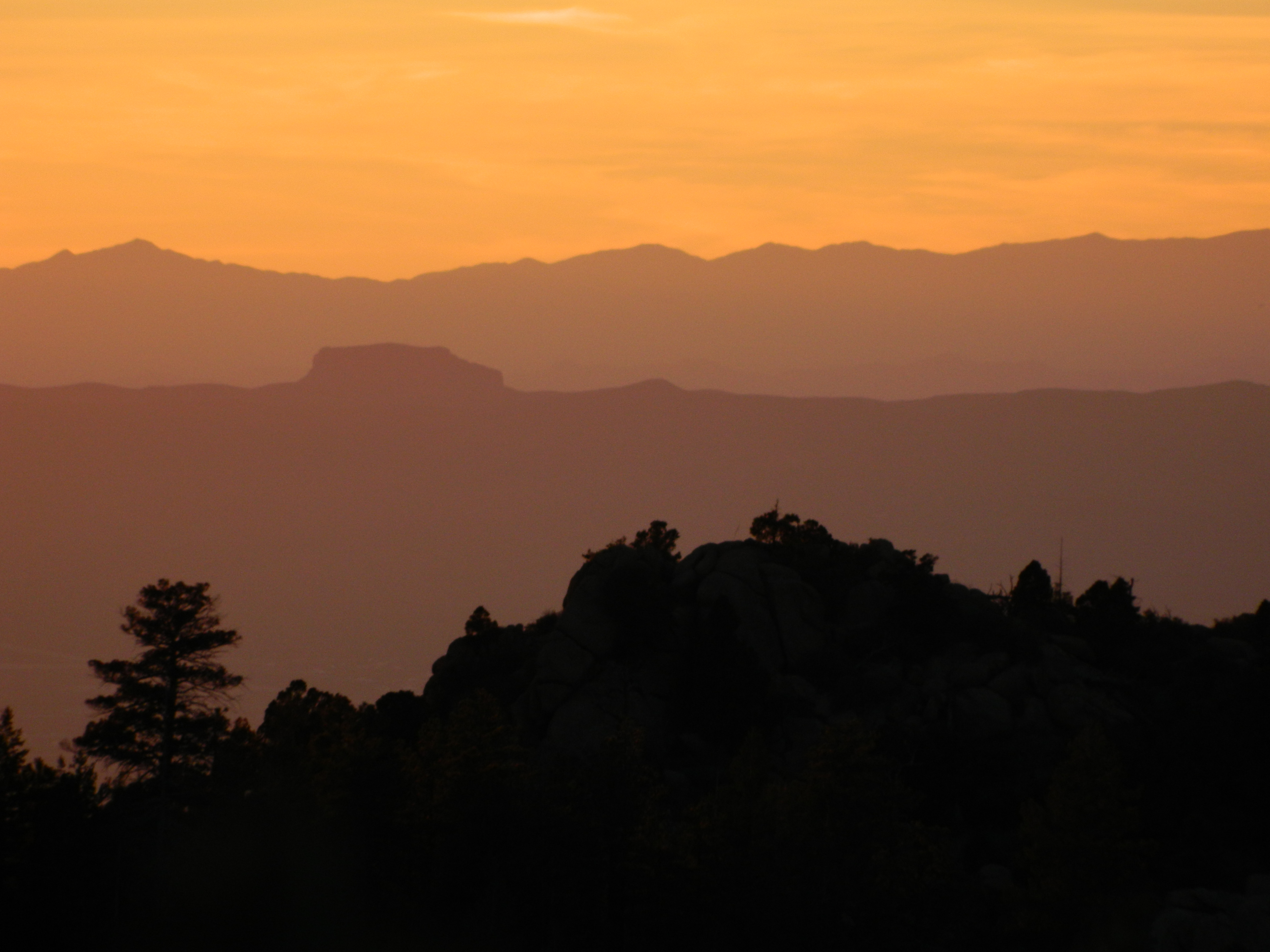
The jagged skyline seen from the top of the Hualapai Mountains is illuminated with intense pastel colors from a sunset

From the Pine Lake Community there are a number of dirt roads that lead out into the mountains. There are two main routes in and out of the community, via the Hualapai Mountain Road, and Flag Mine Road (Arizona Peace Trail). Other ATV routes exist, but are not recommended for general through-way travel, or low clearance vehicles.

From Flag Mine Road one can access many different routes along the "Ridge Road" (a piece of the Arizona Peace Trail) of the Hualapai Mountains, which traverses north–south through the various valleys, canyons and washes. There are a number of other routes and trails, including the Moss Wash Basin which is adopted by a local OHV group. At the end of Flag Mine Road is the Boreana Mine, and the route to Yucca.

The main fire evacuation route is generally maintained to allow low clearance vehicles, but most other roads and atv trails will require high clearance and/ or four-wheel drive. There is a designated fire escape route to get out of out the mountains to the east (toward highway 95) in the event of a wildfire that prevents fleeing using the main road (Antelope Wash Road accessed from Flag Mine Road at the BLM Wildcow Campground) Travel at your own risk. A high-quality OHV/Trail map of the Hualapai Mountains and surrounding areas is generally available at the Mohave County Sheriff's Office (search and rescue map).

== Other sources ==
- Chong Ma; Chad J. Kwiatkowski (December 2025). "Geologic Map of the Hualapai Spring 7.5' Quadrangle, Mohave County, Arizona" (PDF). Data.azgs.arizonba.edu. "Arizona Geological Survey Digital Geologic Map 292"
