= Cat's claw =

Cat's claw or cat's claws (also uña de gato or unha de gato in Spanish or Portuguese) is a common name for several plants:

- Acacia greggii, a tree species native to the southwestern United States and northern Mexico (family Fabaceae)
- Acacia plumosa, a plant species native to Brazil
- Biancaea decapetala, a.k.a. Mauritius or Mysore thorn (family Fabaceae)
- Carpobrotus edulis, or uña de gato (Spanish: "cat's claw"), a plant species in the family Aizoaceae
- Dolichandra unguis-cati, or cat's claw creeper, a Central American climbing vine of the family Bignoniaceae
- Grevillea alpina, a shrub species native to Australia
- Martynia annua, a plant species endemic to Brazil
- Mimosa nuttallii (formerly Schrankia nuttalli), a plant native to the Midwestern United States
- Uncaria guianensis, a plant species found in Guyana and used in traditional medicine
- Uncaria rhynchophylla, a plant species used in traditional Chinese medicine
- Uncaria tomentosa, a plant species found in the tropical jungles of South and Central America and used in traditional medicine
