= Wabayuma Peak =

Summit and wilderness in Mohave County, Arizona

Wabayuma Peak Wilderness
- IUCN category Ib (wilderness area)
- Location within the United States
- Location: Mohave County, Arizona, US
- Nearest city: Yucca, Arizona
- Coordinates: 34°58′21″N 113°59′50″W
- Area: 38,944 acres (158 km^{2})
- Established: 1990
- Governing body: U.S. Department of Interior Bureau of Land Management

Wabayuma Peak Wilderness is a protected wilderness area centered around its namesake Wabayuma Peak, rising to 7,601 feet (2316 m) in the Hualapai Mountains in the U.S. state of Arizona. Established in 1990 under the Arizona Desert Wilderness Act the area is managed by the Bureau of Land Management. This desert and mountain wilderness exists in between the Sonoran and Mojave Deserts, filled with massive ridgelines that rise from the desert floor.

Vegetation in the mountains is mostly chaparral and pinyon-juniper woodlands, on the higher sections close to the peaks there are groves of ponderosa pine and gambel oak.

== See also ==
- List of Arizona Wilderness Areas
- List of U.S. Wilderness Areas
