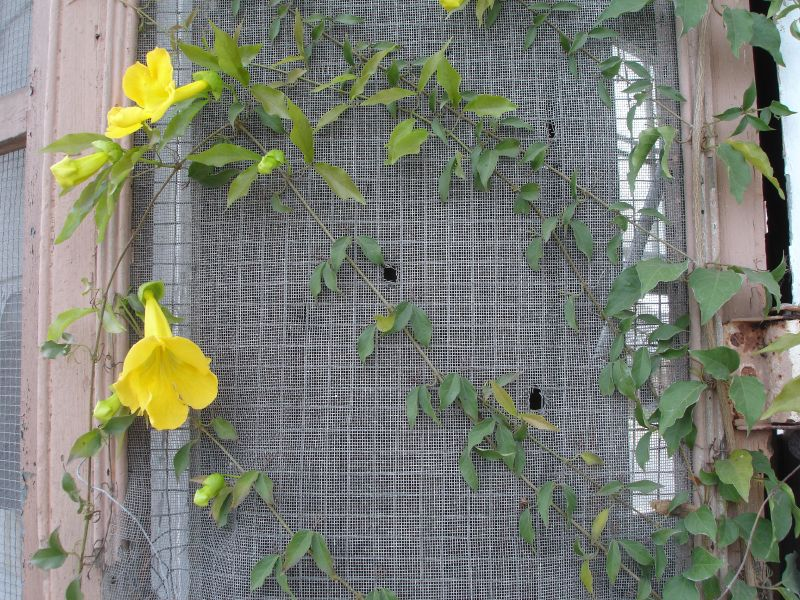
- Dolichandra unguis-cati

Scientific classification
- Kingdom: Plantae
- Clade: Tracheophytes
- Clade: Angiosperms
- Clade: Eudicots
- Clade: Asterids
- Order: Lamiales
- Family: Bignoniaceae
- Tribe: Bignonieae
- Genus: Dolichandra; Cham.

Species
- See text

Synonyms
- List: Batocydia Mart. ex Britton & P.Wilson; Batocydia Mart. ex DC.; Doxantha Miers; Edouardia Corr.Méllo ex Stellfeld; Macfadyena A.DC.; Melloa Bureau; Microbignonia Kraenzl.; Parabignonia Bureau ex K.Schum.; Paradolichandra Hassl.

= Dolichandra =

Genus of flowering plants

Dolichandra is a genus of flowering plants in the family Bignoniaceae, native to Latin America and the Caribbean. They are climbing lianas with trifid and uncate tendrils. The best-known species is Dolichandra unguis-cati.

== Species ==
Currently accepted species include:

- Dolichandra chodatii (Hassl.) L.G.Lohmann
- Dolichandra cynanchoides Cham.
- Dolichandra dentata (K.Schum.) L.G.Lohmann
- Dolichandra hispida (DC.) L.H.Fonseca & L.G.Lohmann
- Dolichandra quadrivalvis (Jacq.) L.G.Lohmann
- Dolichandra steyermarkii (Sandwith) L.G.Lohmann
- Dolichandra uncata (Andrews) L.G.Lohmann
- Dolichandra unguiculata (Vell.) L.G.Lohmann
- Dolichandra unguis-cati (L.) L.G.Lohmann
