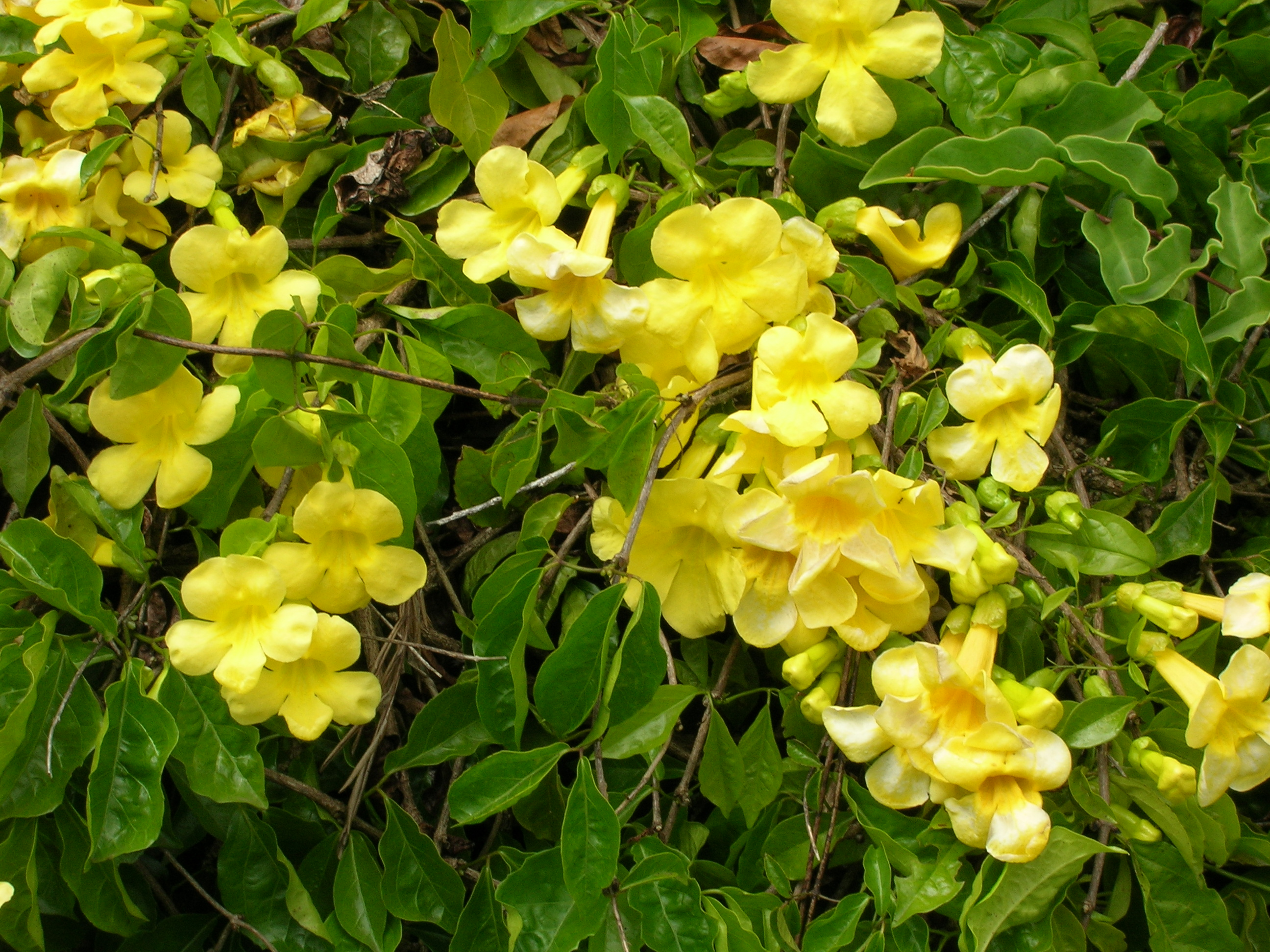

Scientific classification
- Kingdom: Plantae
- Clade: Tracheophytes
- Clade: Angiosperms
- Clade: Eudicots
- Clade: Asterids
- Order: Lamiales
- Family: Bignoniaceae
- Genus: Dolichandra
- Species: D. unguis-cati

Binomial name
- Dolichandra unguis-cati (L.) Miers 1863

Synonyms
- List: Batocydia exoleta Mart. ex DC. nom. inval.; Batocydia unguis Mart. ex DC. nom. inval.; Batocydia unguis-cati (L.) Mart. ex Britton; Bignonia acutistipula Schltdl.; Bignonia californica Brandegee; Bignonia catharinensis Schenck; Bignonia dasyonyx S.F.Blake; Bignonia exoleta Vell.; Bignonia gracilis Lodd.; Bignonia inflata Griseb.; Bignonia lanuginosa Hemsl.; Bignonia pseudounguis Desf.; Bignonia triantha DC.; Bignonia tweediana Lindl.; Bignonia tweediana Griseb. ex Fabris; Bignonia unguis L.; Bignonia unguis Vell. nom. illeg.; Bignonia unguis L. ex DC.; Bignonia unguis-cati L.; Bignonia vespertilia Barb.Rodr.; Dolichandra kohautiana C.Presl; Doxantha acutistipula (Schltdl.) Miers; Doxantha adunca Miers; Doxantha chelephora Miers nom. inval.; Doxantha dasyonyx (S.F.Blake) S.F.Blake; Doxantha exoleta (Vell.) Miers; Doxantha lanuginosa (Hemsl.) Miers nom. inval.; Doxantha mexicana Miers nom. inval.; Doxantha praesignis Miers nom. inval.; Doxantha radicans (DC.) Miers; Doxantha serrulata Miers nom. inval.; Doxantha tenuicula Miers nom. inval.; Doxantha torquata Miers nom. inval.; Doxantha tweediana (Lindl.) Miers; Doxantha unguis (L.) Miers; Doxantha unguis-cati (L.) Miers; Doxantha unguis-cati (L.) Miers ex Rehder; Macfadyena unguis-cati (L.) A.H.Gentry; Microbignonia auristellae Kraenzl.; Spathodea kohautiana (C.Presl) Walp.

= Dolichandra unguis-cati =

Species of flowering plant

Dolichandra unguis-cati, commonly known as cat's claw creeper, funnel creeper, or cat's claw trumpet, In Hawai'i it is called hug-me-tight. is a rapidly growing climbing vine belonging to the family Bignoniaceae. It affects all plant layers of the forest ecosystem spreading rapidly both vertically and horizontally.

== Description ==
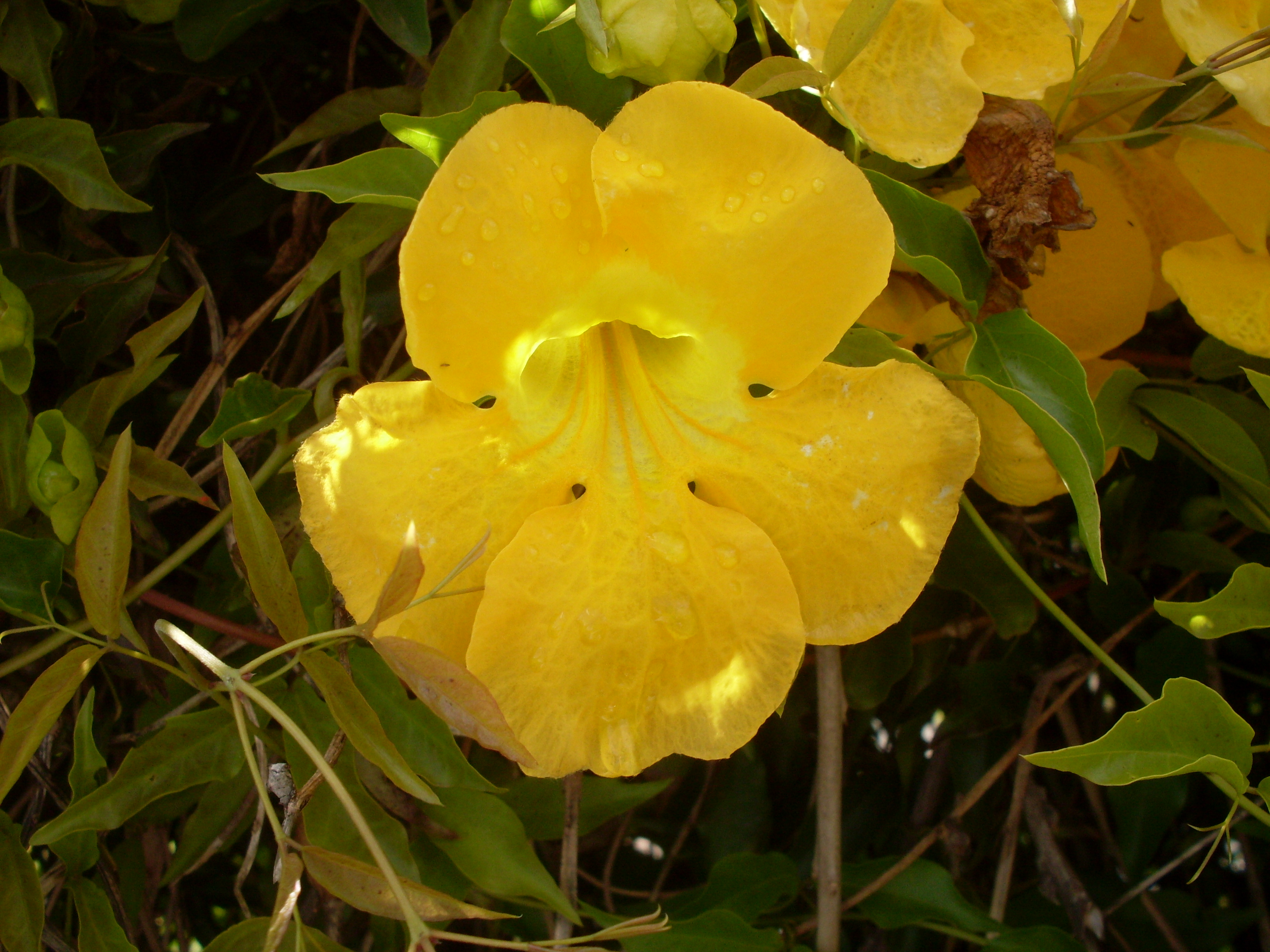
The showy yellow flowers

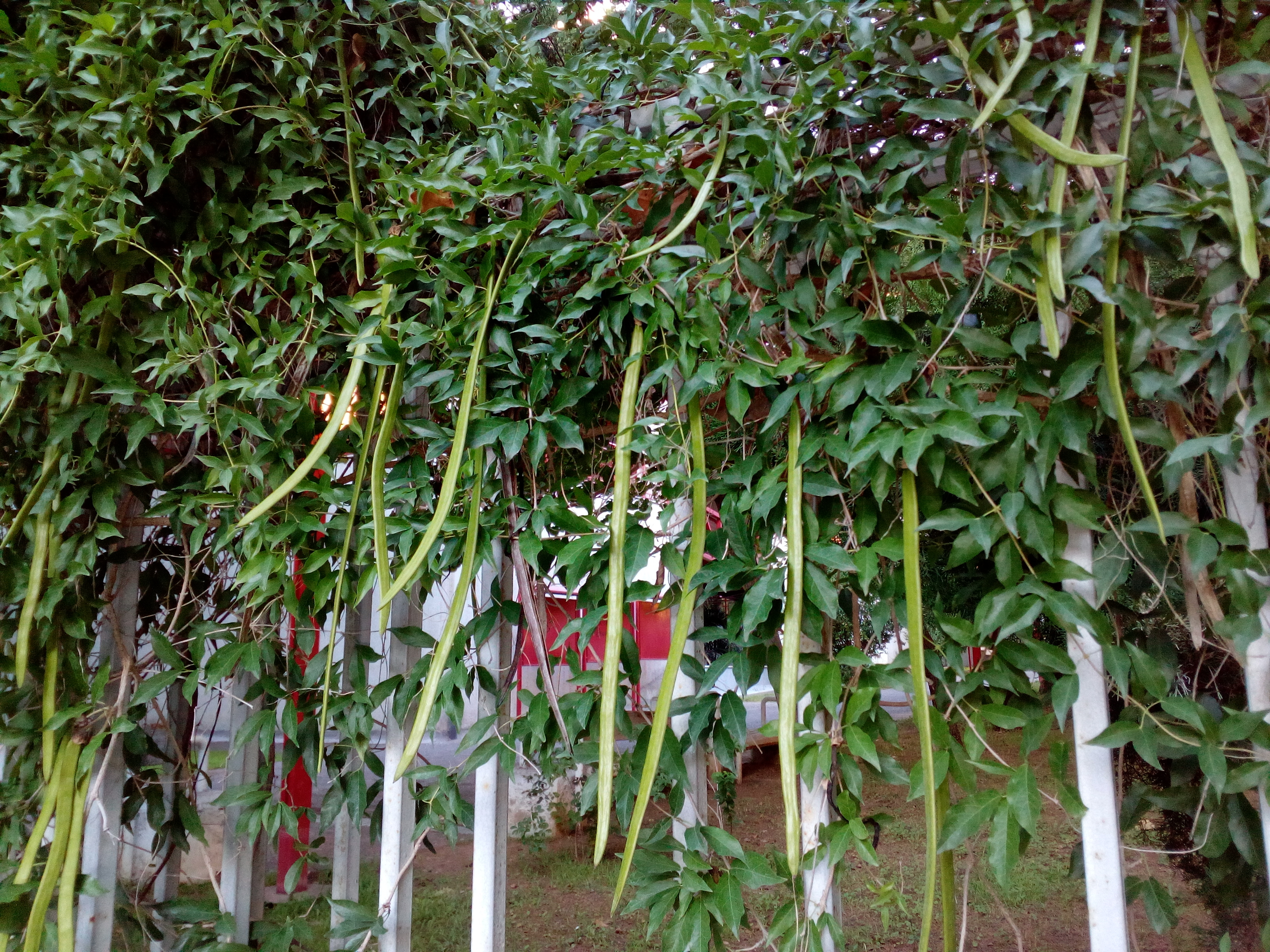
The fruits of Dolichandra unguis-cati are 40–50 cm (16–20 in) long

Dolichandra unguis-cati is a liana with semipersistent foliage and woody stems that can reach a height of 30 metres (98 ft). Thin and small aerial roots are used for climbing. Leaves are dark green, opposite and bifoliate. Leaflets have a length of 3 to 4 cm (1.2 to 1.6 in). Long primary roots extend beneath the soil surface, producing large tubers 40–50 cm (16–20 in) long.

Flowers are yellow, have a diameter of 4 to 5 cm (1.6 to 2.0 in) and can grow alone or in groups of two or three. Flowers occur from late spring through to early summer. Their calyx is narrow trumpet-shaped, 1–2 centimeters long. Their corolla is also tubular and measures 4 to 10 centimeters long. The 5 lobes of the corolla have different sizes. The opening diameter is 1.2 to 2.4 centimeters. Fruits are brown flattened capsules from 25 to 95 cm (9.8 to 37.4 in) long. Each capsule contains 100 to 200 seeds.

== Distribution and habitat ==
This plant is native to the tropical dry forest of Central America, South America (Mexico to Brazil and northern Argentina) and the Caribbean. In these natural areas it occurs from sea level to over 600 metres (2,000 ft) above sea level and where the rainfall is 750 to 2,400 mm (30 to 94 in) per year. It can become invasive due to its fast growth and it is present worldwide, often having been introduced as an ornamental plant to these regions. It can affect all layers of plants of forest ecosystems by rapidly spreading both vertically and horizontally.

It prefers fertile, well-drained soils but can survive in most soils except salty ones. It tolerates the lack of light well, but grows faster in the sun. It is naturalised in Australia, southeastern US, southern Africa, tropical Asia. It grows in orchards and gardens, roadsides and grasslands, in open urban areas, especially in temperate to subtropical regions with medium to high rainfall. It spreads both horizontally, in contact with herbaceous plants, and vertically, up to the canopy.

=== Invasiveness ===
The eradication of this plant is difficult because of its rapid spread linked to the vast root system it develops and the profusion of its seeds. It survives grazing and wildfire, and disturbances tend to stimulate offspring production. The plant is said to be "one of the most destructive exotic vines", where it is especially aggressive in riparian zones and rainforest communities where it strangles trees.

== Medicinal use ==
Its use has been documented as an antidote for snake bites in folk medicine. It is also used to treat dermatitis, in addition to being antipyretic. Furthermore, being anti-inflammatory, it has been used for the treatment of intestinal ailments, venereal disease, rheumatism, dysentery, malaria and oliguria. Its leaves revealed antitumoral and antitrypanosomal activities.

== Gallery ==
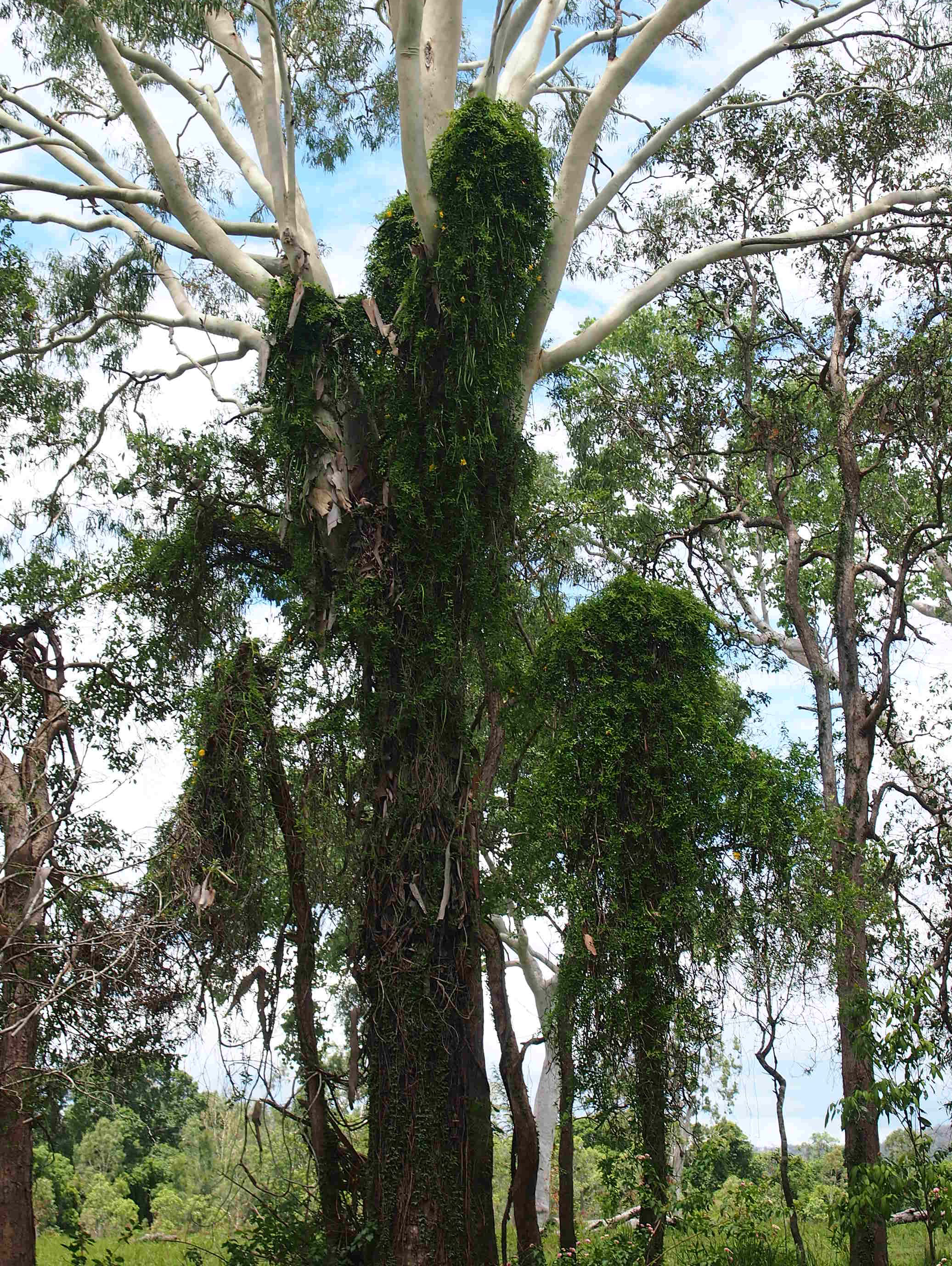
Choking natural vegetation in Australia

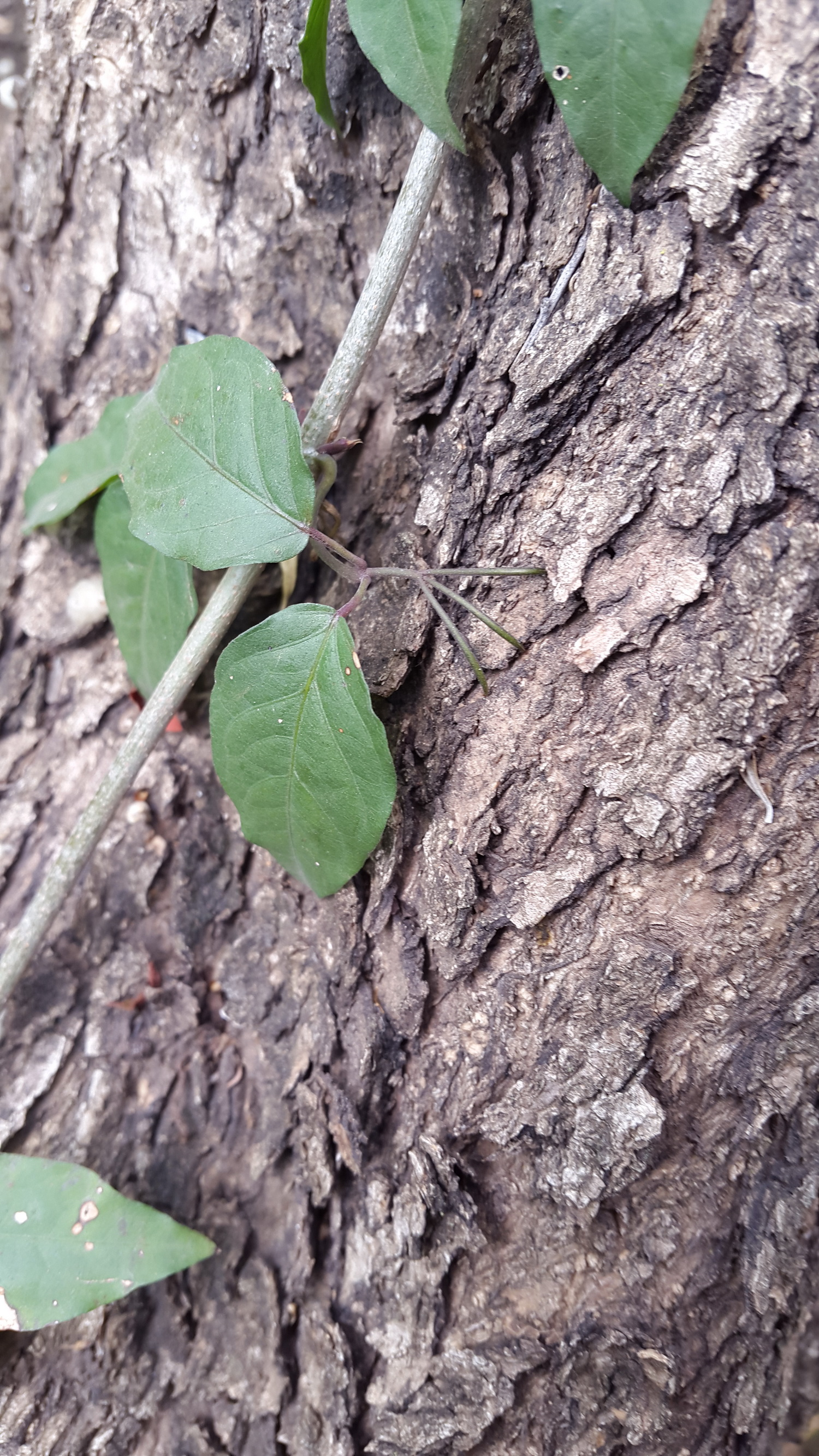
Tendrils that hook into the bark of host trees, aiding the vine to climb the trunk

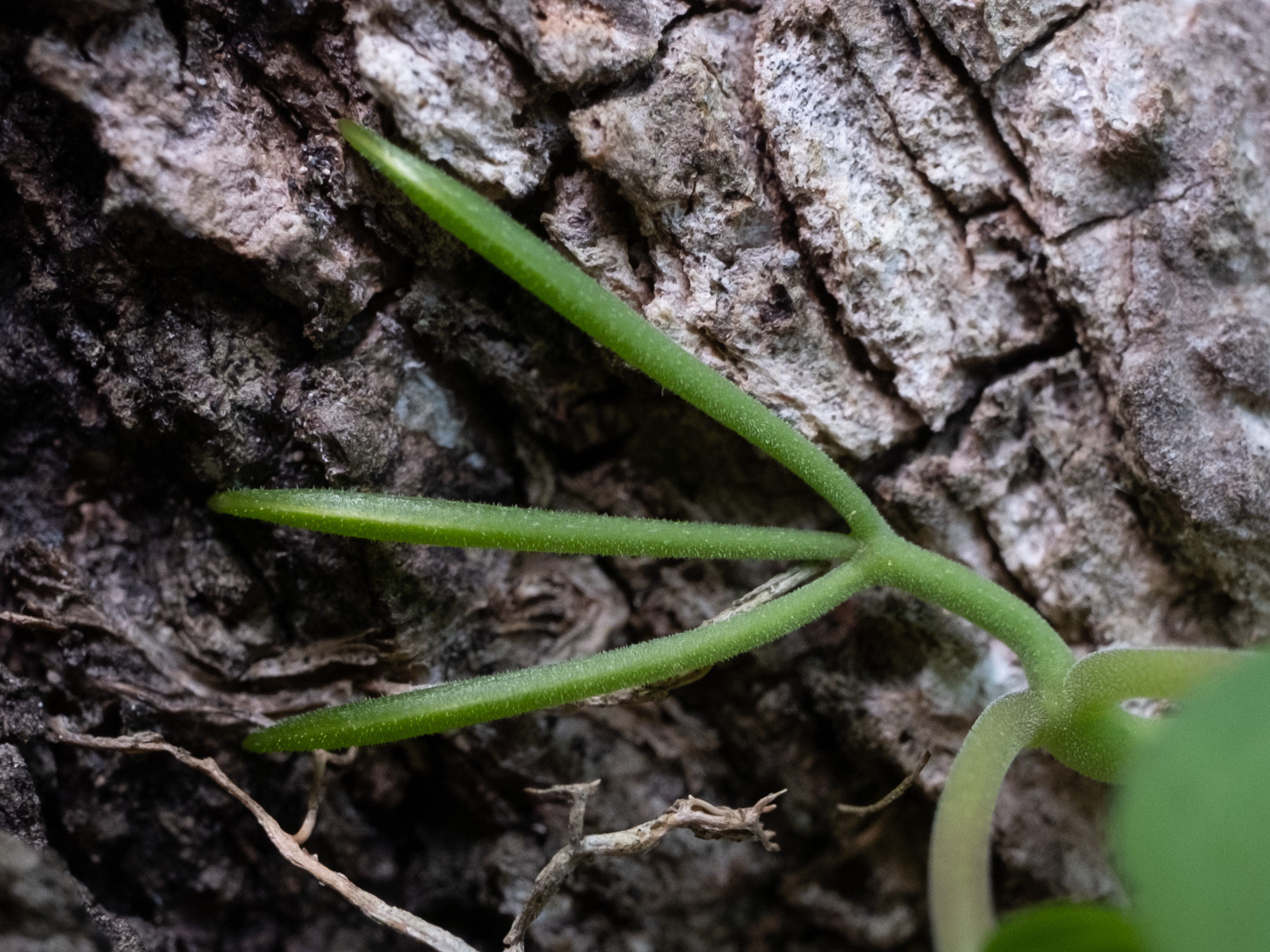
Tendril claw

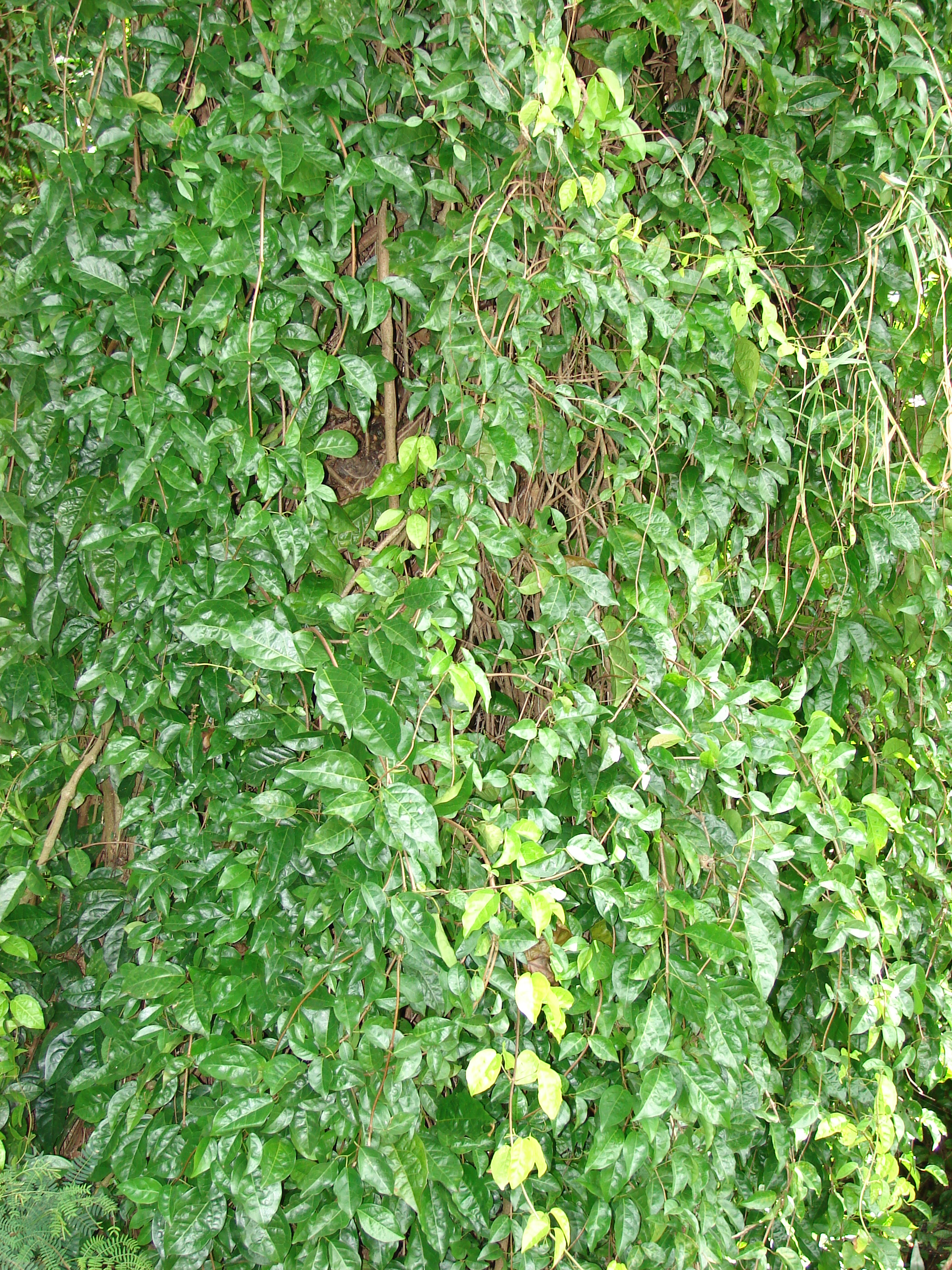
Habit in woodland

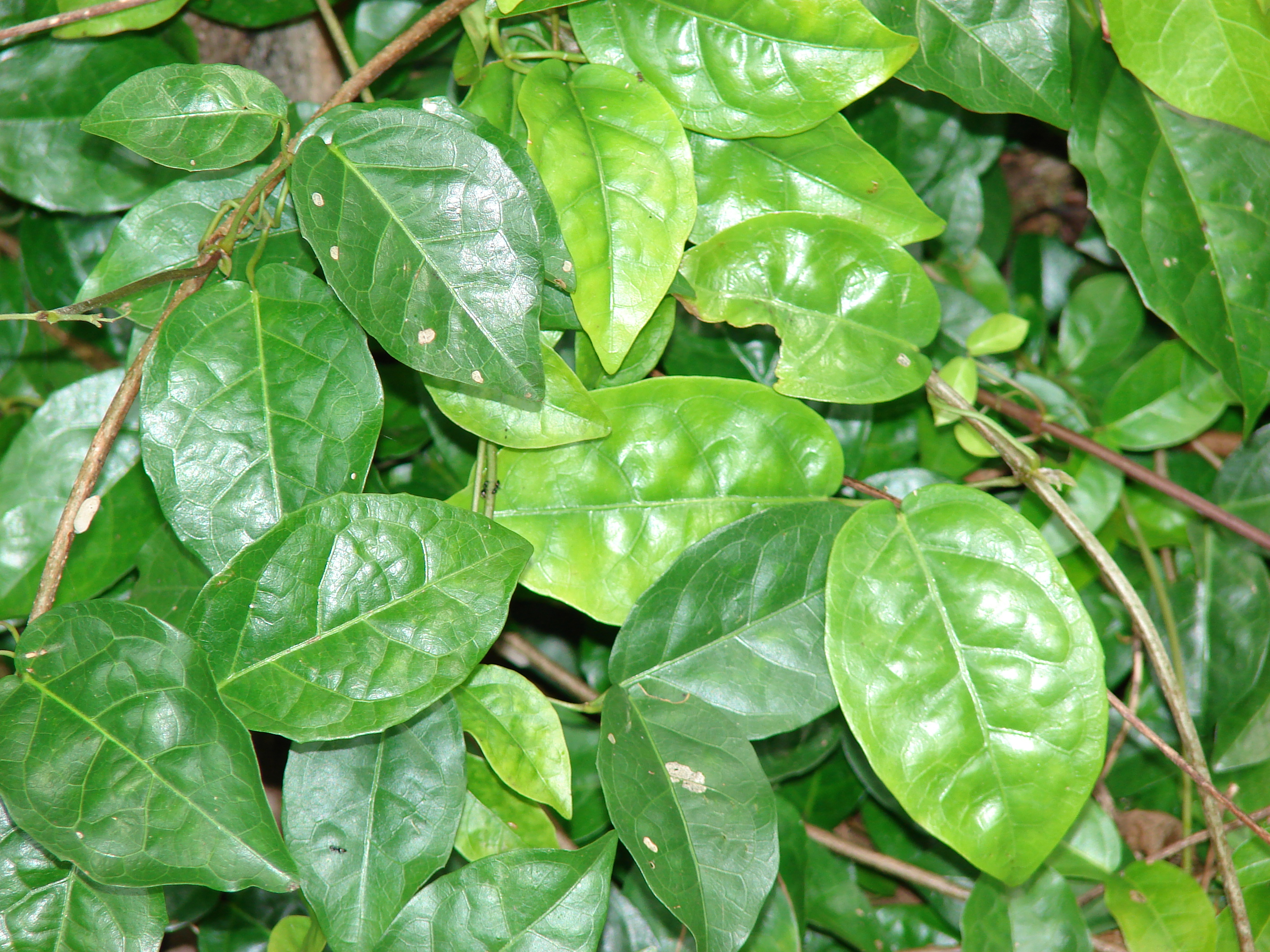
Leaves

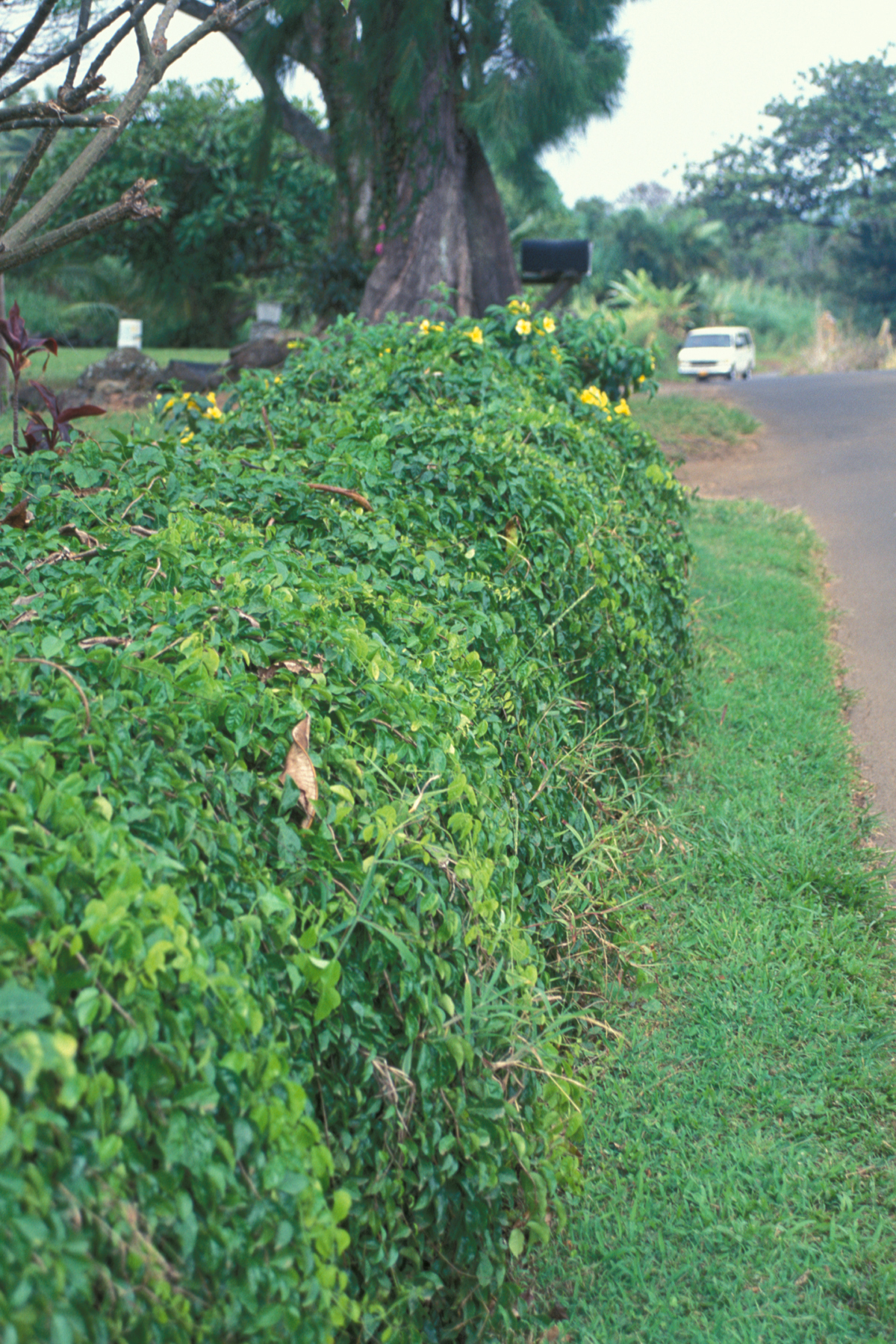
As a hedge

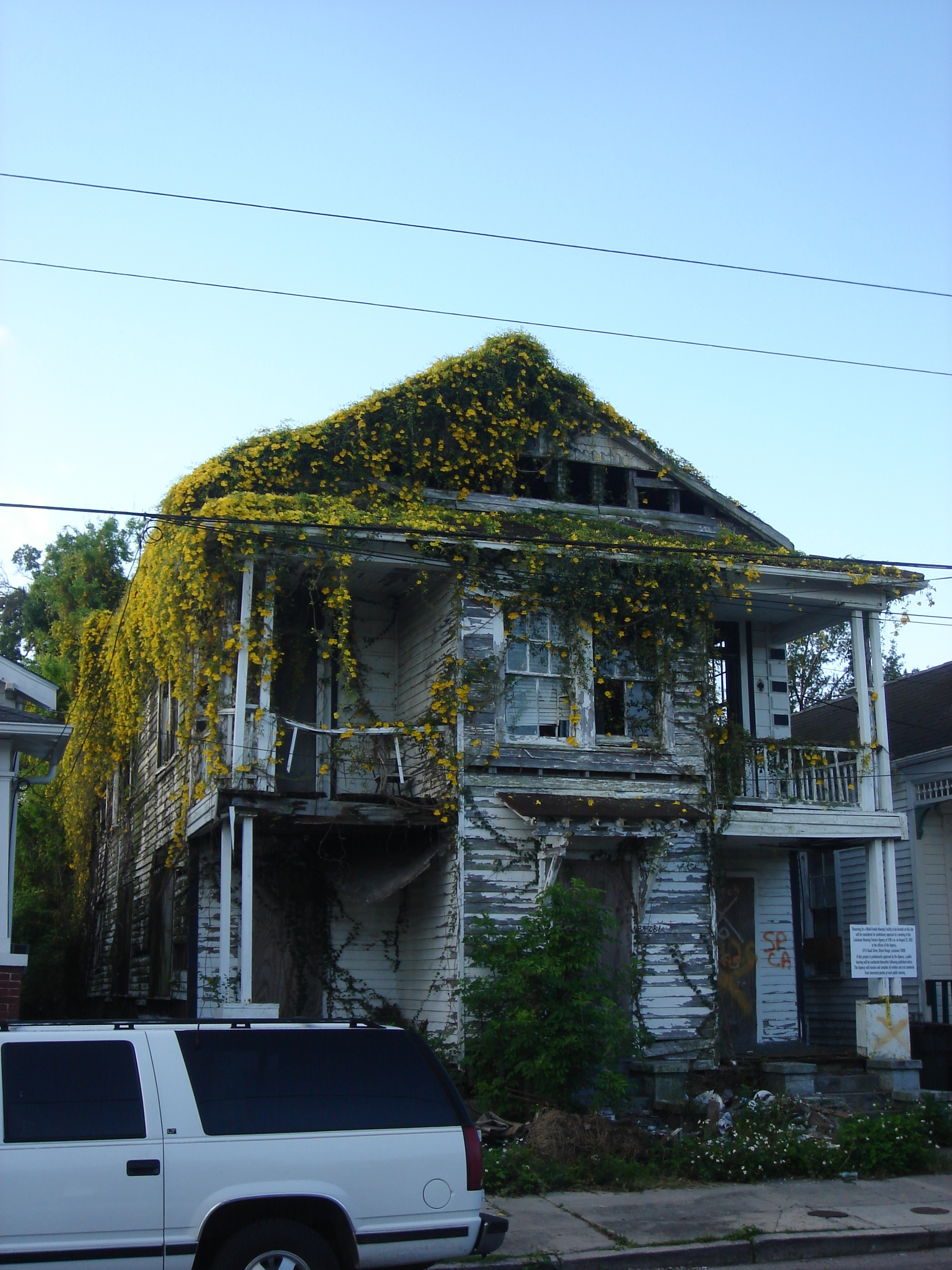
Dilapidated wooden house overgrown with cat's claw vine

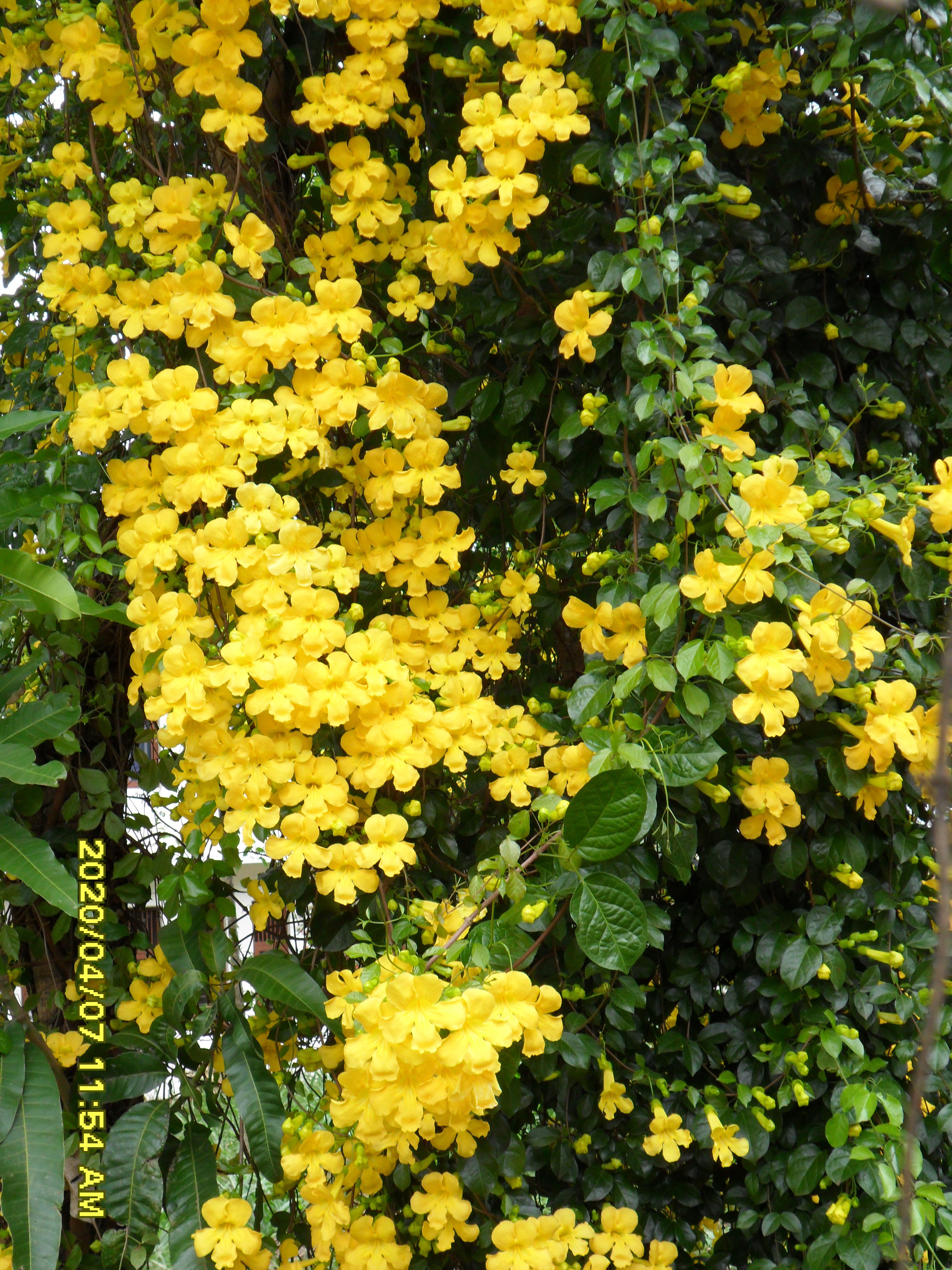
As an ornamental plant

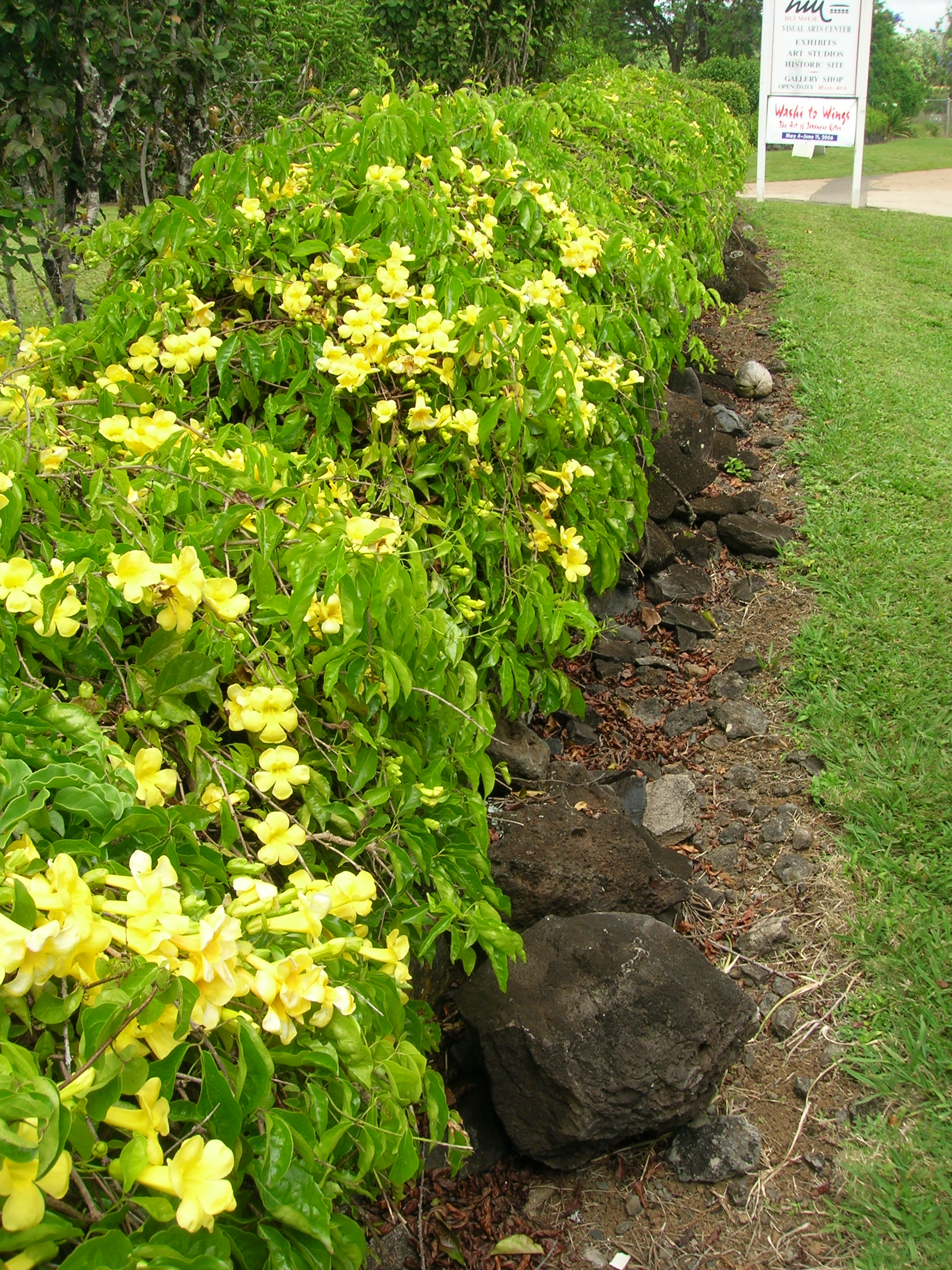
Flowering hedge

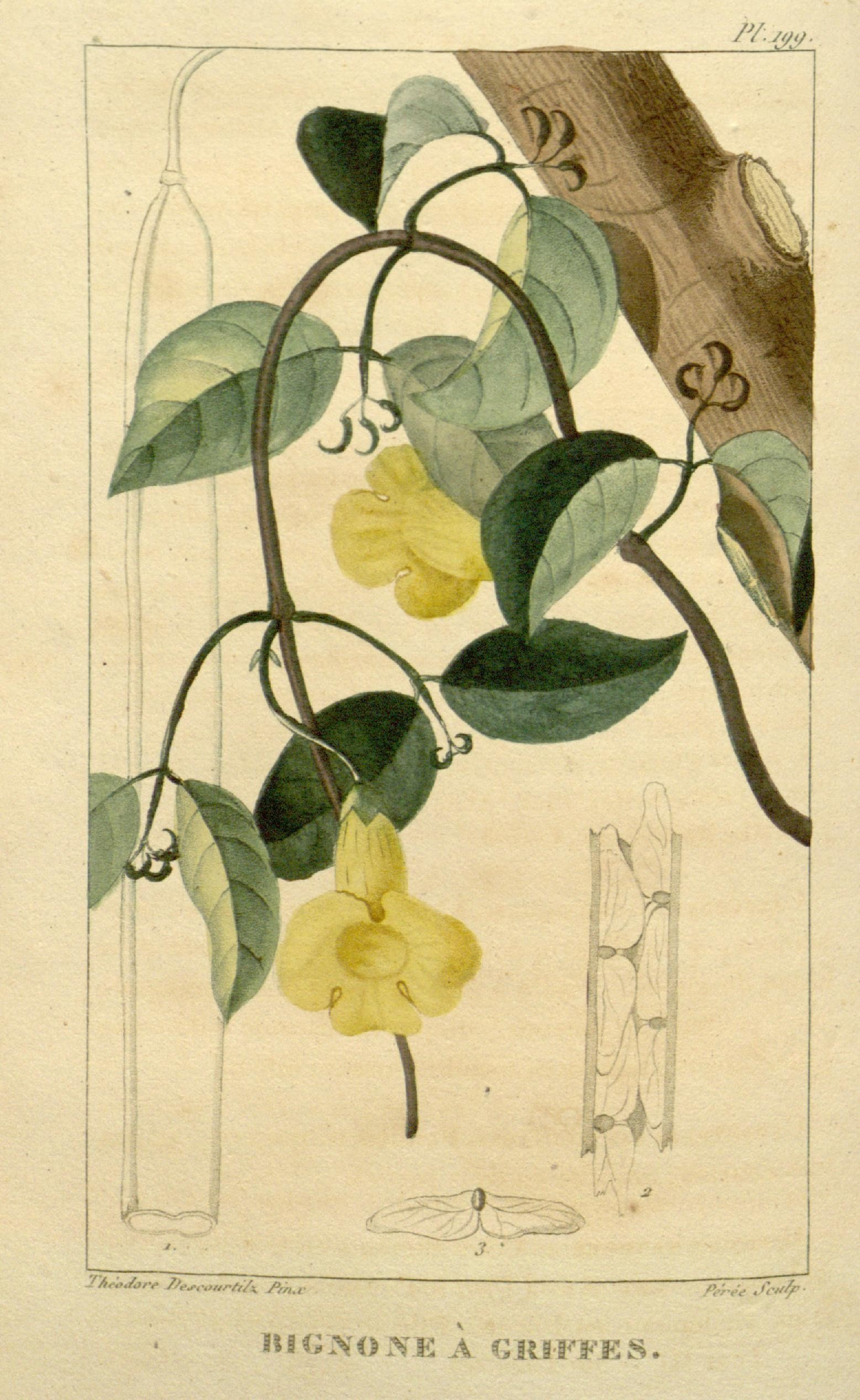
Botanical illustration
