= Hispanics and Latinos in Arizona =

Hispanic and Latino Arizonans are residents of the state of Arizona who are of Hispanic or Latino ancestry. As of the 2010 U.S. Census, Hispanics and Latinos of any race were 30% of the state's population.

== History ==
After the Marcos de Niza expedition in south-eastern Arizona in 1539, Coronado also explored several regions of the present state in 1540–1542, while searching for Cíbola. In 1604, Juan de Oñate travelled to the Colorado River from New Mexico. The Oñate expedition traveled by way of Zuñi and Hopi territories, and the Bill Williams River to the Colorado River. Arizona was incorporated into New Spain. Northern Arizona belonged to Las Californias, the Southwest belonged to Sonora, particularly Pimería Alta, and the southeast belonged to Santa Fe de Nuevo Mexico. However, only a small settler community formed in Arizona. Father Kino's expedition to Arizona established a mission in Tumacacori, located in modern-day Santa Cruz County, Arizona, in 1687. Ten Spaniards members of the expeditionary team settled in the region, although the mission did not prosper. However, this was the first place to have Hispanic occupation in present-day Arizona. The next Hispanic settlements were at San Xavier del Bac and Guevavi. A total of 100 Spanish people may have settled in both areas combined. In 1736 silver mines were discovered in the region, prompting the arrival of possibly 100 traders and miners. However, in 1741, the Viceroy of New Spain prohibited the exploitation of the silver mines, which were being depleted. In 1750, the population may have grown to 1,000 people.

The settler community in Arizona dwindled in 1751 because of the problems it faced: Arizona's main economic source, the silver mines, ran out, so settlers lost interest in the territory. In addition, the Pima people frequently attacked the Spanish communities, causing riots and murders (100 settlers were murdered), as well as many other problems – they burned the settlers' land, poisoned the wells, etc. All this made life in Arizona untenable for the settlers, so most of them left Arizona. So only a small settler community remained in Arizona, including the farmer José Romo de Vivar. In 1752 Tubac was founded by 300 Spanish (mostly soldiers). In 1779 a garrison was established at Tubac. The garrison was occupied by 80 soldiers and possibly their families. In that year the Arizona population grew to 1,120 people, although from 1779 to 1821 the population remained at zero growth.

After the New Spain independence from Spain in 1821, Southern Arizona was incorporated into the Mexican state of Sonora in 1822, although the Hispanic population remained small. Sonora became in the Estado de Occidente in 1824.

Arizona was thinly colonized by Mexico in the 1840s, with little protection from much larger Amerindian population. The U.S. won the Mexican–American War (1846–1848) and Mexico ceded to the U.S. the northern 70% of modern-day Arizona through the Treaty of Guadalupe Hidalgo (1848). On June 8, 1854, the United States bought 29,670-square-mile of land from Mexico. This purchase, called Gadsden Purchase, consisted of the present-day southern Arizona and southwestern New Mexico. Since the second half of the 19th century, thousands of Mexicans have migrated to Arizona.

Arizona's first decades as part of the US (1850–1870) were characterised by the fact that most of its immigrants were Mexican. From 1870 to 1900 Arizona's population grew to 122,000 from just 10,000. Part of this growth was due to Mexican migration. Mexicans accounted for one out of every three immigrants in Arizona in that period.

== Demographics ==
Hispanics made up 32% of Arizona's population. The largest ancestry group in Arizona is Mexican (26%). The southern and central parts of the state are predominantly Mexican American, especially in Santa Cruz County and Yuma County near the Mexican border. In addition, there are an estimated 45,000 people residing in Arizona who are natives of Puerto Rico or of Puerto Rican descent.

In 2003, there were slightly more births to Hispanics in the state than births to non-Hispanic whites for the first time. The gap has widened in 2007, with Hispanics accounting for 45% of all newborns and non-Hispanic whites accounting for 41% of all births. By 2011, those trends temporarily reversed, and non-Hispanic whites accounted for 46% of all births while Hispanic births fell to 39%. After 2011, the number of Hispanic births has once again surpassed that of non-Hispanic whites. Arizona was projected to become a minority-majority state by the year 2015 if population growth trends continued. As of 2010, 21% (1,202,638) of Arizona residents age 5 and older spoke Spanish at home as a primary language.

(self-identified ethnicity, not by birthplace)
Ancestry by origin (2019 surveys)	Population	%
Argentine	3,007	
Bolivian	735	
Chilean	2,526	
Colombian	10,410	
Costa Rican	2,455	
Cuban	18,147	
Dominican	6,267	
Ecuadorian	3,257	
Guatemalan	22,694	
Honduran	7,853	
Mexican	2,024,770	
Nicaraguan	4,822	
Panamanian	4,137	
Paraguayan	528	
Peruvian	9,122	
Puerto Rican	48,793	
Salvadoran	19,556	
"Spanish"	24,727	
"Spaniard"	32,278	
"Spanish American"	417	
Uruguayan	364	
Venezuelan	3,171	
All other	116,649	
Total	2,310,592	

Ancestry by region	Number	%
Mexicans	1,657,668	25.9%
Caribbeans	48,582	0.8%
Central Americans	36,642	0.6%
South Americans	21,895	0.3%
Other Hispanic	130,362	2.0%
Total		

== Spanish language in Arizona ==
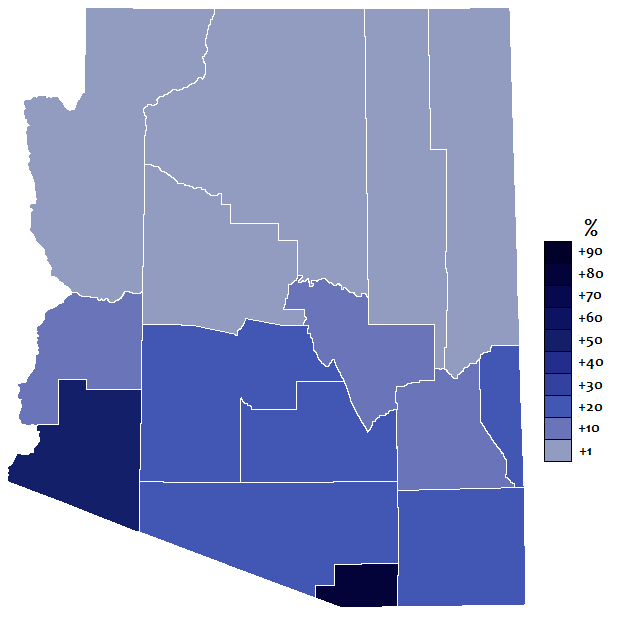
Spanish language in Arizona by county.

The state (like its southwestern neighbors) has had close linguistic and cultural ties with Mexico. The state outside the Gadsden Purchase of 1853 was part of the New Mexico Territory until 1863, when the western half was made into the Arizona Territory. The area of the former Gadsden Purchase contained a majority of Spanish-speakers until the 1940s, although the Tucson area had a higher ratio of anglophones (including Mexican Americans who were fluent in English); the continuous arrival of Mexican settlers increases the number of Spanish speakers.

== Historic Hispanic/Latino population ==
=== Colonial and Mexican Arizona ===
Arizona	Number of people of Hispanic Origin in Arizona	+% of Population of Hispanic Origin in Arizona
1687	10 (Spanish settlers in Tumacacori, first Spanish foundation in modern-day Arizona)	N/A
1732	100	N/A
1736	200	N/A
1741	1,000	N/A
1751	100 (The revolt of the native Pima people resulted in the murder of 100 people, while most of the settlers must have left the area to flee the Pima)	
1752	300	
1757	500	
1768	800	
1779–1820	1,120 (Zero population growth)	
1831	+ 768 (Mexican population in Tucson and Tubac, the main cities of Arizona in term of Mexican population; after Arizona's independence and Amerindian attacks, the population had declined)	

=== American Arizona ===
Arizona	Number of Mexican Origin (1870–1930) and of Hispanic/Latino Origin (1940–2020) in Arizona^{[a]}	+% of Population of Mexican Origin (1870–1930) and of Hispanic/Latino Origin (1940–2020) in Arizona
1850	1,000	+ 51%
1860	+ 3,200	+ 51%
1870	5,891	61%
1880	20,281	50%
1890	17,648	20%
1900	32,000 – 40,000 (Mexican ethnics)	N/A
1910	Variable estimates: 49,044 – 58,445 – 67,041	24.0% (fist data) – 28.6% (second data)
1920	Variable estimates: 88,552 – 101,585 – 109,851	26.5% (first data) – 30.4% (second data)
1930	Variable estimates: 114,120 – 121,955 – 131,543	26.2%(fist data) – 30.2% (third data)
1940	101 902	20.4%
1950	128,928	17.2%
1960	194,021	14.9%
1970	306,609 (15% sample)	17.3%
1980	440,701	16.2%
1990	688,338	18.8%
2000	1,295,617	25.3%
2010	1,895,149	29.6%
2020	2,192,253	30.2%

== Cities and town with Hispanic majority ==
=== Places with between 25,000 and 100,000 people ===
- Avondale (50.3%)
- Drexel Heights (70.6%)
- San Luis (98.7%)
- Yuma (54.8%)

=== Places with between 10,000 and 25,000 people ===
- Douglas (82.6%)
- Eloy (58.0%)
- Nogales (95.0%)
- Rio Rico (formerly Rio Rico Northeast, Rio Rico Northwest, Rio Rico Southeast, and Rio Rico Southwest) (85.3%)
- Somerton (95.2%)

=== Places with fewer than 10,000 people ===
- Aguila (69.4%)
- Arivaca Junction (67.6%)
- Ash Fork (51.4%)
- Avenue B and C (74.7%)
- Aztec (91.5%)
- Beyerville (89.8%)
- Clifton (60.1%)
- Dateland (59.4%)
- Donovan Estates (93.4%)
- Drexel-Alvernon (58.1%)
- Drysdale (90.8%)
- Dudleyville (63.4%)
- El Prado Estates (84.5%)
- Elfrida (54.2%)
- Gadsden (97.1%)
- Gila Bend (65.4%)
- Guadalupe (62.2%)
- Hayden (84.4%)
- Kino Springs (62.5%)
- Littletown (69.5%)
- Mammoth (69.7%)
- Miami (56.0%)
- Morenci (53.1%)
- Naco (83.9%)
- Orange Grove Mobile Manor (98.8%)
- Padre Ranchitos (78.4%)
- Picacho (62.4%)
- Pirtleville (95.3%)
- Poston (55.4%)
- Rancho Mesa Verde (98.1%)
- San Jose (65.4%)
- Solomon (75.8%)
- South Tucson (78.5%)
- Stanfield (66.1%)
- Summit (80.3%)
- Superior (68.5%)
- Tacna (58.0%)
- Theba (95.6%)
- Tolleson (80.1%)
- Tumacacori-Carmen (52.7%)
- Valencia West (65.1%)
- Wall Lane (83.1%)
- Wenden (55.2%)
- Winkelman (82.4%)
- Willcox (50.1%)

== See also ==
- History of Mexican Americans in Tucson
- Californios
- Hispanos of New Mexico
