= List of U.S. communities with Hispanic-majority populations in the 2010 census =

Communities in the United States with a Hispanic-majority population as of the 2010 Census are primarily found in the Southwestern United States and in large metropolitan areas elsewhere in the country. The community with the highest percentage of Hispanic residents (among communities with over 100,000 people) is the unincorporated community of East Los Angeles, California, whose population was 97.1% Hispanic. Among incorporated localities of over 100,000 people, the city of Laredo, Texas has the highest percentage of Hispanic residents at 95.6%.

San Antonio, Texas is the largest Hispanic-majority city in the United States, with 807,000 Hispanics making up 61.2% of its population. New York City has the most Hispanic residents, although it is not Hispanic-majority and as such, is defined as a plurality.

== Arizona ==
=== Places with between 25,000 and 100,000 people ===
- Avondale (50.3%)
- Drexel Heights (70.6%)
- San Luis (98.7%)
- Yuma (54.8%)

=== Places with between 10,000 and 25,000 people ===
- Douglas (82.6%)
- Eloy (58.0%)
- Nogales (95.0%)
- Rio Rico (formerly Rio Rico Northeast, Rio Rico Northwest, Rio Rico Southeast, and Rio Rico Southwest) (85.3%)
- Somerton (95.2%)

=== Places with fewer than 10,000 people ===
- Aguila (69.4%)
- Arivaca Junction (67.6%)
- Ash Fork (51.4%)
- Avenue B and C (74.7%)
- Aztec (91.5%)
- Beyerville (89.8%)
- Clifton (60.1%)
- Dateland (59.4%)
- Donovan Estates (93.4%)
- Drexel-Alvernon (58.1%)
- Drysdale (90.8%)
- Dudleyville (63.4%)
- El Prado Estates (84.5%)
- Elfrida (54.2%)
- Gadsden (97.1%)
- Gila Bend (65.4%)
- Guadalupe (62.2%)
- Hayden (84.4%)
- Kino Springs (62.5%)
- Littletown (69.5%)
- Mammoth (69.7%)
- Miami (56.0%)
- Morenci (53.1%)
- Naco (83.9%)
- Orange Grove Mobile Manor (98.8%)
- Padre Ranchitos (78.4%)
- Picacho (62.4%)
- Pirtleville (95.3%)
- Poston (55.4%)
- Rancho Mesa Verde (98.1%)
- San Jose (65.4%)
- Solomon (75.8%)
- South Tucson (78.5%)
- Stanfield (66.1%)
- Summit (80.3%)
- Superior (68.5%)
- Tacna (58.0%)
- Theba (95.6%)
- Tolleson (80.1%)
- Tumacacori-Carmen (52.7%)
- Valencia West (65.1%)
- Wall Lane (83.1%)
- Wenden (55.2%)
- Winkelman (82.4%)
- Willcox (50.1%)

== Arkansas ==
=== Places with fewer than 10,000 people ===
- De Queen (53.5%)
- Danville (52.6%)
- Wickes (52.1%)

== California ==
See List of California communities with Hispanic majority populations in the 2010 census

== Colorado ==
=== Places with between 10,000 and 25,000 people ===
- Berkley (55.7%)
- Sherrelwood (58.9%)
- Welby (54.7%)

=== Places with fewer than 10,000 people ===
- Alamosa (53.2%)
- Alamosa East (54.1%)
- Antonito (85.1%)
- Avondale (59.8%)
- Blanca (60.8%)
- Cattle Creek (65.4%)
- Capulin (83.0%)
- Center (87.4%)
- Conejos (82.8%)
- Crowley (54.0%)
- Del Norte (56.3%)
- Derby (64.2%)
- Dotsero (81.4%)
- Fort Garland (85.0%)
- Fort Lupton (55.0%)
- Garden City (66.2%)
- Gilcrest (55.5%)
- Granada (70.6%)
- Jansen (58.0%)
- La Jara (62.3%)
- Log Lane Village (50.1%)
- Lynn (66.7%)
- Monte Vista (61.3%)
- Olathe (50.0%)
- Rocky Ford (59.1%)
- Romeo (79.5%)
- Salt Creek (86.0%)
- San Acacio (62.5%)
- San Luis (84.3%)
- Starkville (72.9%)
- Trinidad (50.0%)
- Twin Lakes (Adams County) (60.7%)
- Walsenburg (56.0%)
- Weston (72.7%)
- Valdez (61.7%)

== Connecticut ==
- The Hill (06519 zipcode) - 50.5% Hispanic

== Florida ==
=== Places with over 100,000 people ===
- Hialeah (94.7%)
- Miami (70.0%)

=== Places with between 25,000 and 100,000 people ===
- Buenaventura Lakes (69.6%)
- Coral Gables (53.6%)
- Country Club (78.8%)
- Cutler Bay (54.5%)
- Doral (79.5%)
- Egypt Lake-Leto (60.0%)
- Fontainebleau (91.6%)
- Homestead (62.9%)
- Kendale Lakes (86.5%)
- Kendall West (88.3%)
- Kendall (63.7%)
- Kissimmee (58.9%)
- Meadow Woods (67.2%)
- Miami Beach (53.0%)
- Miami Lakes (81.1%)
- Poinciana (51.2%)
- Richmond West (78.5%)
- South Miami Heights (68.0%)
- Tamiami (92.7%)
- The Hammocks (76.9%)
- University Park (85.0%)
- West Little River (50.6%)
- Westchester (91.1%)

=== Places with between 10,000 and 25,000 people ===
- Azalea Park (59.0%)
- Coral Terrace (88.6%)
- Country Walk (70.2%)
- Glenvar Heights (66.5%)
- Golden Gate (58.5%)
- Hialeah Gardens (94.9%)
- Immokalee (75.6%)
- Key Biscayne (61.6%)
- Leisure City (74.9%)
- Miami Springs (71.2%)
- Olympia Heights (85.8%)
- Palm Springs (50.6%)
- Princeton (60.9%)
- Sunset (80.3%)
- Sweetwater (95.5%)
- The Crossings (69.4%)
- Three Lakes (65.4%)
- Westwood Lakes (86.0%)

=== Places with fewer than 10,000 people ===
- Acacia Villas (Palm Beach County CDP)(63.2%)
- Bowling Green (58.4%)
- Brewster (100.0%)
- Broadview Park (59.6%)
- Dade City North (63.0%)
- Dover (67.9%)
- Fellsmere (81.1%)
- Gun Club Estates (62.6%)
- Harlem Heights (70.2%)
- Indiantown (64.6%)
- Islandia (88.9%)
- Kenwood Estates (Palm Beach County CDP) (62.3%)
- Lakewood Gardens (Palm Beach County CDP) (62.3%)
- Medley (92.2%)
- Montura (Montura Ranch Estates) (69.1%)
- Naples Manor (71.9%)
- Naranja (51.6%)
- North Bay Village (58.0%)
- Palm Springs North (77.7%)
- Pierson (54.1%)
- Pine Air (Palm Beach County CDP)(61.8%)
- Pine Manor (60.2%)
- Port LaBelle (53.4%)
- Sky Lake (52.1%)
- Southeast Arcadia (56.7%)
- Tice (62.2%)
- Virginia Gardens (77.3%)
- West Miami (90.2%)
- Wahneta (64.7%)
- Wimauma (73.4%)
- Zolfo Springs (64.4%)

== Georgia ==
=== Places with fewer than 10,000 people ===
- Chamblee (58.5%)
- Fair Oaks (52.7%)
- Lakeview Estates (85.6%)
- Lumpkin (51.1%)

=== Places between 10,000 and 25,000 people ===
- Dalton (50.85%)

== Idaho ==
=== Places with fewer than 10,000 people ===
- Aberdeen (54.1%)
- Minidoka (76.8%)
- Roberts (52.4%)
- Wilder (75.9%)

== Illinois ==
=== Places with between 25,000 and 100,000 people ===
- Berwyn (2010, 59.44%)
- Carpentersville (50.1%)
- Cicero (86.6%)
- Melrose Park (69.6%)
- Waukegan (53.4%)
- West Chicago (51.1%)

=== Places with between 10,000 and 25,000 people ===
- Northlake (52.9%)
- Summit (63.7%)

=== Places with fewer than 10,000 people ===
- DePue (54.7%)
- Fairmont City (71.4%)
- Highwood (56.9%)
- Park City (65.2%)
- Posen (53.0%)
- Stickney (50.9%)
- Stone Park (88.1%)

== Indiana ==
=== Places with between 25,000 and 100,000 people ===
- East Chicago (50.9%)

=== Places with fewer than 10,000 people ===
- Ligonier (51.5%)

== Iowa ==
=== Places with fewer than 10,000 people ===
- Conesville (63.0%)
- West Liberty (52.2%)

== Kansas ==
=== Places with between 25,000 and 100,000 people ===
- Dodge City (57.5%)

=== Places with between 10,000 and 25,000 people ===
- Liberal (58.7%)

=== Places with fewer than 10,000 people ===
- Wilroads Gardens (62.4%)

== Maryland ==
=== Places with between 10,000 and 25,000 people ===
- East Riverdale (53.3%)
- Langley Park (76.6%)

=== Places with fewer than 10,000 people ===
- Riverdale Park (50.0%)

== Massachusetts ==
=== Places with between 25,000 and 100,000 people ===
- Chelsea (62.1%)
- Lawrence (73.8%)

=== Places where Hispanics outnumber any specific non-Hispanic racial group ===
- Holyoke (48.4%)

== Missouri ==
=== Places with fewer than 10,000 people ===
- Southwest City (50.8%)

== Nebraska ==
=== Places with fewer than 100,000 people ===
- South Omaha (15.5%)

=== Places with between 10,000 and 25,000 people ===
- Lexington (60.4%)

=== Places with fewer than 10,000 people ===
- Schuyler (65.4%)

== Nevada ==
=== Places with fewer than 10,000 people ===
- Jackpot (55.6%)
- West Wendover (61.7%)

=== Places where Hispanics outnumber any specific non-Hispanic racial group ===
- Sunrise Manor, Nevada - 48.5%
- Winchester, Nevada - 44.6%

== New Jersey ==
=== Places with over 100,000 people ===
- Elizabeth (65.72%)
- Paterson (61.89%)

=== Places with between 25,000 and 100,000 people ===
- North Bergen (68.4%)
- Passaic (71.0%)
- Perth Amboy (78.1%)
- Union City (84.7%)
- West New York (78.1%)
- Plainfield (54.58%)

=== Places with between 10,000 and 25,000 people ===
- Dover (69.4%)
- Fairview (54.6%)
- Guttenberg (64.8%)

=== Places with fewer than 10,000 people ===
- East Newark (61.4%)
- Prospect Park (52.1%)
- Victory Gardens (63.0%)

Places with a plurality Hispanic population

• Bround Brook (48.66%)

• New Brunswick (49.93%)

== New Mexico ==
See List of New Mexico communities with Hispanic majority populations in the 2000 census

== New York ==
=== Places with over 100,000 people ===
- The Bronx (53.5%)

=== Places with between 25,000 and 100,000 people ===
- Brentwood (61.0%)
- Central Islip (52.1%)

=== Places with 10,000 to 25,000 people ===
- Haverstraw (54.1%)
- North Bay Shore (59.4%)
- Port Chester (59.4%)

=== Places with fewer than 10,000 people ===
- Brewster (56.0%)
- Sleepy Hollow (51.0%)

== North Carolina ==
=== Places with fewer than 10,000 people ===
- Robbins (50.3%)

== Oklahoma ==
=== Places with between 10,000 and 25,000 people ===
- Guymon (51.5%)

=== Places with fewer than 10,000 people ===
- Optima (76.1%)
- Ringwood (50.3%)

== Oregon ==
=== Places with between 25,000 and 100,000 people ===
- Woodburn (58.9%)

=== Places with between 10,000 and 25,000 people ===
- Cornelius (50.1%)

=== Places with fewer than 10,000 people ===
- Biggs Junction (50.0%)
- Boardman (61.7%)
- Gervais (67.1%)
- Labish Village (67.0%)
- Odell (63.5%)
- Malin (57.8%)
- Nyssa (60.5%)

== Pennsylvania ==
=== Places with over 100,000 people ===
- Allentown (52.5%)

=== Places with between 25,000 and 100,000 people ===
- Reading (58.2%)

=== Places with fewer than 10,000 people ===
- Avondale (59.0%)
- Toughkenamon (58.0%)

== Rhode Island ==
=== Places with between 10,000 and 25,000 people ===
- Central Falls (60.3%)

== Texas ==
See List of Texas communities with Hispanic majority populations in the 2000 census

== Utah ==
=== Places with fewer than 10,000 people ===
- Beryl Junction (51.8%)
- Hideout (77.0%)
- Wendover (68.3%)

== Washington ==
=== Places with between 25,000 and 100,000 people ===
- Pasco (55.7%)

=== Places with between 10,000 and 25,000 people ===
- Grandview (79.7%)
- Sunnyside (82.2%)

=== Places with fewer than 10,000 people ===
- Basin City (81.7%)
- Brewster (73.0%)
- Bridgeport (76.7%)
- Buena (81.3%)
- Cowiche (67.8%)
- Chelan Falls (51.4%)
- Desert Aire (51.3%)
- George (75.0%)
- Granger (88.2%)
- Harrah (55.4%)
- Mabton (91.9%)
- Mattawa (95.7%)
- Mesa (75.3%)
- Othello (74.7%)
- Outlook (83.6%)
- Quincy (74.3%)
- Rock Island (51.4%)
- Roosevelt (51.9%)
- Royal City (88.7%)
- South Wenatchee (62.7%)
- Tieton (64.4%)
- Toppenish (82.6%)
- Wapato (84.2%)
- Warden (77.1%)

== Wisconsin ==
=== Places with fewer than 10,000 people ===
- Arcadia (63.6%)
- Curtiss (51.9%)

== See also ==
- List of U.S. cities with large Hispanic populations
- List of U.S. communities with Hispanic-majority populations in the 2000 census
- List of U.S. counties with Hispanic- or Latino-majority populations
- List of U.S. communities with African-American majority populations in 2010
- List of U.S. communities with Asian-American majority populations
- List of U.S. communities with Native-American majority populations
