= List of U.S. communities with Hispanic-majority populations in the 2000 census =

The following is a list of United States cities, towns, and census-designated places in which a majority (over 50%) of the population is Hispanic or Latino, according to data from the 2000 Census. This list does not include cities such as Los Angeles, California or Houston, Texas in which, according to the 2000 Census, merely a plurality (as opposed to a majority) of the residents are Hispanic. The list below is organized by state and, within each state, by population size. The percentage of each city's population that is Hispanic is listed in parentheses next to the city's name. The largest incorporated city with the highest proportion of Hispanics is Huron (population 6,306), California; according to the 2000 U.S. Census, Huron is 98.27% Hispanic. The largest city with a Hispanic majority is San Antonio, Texas, and the highest percentage for any major U.S. city is El Paso, Texas at 76%. Thirty-one states do not have any communities that are majority-Hispanic. The following demographics are from the 2000 census.

Note: According to the U.S. Census, Hispanics can be of any race.

== Arizona ==
=== Arizona places with between 10,000 and 25,000 people ===
- Douglas (86.0%)
- Drexel Heights (60.1%)
- Eloy (74.4%)
- Nogales (93.6%)
- San Luis (89.1%)

=== Arizona places with fewer than 10,000 people ===
- Ash Fork (51.4%)
- Clifton (55.9%)
- Drexel-Alvernon (58.1%)
- Dudleyville (59.0%)
- El Mirage (66.9%)
- Gadsden (93.8%)
- Gila Bend (52.6%)
- Guadalupe (72.3%)
- Hayden (84.5%)
- Littletown (50.5%)
- Mammoth (73.0%)
- Maricopa (70.4%)
- Miami (54.4%)
- Mojave Ranch Estates (78.6%)
- Naco (82.5%)
- Pirtleville (95.0%)
- Poston (77.1%)
- Rio Rico Northeast (67.1%)
- Rio Rico Northwest (87.3%)
- Rio Rico Southeast (85.0%)
- Rio Rico Southwest (85.1%)
- Somerton (95.2%)
- South Tucson (81.2%)
- Stanfield (61.6%)
- Summit (63.5%)
- Superior (69.1%)
- Tacna (50.8%)
- Tolleson (78.0%)
- Tumacacori-Carmen (58.0%)
- Valencia West (68.4%)
- Winkelman (74.7%)

== California ==
See List of California communities with Hispanic majority populations in the 2000 census

== Colorado ==
=== Colorado places with between 10,000 and 25,000 people ===
- Commerce City (52.9%)

=== Colorado places with fewer than 10,000 people ===
- Alamosa East (54.4%)
- Antonito (90.3%)
- Avondale (64.1%)
- Blanca (67.0%)
- Center (86.1%)
- Del Norte (57.4%)
- Fort Garland (72.2%)
- Garden City (68.3%)
- Gilcrest (54.9%)
- Granada (62.5%)
- La Jara (62.9%)
- Log Lane Village (52.8%)
- Monte Vista (58.2%)
- Red Cliff (61.9%)
- Rocky Ford (57.1%)
- Romeo (77.1%)
- Salt Creek (79.3%)
- San Luis (88.8%)
- Starkville (64.1%)
- Walsenburg (51.0%)

== Florida ==
=== Places with over 100,000 people ===
- Hialeah (92.3%)
- Miami (65.8%)

=== Places with between 25,000 and 100,000 people ===
- Country Club (60.3%)
- Fontainebleau (87.2%)
- Homestead (51.8%)
- Kendale Lakes (76.6%)
- Kendall West (79.0%)
- Kendall (50.0%)
- Miami Beach (53.5%)
- Richmond West (70.0%)
- South Miami Heights (56.2%)
- Tamiami (87.0%)
- The Hammocks (65.3%)
- University Park (82.7%)
- Westchester (85.3%)

=== Places with fewer than 25,000 people ===
- Buenaventura Lakes (54.6%)
- Coral Terrace (82.1%)
- Country Walk (56.1%)
- Dade City North (56.5%)
- Doral (67.4%)
- Dover (50.1%)
- Fellsmere (73.0%)
- Glenvar Heights (55.5%)
- Harlem Heights (55.0%)
- Hialeah Gardens (89.8%)
- Immokalee (71.0%)
- Leisure City (65.3%)
- Meadow Woods (52.8%)
- Medley (72.6%)
- Miami Lakes (66.5%)
- Miami Springs (59.6%)
- Naples Manor (69.3%)
- Olympia Heights (76.3%)
- Palm Springs North (64.9%)
- Pierson (62.4%)
- Sunset (69.7%)
- Sweetwater (93.2%)
- The Crossings (56.1%)
- Virginia Gardens (67.3%)
- West Miami (84.0%)
- Westwood Lakes (76.3%)
- Wimauma (72.9%)
- Zolfo Springs (53.6%)

== Georgia ==
=== Places with fewer than 25,000 people ===
- Chamblee (56.4%)

== Idaho ==
=== Places with fewer than 25,000 people ===
- Hamer (50.0%)
- Minidoka (77.5%)
- Roberts (57.5%)
- Wilder (76.4%)

== Illinois ==
=== Places with between 25,000 and 100,000 people ===
- Cicero (78.4%)

=== Places with fewer than 25,000 people ===
- Melrose Park (53.9%)
- Stone Park (79.1%)
- Fairmont City (55.4%)

== Indiana ==
=== Places with between 25,000 and 100,000 people ===
- East Chicago (51.6%)

== Maryland ==
=== Places with fewer than 25,000 people ===
- Langley Park (63.4%)

== Massachusetts ==
=== Places with between 25,000 and 100,000 people ===
- Lawrence (59.7%)

== Nebraska ==
=== Places with fewer than 25,000 people ===
- Lexington (51.2%)

== Nevada ==
=== Places with fewer than 25,000 people ===
- West Wendover (56.9%)

== New Jersey ==
=== Places with over 100,000 people ===
- Paterson (50.1%)

=== Places with between 25,000 and 100,000 people ===
- North Bergen (57.3%)
- Passaic (62.5%)
- Perth Amboy (69.8%)
- Union City (82.3%)
- West New York (78.7%)

=== Places with fewer than 25,000 people ===
- Dover (57.9%)
- Guttenberg (54.3%)
- Victory Gardens (50.6%)

== New Mexico ==
See List of New Mexico communities with Hispanic majority populations

== New York ==
=== Places with between 25,000 and 100,000 people ===
- Brentwood (54.3%)

=== Places with 10,000 to 25,000 people ===
- Haverstraw (59.3%)
- North Bay Shore (50.8%)

== Oregon ==
=== Places with 10,000 to 25,000 people ===
- Woodburn (50.1)

=== Places with fewer than 10,000 people ===
- Boardman (50.1%)
- Gervais (65.2%)
- Labish Village (52.4%)
- Malin (54.1%)
- Nyssa (57.2%)

== Texas ==
See List of Texas communities with Hispanic majority populations

== Utah ==
=== Places with fewer than 10,000 people ===
- Wendover (68.6%)

== Virginia ==
=== Places with fewer than 10,000 people ===
- Seven Corners, Virginia (50.1%)

== Washington ==
=== Places with between 25,000 and 100,000 people ===
- Pasco (56.3%)

=== Places fewer than 25,000 people ===
- Basin City (76.1%)
- Brewster (59.5%)
- Bridgeport (64.8%)
- George (60.2%)
- Grandview (68.0%)
- Granger (85.5%)
- Mabton (89.0%)
- Mattawa (89.8%)
- Mesa (59.3%)
- Othello (63.8%)
- Quincy (64.7%)
- Royal City (78.2%)
- Sunnyside (73.1%)
- Tieton (54.3%)
- Toppenish (75.7%)
- Wapato (76.2%)
- Warden (71.8%)
