= Rio Rico High School =

Public high school in Santa Cruz County, Arizona

Location
- 590 Camino Lito Galindo; Rio Rico, Arizona 85648; United States
- Coordinates: 31°30′13″N 111°1′16″W

Information
- School type: Public high school
- Motto: Educate Everyone, Every Day
- Established: 1996 (30 years ago)
- School district: Santa Cruz Valley Unified School District
- CEEB code: 030351
- Principal: Dagoberto Lopez
- Teaching staff: 56.53 (FTE)
- Grades: 9–12
- Enrollment: 1,403 (2023–2024)
- Student to teacher ratio: 24.82
- Colors: Red and gold
- Mascot: Hawks
- Website: rrhs.scv35.org

Rio Rico High School (RRHS) is the public high school for Rio Rico, Arizona, United States. It is the only high school in the Santa Cruz Valley Unified School District.

RRHS is home to a growing arts department.
