= Santa Cruz Valley Unified School District =

School district in Santa Cruz County, Arizona

Address
- 1374 W Frontage Rd Rio Rico, Arizona, 85648-6377; United States

District information
- Grades: PK–12
- Schools: 6
- NCES District ID: 0407520

Students and staff
- Students: 3,636 (2019–20)
- Teachers: 177.74 (FTE)
- Student–teacher ratio: 20.46

Other information
- Website: www.scv35.org

The Santa Cruz Valley Unified School District #35 (SCVUSD) is a school district based in Santa Cruz County, Arizona, United States. The students enrolled in the district reside in Rio Rico, Tumacácori, Tubac and Amado.

== Schools ==
=== High school ===
- Rio Rico High School

=== Middle schools ===
- Calabasas K-8
- Coatimundi MS

=== Elementary schools ===
- Mountain View
- San Cayetano
