= Yuma County, Arizona =

County in Arizona, United States

- County
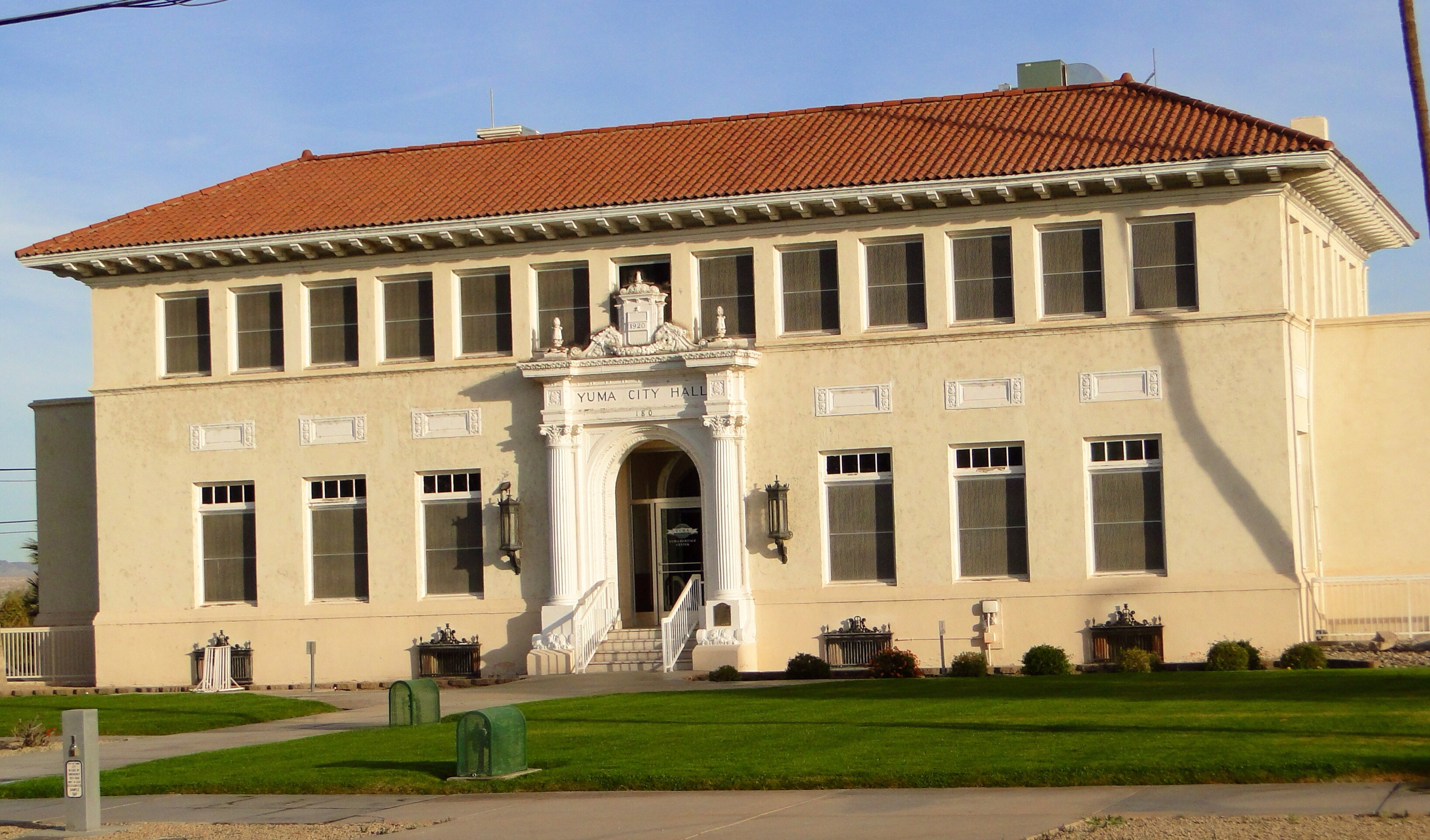
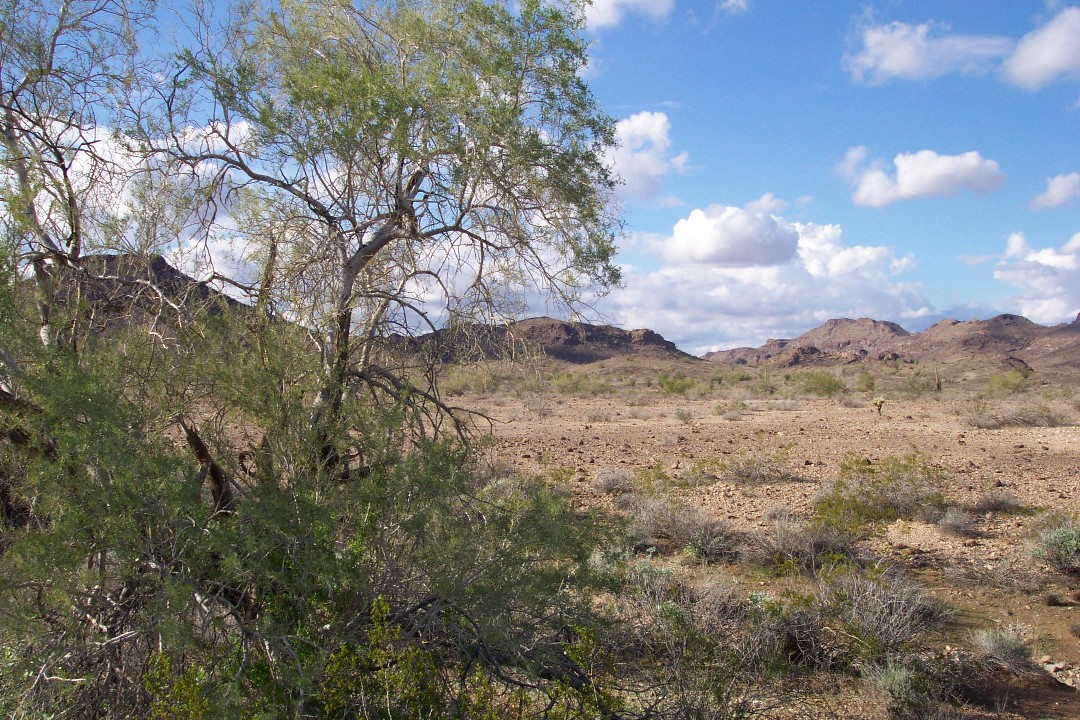
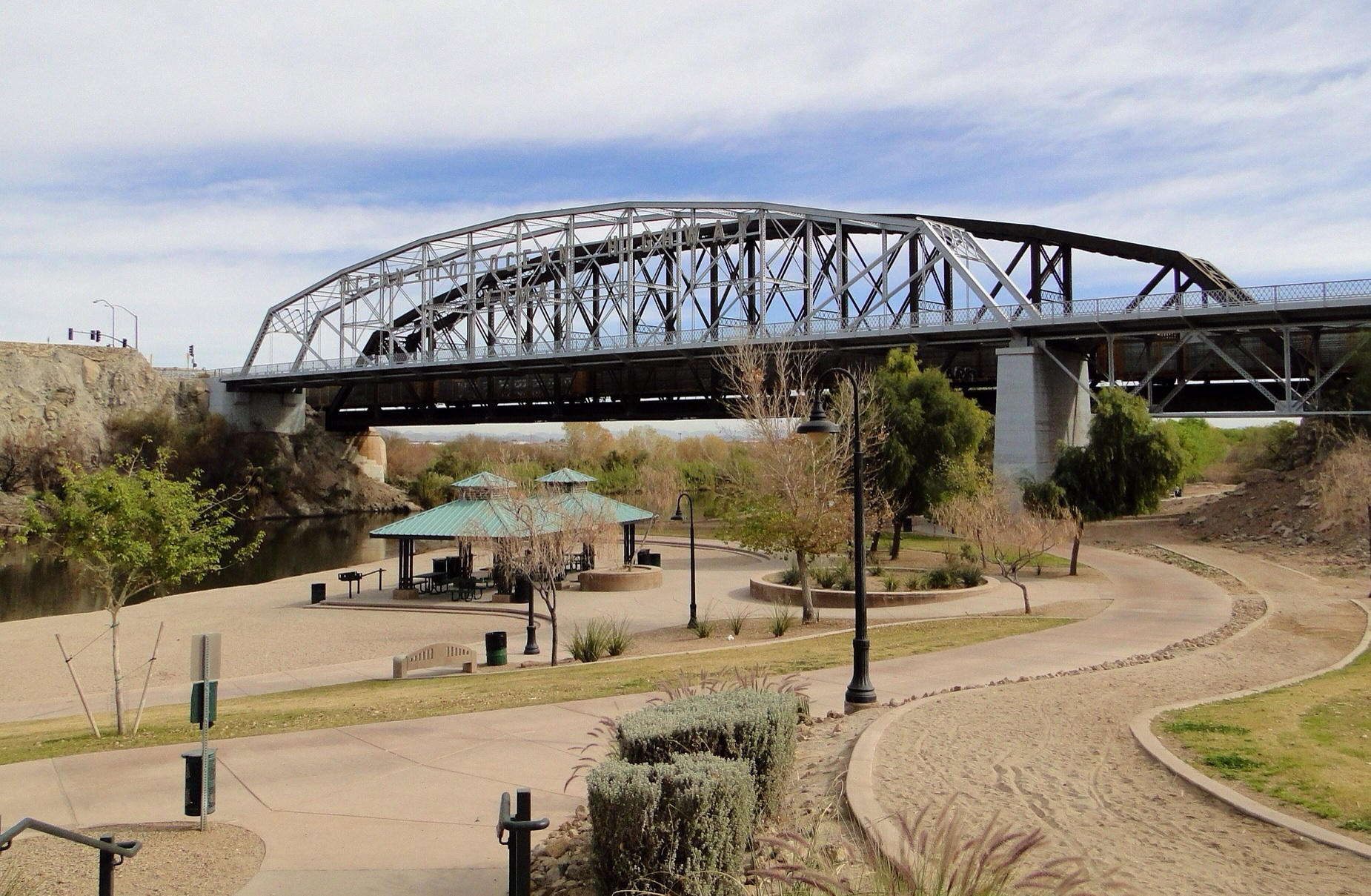
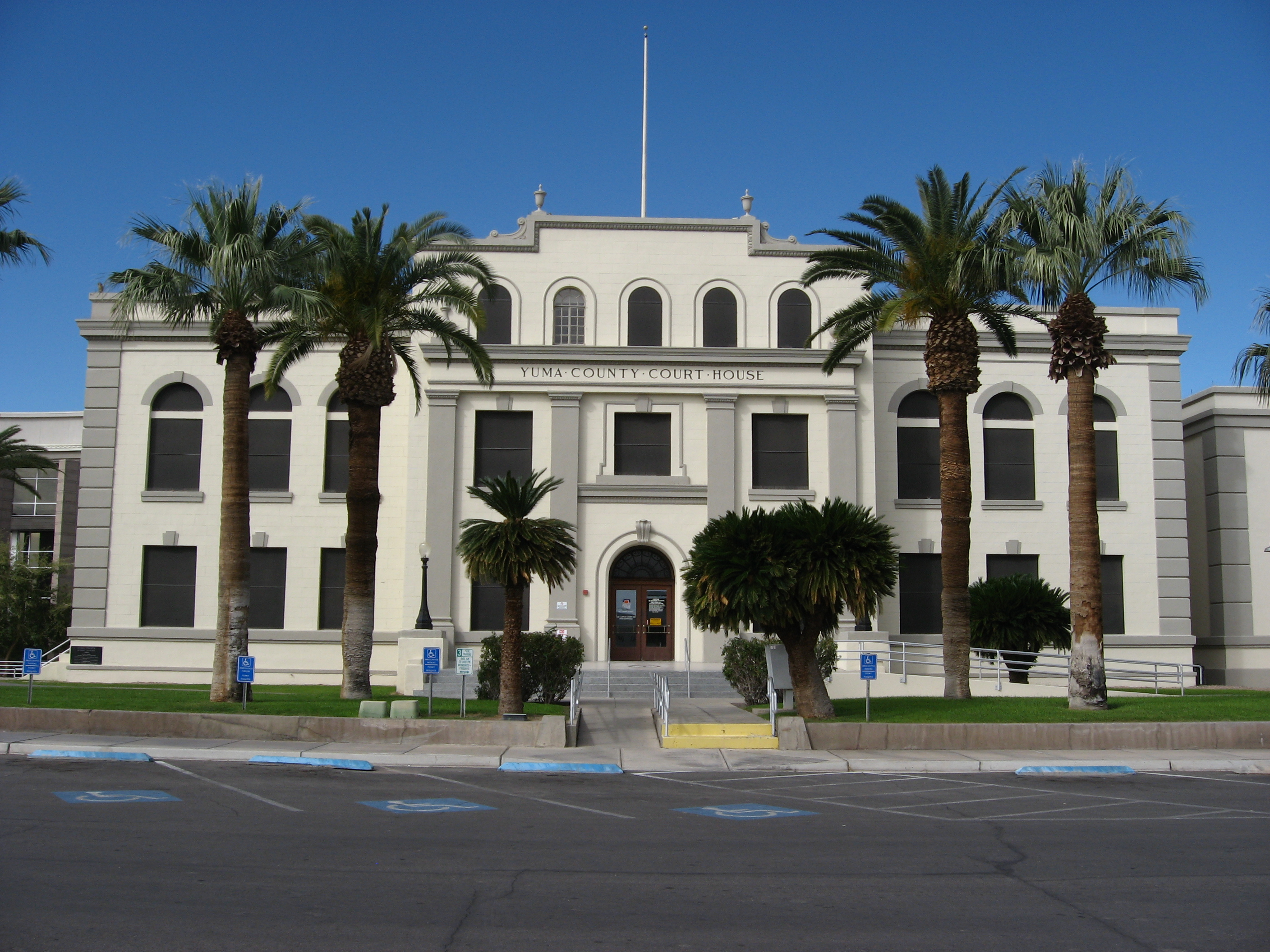
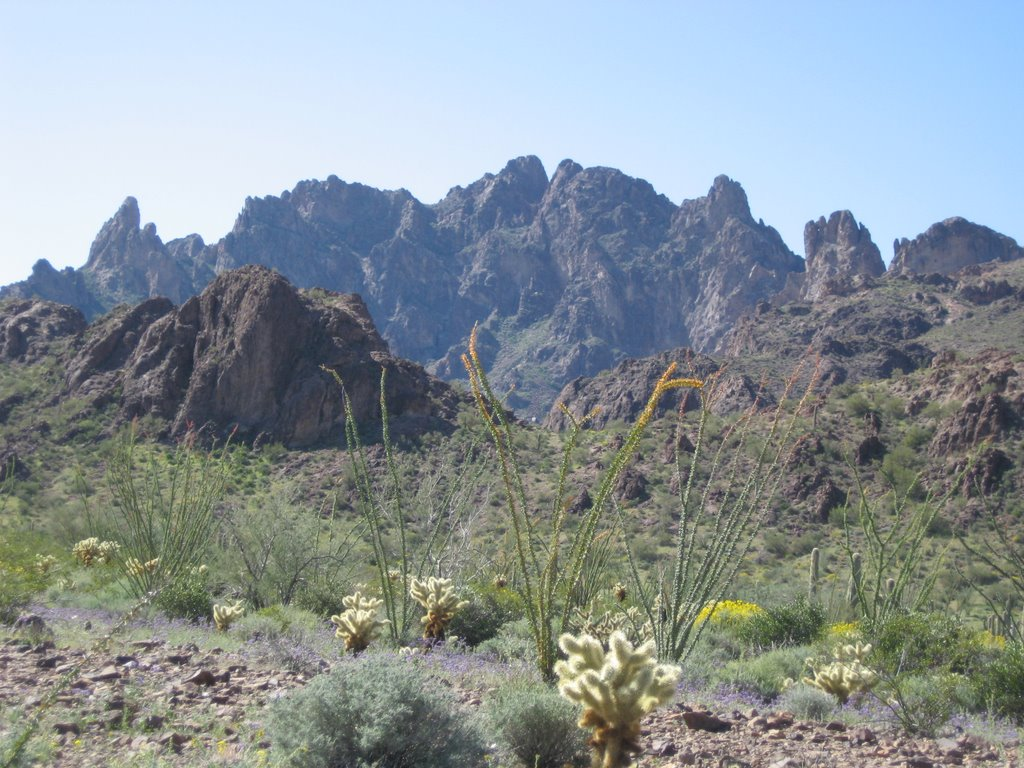
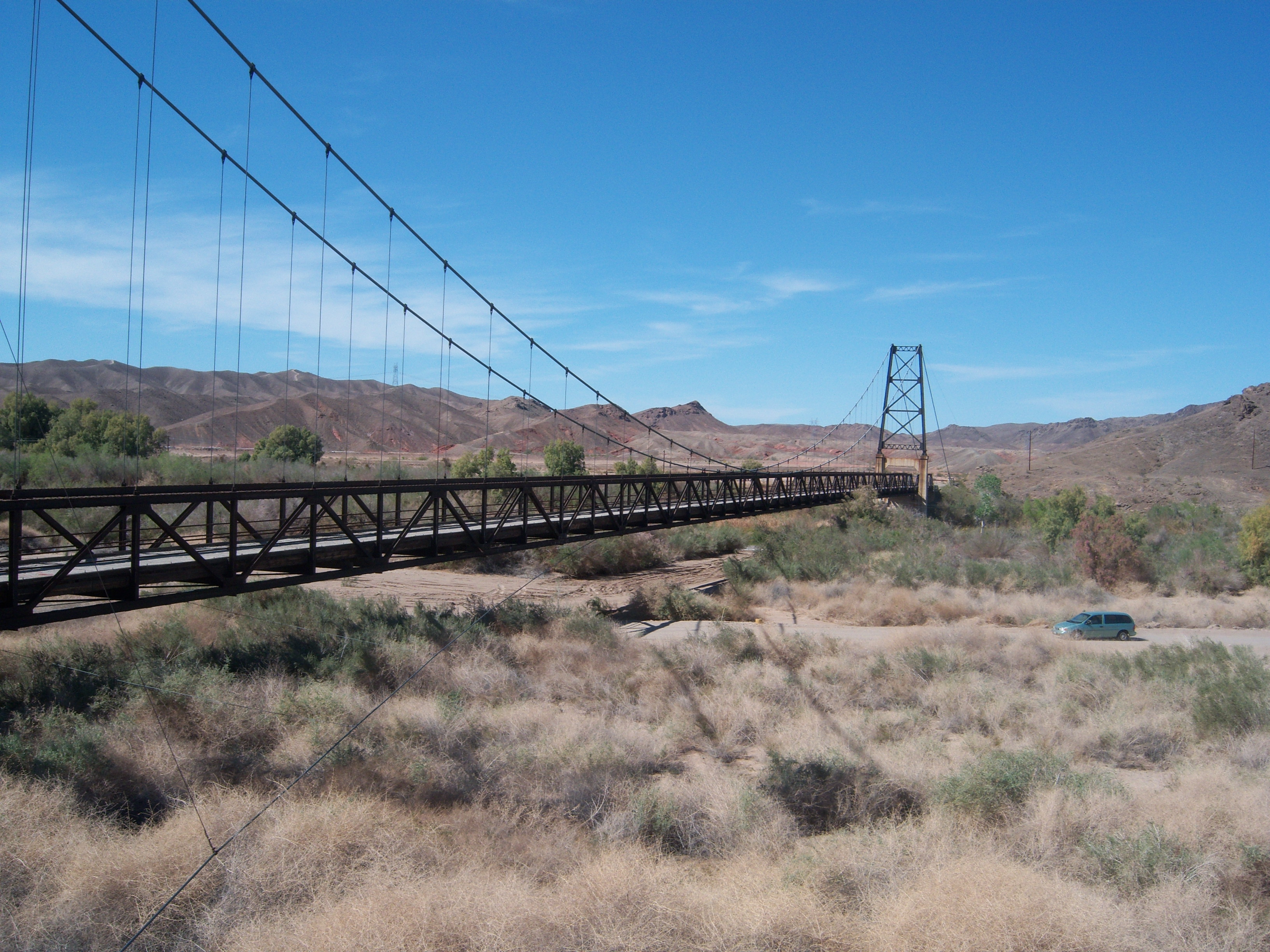
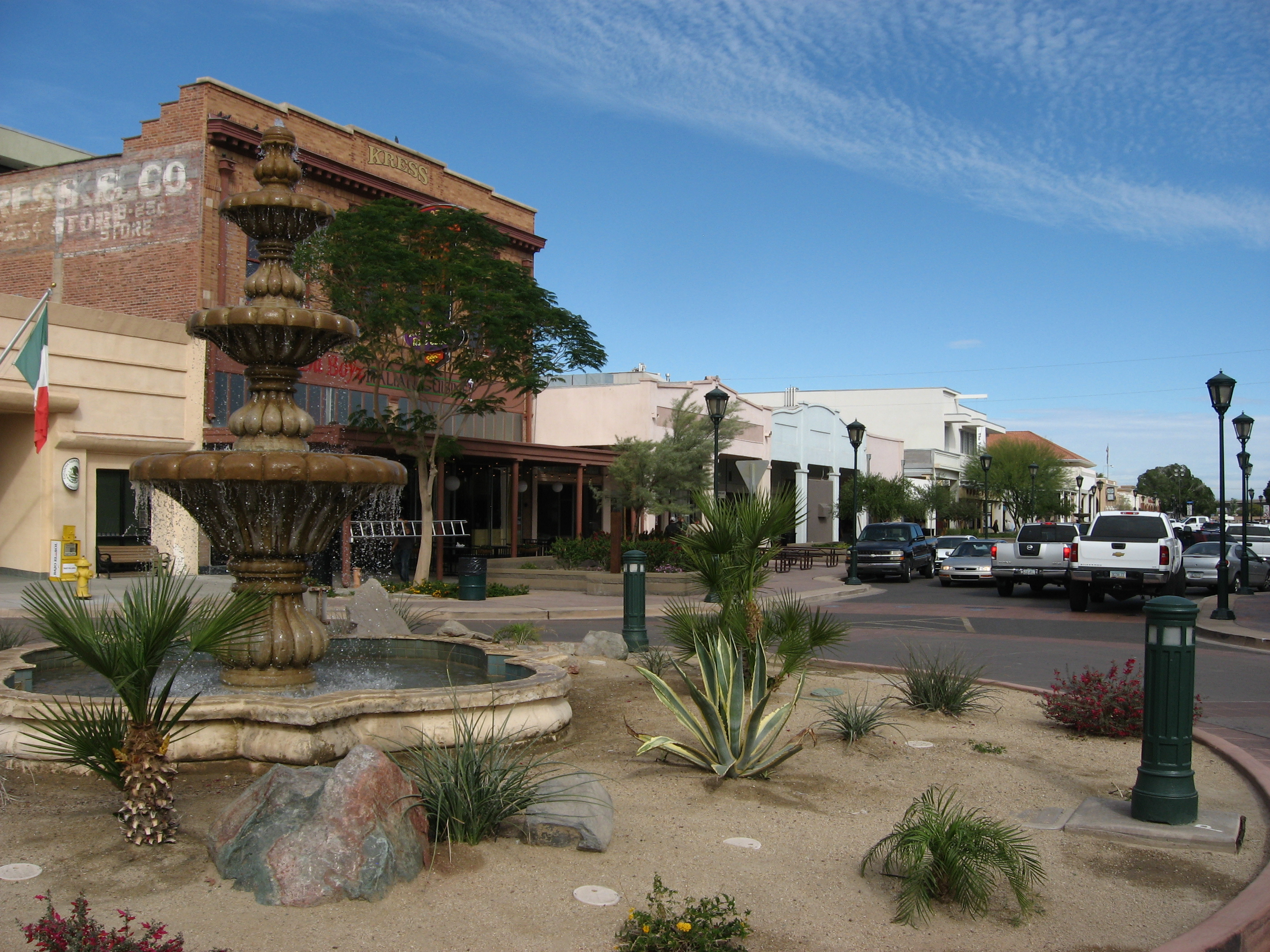
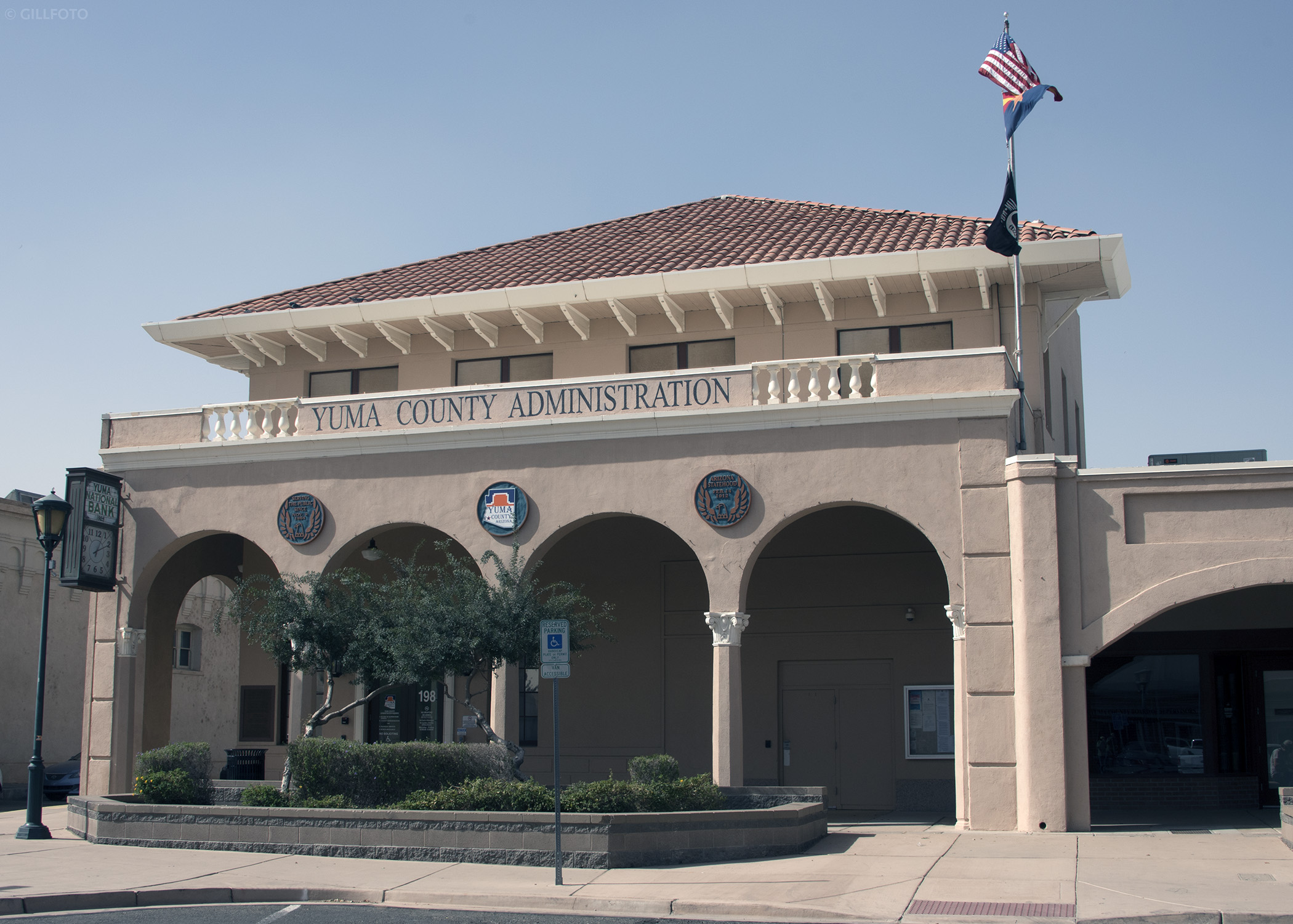
- Clockwise from top: Old Yuma City Hall, Ocean to Ocean Bridge, Kofa Mountains, Downtown Yuma, Yuma County administration building, McPhaul Suspension Bridge, Yuma County Courthouse and the Sonoran Desert near Yuma.

- Flag Seal

- Location within the U.S. state of Arizona
- Coordinates: 32°47′13″N 113°58′58″W
- Country: United States
- State: Arizona
- Founded: November 9, 1864
- Named for: Yuma (Quechan) people
- Seat: Yuma
- Largest city: Yuma

Area
  - Total: 5,519 sq mi (14,290 km^{2})
  - Land: 5,514 sq mi (14,280 km^{2})
  - Water: 5.1 sq mi (13 km^{2}) 0.1%

Population (2020)
  - Total: 203,881
  - Estimate (2025): 224,449 ▲
  - Density: 36.98/sq mi (14.28/km^{2})
- Time zone: UTC−7 (Mountain)
- Congressional districts: 7th, 9th
- Website: www.yumacountyaz.gov

Yuma County is a county in the southwestern corner of the U.S. state of Arizona, one of 15 counties in the state. As of the 2020 census, its population was 203,881. The county seat is Yuma.

Yuma County includes the Yuma, Arizona Metropolitan Statistical Area.

The county borders three states: Sonora, Mexico, to the south, and two other states to the west, across the Colorado River: California of the United States and the Mexican state of Baja California.

Being 63.8% Hispanic in 2020, Yuma is Arizona's largest majority-Hispanic county.

== History ==
Long settled by Native Americans of indigenous cultures for thousands of years, this area was controlled by the Spanish Empire in the colonial era. In the 19th century, it was part of independent Mexico before the Mexican–American War and Gadsden Purchase.

Yuma County was one of four original Arizona counties created by the 1st Arizona Territorial Legislature. The county territory was defined as being west of longitude 113° 20' and south of the Bill Williams River. Its original boundaries remained the same until 1982, when La Paz County was created from its northern half.

The original county seat was the city of La Paz; in 1871 it was moved to Arizona City, later renamed as Yuma in 1873.

== Economy ==
This county is the highest crop producer in the state by dollar value per year. Yuma County tops the list for the categories of vegetables + melons + potatoes + sweet potatoes at $782,293,000, and fruits + tree nuts + berries at $62,499,000. Overall this is the second (to Maricopa) producing county for all agricultural products at $1,143,068,000 per year and for organic production. Almost all of the dates (Phoenix dactylifera) in the state are grown here, about 10 million pounds (4,500 metric tons; 5,000 short tons) worth $35 million per year. This is the second highest citrus producer behind Maricopa, a distant second in grapefruit, limes, and oranges but producing far more lemons. Some olives, clingstone peaches, and plums are grown here. Yuma County produces almost all of the vegetable seed grown in the state. The average farmer age is the lowest in the state, at 56.6 years.

During the winter agricultural season from November to March, some 40,000 Mexican workers cross the border daily to work in United States fields. The area is watered by the Colorado River, and the sector supplies a large part of the US leafy vegetables. The Yuma Lettuce Days festival and agritourism is connected to Yuma agriculture. In 2017 the county produced vegetables worth $782,293,000, ranking first in the state and third in the entire country, from 107,908 acres (43,669 ha). Fruits brought $62,499,000, also first in the state, 56th out of >3000 counties in the country. Jojoba (Simmondsia chinensis) is a valuable native crop here. From here it has also been introduced into cultivation in other countries.

The Sweetpotato Whitefly (Silverleaf Whitefly, Bemisia tabaci) is a common pest here. The county is planted with large extents of several crops which serve as hosts.

Date trees (Phoenix dactylifera) were planted here in the 2010s. In this county, plantations suffer from the Carob Moth (Ectomyelois ceratoniae) and the Banks Grass Mite (Oligonychus pratensis).

Leaders in the county are aware their economy is tied to that of Mexican states on the other side of the border; both have to be considered. "There are automotive plants in Ciudad Juárez, across from El Paso; aerospace plants in Mexicali, southwest of Yuma; and medical devices’ manufacturers in Tijuana, near San Diego. On the American side, there is a mix of retail stores, warehouses and trucking companies..."

Because of Yuma County's location along the U.S.-Mexico border, large numbers of aliens entering the United States illegally pass through Yuma County. From October 2004 to July 2005, some 124,400 undocumented foreign nationals were apprehended in the area, a 46% increase over the previous year. In 2014, however, only 5,902 people were apprehended. The report from the Congressional Research Service stated, "...it is unclear how much of the drop-off is due to increased enforcement and how much is a result of the U.S. economic downturn and other systemic factors".

The Greater Yuma Economic Development Corp anticipates many agricultural jobs in the county will soon transition to robotics.

== Government ==
The Board of Supervisors is the governing body of the county and a number of special districts. The board has members from five districts. The Board adopts ordinances, establishes programs, levies taxes, appropriates funds, appoints certain officials, and zones property and regulates development in the unincorporated area. In addition, members of the Board represent the county on numerous intergovernmental agencies.

In Arizona's first 52 years as a state, Yuma County was a primarily Democratic county, only voting for the Republican candidates four times in presidential elections prior to 1968. From 1968 onward, it has consistently voted for Republican presidential candidates. In 2016, county voters elected more Democrats to the Board than Republicans for the first time since 2004. However, their margins of victory have been reduced in recent years as the county has rapidly grown in population and become majority-Hispanic. Donald Trump only won the county by 560 votes over Hillary Clinton in the presidential election of 2016. However, Trump's margin did improve to over 4,000 votes as he won the county again in 2020 over Joe Biden.

In 2024, Trump won Yuma County by over 20 percentage points against Kamala Harris, the best performance by a Republican since Ronald Reagan in 1984.

United States presidential election results for Yuma County, Arizona
Year	Republican		Democratic		Third party(ies)	
Year	No.	%	No.	%	No.	%
1912	90	8.43%	424	39.74%	553	51.83%
1916	727	32.46%	1,322	59.02%	191	8.53%
1920	1,606	57.71%	1,177	42.29%	0	0.00%
1924	1,280	41.75%	851	27.76%	935	30.50%
1928	2,328	59.43%	1,589	40.57%	0	0.00%
1932	1,162	24.06%	3,463	71.70%	205	4.24%
1936	976	21.22%	3,428	74.54%	195	4.24%
1940	1,870	31.01%	4,138	68.61%	23	0.38%
1944	1,831	34.46%	3,472	65.35%	10	0.19%
1948	2,324	33.37%	4,483	64.37%	157	2.25%
1952	4,761	51.72%	4,444	48.28%	0	0.00%
1956	5,330	47.96%	5,776	51.98%	7	0.06%
1960	5,547	45.45%	6,642	54.42%	15	0.12%
1964	6,548	45.44%	7,857	54.52%	5	0.03%
1968	6,856	46.85%	5,770	39.43%	2,007	13.72%
1972	9,596	63.52%	4,755	31.48%	755	5.00%
1976	9,324	52.15%	7,998	44.73%	558	3.12%
1980	13,393	63.34%	6,014	28.44%	1,738	8.22%
1984	13,848	67.61%	6,458	31.53%	175	0.85%
1988	13,253	58.95%	8,952	39.82%	275	1.22%
1992	11,652	41.55%	10,367	36.97%	6,026	21.49%
1996	13,013	47.03%	12,267	44.33%	2,391	8.64%
2000	15,708	54.82%	12,055	42.07%	889	3.10%
2004	22,184	57.58%	16,032	41.61%	313	0.81%
2008	24,577	56.15%	18,559	42.40%	636	1.45%
2012	23,352	55.50%	18,059	42.92%	662	1.57%
2016	25,165	47.47%	24,605	46.42%	3,240	6.11%
2020	36,534	52.25%	32,210	46.06%	1,182	1.69%
2024	40,745	59.74%	26,823	39.33%	631	0.93%

== Geography ==
According to the United States Census Bureau, the county has an area of 5,519 square miles (14,290 km^{2}), of which 5,514 square miles (14,280 km^{2}) is land and 5.1 square miles (13 km^{2}) (0.1%) is water. The lowest point in the state of Arizona is on the Colorado River in San Luis in Yuma County, where it flows out of Arizona and into Sonora in Mexico.

Yuma County is in the west, and northwestern regions of the north–south Sonoran Desert that extends through Sonora state of Mexico to the border of northern Sinaloa state. West of the county across the Colorado River in southeast California is the Colorado Desert, (a northwestern subregion of the Sonoran Desert). North of the county, with La Paz County the regions merge into the southeastern Mojave Desert. Southwest of Yuma County, is the entirety of Northwest Mexico, at the north shoreline of the Gulf of California, and the outlet of the Colorado River into the Colorado River Delta region, now altered with lack of freshwater inputs. Notable mountains in Yuma County include the Gila Mountains and the Tule Mountains.

=== Adjacent counties and municipalities ===
- La Paz County – north
- Maricopa County – east
- Pima County – southeast
- San Luis Rio Colorado Municipality, Sonora, Mexico – south
- Mexicali Municipality, Baja California, Mexico – southwest
- Imperial County, California – west

=== Major highways ===
- Interstate 8
  - Interstate 8 Business Loop (Yuma)
- Historic U.S. Route 80
- U.S. Route 95
- Arizona State Route 195

=== National protected areas ===
- Cabeza Prieta National Wildlife Refuge (part)
- Imperial National Wildlife Refuge (part)
- Kofa National Wildlife Refuge (part)

=== Climate ===
Climate data for Yuma, Arizona (1991–2020 normals, (Note: Mean monthly maxima and minima (i.e. the highest and lowest temperature readings during an entire month or year) calculated based on data at said location from 1991 to 2020.) sunshine 1981–2010, extremes 1878–present)
Month	Jan	Feb	Mar	Apr	May	Jun	Jul	Aug	Sep	Oct	Nov	Dec	Year
Record high °F (°C)	88 (31)	97 (36)	109 (43)	107 (42)	120 (49)	122 (50)	124 (51)	120 (49)	123 (51)	113 (45)	98 (37)	86 (30)	124 (51)
Mean maximum °F (°C)	79.5 (26.4)	84.1 (28.9)	92.8 (33.8)	100.3 (37.9)	106.2 (41.2)	112.9 (44.9)	115.0 (46.1)	114.4 (45.8)	110.6 (43.7)	102.2 (39.0)	89.5 (31.9)	78.0 (25.6)	116.6 (47.0)
Mean daily maximum °F (°C)	69.8 (21.0)	73.4 (23.0)	80.2 (26.8)	86.4 (30.2)	94.3 (34.6)	103.3 (39.6)	106.7 (41.5)	106.4 (41.3)	101.4 (38.6)	90.2 (32.3)	77.7 (25.4)	67.8 (19.9)	88.1 (31.2)
Daily mean °F (°C)	58.8 (14.9)	61.9 (16.6)	67.6 (19.8)	73.1 (22.8)	80.6 (27.0)	89.1 (31.7)	94.6 (34.8)	94.8 (34.9)	89.5 (31.9)	78.0 (25.6)	66.1 (18.9)	57.3 (14.1)	76.0 (24.4)
Mean daily minimum °F (°C)	47.9 (8.8)	50.4 (10.2)	55.0 (12.8)	60.8 (16.0)	66.9 (19.4)	75.0 (23.9)	82.6 (28.1)	83.2 (28.4)	77.6 (25.3)	65.7 (18.7)	54.4 (12.4)	46.8 (8.2)	63.8 (17.7)
Mean minimum °F (°C)	38.1 (3.4)	40.8 (4.9)	44.7 (7.1)	49.6 (9.8)	56.8 (13.8)	65.1 (18.4)	75.2 (24.0)	75.0 (23.9)	66.9 (19.4)	54.6 (12.6)	44.1 (6.7)	37.2 (2.9)	35.6 (2.0)
Record low °F (°C)	22 (−6)	25 (−4)	31 (−1)	38 (3)	39 (4)	50 (10)	61 (16)	58 (14)	50 (10)	35 (2)	29 (−2)	22 (−6)	22 (−6)
Average precipitation inches (mm)	0.39 (9.9)	0.38 (9.7)	0.39 (9.9)	0.14 (3.6)	0.06 (1.5)	0.01 (0.25)	0.24 (6.1)	0.20 (5.1)	0.68 (17)	0.13 (3.3)	0.23 (5.8)	0.43 (11)	3.28 (83)
Average precipitation days (≥ 0.01 in)	2.6	2.3	1.9	0.8	0.5	0.1	1.2	1.4	1.5	1.0	1.0	2.3	16.6
Mean monthly sunshine hours	268.4	270.8	335.5	365.5	407.4	415.4	392.6	375.6	341.7	319.6	270.1	252.7	4,015.3
Percentage possible sunshine	84	88	90	94	95	97	90	91	92	91	86	81	90
Average ultraviolet index	3	5	7	8	10	10	11	10	9	6	4	3	7
Source 1: NOAA
Source 2: Weather Atlas

== Demographics ==
Historical population
Census	Pop.	Note	%±
1870	1,621		—
1880	3,215		98.3%
1890	2,671		−16.9%
1900	4,145		55.2%
1910	7,733		86.6%
1920	14,904		92.7%
1930	17,816		19.5%
1940	19,326		8.5%
1950	28,006		44.9%
1960	46,235		65.1%
1970	60,827		31.6%
1980	90,554		48.9%
1990	106,895		18.0%
2000	160,026		49.7%
2010	195,751		22.3%
2020	203,881		4.2%
2025 (est.)	224,449	▲	10.1%
U.S. Decennial Census; 1790–1960 1900–1990; 1990–2000 2010–2020

=== Racial and ethnic composition ===
Yuma County, Arizona – Racial and ethnic composition Note: the US Census treats Hispanic/Latino as an ethnic category. This table excludes Latinos from the racial categories and assigns them to a separate category. Hispanics/Latinos may be of any race.
Race / Ethnicity (NH = Non-Hispanic)	2020	2010	2000	1990	1980
White alone (NH)	30% (61,123)	35.3% (69,022)	44.3% (70,956)	54.4% (58,151)	60.7% (54,926)
Black alone (NH)	1.7% (3,484)	1.6% (3,169)	2% (3,136)	2.6% (2,776)	2.6% (2,310)
American Indian alone (NH)	0.9% (1,888)	1% (1,957)	1.1% (1,819)	1.1% (1,178)	3.1% (2,774)
Asian alone (NH)	1.1% (2,321)	1% (2,041)	0.9% (1,362)	1.1% (1,188)	0.9% (826)
Pacific Islander alone (NH)	0.1% (215)	0.1% (204)	0.1% (132)		
Other race alone (NH)	0.3% (622)	0.1% (216)	0.1% (131)	0.2% (214)	0.2% (188)
Multiracial (NH)	2.1% (4,225)	1.1% (2,230)	1.1% (1,718)	—	—
Hispanic/Latino (any race)	63.8% (130,003)	59.7% (116,912)	50.5% (80,772)	40.6% (43,388)	32.6% (29,530)

=== American Community Survey 2025 data ===
The United States Census Bureau estimated that in 2025, Yuma County’s population was 224.449. It was also estimated that the county's population was 27,30% Non-Hispanic White, 66,77% Hispanic or Latino, 1,85% Non-Hispanic Black, 1,26% Asian, 0,94% Native American, 0,12% Pacific Islander, and 1,75% Multiracial.

Total	Population	Percentage
Non-Hispanic White	61.281	27,30%
Hispanic or Latino	149.861	66,77%
Non-Hispanic Black	4.162	1,85%
Asian	2.820	1,26%
Native American	2.109	0,94%
Pacific Islander	280	0,12%
Non-Hispanic Multiracial	3.936	1,75%

=== 2020 census ===
As of the 2020 census, the county had a population of 203,881. Of the residents, 24.9% were under the age of 18 and 18.8% were 65 years of age or older; the median age was 37.1 years. For every 100 females there were 101.1 males, and for every 100 females age 18 and over there were 100.0 males. 84.9% of residents lived in urban areas and 15.1% lived in rural areas.

The racial makeup of the county was 44.3% White, 2.0% Black or African American, 1.7% American Indian and Alaska Native, 1.3% Asian, 0.1% Native Hawaiian and Pacific Islander, 25.1% from some other race, and 25.4% from two or more races. Hispanic or Latino residents of any race comprised 63.8% of the population.

Detailed counts and percentages for each race and ethnicity may be found in the table below.

There were 69,589 households in the county, of which 36.4% had children under the age of 18 living with them and 24.9% had a female householder with no spouse or partner present. About 22.3% of all households were made up of individuals and 11.8% had someone living alone who was 65 years of age or older.

There were 92,048 housing units, of which 24.4% were vacant. Among occupied housing units, 70.5% were owner-occupied and 29.5% were renter-occupied. The homeowner vacancy rate was 1.7% and the rental vacancy rate was 10.5%.

=== 2010 census ===
As of the 2010 census, there were 195,751 people, 64,767 households, and 48,976 families residing in the county. The population density was 35.5 inhabitants per square mile (13.7 inhabitants/km^{2}). There were 87,850 housing units at an average density of 15.9 units per square mile (6.1 units/km^{2}). The racial makeup of the county was 70.4% white, 2.0% black or African American, 1.6% American Indian, 1.2% Asian, 0.2% Pacific islander, 20.8% from other races, and 3.8% from two or more races. Those of Hispanic or Latino origin made up 59.7% of the population. In terms of ancestry, 10.6% were German, 7.4% were English, 6.9% were Irish, and 3.2% were American.

Of the 64,767 households, 41.1% had children under the age of 18 living with them, 56.8% were married couples living together, 13.8% had a female householder with no husband present, 24.4% were non-families, and 19.6% of all households were made up of individuals. The average household size was 2.93 and the average family size was 3.39. The median age was 33.8 years.

The median income for a household in the county was $40,340 and the median income for a family was $42,718. Males had a median income of $36,345 versus $27,262 for females. The per capita income for the county was $18,418. About 17.6% of families and 20.9% of the population were below the poverty line, including 30.7% of those under age 18 and 12.7% of those age 65 or over.

=== 2000 census ===
As of the census of 2000, there were 160,026 people, 53,848 households, and 41,678 families residing in the county. The population density was 29 people per square mile (11 people/km^{2}). There were 74,140 housing units at an average density of 13 units per square mile (5.0 units/km^{2}). The county's racial makeup was 68.3% White, 2.2% Black or African American, 1.6% Native American, 0.9% Asian, 0.1% Pacific Islander, 23.6% from other races, and 3.2% from two or more races. 50.5% of the population were Hispanic or Latino of any race. 43.7% reported speaking Spanish at home Language Map Data Center.

There were 53,848 households, out of which 36.9% had children under the age of 18 living with them, 62.3% were married couples living together, 11.2% had a female householder with no husband present, and 22.6% were non-families. 18.5% of all households were made up of individuals, and 8.9% had someone living alone who was 65 years of age or older. The average household size was 2.86 and the average family size was 3.27.

In the county, the population was spread out, with 28.9% under the age of 18, 10.0% from 18 to 24, 25.6% from 25 to 44, 18.9% from 45 to 64, and 16.5% who were 65 years of age or older. The median age was 34 years. For every 100 females there were 102.0 males. For every 100 females age 18 and over, there were 101.1 males.

The median income for a household in the county was $32,182, and the median income for a family was $34,659. Males had a median income of $27,390 versus $22,276 for females. The per capita income for the county was $14,802. About 15.5% of families and 19.2% of the population were below the poverty line, including 27.9% of those under age 18 and 8.7% of those age 65 or over.

== Communities ==
Map of Yuma County showing incorporated and unincorporated areas as well as Indian reservations in the county.

=== Cities ===
- San Luis
- Somerton
- Yuma (county seat)

=== Town ===
- Wellton

=== Census-designated places ===
- Avenue B and C
- Aztec
- Buckshot
- Dateland
- Donovan Estates
- Drysdale
- El Prado Estates
- Fortuna Foothills
- Gadsden
- Martinez Lake
- Orange Grove Mobile Manor
- Padre Ranchitos
- Rancho Mesa Verde
- Tacna
- Wall Lane
- Wellton Hills
- Yuma Proving Ground

=== Other unincorporated communities ===
- Mohawk
- Roll

=== Ghost towns ===
- Arizona City
- Castle Dome
- Castle Dome Landing
- Colorado City
- Dome
- Filibusters Camp
- Fortuna
- Gila City
- Hyder
- Kofa
- La Laguna
- Mission Camp
- Owl
- Pedrick's
- Polaris

=== Indian reservations ===
- Fort Yuma Indian Reservation
- Cocopah Indian Reservation

=== County population ranking ===
The population ranking of the following table is based on the 2010 census of Yuma County.

† county seat

Rank	City/Town/etc.	Population (2010 Census)	Municipal type	Incorporated
1	† Yuma	93,064	City	1914
2	Fortuna Foothills	26,265	CDP	
3	San Luis	25,505	City	1979
4	Somerton	14,287	City	1918
5	Avenue B and C	4,176	CDP	
6	Wellton	2,882	Town	1970
7	Donovan Estates	1,508	CDP	
8	Martinez Lake	798	CDP	
9	Gadsden	678	CDP	
10	Rancho Mesa Verde	625	CDP	
11	Tacna	602	CDP	
12	Orange Grove Mobile Manor	594	CDP	
13	El Prado Estates	504	CDP	
14	Dateland	416	CDP	
15	Wall Lane	415	CDP	
16	Drysdale	272	CDP	
17	Wellton Hills	258	CDP	
18	Padre Ranchitos	171	CDP	
19	Buckshot	153	CDP	
20	Aztec	47	CDP	
21	Yuma Proving Ground	0	CDP	

== Education ==
There are two high school districts operating in the county: Antelope Union High School District and Yuma Union High School District. Elementary school districts include:

- Crane Elementary School District
- Gadsden Elementary School District
- Hyder Elementary School District
- Mohawk Valley Elementary School District
- Somerton Elementary School District
- Wellton Elementary School District
- Yuma Elementary School District

== See also ==
- National Register of Historic Places listings in Yuma County, Arizona
