= Oro Blanco, Arizona =

Former populated place in Santa Cruz County, Arizona

- Populated place
- Location within the state of Arizona Oro Blanco (the United States)
- Coordinates: 31°29′45″N 111°16′47″W
- Country: United States
- State: Arizona
- County: Santa Cruz
- Elevation: 3,963 ft (1,208 m)
- Time zone: UTC-7 (Mountain (MST))
  - Summer (DST): UTC-7 (MST)
- Area code: 520
- FIPS code: 04-51565
- GNIS feature ID: 36757

Oro Blanco is a populated place situated in Santa Cruz County, Arizona, United States.

== History ==
Oro Blanco was a mining community. Its population was 96 in 1902. Once a stage stop, the ghost town has some buildings and a small cemetery.
