= Crane Elementary School District (Arizona) =

School district in Arizona, United States

Address
- 4250 West 16th Street Yuma, Arizona, 85364; United States

District information
- Type: Public
- Grades: PreK–8
- NCES District ID: 0402400

Students and staff
- Students: 5,991
- Teachers: 278.1
- Staff: 347.38
- Student–teacher ratio: 21.54

Other information
- Website: www.craneschools.org

Crane School District 13 is a school district in Yuma County, Arizona. It includes the western portion of Yuma as well as the outlying communities of Avenue B and C, Donovan Estates, Drysdale, Padre Ranchitos, and Wall Lane. 16th Street Military Housing of Marine Corps Air Station Yuma is assigned to schools in Crane ESD.

It was named after George W. Crane, a local pioneer.
