= Lakewood Gardens, Florida =

- Former census-designated place
- Location within Florida
- Coordinates: 26°37′18″N 80°06′09″W
- Country: United States
- State: Florida
- County: Palm Beach

Area
  - Total: 0.190 sq mi (0.49 km^{2})
  - Land: 0.190 sq mi (0.49 km^{2})
  - Water: 0 sq mi (0 km^{2})
- Elevation: 16 ft (4.9 m)

Population (2010)
  - Total: 1,273
  - Density: 6,700/sq mi (2,590/km^{2})
- Time zone: UTC-5 (Eastern (EST))
  - Summer (DST): UTC-4 (EDT)
- Area codes: 561, 728
- GNIS feature ID: 2628524

Lakewood Gardens was a former census-designated place in Palm Beach County, Florida, United States. Its population was 1,273 as of the 2010 census.

Lakewood Gardens first appeared as a census designated place in the 2010 U.S. census formed from part of deleted Lake Worth Corridor CDP. In 2011, the area was annexed by the village of Palm Springs and is now one of its neighborhoods.
