= Santa Cruz County, Arizona =

County in Arizona, United States

- County
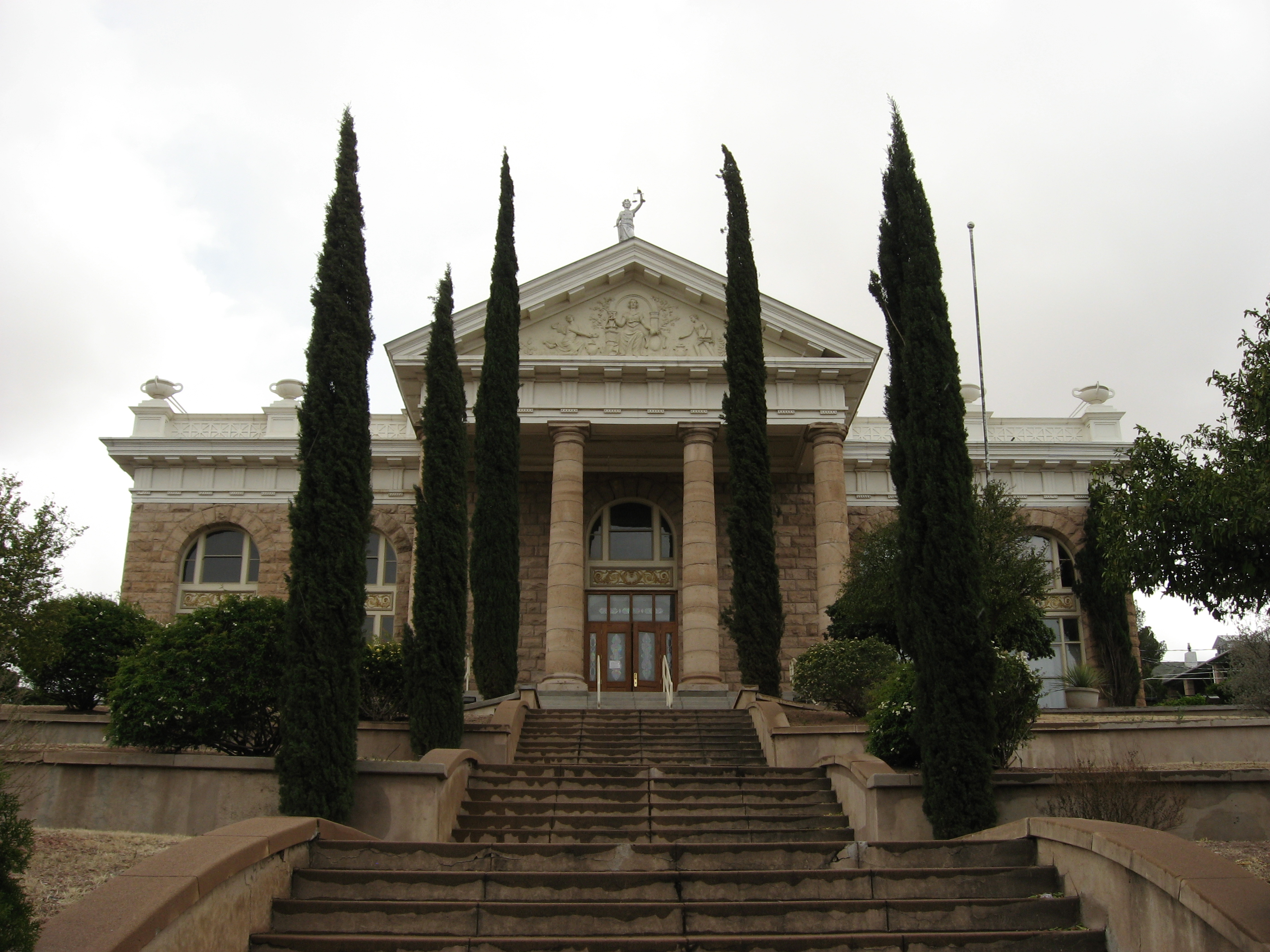
- Santa Cruz County Courthouse

- Seal Logo

- Location within the U.S. state of Arizona
- Coordinates: 31°32′00″N 110°50′00″W
- Country: United States
- State: Arizona
- Founded: March 15, 1899
- Named for: Santa Cruz River
- Seat: Nogales
- Largest city: Rio Rico

Area
  - Total: 1,238 sq mi (3,210 km^{2})
  - Land: 1,237 sq mi (3,200 km^{2})
  - Water: 1.2 sq mi (3.1 km^{2}) 0.1%

Population (2020)
  - Total: 47,669
  - Estimate (2025): 50,020 ▲
  - Density: 38.54/sq mi (14.88/km^{2})
- Time zone: UTC−7 (Mountain)
- Congressional district: 7th
- Website: www.santacruzcountyaz.gov

Santa Cruz is a county in southern Arizona, United States. As of the 2020 census, the population was 47,669. The county seat is Nogales. The county was established in 1899. It borders Pima County to the north and west, Cochise County to the east, and the Mexican state of Sonora to the south.

Santa Cruz County includes the Nogales, Arizona Micropolitan Statistical Area, which is also included in the Tucson-Nogales, Arizona Combined Statistical Area.

== History ==
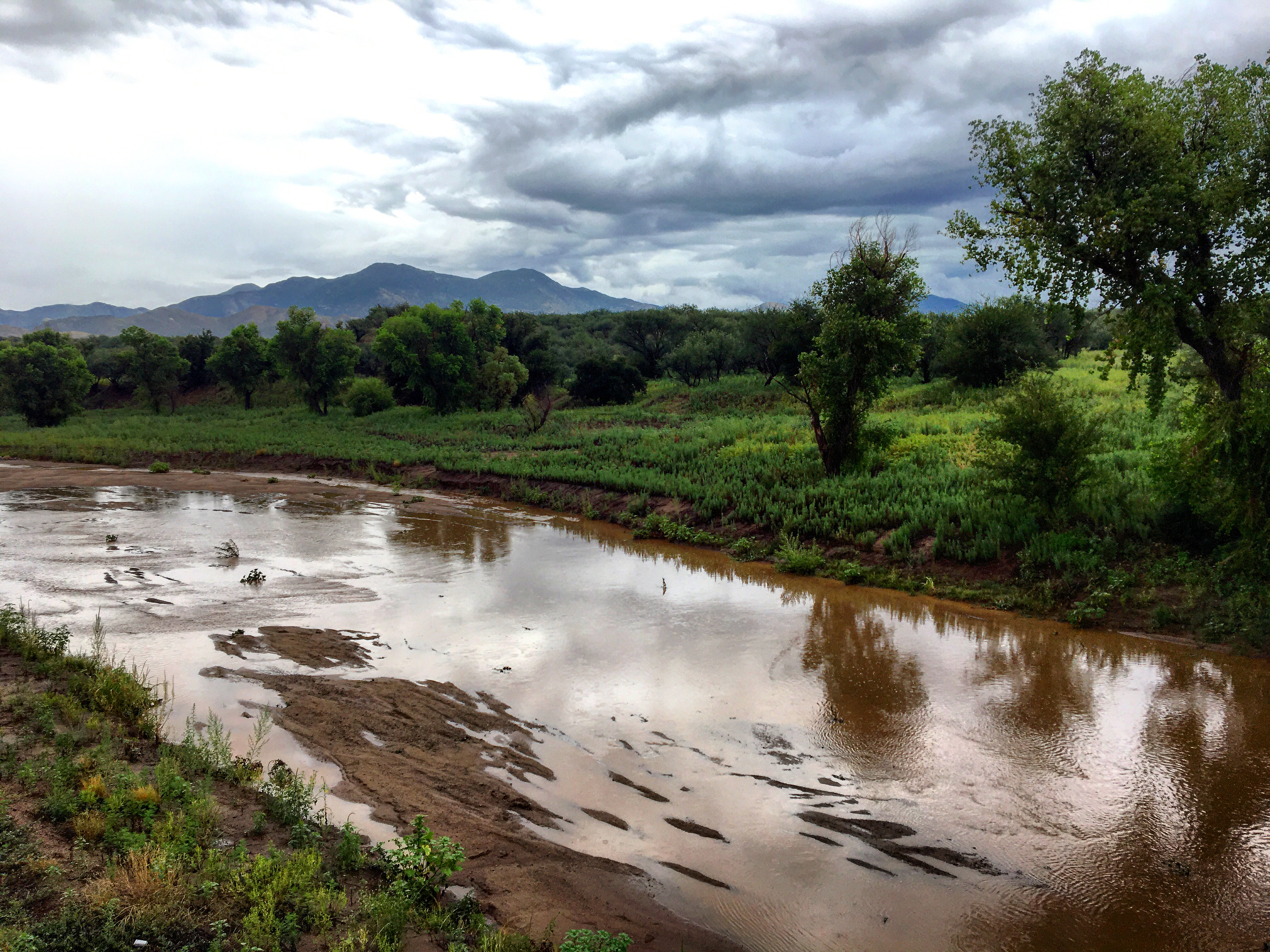
The Santa Cruz River flowing northwards near Kino Springs shortly after re-entering the U.S. from Mexico.

Santa Cruz County, formed on March 15, 1899, out of what was then Pima County, is named after the Santa Cruz River. The river originates in the Canelo Hills in the eastern portion of the county, crosses south into Mexico near the community of Santa Cruz, Sonora, and then bends northwards returning into the United States (and Santa Cruz County) east of Nogales.

Father Eusebio Kino, an Italian explorer and missionary in the service of the Spanish Empire, named the Santa Cruz River–"holy cross" in Spanish–in the 1690s. In addition, Kino founded several missions to evangelize the different O'odham peoples living along the banks of the Santa Cruz River, including Missions San Cayetano del Tumacácori (1691) and San Gabriel de Guevavi (1691), as well as Los Reyes de Sonoita (1692) near Sonoita Creek. Along the river, but outside the boundaries of Santa Cruz County, Kino also founded Mission San Xavier del Bac (1692) near Tucson, Arizona, and Mission Santa Maria del Pilar (1693) in what is now Santa Cruz, Mexico. Kino's San Cayetano and San Gabriel missions were destroyed in the O'odham peoples' 1751 Pima Revolt and rebuilt as Missions Los Santos Ángeles de Guevavi (1751), San José de Tumacácori (1753), and San Cayetano de Calabazas (1756). The ruins of all three of these later missions are now protected by Tumacácori National Historical Park. Disease, warfare, overwork, and changes in land ownership during Spanish colonization led to the demographic decline of the O'odham peoples of Santa Cruz County.

== Geography ==
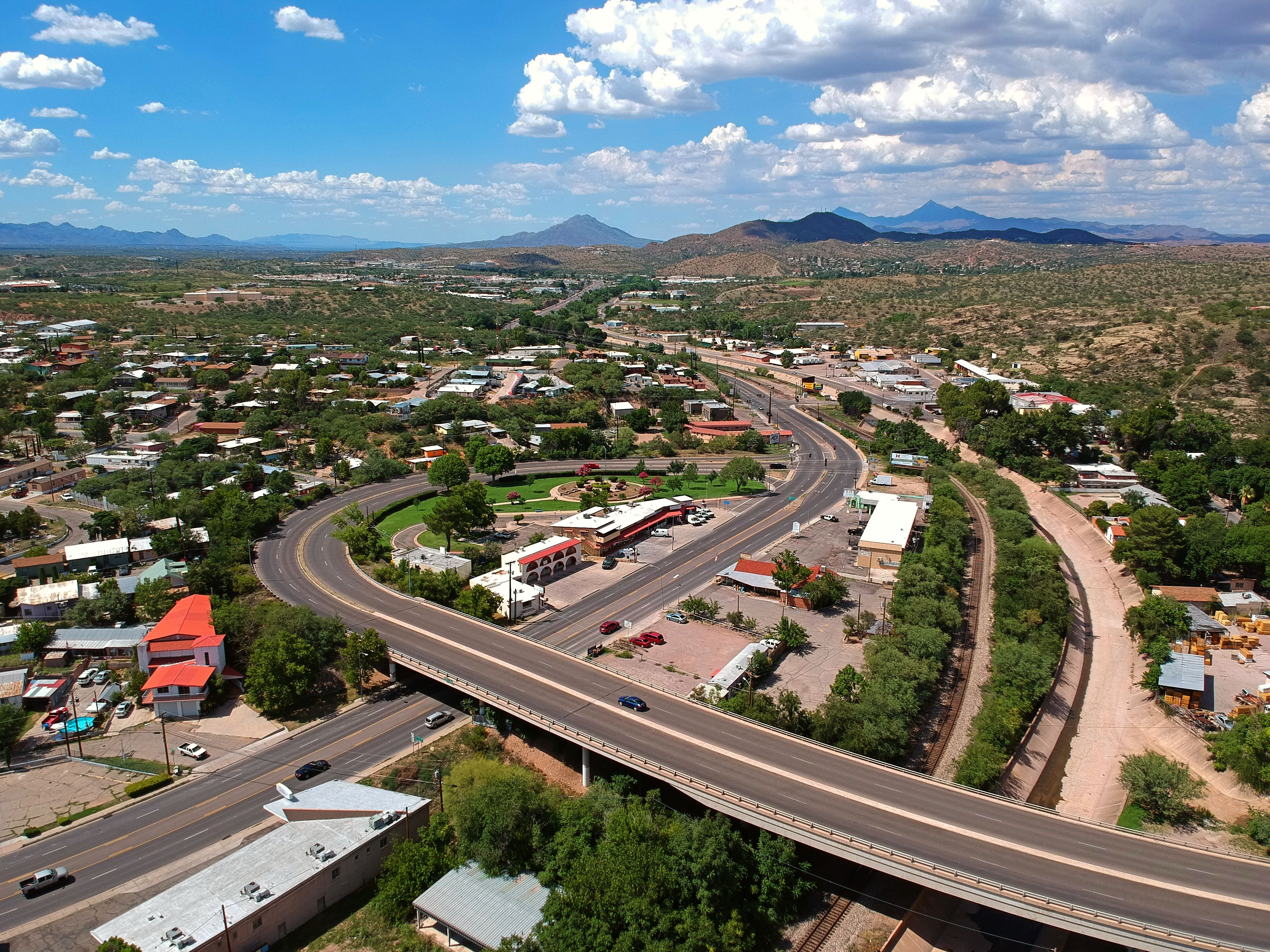
The junction of Arizona State Route 82 (Patagonia Highway) and Business-Loop 19 (Grand Avenue) in Nogales. The SR 82 overpass crosses over Grand Avenue, the Union Pacific Railroad, and the Nogales Wash.

According to the United States Census Bureau, the county has a total area of 1,238 square miles (3,210 km^{2}), of which 1,237 square miles (3,200 km^{2}) is land and 1.2 square miles (3.1 km^{2}) (0.1%) is water. It is the smallest county by area in Arizona.

=== Adjacent counties and municipalities ===
- Pima County–west, north
- Cochise County–east
- Nogales, Sonora, Mexico–south
- Santa Cruz, Sonora, Mexico–south
- Sáric, Sonora, Mexico–south

=== Major highways ===
- Interstate 19
  - Interstate 19 Business Loop (Nogales)
- State Route 82
- State Route 83
- State Route 189
- State Route 389

=== National protected areas ===
- Coronado National Forest (part)
- Las Cienegas National Conservation Area (part)
- Tumacácori National Historical Park

=== Border crossings ===
There are three crossings of the U.S.-Mexico border in Nogales: the Dennis DeConcini Port of Entry (for vehicular and pedestrian traffic); the Nogales-Mariposa Port of Entry (in the western part of the city, for vehicular and pedestrian traffic); and the Morley Gate Port of Entry (for pedestrians only). Lochiel, a former mining and ranching border town, formerly had a border crossing, but the U.S. government shut the port of entry down in 1983.

== Demographics ==
Historical population
Census	Pop.	Note	%±
1900	4,545		—
1910	6,766		48.9%
1920	12,689		87.5%
1930	9,684		−23.7%
1940	9,482		−2.1%
1950	9,417		−0.7%
1960	10,808		14.8%
1970	13,966		29.2%
1980	20,459		46.5%
1990	29,676		45.1%
2000	38,381		29.3%
2010	47,420		23.6%
2020	47,669		0.5%
2025 (est.)	50,020	▲	4.9%
U.S. Decennial Census; 1790–1960 1900–1990; 1990–2000 2010–2020

=== Racial and ethnic composition ===
Santa Cruz County, Arizona – Racial and ethnic composition Note: the US Census treats Hispanic/Latino as an ethnic category. This table excludes Latinos from the racial categories and assigns them to a separate category. Hispanics/Latinos may be of any race.
Race / Ethnicity (NH = Non-Hispanic)	2020	2010	2000	1990	1980
White alone (NH)	14.9% (7,119)	16% (7,564)	17.8% (6,835)	20.8% (6,168)	24.9% (5,087)
Black alone (NH)	0.2% (114)	0.2% (89)	0.2% (75)	0.2% (56)	0.3% (54)
American Indian alone (NH)	0.2% (78)	0.2% (115)	0.3% (95)	0.1% (29)	0% (8)
Asian alone (NH)	0.6% (271)	0.5% (235)	0.5% (189)	0.4% (131)	0.2% (39)
Pacific Islander alone (NH)	0% (13)	0% (7)	0% (17)		
Other race alone (NH)	0.3% (150)	0% (19)	0.1% (28)	0.2% (71)	0.2% (42)
Multiracial (NH)	0.6% (292)	0.3% (118)	0.4% (137)	—	—
Hispanic/Latino (any race)	83.1% (39,632)	82.8% (39,273)	80.8% (31,005)	78.2% (23,221)	74.4% (15,229)

=== American Community Survey 2025 data ===
The United States Census Bureau estimated that in 2025, Santa Cruz County’s population was 50.020. It was also estimated that the county's population was 15,66% Non-Hispanic White, 81,85% Hispanic or Latino, 0,50% Non-Hispanic Black, 0,80% Asian, 0,28% Native American, 0,05% Pacific Islander, and 0,87% Multiracial.

Total	Population	Percentage
Non-Hispanic White	7,831	15.66%
Hispanic or Latino	40,940	81.85%
Non-Hispanic Black	251	0.50%
Asian	402	0.80%
Native American	139	0.28%
Pacific Islander	24	0.05%
Non-Hispanic Multiracial	433	0.87%

=== 2020 census ===
As of the 2020 census, the county had a population of 47,669. Of the residents, 26.1% were under the age of 18 and 20.0% were 65 years of age or older; the median age was 40.2 years. For every 100 females there were 89.8 males, and for every 100 females age 18 and over there were 85.1 males. 40.2% of residents lived in urban areas and 59.8% lived in rural areas.

The racial makeup of the county was 33.4% White, 0.4% Black or African American, 1.0% American Indian and Alaska Native, 0.6% Asian, 0.0% Native Hawaiian and Pacific Islander, 28.9% from some other race, and 35.7% from two or more races. Hispanic or Latino residents of any race comprised 83.1% of the population.

There were 16,670 households in the county, of which 37.8% had children under the age of 18 living with them and 29.0% had a female householder with no spouse or partner present. About 21.5% of all households were made up of individuals and 11.5% had someone living alone who was 65 years of age or older.

There were 18,729 housing units, of which 11.0% were vacant. Among occupied housing units, 67.4% were owner-occupied and 32.6% were renter-occupied. The homeowner vacancy rate was 1.9% and the rental vacancy rate was 7.4%.

=== 2010 census ===
As of the census of 2010, there were 47,420 people, 15,437 households, and 11,992 families living in the county. The population density was 38.3 inhabitants per square mile (14.8 inhabitants/km^{2}). There were 18,010 housing units at an average density of 14.6 units per square mile (5.6 units/km^{2}). The racial makeup of the county was 73.5% white, 0.7% American Indian, 0.5% Asian, 0.4% black or African American, 22.9% from other races, and 2.0% from two or more races. Those of Hispanic or Latino origin made up 82.8% of the population.

The largest ancestry groups were:

- 78.1% Mexican
- 4.3% German
- 3.4% Irish
- 3.1% English
- 2.3% American
- 1.8% Italian

Of the 15,437 households, 45.6% had children under the age of 18 living with them, 55.7% were married couples living together, 17.1% had a female householder with no husband present, 22.3% were non-families, and 19.0% of all households were made up of individuals. The average household size was 3.05 and the average family size was 3.51. The median age was 35.6 years.

The median income for a household in the county was $36,519 and the median income for a family was $40,933. Males had a median income of $30,666 versus $25,135 for females. The per capita income for the county was $16,209. About 20.6% of families and 25.2% of the population were below the poverty line, including 36.8% of those under age 18 and 15.7% of those age 65 or over.

=== 2000 census ===
As of the census of 2000, there were 38,381 people, 11,809 households, and 9,506 families living in the county. The population density was 31 people per square mile (12 people/km^{2}). There were 13,036 housing units at an average density of 10 units per square mile (3.9 units/km^{2}). The racial makeup of the county was 76.0% White, 0.4% Black or African American, 0.7% Native American, 0.5% Asian, 0.1% Pacific Islander, 19.7% from other races, and 2.6% from two or more races. 80.8% of the population were Hispanic or Latino of any race. 79.7% of the population reported speaking Spanish at home, while 19.5% speak English.

There were 11,809 households, of which 45.6% had children under the age of 18 living with them, 61.3% were married couples living together, 15.4% had a female householder with no husband present, and 19.5% were non-families. 16.5% of all households were made up of individuals, and 7.1% had someone living alone who was 65 years of age or older. The average household size was 3.23 and the average family size was 3.66.

In the county, the population was spread out, with 33.6% under the age of 18, 8.2% from 18 to 24, 26.6% from 25 to 44, 20.8% from 45 to 64, and 10.7% who were 65 years of age or older. The median age was 32 years. For every 100 females there were 91.7 males. For every 100 females age 18 and over, there were 86.2 males.

The median income for a household in the county was $29,710, and the median income for a family was $32,057. Males had a median income of $27,972 versus $21,107 for females. The per capita income for the county was $13,278. About 21.40% of families and 24.50% of the population were below the poverty line, including 29.% of those under age 18 and 23.2% of those age 65 or over.

== Communities ==
Map of the incorporated areas in Santa Cruz County.

=== City ===
- Nogales (county seat)

=== Town ===
- Patagonia

=== Census designated places ===
- Amado
- Beyerville
- Elgin
- Kino Springs
- Rio Rico
- Sonoita
- Tubac
- Tumacacori-Carmen

=== Unincorporated communities ===
- Harshaw
- Oro Blanco
- Carmen
- Lochiel
- Trench Camp
- Casa Piedra
- Madera Canyon
- Washington Camp

==== Ghost towns ====
- Alto
- Canelo
- Calabasas
- Duquesne
- Fort Buchanan
- Harshaw
- Lochiel
- Oro Blanco
- Ruby

== Education ==
School districts include:

K-12:

- Nogales Unified School District
- Santa Cruz Valley Unified School District

Secondary:

- Patagonia Union High School District

Elementary:

- Patagonia Elementary District
- Santa Cruz Elementary District
- Sonoita Elementary District

== County population ranking ==
The population ranking of the following table is based on the 2010 census of Santa Cruz County.

† county seat

Rank	City/Town/etc.	Population (2010 Census)	Municipal type	Incorporated
1	† Nogales	20,837	City	
2	Rio Rico	18,962	CDP	
3	Tubac	1,191	CDP	
4	Patagonia	913	Town	
5	Sonoita	818	CDP	
6	Tumacacori-Carmen	393	CDP	
7	Amado	295	CDP	
8	Beyerville	177	CDP	
9	Elgin	161	CDP	
10	Kino Springs	136	CDP	

== Politics ==
United States presidential election results for Santa Cruz County, Arizona
Year	Republican		Democratic		Third party(ies)	
Year	No.	%	No.	%	No.	%
1912	56	11.94%	250	53.30%	163	34.75%
1916	666	46.19%	726	50.35%	50	3.47%
1920	850	54.63%	706	45.37%	0	0.00%
1924	579	39.93%	673	46.41%	198	13.66%
1928	919	48.78%	962	51.06%	3	0.16%
1932	625	27.65%	1,606	71.06%	29	1.28%
1936	742	29.33%	1,729	68.34%	59	2.33%
1940	978	38.87%	1,536	61.05%	2	0.08%
1944	727	35.95%	1,291	63.85%	4	0.20%
1948	1,058	42.00%	1,424	56.53%	37	1.47%
1952	1,716	55.70%	1,365	44.30%	0	0.00%
1956	1,646	59.25%	1,131	40.71%	1	0.04%
1960	1,265	40.35%	1,868	59.59%	2	0.06%
1964	1,503	43.44%	1,955	56.50%	2	0.06%
1968	1,702	48.17%	1,557	44.07%	274	7.76%
1972	2,137	52.39%	1,866	45.75%	76	1.86%
1976	2,312	48.80%	2,265	47.80%	161	3.40%
1980	2,674	50.07%	2,089	39.12%	577	10.81%
1984	3,855	60.34%	2,463	38.55%	71	1.11%
1988	3,320	49.63%	3,268	48.85%	102	1.52%
1992	3,024	37.43%	3,512	43.47%	1,544	19.11%
1996	2,256	27.62%	5,241	64.17%	670	8.20%
2000	3,344	37.60%	5,233	58.84%	316	3.55%
2004	4,668	39.93%	6,909	59.11%	112	0.96%
2008	4,518	33.86%	8,683	65.07%	143	1.07%
2012	4,235	30.44%	9,486	68.19%	190	1.37%
2016	3,897	23.71%	11,690	71.14%	846	5.15%
2020	6,194	31.67%	13,138	67.16%	229	1.17%
2024	7,699	40.25%	11,265	58.90%	162	0.85%

Owing to its border location and Hispanic majority population, Santa Cruz is a strongly Democratic county, but it has been shifting Republican by considerable numbers. The last Republican to win the county was George H. W. Bush in 1988, and although the Republicans won the county in six consecutive elections from 1968 to 1988, three of these wins were by very narrow margins. Following the trends seen in majority Hispanic counties across the United States, Joe Biden defeated Donald Trump with 67.1% of the popular vote in the county, a slightly lower margin than Hillary Clinton's 71.1% vote share in 2016. Trump's gains were far higher than Biden's losses (at nearly 8%), due to a combination of third parties losing votes and higher turnout. Despite this rightward shift in the vote share, Santa Cruz County remained as the most Democratic-leaning county in Arizona until 2024, when Apache and Coconino counties voted slightly more Democratic than Santa Cruz County, as Trump had the best performance for a Republican in the county since their last win in 1988, cracking 40% in the county for the first time since then.

== Notable people ==
Charles Mingus, was born in Santa Cruz County in the border community of Nogales, Arizona.

Elizabeth Gutfahr, former elected county treasurer who confessed to embezzling more than $38 million between 2012 and 2024.

== Economy ==
Because it is the state's smallest county, Santa Cruz County's economic activity is also smaller. Its agriculture consists primarily of forage/hay, and the cattle products raised on that pasture and hay are almost 100% of farm products annually.

== See also ==
- National Register of Historic Places listings in Santa Cruz County, Arizona
