= Yuma Lettuce Days =

Annual festival occurring in Yuma, Arizona during late February and early March

Yuma Lettuce Days is an annual festival occurring in Yuma, Arizona during late February and early March. Due to the sunny desert climate and availability of water from the Colorado River, Yuma has become a major supplier of winter produce in the United States. This regional festival, like many regional vegetable festivals such as the Gilroy, California Garlic Festival or the Vidalia, Georgia Onion Festival, highlights a specific produce item that has become economically important for the area.

Taking place at the University of Arizona Yuma Agricultural Center Valley Farm, it consists of vendor and exhibitor displays, live entertainment, children's exhibits, agricultural demonstrations, the annual Harvest Dinner, and cooking demonstrations.

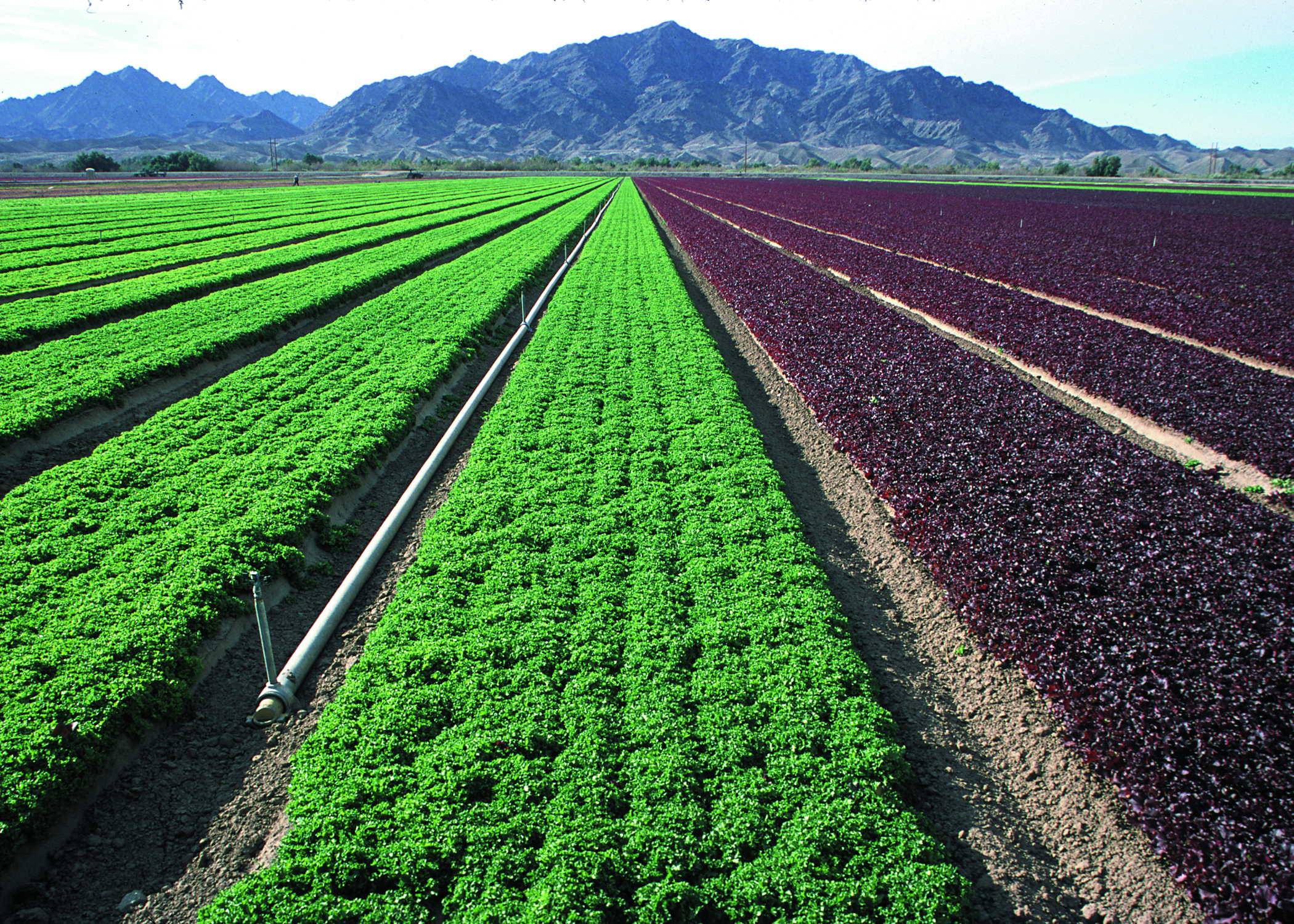
Photo of yuma lettuce field growing in Yuma, Arizona

== History and background of the Yuma Lettuce Festival ==
Yuma, Arizona, has been recognized as the sunniest place in the world, with a year-round average of 11 hours of sun a day. This, along with its rich river bottom soils and irrigation from the Colorado River, has made it one of the most important producers of winter vegetables in the United States. Up to 90% of the leafy vegetables grown in the U.S. from November to March originate in Yuma. To highlight the importance of Yuma as an important supplier of winter vegetables, especially leafy greens, the Yuma Lettuce Festival began as a partnership between the Yuma Visitors Bureau and the University of Arizona.

Additionally, the idea of "agritourism" as an additional source of income for traditionally agricultural areas has increased in popularity. Yuma sees its population nearly double in winter months due to the availability of RV parks, resorts, hotel rooms, and other tourist amenities. Festivals such as the Lettuce Festival, as well as other agricultural events, provide a mechanism for two of Yuma's major economic players to mutually support one another.

The Yuma Lettuce Festival has been a yearly event since 1999. Originally, the festival took place as a street festival in downtown Yuma on Main Street. However, some felt that the Lettuce Festival became too arts-and-crafts oriented in this location, and wished to re-emphasize the agricultural connection As a result, in 2011 the festival was moved to the historic Quartermaster's Depot in an effort to again highlight Yuma area agriculture. This move did concern some Main Street businesses, as they saw the festival had increased foot traffic and sales. The continued growth of the Lettuce Festival over the next four years required a subsequent move in 2015 to its current location at the Yuma Agricultural Center's Valley Farm.

In 2011, the Festival earned the Arizona Governor's Tourism Award as best Arizona special event in a community of 75,000 or greater population.

== Economic impact ==
The economic importance of lettuce to Yuma, Arizona is quite significant. Agriculture is the largest private sector of the economy in Yuma, with the Yuma area providing 1/3 of Arizona's total agricultural income, generating more than 3.2 billion dollars of revenue. Nine salad plants process more than two million pounds of salad per day during the peak of production, and employ 50,000 workers.

The festival has seen more than 50,000 attendees in past years, making it a significant source of tourism dollars for the area. Many local agribusinesses supply sponsorship to the event, and sponsorship of specific festival events is actively sought (and successfully received) by the Yuma Visitors Bureau.

Additionally, agritourism is seen as a growth area, and according to USDA Ag Census data, agritourism income in Arizona grew more than fivefold from 2002 to 2007, while the national growth of agritourism "merely" tripled. Since 2010, the Yuma Visitors Bureau has been increasing Yuma's appeal as an agritourism destination by encouraging and developing events such as the Yuma Lettuce Festival as part of an agritourism initiative. The continued development of the Yuma Lettuce Festival from a street festival to an agricultural showcase reflects this tendency to align Yuma's tourism industry with its agricultural economy. The growth of the Yuma Lettuce Days has been shown by its movement to successively larger venues, as well as the support it receives from the local agribusiness community in the form of sponsorship and promotion. Yuma Lettuce Days may be seen as a successful project by the Yuma Visitors Bureau in capitalizing on both tourism and awareness of the agricultural industry in Yuma. However, the Lettuce Festival is not Yuma's only successful foray into agritourism. A series of "Field to Feast" and "Farmer to Farmer" tours, as well as several dinner events, have shown enough support to become sold-out events

== Move to Yuma Agricultural Center ==
As the festival grew in size, it moved again in 2015 to the University of Arizona College of Agriculture and Life Science's Yuma Agricultural Center research farm to provide an even more agriculturally relevant setting. The new site of the festival is on the Agricultural Center's Valley Farm, a 247-acre working research farm with many projects that support the area vegetable industry.

The new setting increased the space available for the festival, as well as giving access to existing University of Arizona infrastructure including greater refrigeration capacity. The new site included several acres of grass grown specifically for the event, as well as increased parking capacity.

The new location also provided space for three stages (Family, Cooking, and Entertainment), a Kid's Corner with petting zoo, and space for agricultural demonstrations and heavy equipment displays.

== Festival events for 2015 ==
The move in 2015 to the Yuma Agricultural Research Farm allowed for the creation of an Agricultural Demonstration Area. The 2015 agricultural demonstrations included six different areas.

=== Presentations ===
Presentations for 2015 included

- Fertilizer Management
- Agricultural Equipment and Implements
- Lettuce Culture
- Information on the Yuma Agricultural Center's Spinach Trial, where visitors were able to tour one of the largest field test plantings of spinach.
- Irrigation Efficiency, a demonstration of an automated thinning machine.
- Ongoing demonstrations on fresh produce safety and an Equipment Display area.

=== Celebrity chefs ===
The Lettuce Festival is usually headlined by a "celebrity chef", who provides cooking demonstrations during the festival.

Past celebrity chefs include:

2015: Hosea Rosenberg, winner of Top Chef season 5

2014: Chris "CJ" Jacobson, appeared Top Chef season 3

2013: Ben Ford (son of Harrison Ford)

2012: Brian Malarkey

2011: Ray Duey, who has returned by popular demand to subsequent Lettuce Festivals to demonstrate his skill in his decoratively carved fruits and vegetables.

=== Event lineup ===
The 2015 Lettuce Festival lineup included:

==== All day events ====
These events were available for the entire duration of the festival.

- Dole Kid's Ag-tivities area
- Farmer's Market highlighting local produce. Yuma is a producer of citrus, wheat, and dates along with winter leafy greens.
- Tanimura & Antle Pot-A-Plant booth
- Salsa Cantina
- Saddles of Joy Petting Farm
- Food and beverage vendors
- Beer garden
- Pump It Up! activity stations, designed to encourage fitness.
- University of Arizona-sponsored Fresh Produce Safety presentation
- Chef Ray Duey vegetable carving demonstrations

==== Other events ====
- $5 tours of the Yuma Agricultural Center farm via an open-air "YACmobile", available only to Lettuce Days ticket holders.
- Recipe Box tasting event, a 21 and over ticketed "event-in-event" where the $10 entry fee benefited Yuma school garden projects. Event attendees are able to sample dishes created by local restaurants.
- "Toss It Up", a salad bar with dressing made by a local chef which raised funds for local 4-H and Future Farmers of America clubs
- Harvest Dinner, featuring items produced in the Desert Southwest. This event has been very popular in past years, and tickets frequently sell out within an hour. The Harvest Dinner benefits the Yuma County Ag Producers Scholarship Fund

Past events have included a lettuce box car derby

== Festival entertainment ==
Live Entertainment was offered on three stages: Family, Entertainment, and Cooking.

On the Family Stage, performers included:

- The Original Connors
- All-City Jazz Band
- Alyse Negroni
- Christian Chavez
- Clinton Bianco
- Destiny Istre
- Jawhara Belly Dance Troupe
- JOY (Jazz of Yuma) dance group
- Taylor Biggs
- Travis Seay
- Yexalen Folkloric Dancers

On the Entertainment stage, performers included：

- Alien vs. Predator
- Bourbon Street Trio
- Common Ground with Wendy Lobeck-McKay
- Whitehorse Band
- Yuma Jazz Company

Cooking Stage events included cooking demos by the headlining chef Hosea Rosenberg, as well as events with local Yuma chefs, the JV Smith Chop-Chop Challenge, a student competition where competitors received a "mystery basket" of ingredients and were to create a dish including everything in the basket within a set amount of time, and a Hops Harmony beer pairing demonstration by Chef Alex Trujillo.

== Major festival sponsors ==
Although the Festival is largely produced by the Yuma Visitors Bureau and the University of Arizona, the festival receives sponsorship from both local businesses and larger corporations. Past festival sponsors for 2015 have included:

- Centurylink
- Hilton Garden Inn
- Sprint

=== Food and beverage companies, farms, nurseries and gardens ===
- Budweiser
- Dole
- Earthbound Farm Organic
- Sunset Nursery Inc
- Tanimura & Antle
- Taylor Farms
- Yuma Nursery Supply
