= Kino Springs, Arizona =

CDP in Santa Cruz County, Arizona

- Census-designated place
- Location within Arizona Location within the United States
- Coordinates: 31°21′47″N 110°48′36″W
- Country: United States
- State: Arizona
- County: Santa Cruz

Area
  - Total: 0.26 sq mi (0.67 km^{2})
  - Land: 0.26 sq mi (0.67 km^{2})
  - Water: 0 sq mi (0.00 km^{2})
- Elevation: 3,999 ft (1,219 m)

Population (2020)
  - Total: 166
  - Density: 642.4/sq mi (248.05/km^{2})
- Time zone: UTC-7 (MST (no daylight saving time))
- ZIP code: 85621
- Area code: 520
- FIPS code: 04-37935
- GNIS feature ID: 36683

Kino Springs is a census-designated place (CDP) in Santa Cruz County, Arizona, United States. The population was 136 at the 2010 census.

== Geography ==
Kino Springs is located 3 miles (5 km) southeast of Beyerville and 5 miles (8 km) east of Nogales. Kino Springs lies on the western foothills of the Patagonia Mountains with the highest peak, Mount Washington, rising approximately four miles due east. The Mexican border lies about 1.5 miles to the south.

According to the United States Census Bureau, the CDP has a total area of 0.27 square miles (0.7 km^{2}), all land.

== Demographics ==
Historical population
| Census | Pop. | Note | %± |
|---|---|---|---|
| 2010 | 136 | | — |
| 2020 | 166 | | 22.1% |
U.S. Decennial Census

== See also ==
- List of census-designated places in Arizona
