= Avenue B and C, Arizona =

CDP in Yuma County, Arizona

- CDP
- Location of Avenue B and C in Yuma County, Arizona.

- Location in Arizona Location in the United States
- Coordinates: 32°43′09″N 114°39′35″W
- Country: United States
- State: Arizona
- County: Yuma

Area
  - Total: 0.74 sq mi (1.92 km^{2})
  - Land: 0.74 sq mi (1.91 km^{2})
  - Water: 0.0077 sq mi (0.02 km^{2})
- Elevation: 131 ft (40 m)

Population (2020)
  - Total: 4,101
  - Density: 5,575.0/sq mi (2,152.53/km^{2})
- Time zone: UTC-7 (MST (no DST))
- ZIP code: 85364
- Area code: 928
- FIPS code: 04-04710\
- GNIS feature ID: 2582733

Avenue B and C or B&C Colonia is a census-designated place (CDP) and colonia in Yuma County, Arizona, United States. The population was 4,176 at the 2010 census. Areas that are part of Avenue B and C were first subdivided in the 1920s and 1930s. The colonia received a sewer system in 2011. It is the fifth most populous community in Yuma County and second most populous CDP (behind Fortuna Foothills).

== Demographics ==
Historical population
Census	Pop.	Note	%±
2010	4,176		—
2020	4,101		−1.8%
U.S. Decennial Census

Avenue B and C first appeared on the 2010 U.S. Census as a census-designated place (CDP).

=== 2020 census ===
As of the 2020 census, Avenue B and C had a population of 4,101. The median age was 36.1 years. 25.5% of residents were under the age of 18 and 17.9% of residents were 65 years of age or older. For every 100 females there were 97.2 males, and for every 100 females age 18 and over there were 94.7 males age 18 and over.

99.2% of residents lived in urban areas, while 0.8% lived in rural areas.

There were 1,564 households in Avenue B and C, of which 33.8% had children under the age of 18 living in them. Of all households, 40.0% were married-couple households, 24.4% were households with a male householder and no spouse or partner present, and 29.7% were households with a female householder and no spouse or partner present. About 30.4% of all households were made up of individuals and 14.7% had someone living alone who was 65 years of age or older.

There were 1,964 housing units, of which 20.4% were vacant. The homeowner vacancy rate was 1.6% and the rental vacancy rate was 16.9%.

Racial composition as of the 2020 census
Race	Number	Percent
White	1,359	33.1%
Black or African American	55	1.3%
American Indian and Alaska Native	97	2.4%
Asian	11	0.3%
Native Hawaiian and Other Pacific Islander	0	0.0%
Some other race	1,171	28.6%
Two or more races	1,408	34.3%
Hispanic or Latino (of any race)	3,252	79.3%

== Education ==
Avenue B and C is served by the Crane Elementary School District and the Yuma Union High School District. The zoned middle school is Centennial Middle School. Yuma High School is the zoned high school.
