= Padre Ranchitos, Arizona =

CDP in Yuma County, Arizona

- CDP
- Location within the state of Arizona Padre Ranchitos (the United States)
- Coordinates: 32°38′59″N 114°38′30″W
- Country: United States
- State: Arizona
- County: Yuma
- Established: 1970

Area
  - Total: 0.29 sq mi (0.75 km^{2})
  - Land: 0.29 sq mi (0.75 km^{2})
  - Water: 0 sq mi (0.00 km^{2})
- Elevation: 118 ft (36 m)

Population (2020)
  - Total: 133
  - Density: 458.4/sq mi (176.99/km^{2})
- Time zone: UTC-7 (MST)
- ZIP code: 85365
- Area code: 928
- FIPS code: 04-51800
- GNIS feature ID: 2582838

Padre Ranchitos is a census-designated place (CDP) situated near both the international border with Mexico, and the state border with California, in Yuma County, Arizona, United States. The population was 171 at the 2010 census.

== Geography ==
According to the United States Geological Survey, the CDP has a total area of 0.29 square miles (0.75 km^{2}), all land.

== Demographics ==
Historical population
Census	Pop.	Note	%±
2010	171		—
2020	133		−22.2%
U.S. Decennial Census

As of the 2010 census, there were 171 people living in the CDP: 83 male and 88 female. 66 were 19 years old or younger, 28 were ages 20–34, 33 were between the ages of 35 and 49, 29 were between 50 and 64, and the remaining 15 were aged 65 and above. The median age was 31.1 years.

The racial makeup of the CDP was 54.4% White, 5.8% Asian, 2.3% American Indian, 0.6% Black or African American, 26.9% Other, and 9.9% two or more races. 78.4% of the population were Hispanic or Latino of any race.

There were 42 households in the CDP, 38 family households (90.5%) and 4 non-family households (9.5%), with an average household size of 4.07. Of the family households, 33 were married couples living together, with 1 single father and 4 single mothers; while the non-family households included 3 adults living alone: 2 male and 1 female.

The CDP contained 46 housing units, of which 42 were occupied and 4 were vacant.

== Education ==
Padre Ranchitos is served by the Crane Elementary School District and the Yuma Union High School District.

The zoned elementary and middle schools are Mesquite School (elementary) and Crane Middle School. Kofa High School is the zoned high school.
