= Aztec, Arizona =

CDP in Yuma County, Arizona

- Census designated place
- Location of Aztec in Yuma County, Arizona.

- Location of Aztec in Arizona
- Coordinates: 32°48′27″N 113°26′33″W
- Country: United States
- State: Arizona
- County: Yuma

Area
  - Total: 6.37 sq mi (16.50 km^{2})
  - Land: 6.37 sq mi (16.50 km^{2})
  - Water: 0 sq mi (0.00 km^{2})
- Elevation: 509 ft (155 m)

Population (2020)
  - Total: 2
  - Density: 0.31/sq mi (0.12/km^{2})
- Time zone: UTC-7 (Mountain (MST))
  - Summer (DST): UTC-7 (MST)
- Area code: 520
- FIPS code: US Census profile 04-04930
- GNIS feature ID: 2582734

Aztec is a census designated place situated in Yuma County, Arizona, United States. It had a population of 47 as of the 2010 U.S. census. As of July 2015, Aztec had an estimated population of 52. It is located along Interstate 8 to the west of Tenmile Wash.

== Demographics ==
Historical population
Census	Pop.	Note	%±
1920	62		—
1930	296		377.4%
1940	31		−89.5%
1960	65		—
2010	47		—
2020	2		−95.7%
U.S. Decennial Census

Aztec first appeared on the 1920 U.S. Census as the Aztec Precinct of Yuma County. It appeared again in 1930, and recorded having a Spanish/Hispanic majority (the census would not separately feature that racial demographic again until 1980). Aztec's population was 31 in 1940. The population was 65 in the 1960 census. In 2010, it was made a census-designated place (CDP).

== Education ==
It is in the Hyder Elementary School District and the Antelope Union High School District.
