= Wall Lane, Arizona =

CDP in Yuma County, Arizona

- Census-designated place
- Location of Wall Lane in Yuma County, Arizona.

- Location within Arizona
- Coordinates: 32°39′26″N 114°42′38″W
- Country: United States
- State: Arizona
- County: Yuma

Area
  - Total: 0.44 sq mi (1.13 km^{2})
  - Land: 0.44 sq mi (1.13 km^{2})
  - Water: 0 sq mi (0.00 km^{2})
- Elevation: 112 ft (34 m)

Population (2020)
  - Total: 262
  - Density: 600.0/sq mi (231.68/km^{2})
- Time zone: UTC-7 (Mountain (MST))
- ZIP code: 85365
- Area code: 928
- GNIS feature ID: 2582895

Wall Lane is a census-designated place and colonia in Yuma County, in the U.S. state of Arizona. The population was 415 at the 2010 census.

== Geography ==
According to the U.S. Census Bureau, the community has an area of 0.436 square miles (1.13 km^{2}), all land.

== Education ==
Wall Lane is served by the Crane Elementary School District and the Yuma Union High School District.

The zoned elementary and middle schools are Mesquite School (elementary) and Crane Middle School. Cibola High School is the zoned high school.

== Demographics ==
Historical population
| Census | Pop. | Note | %± |
|---|---|---|---|
| 2010 | 415 | | — |
| 2020 | 262 | | −36.9% |
U.S. Decennial Census
