= Donovan Estates, Arizona =

CDP in Yuma County, Arizona

- CDP
- Location within the state of Arizona Donovan Estates (the United States)
- Coordinates: 32°42′34″N 114°40′41″W
- Country: United States
- State: Arizona
- County: Yuma

Area
  - Total: 0.13 sq mi (0.33 km^{2})
  - Land: 0.13 sq mi (0.33 km^{2})
  - Water: 0 sq mi (0.00 km^{2})
- Elevation: 125 ft (38 m)

Population (2020)
  - Total: 1,295
  - Density: 10,288.9/sq mi (3,972.55/km^{2})
- Time zone: UTC-7 (MST)
- ZIP code: 85364
- Area code: 928
- FIPS code: 04-19790
- GNIS feature ID: 2582773

Donovan Estates is a census-designated place (CDP) in Yuma County, Arizona, United States. The population was 1,508 at the 2010 census.

== Geography ==
According to the United States Geological Survey, the CDP has a total area of 0.12 square miles (0.31 km^{2}), all land.

== Demographics ==
Historical population
Census	Pop.	Note	%±
2010	1,508		—
2020	1,295		−14.1%
U.S. Decennial Census

=== 2020 census ===
As of the 2020 census, Donovan Estates had a population of 1,295. The median age was 34.9 years. 27.6% of residents were under the age of 18 and 17.2% of residents were 65 years of age or older. For every 100 females there were 91.9 males, and for every 100 females age 18 and over there were 97.3 males age 18 and over.

100.0% of residents lived in urban areas, while 0.0% lived in rural areas.

There were 373 households in Donovan Estates, of which 40.5% had children under the age of 18 living in them. Of all households, 49.6% were married-couple households, 15.3% were households with a male householder and no spouse or partner present, and 29.5% were households with a female householder and no spouse or partner present. About 14.8% of all households were made up of individuals and 7.5% had someone living alone who was 65 years of age or older.

There were 385 housing units, of which 3.1% were vacant. The homeowner vacancy rate was 1.0% and the rental vacancy rate was 7.7%.

Racial composition as of the 2020 census
Race	Number	Percent
White	293	22.6%
Black or African American	4	0.3%
American Indian and Alaska Native	17	1.3%
Asian	2	0.2%
Native Hawaiian and Other Pacific Islander	6	0.5%
Some other race	545	42.1%
Two or more races	428	33.1%
Hispanic or Latino (of any race)	1,204	93.0%

=== 2010 census ===
As of the 2010 census, there were 1,508 people living in the CDP: 736 male and 772 female. 586 were 19 years old or younger, 278 were ages 20–34, 230 were between the ages of 35 and 49, 289 were between 50 and 64, and the remaining 74 were aged 65 and above. The median age was 29.1 years.

The racial makeup of the CDP was 53.4% White, 0.6% Black or African American, 0.5% American Indian, 0.5% Asian, 0.4% Native Hawaiian and Other Pacific Islander, 38.7% Other, and 5.8% Two or More Races. 93.4% of the population were Hispanic or Latino of any race.

There were 374 households in the CDP, 333 family households (89%) and 41 non-family households (11%), with an average household size of 4.03. Of the family households, 221 were married couples living together, 27 were single fathers and 85 were single mothers; the non-family households included 31 adults living alone: 14 male and 17 female.

The CDP contained 394 housing units, of which 374 were occupied and 20 were vacant.

== Education ==
Donovan Estates is served by the Crane Elementary School District and the Yuma Union High School District. The zoned elementary and middle schools are H.L. Suverkrup School (elementary) and Crane Middle School. Cibola High School is the zoned high school.
