= Drysdale, Arizona =

CDP in Yuma County, Arizona

- CDP
- Location within the state of Arizona Drysdale (the United States)
- Coordinates: 32°38′42″N 114°42′24″W
- Country: United States
- State: Arizona
- County: Yuma

Area
  - Total: 0.17 sq mi (0.43 km^{2})
  - Land: 0.17 sq mi (0.43 km^{2})
  - Water: 0 sq mi (0.00 km^{2})
- Elevation: 108 ft (33 m)

Population (2020)
  - Total: 225
  - Density: 1,371.0/sq mi (529.34/km^{2})
- Time zone: UTC-7 (MST)
- ZIP code: 85365
- Area code: 928
- FIPS code: 04-20570
- GNIS feature ID: 2582776

Drysdale is a census-designated place (CDP) in Yuma County, Arizona, United States. The population was 272 at the 2010 census.

== Geography ==
According to the United States Geological Survey, the CDP has a total area of 0.16 square miles (0.41 km^{2}), all land.

== Demographics ==
Historical population
Census	Pop.	Note	%±
2010	272		—
2020	225		−17.3%
U.S. Decennial Census

As of the 2010 census, there were 272 people living in the CDP: 130 male and 142 female. 98 were 19 years old or younger, 50 were ages 20–34, 43 were between the ages of 35 and 49, 50 were between 50 and 64, and the remaining 31 were aged 65 and above. The median age was 59.0 years.

The racial makeup of the CDP was 55.9% White, 1.8% American Indian, and 42.3% Other. 90.8% of the population were Hispanic or Latino of any race.

There were 74 households in the CDP, 62 family households (83.8%) and 12 non-family households (16.2%), with an average household size of 3.68. Of the family households, all 50 were married couples living together, while the non-family households included 10 adults living alone: 7 male and 3 female.

The CDP contained 84 housing units, of which 74 were occupied and 10 were vacant.

== Education ==
Drysdale is served by the Crane Elementary School District and the Yuma Union High School District.

The zoned elementary and middle schools are Mesquite School (elementary) and Crane Middle School. Cibola High School is the zoned high school.
