= El Prado Estates, Arizona =

CDP in Yuma County, Arizona

- CDP
- Location within the state of Arizona El Prado Estates (the United States)
- Coordinates: 32°42′22″N 114°31′17″W
- Country: United States
- State: Arizona
- County: Yuma

Area
  - CDP: 0.97 sq mi (2.51 km^{2})
  - Land: 0.97 sq mi (2.51 km^{2})
  - Water: 0 sq mi (0.00 km^{2})
- Elevation: 148 ft (45 m)

Population (2020)
  - CDP: 320
  - Density: 330.3/sq mi (127.54/km^{2})
  - Metro: 201.6
- Time zone: UTC-7 (MST)
- ZIP code: 85365
- Area code: 928
- FIPS code: 04-22400
- GNIS feature ID: 2582782

El Prado Estates is a census-designated place (CDP) in Yuma County, Arizona, United States. The population was 504 at the 2010 census.

== Geography ==
The CDP has a total area of 0.97 square miles (2.5 km^{2}), all land. It is located east of Yuma on U.S. Route 95.

== Demographics ==
Historical population
| Census | Pop. | Note | %± |
|---|---|---|---|
| 2010 | 504 | | — |
| 2020 | 320 | | −36.5% |
U.S. Decennial Census

As of the 2010 census, there were 504 people living in the CDP: 245 male and 259 female. 192 were 19 years old or younger, 73 were ages 20–34, 126 were between the ages of 35 and 49, 72 were between 50 and 64, and the remaining 41 were aged 65 and above. The median age was 59.0 years.

The racial makeup of the CDP was 77.6% White, 1.2% Asian, 0.8% Black or African American, 0.6% American Indian or Alaskan Native, 0.6% Filipino, 17.1% Other, and 2.2% Two or more races. 84.5% of the population were Hispanic or Latino of any race.

There were 157 households in the CDP, 127 family households (80.9%) and 30 non-family households (19.1%), with an average household size of 3.21. Of the family households, 83 were married couples living together, with 14 single fathers and 30 single mothers, while the non-family households included 27 adults living alone: 15 male and 12 female.

The CDP contained 199 housing units, of which 157 were occupied and 42 were vacant.

== Education ==
El Prado Estates is served by the Yuma Elementary School District and the Yuma Union High School District.

The zoned elementary and middle schools are Desert Mesa Elementary School and Castle Dome Middle School. Gila Ridge High School is the zoned high school.
