= San Jose, Arizona =

CDP in Graham County, Arizona

San José
- Census-designated place
- Location of San Jose in Graham County, Arizona.

- Location within Arizona Location within the United States
- Coordinates: 32°49′01″N 109°35′45″W
- Country: United States
- State: Arizona
- County: Graham

Area
  - Total: 4.21 sq mi (10.91 km^{2})
  - Land: 4.19 sq mi (10.86 km^{2})
  - Water: 0.019 sq mi (0.05 km^{2})
- Elevation: 3,019 ft (920 m)

Population (2020)
  - Total: 467
  - Density: 111.3/sq mi (42.98/km^{2})
- Time zone: UTC-7 (Mountain (MST))
- ZIP code: 85546
- Area code: 928
- GNIS feature ID: 2582859

San José is a census-designated place in Graham County, Arizona, United States. Its population was 467 as of the 2020 census.

== Demographics ==
Historical population
Census	Pop.	Note	%±
2020	467		—
U.S. Decennial Census
