= Beyerville, Arizona =

Census-designated place in Santa Cruz County, Arizona

- Census-designated place
- Location within Arizona
- Coordinates: 31°23′25″N 110°52′42″W
- Country: United States
- State: Arizona
- County: Santa Cruz

Area
  - Total: 0.34 sq mi (0.87 km^{2})
  - Land: 0.34 sq mi (0.87 km^{2})
  - Water: 0 sq mi (0.00 km^{2})
- Elevation: 3,642 ft (1,110 m)

Population (2020)
  - Total: 72
  - Density: 215.0/sq mi (83.02/km^{2})
- Time zone: UTC-7 (MST (no daylight saving time))
- ZIP code: 85621
- Area code: 520
- FIPS code: 04-05970
- GNIS feature ID: 36551

Beyerville is a census-designated place (CDP) in Santa Cruz County, Arizona, United States. The population was 177 at the 2010 census.

== Geography ==
Beyerville is located along the Santa Cruz River. Arizona State Route 82 passes through the community. Nogales lies 4 miles (6 km) to the southwest, Patagonia lies 10 miles (16 km) northeast and Sonoita lies 19 miles (31 km) northeast along route 82.

According to the United States Census Bureau, the CDP has a total area of 0.35 square miles (0.9 km^{2}), all land.

== Demographics ==
Historical population
Census	Pop.	Note	%±
2010	177		—
2020	72		−59.3%
U.S. Decennial Census

Beyerville first appeared on the 2010 U.S. Census as a census-designated place (CDP). It was not a new place then, as it had had a school built in 1921.

== See also ==
- Little Red Schoolhouse
