= Valencia West, Arizona =

CDP in Pima County, Arizona

- CDP
- Location in Pima County and the state of Arizona

- Location in the United States
- Coordinates: 32°8′27″N 111°6′49″W
- Country: United States
- State: Arizona
- County: Pima

Area
  - Total: 9.53 sq mi (24.67 km^{2})
  - Land: 9.53 sq mi (24.67 km^{2})
  - Water: 0 sq mi (0.00 km^{2})

Population (2020)
  - Total: 14,101
  - Density: 1,480.5/sq mi (571.64/km^{2})
- Time zone: UTC-7 (MST (no DST))
- FIPS code: 04-78760

Valencia West is a census-designated place (CDP) in Pima County, Arizona, United States. The population was 9,355 at the 2010 census, a 293% increase over the population of 2,380 in 2000.

== Geography ==
Valencia West is located at 32°8′27″N 111°6′49″W (32.140958, -111.113649).

According to the United States Census Bureau, the CDP has a total area of 9.6 square miles (25 km^{2}), all land.

== Demographics ==
Historical population
Census	Pop.	Note	%±
1990	3,277		—
2000	2,380		−27.4%
2010	9,355		293.1%
2020	14,101		50.7%

=== 2020 census ===
As of the 2020 census, Valencia West had a population of 14,101. The median age was 32.7 years. 29.7% of residents were under the age of 18 and 10.9% of residents were 65 years of age or older. For every 100 females there were 95.5 males, and for every 100 females age 18 and over there were 94.1 males age 18 and over.

86.6% of residents lived in urban areas, while 13.4% lived in rural areas.

There were 4,308 households in Valencia West, of which 46.6% had children under the age of 18 living in them. Of all households, 55.0% were married-couple households, 15.5% were households with a male householder and no spouse or partner present, and 19.2% were households with a female householder and no spouse or partner present. About 14.1% of all households were made up of individuals and 5.4% had someone living alone who was 65 years of age or older.

There were 4,483 housing units, of which 3.9% were vacant. The homeowner vacancy rate was 1.2% and the rental vacancy rate was 4.7%.

Racial composition as of the 2020 census
Race	Number	Percent
White	5,047	35.8%
Black or African American	453	3.2%
American Indian and Alaska Native	792	5.6%
Asian	207	1.5%
Native Hawaiian and Other Pacific Islander	33	0.2%
Some other race	3,615	25.6%
Two or more races	3,954	28.0%
Hispanic or Latino (of any race)	9,905	70.2%

=== 2000 census ===
At the 2000 census there were 2,380 people, 676 households, and 548 families living in the CDP. The population density was 247.2 inhabitants per square mile (95.4/km^{2}). There were 738 housing units at an average density of 76.7 per square mile (29.6/km^{2}). The racial makeup of the CDP was 60.13% White, 1.34% Black or African American, 2.31% Native American, 0.13% Asian, 0.21% Pacific Islander, 32.94% from other races, and 2.94% from two or more races. 68.40% of the population were Hispanic or Latino of any race. Of the 676 households 50.9% had children under the age of 18 living with them, 56.8% were married couples living together, 17.3% had a female householder with no husband present, and 18.8% were non-families. 15.1% of households were one person and 4.0% were one person aged 65 or older. The average household size was 3.52 and the average family size was 3.91.

The age distribution was 38.2% under the age of 18, 9.9% from 18 to 24, 28.9% from 25 to 44, 16.8% from 45 to 64, and 6.2% 65 or older. The median age was 27 years. For every 100 females, there were 102.9 males. For every 100 females age 18 and over, there were 96.3 males.

The median household income was $28,323 and the median family income was $27,561. Males had a median income of $21,023 versus $22,955 for females. The per capita income for the CDP was $9,740. About 26.1% of families and 27.4% of the population were below the poverty line, including 35.4% of those under age 18 and 5.8% of those age 65 or over.

== Education ==
It is in the Tucson Unified School District.
