= Rio Rico, Arizona =

CDP in Santa Cruz County, Arizona

- Census-designated place
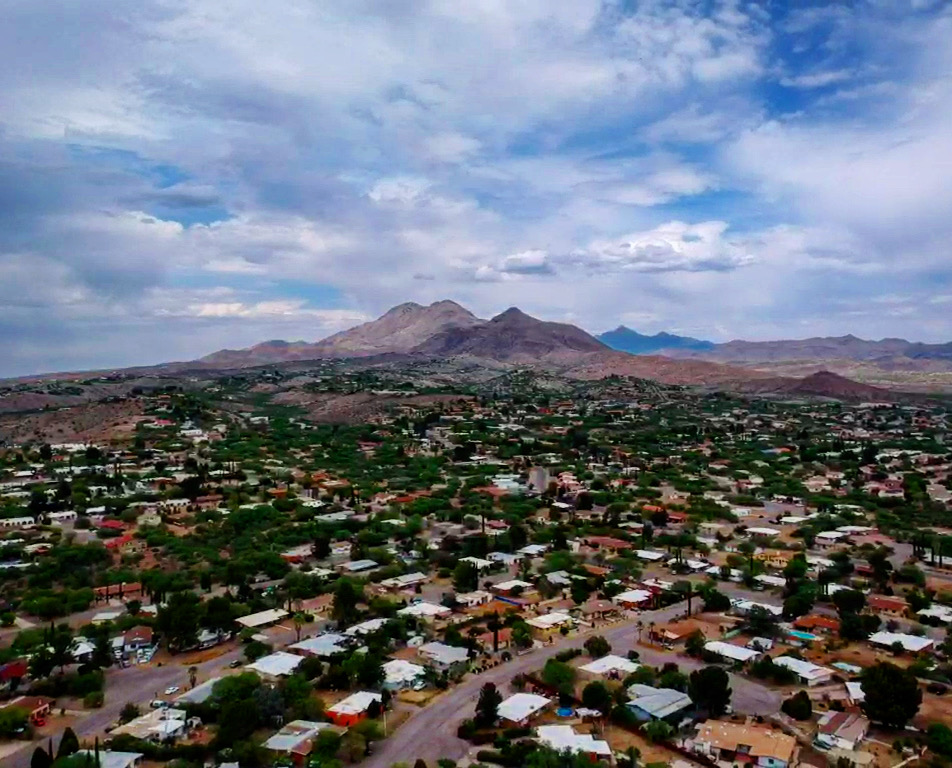
- The eastern half of Rio Rico along the foothills of the San Cayetano Mountains The eastern half of Rio Rico along the foothills of the San Cayetano Mountains

- Location of Rio Rico in Santa Cruz County, Arizona

- Location in Arizona Location in the United States
- Coordinates: 31°28′17″N 110°58′35″W
- Country: United States
- State: Arizona
- County: Santa Cruz

Area
  - Total: 63.27 sq mi (163.88 km^{2})
  - Land: 63.09 sq mi (163.39 km^{2})
  - Water: 0.19 sq mi (0.49 km^{2})
- Elevation: 3,481 ft (1,061 m)

Population (2020)
  - Total: 22,452
  - Density: 325.7/sq mi (125.77/km^{2})
- Time zone: UTC-7 (MST (no DST))
- ZIP code: 85648
- Area code: 520
- FIPS code: 04-60180

Rio Rico is an unincorporated community and census-designated place (CDP) in Santa Cruz County, Arizona, United States. The population is 22,452. The Rio Rico CDP replaced the former CDPs of Rio Rico Northwest, Rio Rico Northeast, Rio Rico Southwest, and Rio Rico Southeast.

== Geography ==
Rio Rico is located in Santa Cruz County, north of Nogales at the confluence of Sonoita Creek and the Santa Cruz River. According to the United States Census Bureau, the community has an area of 62.3 square miles (161.2 km^{2}), all land.

Rio Rico includes the site of the ghost town of Calabasas, Arizona.

== Demographics ==
Historical population
Census	Pop.	Note	%±
2010	18,962		—
2020	20,549		8.4%
U.S. Decennial Census

=== 2020 census ===
As of the 2020 census, Rio Rico had a population of 20,549. The median age was 35.8 years. 29.0% of residents were under the age of 18 and 13.4% of residents were 65 years of age or older. For every 100 females there were 93.3 males, and for every 100 females age 18 and over there were 89.1 males age 18 and over.

0.0% of residents lived in urban areas, while 100.0% lived in rural areas.

There were 6,479 households in Rio Rico, of which 45.9% had children under the age of 18 living in them. Of all households, 60.1% were married-couple households, 12.2% were households with a male householder and no spouse or partner present, and 21.7% were households with a female householder and no spouse or partner present. About 14.6% of all households were made up of individuals and 6.3% had someone living alone who was 65 years of age or older.

There were 6,822 housing units, of which 5.0% were vacant. The homeowner vacancy rate was 1.0% and the rental vacancy rate was 4.5%.

Racial composition as of the 2020 census
Race	Number	Percent
White	6,237	30.4%
Black or African American	85	0.4%
American Indian and Alaska Native	218	1.1%
Asian	132	0.6%
Native Hawaiian and Other Pacific Islander	10	0.0%
Some other race	6,823	33.2%
Two or more races	7,044	34.3%
Hispanic or Latino (of any race)	17,996	87.6%

=== 2010 census ===
As of the 2010 census, there were 18,962 people living in the community, making it Santa Cruz County's second-largest community after its historic population center and county seat, Nogales. The population density was 304.6 inhabitants per square mile (117.6/km^{2}). There were 6,356 housing units at an average density of 102.1 per square mile (39.4/km^{2}). The racial makeup of the community was 85.3% Hispanic or Latino, 0.4% Black or African American, 0.6% Native American, 0.5% Asian, 0.1% Pacific Islander, and 1.8% from two or more races. Approximately 11.4% of the population was non-Hispanic white.

== See also ==
- Baca land grants
- List of census-designated places in Arizona
