= Orange Grove Mobile Manor, Arizona =

CDP in Yuma County, Arizona

- CDP
- Location in the United States
- Coordinates: 32°35′54″N 114°39′38″W
- Country: United States
- State: Arizona
- County: Yuma
- Established: 1973

Area
  - Total: 0.062 sq mi (0.16 km^{2})
  - Land: 0.062 sq mi (0.16 km^{2})
  - Water: 0 sq mi (0.00 km^{2})
- Elevation: 177 ft (54 m)

Population (2020)
  - Total: 495
  - Density: 7,898.8/sq mi (3,049.74/km^{2})
- Time zone: UTC-7 (MST (no DST))
- ZIP code: 85350
- Area code: 928
- FIPS code: 04-51465
- GNIS feature ID: 2582836

Orange Grove Mobile Manor is a census-designated place (CDP) and colonia in Yuma County, Arizona, United States. The population was 555 at the 2010 census. It is part of the Yuma Metropolitan Statistical Area.

== Geography ==
Orange Grove Mobile Manor is located to the south of the East Cocopah Indian Reservation.

According to the United States Census Bureau, the CDP has a total area of 0.063 square miles (0.16 km^{2}), all land.

== Demographics ==
Historical population
Census	Pop.	Note	%±
2010	555		—
2020	495		−10.8%
U.S. Decennial Census

== Education ==
It is in the Somerton Elementary School District and the Yuma Union High School District.

Somerton High School is the zoned high school. It opened August 2023.
