= Rancho Mesa Verde, Arizona =

CDP in Yuma County, Arizona

- Census-designated place
- Location of Rancho Mesa Verde in Yuma County, Arizona.

- Location within Arizona
- Coordinates: 32°35′40″N 114°39′18″W
- Country: United States
- State: Arizona
- County: Yuma

Area
  - Total: 0.11 sq mi (0.29 km^{2})
  - Land: 0.11 sq mi (0.29 km^{2})
  - Water: 0 sq mi (0.00 km^{2})
- Elevation: 187 ft (57 m)

Population (2020)
  - Total: 571
  - Density: 5,084.6/sq mi (1,963.16/km^{2})
- Time zone: UTC-7 (Mountain (MST))
- ZIP code: 85350
- Area code: 928
- GNIS feature ID: 2582848

Rancho Mesa Verde is a census-designated place and colonia in Yuma County, in the U.S. state of Arizona. The population was 625 at the 2010 census.

== Geography ==
According to the U.S. Census Bureau, the community has an area of 0.112 square miles (0.29 km^{2}), all land.

== Demographics ==
Historical population
Census	Pop.	Note	%±
2010	625		—
2020	571		−8.6%
U.S. Decennial Census

== Education ==
It is in the Somerton Elementary School District and the Yuma Union High School District.

Somerton High School is the zoned high school. It opened August 2023.
