= Gadsden, Arizona =

CDP in Yuma County, Arizona

- CDP
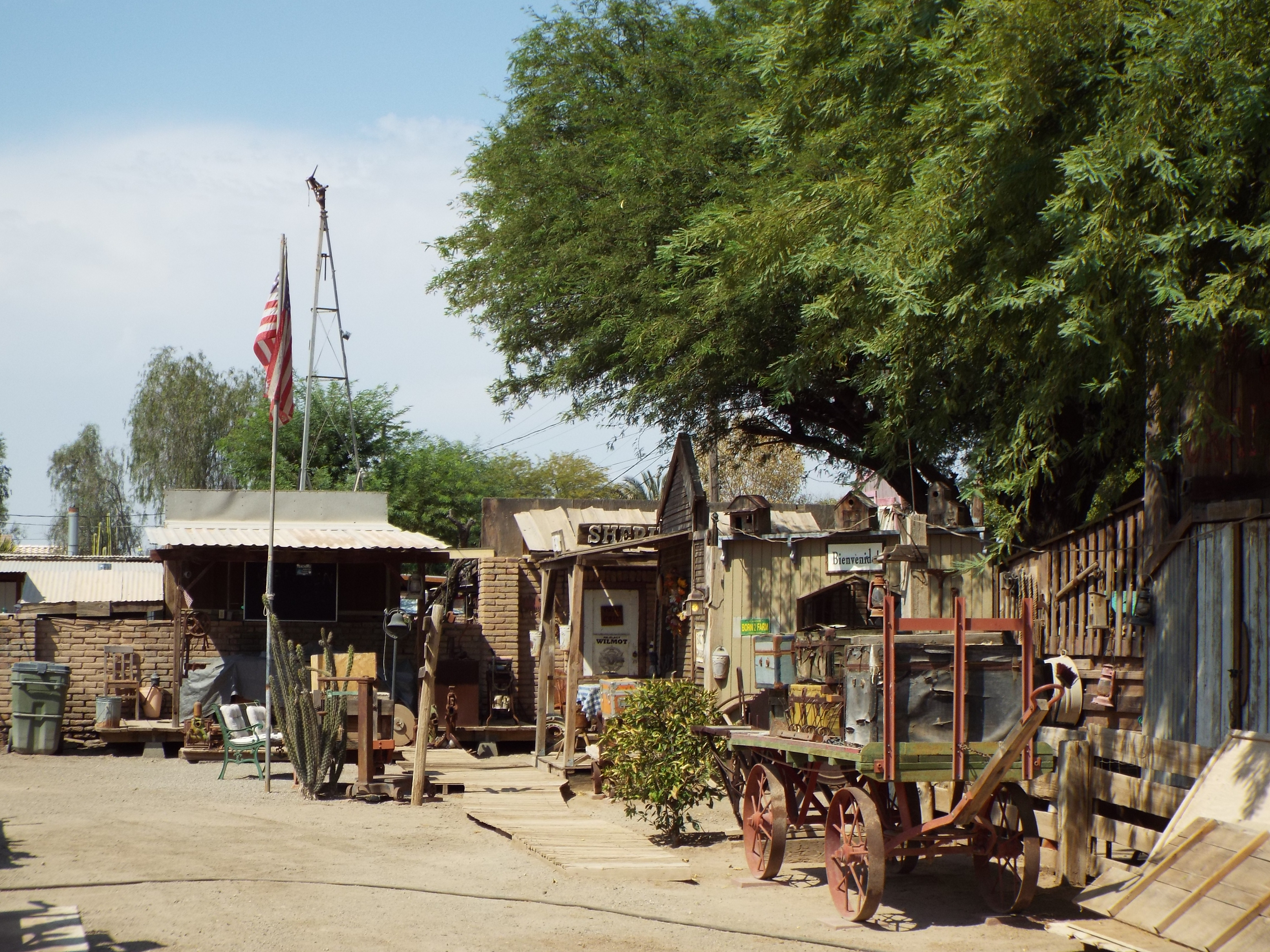
- Historic artifacts in the Gadsden Museum

- Location in Yuma County and the state of Arizona

- Location in Arizona Location in the United States
- Coordinates: 32°33′23″N 114°46′52″W
- Country: United States
- State: Arizona
- County: Yuma
- Established: 1914

Area
  - Total: 1.95 sq mi (5.06 km^{2})
  - Land: 1.95 sq mi (5.06 km^{2})
  - Water: 0 sq mi (0.00 km^{2})
- Elevation: 98 ft (30 m)

Population (2020)
  - Total: 571
  - Density: 292.5/sq mi (112.93/km^{2})
- Time zone: UTC-7 (MST (no DST))
- ZIP code: 85336
- Area code: 928
- FIPS code: 04-26070
- GNIS feature ID: 2408271

Gadsden is a census-designated place (CDP) and colonia in Yuma County, Arizona, United States. The population was 953 at the 2000 census. It is part of San Luis, Arizona and the Yuma County Metropolitan Statistical Area.

== Geography ==
Gadsden is located at 32°33′28″N 114°47′0″W (32.557903, -114.783280).

According to the United States Census Bureau, the CDP has a total area of 1.7 square miles (4.4 km^{2}), all land.

== Demographics ==
Historical population
Census	Pop.	Note	%±
2000	953		—
2010	678		−28.9%
2020	571		−15.8%
U.S. Decennial Census

As of the census of 2000, there were 953 people, 236 households, and 206 families residing in the CDP. The population density was 550.5 inhabitants per square mile (212.5/km^{2}). There were 287 housing units at an average density of 165.8 per square mile (64.0/km^{2}). The racial makeup of the CDP was 40.9% White, 3.6% Native American, 0.3% Asian, 0.2% Pacific Islander, 53.6% from other races, and 1.4% from two or more races. 93.8% of the population were Hispanic or Latino of any race.

There were 236 households, out of which 61.0% had children under the age of 18 living with them, 67.4% were married couples living together, 15.3% had a female householder with no husband present, and 12.7% were non-families. 11.9% of all households were made up of individuals, and 4.2% had someone living alone who was 65 years of age or older. The average household size was 4.04 and the average family size was 4.39.

In the CDP, the population was spread out, with 39.3% under the age of 18, 10.7% from 18 to 24, 27.8% from 25 to 44, 15.8% from 45 to 64, and 6.3% who were 65 years of age or older. The median age was 25 years. For every 100 females, there were 102.3 males. For every 100 females age 18 and over, there were 95.9 males.

The median income for a household in the CDP was $21,000, and the median income for a family was $21,000. Males had a median income of $18,365 versus $16,875 for females. The per capita income for the CDP was $6,562. About 41.7% of families and 45.2% of the population were below the poverty line, including 51.8% of those under age 18 and 12.1% of those age 65 or over.

== Education ==
Gadsden is served by the Gadsden Elementary School District and the Yuma Union High School District.

Somerton High School is the zoned high school.
