= San Luis High School =

Public high school in Arizona, United States

Location
- 1250 N. 8th Ave. San Luis, Arizona 85349; United States; 32°30′05″N 114°45′46″W

Information
- Type: Public high school
- Established: 2001 (25 years ago)
- School district: Yuma Union High School District
- CEEB code: 030449
- Principal: Leticia Anaya
- Staff: 102.30 (FTE)
- Grades: 9–12
- Enrollment: 2,586 (2023–2024)
- Student to teacher ratio: 25.28
- Colors: Forest Green and black
- Mascot: Sidewinder
- Website: sanluis.yumaunion.org

San Luis High School(SLHS) is a high school in San Luis, Arizona, United States. It opened in 2002 and is part of the Yuma Union High School District. The school mascot is the sidewinder.

It is the only public high school serving students from the city of San Luis. A number of students also commute from the nearby community of Gadsden and the city of San Luis Rio Colorado, Sonora across the border.

== History ==
The school was established in 2001 and first opened in 2002. It was built to serve the rapidly growing student population in San Luis and surrounding areas as part of the Yuma Union High School District (YUHSD). The establishment of SLHS reduced the need for long bus rides for students from San Luis attending high schools farther afield. The campus was constructed on land that was previously used for agricultural production, and to this day is surrounded by agricultural lands. There are canal systems adjacent to the school, operated by the Yuma County Water User's Association.

Over the years, the school itself has grown to meet the rapidly growing population it serves. In 2005 a YUHSD Bond funded the construction of a Performing Arts Center (PAC). The PAC is also known as an auditorium and is used for events such as awards recognitions. In 2020, the school opened a childcare center as part of a large-scale renovation of various CTE facilities.

In 2025, the school earned its first “A” grade in Arizona Department of Education accountability ratings.

In 2007, Arizona Western College opened its San Luis Branch campus adjacent to San Luis High School. The campus supports dual enrollment opportunities, allowing high school students to enroll in college courses offered after the regular school day.

== Notable alumni ==
- Irving Garcia, former New York Red Bulls soccer player
