= Vista High School (Arizona) =

Vista Alternative High School

Location
- 3150 S. Avenue A, Building C Yuma, AZ 85364; United States; 32°41′06″N 114°37′23″W

Information
- Type: Public Alternative high school
- Established: 1991 (35 years ago)
- School district: Yuma Union High School District
- CEEB code: 030571
- Principal: Laura Campbell
- Staff: 16.00 (FTE)
- Grades: 9-12
- Enrollment: 261 (2023–2024)
- Student to teacher ratio: 16.31
- Colors: Purple, silver, and white
- Mascot: Lobo
- Website: www.yumaunion.org/Vista

Vista Alternative High School (VAHS) is an alternative high school in Yuma, Arizona, Arizona, United States. It opened in 1991 and is part of the Yuma Union High School District. The school mascot is the Lobo.

== History ==
VAHS was designed to support students who are at-risk of dropping out of high school and those who have had difficulties at other schools. VAHS is normally only open to Juniors and Seniors, but in the past few years a small number of Sophomores have been admitted. Daily attendance at the school numbers around 200, allowing for a small school environment and smaller teacher-to-student ratios.

== Academics ==
VAHS offers diverse course options for its students including all core academic classes required by state law, as well as: art classes, culinary arts courses, sociology, marketing and hospitality courses. Additionally, an online academy is offered for students to take web-based courses on three days each week. During these sessions, students work independently but are supervised and supported by staff.
