= Cibola High School =

Cibola High School may refer to:

- Cibola High School (Arizona), Yuma
- Cibola High School (New Mexico), Albuquerque
