= Ron Jessie =

American football player (1948–2006)

No. 89, 81
- Position: Wide receiver

Personal information
- Born: February 4, 1948; Yuma, Arizona, U.S.
- Died: January 13, 2006 (aged 57); Huntington Beach, California, U.S.
- Listed height: 6 ft 0 in (1.83 m)
- Listed weight: 185 lb (84 kg)

Career information
- High school: Yuma
- College: Kansas
- NFL draft: 1971: 8th round, 206th overall pick

Career history
- Dallas Cowboys (1971)*; Detroit Lions (1971–1974); Los Angeles Rams (1975–1979); Buffalo Bills (1980–1981)
- * Offseason or practice squad member only

Awards and highlights
- Pro Bowl (1976); NCAA indoor long jump champion (1969); All-American long jump (1969)

Career NFL statistics
- Receptions: 265
- Receiving yards: 4,278
- Total touchdowns: 30
- Stats at Pro Football Reference

Ron Ray Jessie (February 4, 1948 – January 13, 2006) was an American professional football player who was a wide receiver in the National Football League (NFL) for the Detroit Lions, Los Angeles Rams and Buffalo Bills. He played college football for the Kansas Jayhawks.

== Early life ==
Jessie attended Yuma High School where he was a three-sport athlete: all-division in basketball, all-state in football and track & field.

After high school, he initially enrolled at Arizona Western College, before transferring to Imperial Valley College, where he played as a wide receiver and was a part of the track & field squad.

Jessie received a scholarship from the University of Kansas where he also practiced both sports. He was a part of the school's national championship track team in 1969, while winning the NCAA indoor long jump championship with a leap of 25–2.5 and receiving All-American honors. In other track meets, he high jumped 6–6 and was timed at 13.8 seconds in the 110 metres hurdles.

In football, he played running back in the same backfield with John Riggins and was also used as a split end. He finished with 33 receptions for 644 yards, more than 1,500 total yards in offense and 5 touchdowns. In 1970, he set a school record with 494 kickoff return yards.

In 2010, he was inducted into the Imperial Valley College Hall of Fame.

== Professional career ==
=== Dallas Cowboys ===
Jessie was selected by the Dallas Cowboys in the eighth round (206th overall) of the 1971 NFL draft. On July 27, he was traded to the Detroit Lions in exchange for a fourth-round draft choice (#93-Chuck Zapiec).

=== Detroit Lions ===
As a rookie, Jessie contributed mainly on kickoff returns. The next year, he became a starter at wide receiver and the team's deep threat, which included an 82-yard touchdown reception.

On April 8, 1974, Jessie signed with the Birmingham Americans for the 1975 season of the WFL, but the team folded at the end of the 1974 season. He finished the season ranked as the sixth leading wide receiver in the NFL with 761 yards and fourth in receptions (54).

The courts ruled in favor of the NFLPA and a new form of free agency was briefly instituted in 1975. After playing out his contract, Jessie was signed by the Los Angeles Rams, but then commissioner Pete Rozelle mandated the team to send the Lions their number one draft choice (#8-Dennis Lick) along with Cullen Bryant as compensation. Bryant filed for a temporary restraining order from the courts and would never play for the Lions. The Lions eventually traded the Rams' first round draft choice to the Chicago Bears, in exchange for their first (#10-James Hunter) and third round pick (#68-Russ Bolinger).

=== Los Angeles Rams ===
Jessie's best season was in 1976, when he was voted to the Pro Bowl after registering 34 receptions for 779 yards and six touchdowns. The next year, he was placed on the injured reserve list after suffering a knee injury against the San Francisco 49ers.

In 1979, Jessie was placed on the injured reserve list after suffering a broken leg against the New Orleans Saints, that also prevented him from playing in the 31–19 Super Bowl loss to the Pittsburgh Steelers.

On July 31, 1980, he was traded to the Buffalo Bills in exchange for a seventh-round draft choice (#187-Victor Simmons).

=== Buffalo Bills ===
Jessie was used in a reserve role during his two years with the Buffalo Bills.

== NFL career statistics ==
Legend
| | Led the league |
| **Bold** | Career high |

=== Regular season ===
| Year | Team | Games | | Receiving | | | | |
| Year | Team | GP | GS | Rec | Yds | Avg | Lng | TD |
|---|---|---|---|---|---|---|---|---|
| 1971 | DET | 14 | 1 | 4 | 87 | 21.8 | 51 | 0 |
| 1972 | DET | 14 | 14 | 24 | 424 | 17.7 | 82 | 4 |
| 1973 | DET | 14 | 12 | 20 | 364 | 18.2 | **84** | 3 |
| 1974 | DET | 12 | 12 | **54** | 761 | 14.1 | 46 | 3 |
| 1975 | RAM | 14 | 14 | 41 | 547 | 13.3 | 34 | 3 |
| 1976 | RAM | 14 | 14 | 34 | **779** | **22.9** | 58 | **6** |
| 1977 | RAM | 3 | 3 | 9 | 139 | 15.4 | 21 | 0 |
| 1978 | RAM | **16** | **16** | 49 | 752 | 15.3 | 49 | 4 |
| 1979 | RAM | 6 | 6 | 11 | 169 | 15.4 | 39 | 2 |
| 1980 | BUF | **16** | 3 | 4 | 56 | 14.0 | 20 | 1 |
| 1981 | BUF | 15 | 0 | 15 | 200 | 13.3 | 44 | 0 |
| | | 138 | 95 | 265 | 4,278 | 16.1 | 84 | 26 |

=== Playoffs ===
| Year | Team | Games | | Receiving | | | | |
| Year | Team | GP | GS | Rec | Yds | Avg | Lng | TD |
|---|---|---|---|---|---|---|---|---|
| 1975 | RAM | **2** | **2** | 8 | 104 | 13.0 | 18 | 0 |
| 1976 | RAM | **2** | **2** | 2 | 60 | **30.0** | **41** | 0 |
| 1978 | RAM | **2** | **2** | **10** | **150** | 15.0 | 29 | **1** |
| 1980 | BUF | 1 | 0 | 0 | 0 | 0.0 | 0 | 0 |
| 1981 | BUF | **2** | 0 | 1 | 12 | 12.0 | 12 | 0 |
| | | 9 | 6 | 21 | 326 | 15.5 | 41 | 1 |

== Personal life ==
After retiring as a player, Jessie became a scout for the Los Angeles Rams. He died in 2006, after suffering a heart attack in his Huntington Beach home.

In 1997, after playing basketball for the University of Utah, Jessie's son Brandon was signed as an undrafted free agent by the New York Giants.

A T-shirt bearing Jessie's last name was responsible for half the title of Rick Springfield's hit song "Jessie's Girl."
