= Gila Ridge High School =

Location
- 7150 East 24th Street; Yuma, Arizona 85365; United States
- 32°41′07″N 114°30′39″W

Information
- Type: Public high school
- Established: 2007; 19 years ago
- School district: Yuma Union High School District
- CEEB code: 034549
- Principal: Kathy Hoover
- Staff: 81.40 (FTE)
- Grades: 9-12
- Enrollment: 2,325 (2023–2024)
- Student to teacher ratio: 28.56
- Colors: Carolina blue, black, and silver
- Mascot: Hawks
- Rival: Cibola Raiders
- Website: yumaunion.org/GilaRidge

Gila Ridge High School is a public high school in Yuma, Arizona, United States. Gila Ridge is 1 of 7 high schools in the Yuma Union High School District. It opened to freshman and sophomores for the 2007–08 school year. The school's mascot are the Hawks. The school is located on 7150 East 24th Street, which is home to many other schools in the Yuma County District, including Desert Mesa Elementary, Mary A. Otondo Elementary, Castle Dome Middle School, Ron Watson Middle School and Sunrise Elementary. Gila Ridge is also located west of Arizona Western College.

In May 2010, Gila Ridge High School held its first graduation of students who had started at Gila Ridge as sophomores. In May 2011, the school's four-year graduating students became known as the first "100% Hawk" class.

Gila Ridge High School won the City Championship title (football) in 2014. The Hawks took the title from the Cibola Raiders who had held the title for the previous seven years. Gila Ridge's highest athletic achievement came in 2018, winning the Arizona 4a Division Soccer State Championship.

On Monday, February 26, 2018, a shooting threat in detail and resemblance to the Parkland shooting began to circulate that led to the cancellation of classes on the following Tuesday. Extra precautions were taken at other schools in the district.

On Monday, January 30, 2023, the school went on lockdown after shots were fired in the parking lot. Nearby school Arizona Western College also went on lockdown as police searched for the subject. The lockdown was lifted at 11:50 AM. No casualties were reported, other than two injuries that were not from gunshot wounds.
