= Carpe Diem e-Learning Community =

Charter school in Arizona, United States

Coordinates: 32°41′09″N 114°39′52″W

Information
- School type: Charter school
- Established: 2000; 26 years ago
- Mascot: Hedgehog

Carpe Diem e-Learning Community is a charter school for grades 6–12 in Yuma, Arizona. It began as a traditional charter school in 2000, but on losing its building lease, and forced into smaller premises, a blended learning model was developed that caps the middle and high schools in Yuma at 300 students each. There is a 75:1 ratio of students to specialist teachers, but the shortfall is made up from non certified teaching assistants and coaches. A fully online curriculum is also available, and students work on computers, both in the school and externally, using Edgenuity e-learning software.

During the 2015–2016 school year, the school was bought by Desert View Schools, and was subsequently renamed Desert View Middle and High School. In January 2020, the school announced its decision to abandon its high school and continue solely as a middle school.

== Bibliography ==
- Ark, Tom Vander (September 20, 2011). Getting Smart: How Digital Learning is Changing the World. John Wiley & Sons. ISBN 978-1-118-11587-9.
- Brady, Kevin P.; Umpstead, Regina R.; Eckes, Suzanne E. (2010). "Unchartered Territory: The Current Legal Landscape of Public Cyber Charter Schools". Brigham Young University Education and Law Journal. 2010: 191.
- Vanderkam, Laura (April 3, 2013). Blended Learning: A Wise Giver's Guide to Supporting Tech-assisted Teaching. The Philanthropy Roundtable. ISBN 978-0-9851265-6-8.
