= Yuma High School =

Location
- 400 S. 6th Avenue; Yuma, Arizona 85364; United States
- 32°43′08″N 114°37′43″W

Information
- Type: Public high school
- Established: 1909 (117 years ago)
- School district: Yuma Union High School District
- CEEB code: 030570
- Principal: Mike Fritz
- Staff: 46.40 (FTE)
- Grades: 9–12
- Enrollment: 1,122 (2023-2024)
- Student to teacher ratio: 24.18
- Colors: White, navy blue, and gray
- Mascot: Criminal
- Website: www.yumaunion.org/yumahs

Yuma High School (often referred to simply as Yuma High) is the oldest high school in Yuma, Arizona.

== History ==
The school was established in 1909. Yuma High's mascot came when the original school building was destroyed by fire in 1910. The school then used the Yuma Territorial Prison, which had been closed, for the next three years. Classes were held in the cell blocks, and assemblies took place in the prison hospital.

In 1912, the city of Yuma notified the school that the prison was needed as a city jail. In 1914, the school board began construction of a new school at 400 South 6th Avenue (where the current campus is today). That same year, the Yuma football team was dubbed "the Criminals" by fans of Phoenix Union High School, whose football team had just been defeated in the championship game. At first, this was a fighting word to the school community, but by 1917, it had stuck, and the name was officially adopted by the school board. Yuma Union thus became the only high school in the US to use the mascot; it is also the only high school in the United States whose mascot is copyrighted. References are sprinkled throughout; the mascot wears a blue-and-white prison uniform, the gate to the school's sports fields includes bars from the old prison, and the school's "Cell Block" shop sells themed apparel.

In 1958, the then-main gymnasium burned down.

More recent buildings on campus include the research building, union building, technology building, and the Snider Auditorium.

Graduating classes would contain at least 700 students.

== Notable alumni ==
- Curley Culp, Pro Football Hall of Fame defensive tackle
- Ron Jessie, former NFL wide receiver
- William B. Black, Jr., former deputy Director of the National Security Agency.
- Jason Maas, CFL head coach, winner of the Grey Cup with the Montreal Alouettes
