= Somerton Elementary School District =

School district in Yuma County, Arizona, United States

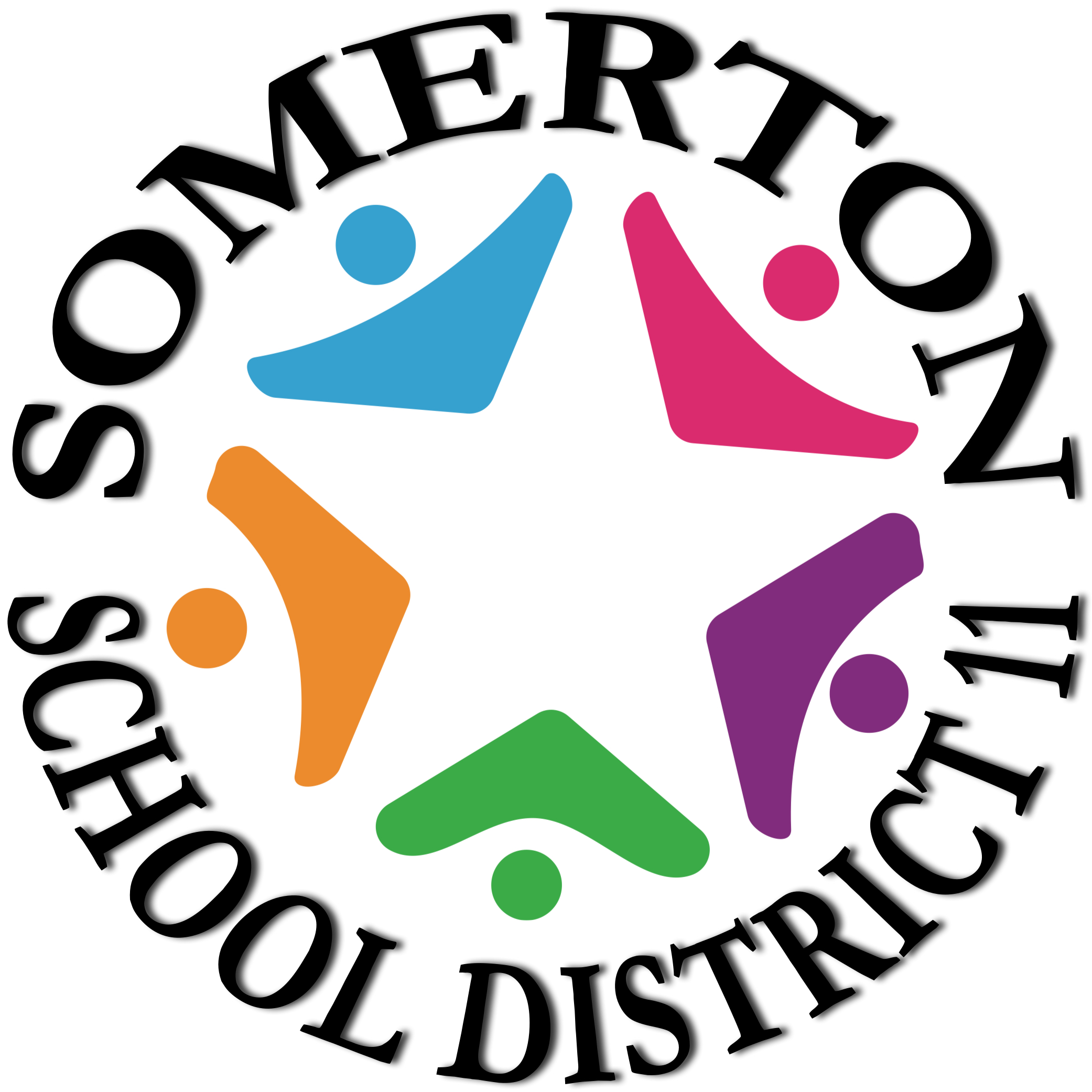
- 343 N Carlisle Ave Somerton, Arizona, 85350

District information
- Grades: K-8
- Superintendent: Dr. Laura Noel
- Schools: 6

Students and staff
- Staff: 200

Other information
- Website: https://www.ssd11.org/

Somerton School District 11 is a public school district located in Yuma County, Arizona, United States. It serves students residing in the city of Somerton and the eastern part of the city of San Luis. It also has Orange Grove Mobile Manor and Rancho Mesa Verde.

The district offers educational programs spanning pre-kindergarten through 8th grade, including an early childhood learning center and adult education programs. As of the 2023–2024 school year, the district serves approximately 2,600 students.

The district is governed by a five-member elected board, with daily administration led by a superintendent and associate superintendent. In fiscal year 2006, the district employed approximately 137 certified teachers, alongside instructional aides and support staff.

== Schools ==
=== K-6 ===
- Orange Grove Elementary
- Desert Sonora Elementary
- Encanto Learning Center
- Tierra del Sol Elementary
- Bravie T. Soto Elementary
- Sun Valley Elementary

=== 7-8 ===
- Somerton Middle School
