= Somerton High School =

School in Arizona, US

Coordinates: 32°36′9″N 114°43′14″W

Somerton High School is in Somerton, Arizona. It opened in 2023. It is in the Yuma Union High School District. It is at 1093 Jefferson Street. Toros are the school mascot.

It is in a community with many farmworkers in an area south of Yuma, Arizona that was previously served by Kofa High School and Cibola High School. Sports at the school include football, soccer and baseball.

It was designed by DLR Group and built by McCarthy Building Companies.

Lucky Arvizo is the school's principal. In November 2024, the school's new gymnasium, Plaza De Toros, debuted with a basketball court, a dance room, lockers, and a training room.

In 2025 it added a flag football team.

A cheer coach was fired from the school after allowing a male cheerleader who said he was being bullied to access her office in the girls' locker room.

Artwork by a student at the school was selected for the seal of Somerton's municipal court.
