= Irving Garcia (soccer, born 1988) =

American soccer player

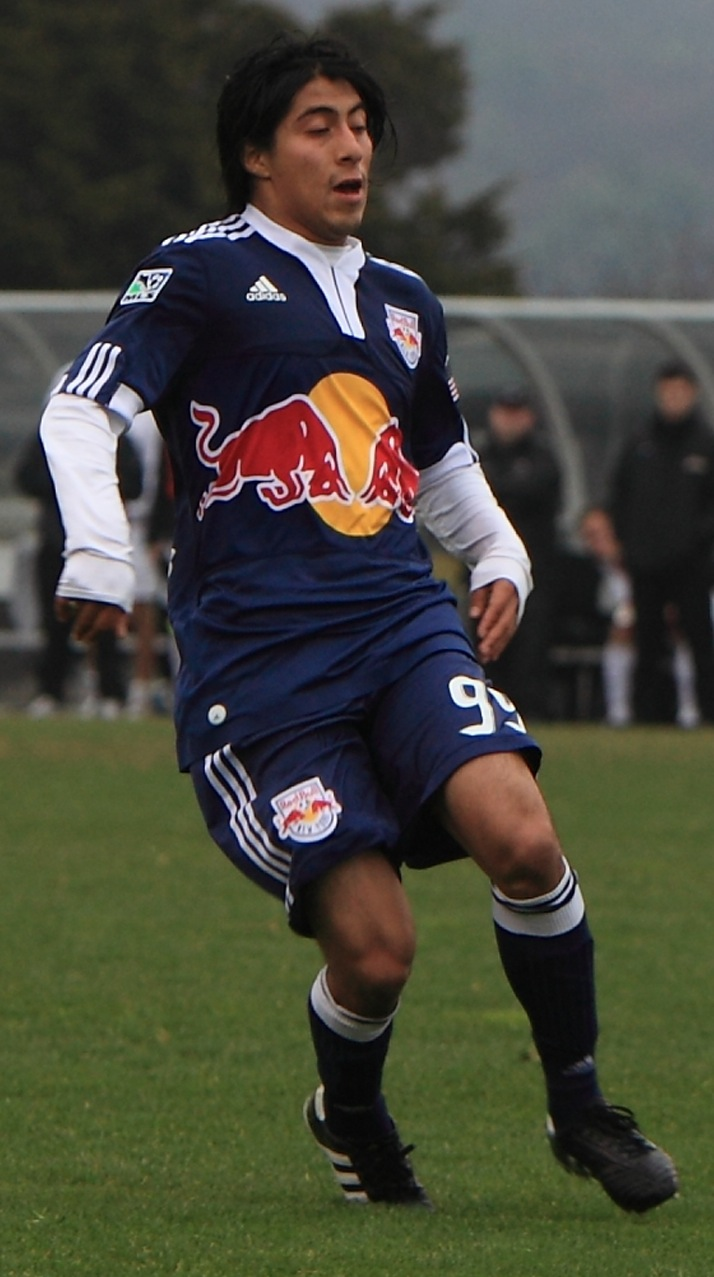

Personal information
- Date of birth: February 4, 1988 (age 38)
- Place of birth: Yuma, Arizona, United States
- Height: 5 ft 5 in (1.65 m)
- Positions: Attacking midfielder; right winger

Team information
- Current team: FC Arizona

College career
Years	Team	Apps	(Gls)
2006–2007	Yavapai Roughriders		
2008–2009	UC Irvine Anteaters		

Senior career*
Years	Team	Apps	(Gls)
2009	Orange County Blue Star	8	(0)
2010	New York Red Bulls	0	(0)
2011	Antigua GFC		
2012	Los Angeles Blues	16	(1)
2015	FC Rosario		
2016	Portland Timbers 2	0	(0)
2019–	FC Arizona	3	(0)
- * Club domestic league appearances and goals as of 1 July 2020

Irving Garcia (born February 4, 1988) is an American soccer player who currently plays for FC Arizona.

== Career ==
=== College and amateur ===
Garcia attended San Luis High School and played college soccer at Yavapai College from 2006 to 2007 before transferring to UC Irvine in 2008. At UC Irvine he appeared in 23 games, scoring 7 goals and adding 9 assists, and was a member of UC Irvine's 2008 and 2009 Big West championship teams, helping them to back to back Big West Championship titles, including two trips to the NCAA College Cup.

During his college years Garcia also played for Orange County Blue Star in the USL Premier Development League.

=== Professional ===
Garcia was drafted in the fourth round (50th overall) of the 2010 MLS SuperDraft by New York Red Bulls.

He made his professional debut on April 27, 2010, in a U.S. Open Cup game against Philadelphia Union. On May 26, 2010, he made his first official start for New York in a 3–0 U.S. Open Cup victory over Colorado Rapids. During the match, he assisted on New York's first goal and played 68 minutes.

Garcia was waived by New York on March 1, 2011. Later in 2011 he signed with Guatemalan side Antigua GFC.

In March 2012, Garcia signed with Los Angeles Blues of the USL Pro.
