= Somerton, Arizona =

City in Arizona, United States

- City
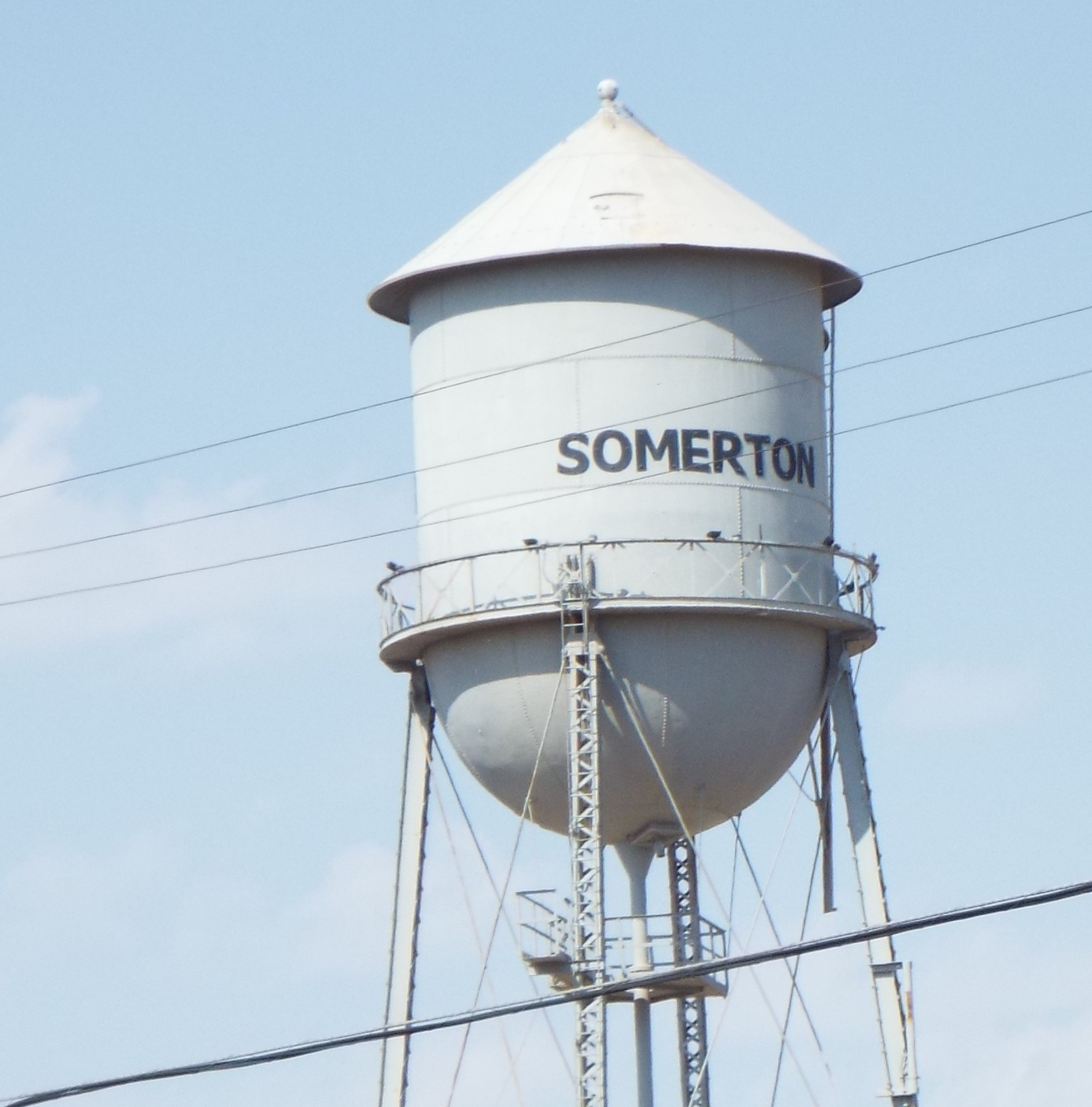
- Somerton's 50,000-Gallon Water Tank - 1920

- Flag Seal

- Location of Somerton in Yuma County, Arizona

- Location in Arizona Location in the United States
- Coordinates: 32°36′02″N 114°41′58″W
- Country: United States
- State: Arizona
- County: Yuma

Area
  - Total: 7.29 sq mi (18.87 km^{2})
  - Land: 7.27 sq mi (18.84 km^{2})
  - Water: 0.012 sq mi (0.03 km^{2})
- Elevation: 105 ft (32 m)

Population (2020)
  - Total: 14,197
  - Density: 1,951.6/sq mi (753.53/km^{2})
- Time zone: UTC-7 (MST (no DST))
- ZIP code: 85350
- Area code: 928
- FIPS code: 04-68080
- GNIS feature ID: 2411927
- Website: somertonaz.gov

Somerton is a city in Yuma County, Arizona, United States. As of the 2020 census, Somerton had a population of 14,197. It is part of the Yuma metropolitan area.

Somerton was established in 1898 and incorporated in 1918. Somerton's economy is based on agriculture, medical services, and tourism.

== Geography ==
According to the United States Census Bureau, the city has a total area of 1.3 square miles (3.4 km^{2}), all land.

== Demographics ==
Historical population
Census	Pop.	Note	%±
1920	938		—
1930	891		−5.0%
1940	1,247		40.0%
1950	1,825		46.4%
1960	1,613		−11.6%
1970	2,225		37.9%
1980	3,969		78.4%
1990	5,282		33.1%
2000	7,266		37.6%
2010	14,287		96.6%
2020	14,197		−0.6%
2022 (est.)	14,514	▲	2.2%
U.S. Decennial Census

=== 2020 census ===
As of the 2020 census, Somerton had a population of 14,197. The median age was 29.8 years. 33.6% of residents were under the age of 18 and 9.4% of residents were 65 years of age or older. For every 100 females there were 94.1 males, and for every 100 females age 18 and over there were 87.7 males age 18 and over.

97.5% of residents lived in urban areas, while 2.5% lived in rural areas.

There were 3,960 households in Somerton, of which 57.5% had children under the age of 18 living in them. Of all households, 54.3% were married-couple households, 13.1% were households with a male householder and no spouse or partner present, and 26.6% were households with a female householder and no spouse or partner present. About 11.8% of all households were made up of individuals and 5.4% had someone living alone who was 65 years of age or older.

There were 4,149 housing units, of which 4.6% were vacant. The homeowner vacancy rate was 1.0% and the rental vacancy rate was 3.3%.

Racial composition as of the 2020 census
Race	Number	Percent
White	3,040	21.4%
Black or African American	50	0.4%
American Indian and Alaska Native	123	0.9%
Asian	49	0.3%
Native Hawaiian and Other Pacific Islander	5	0.0%
Some other race	5,077	35.8%
Two or more races	5,853	41.2%
Hispanic or Latino (of any race)	13,777	97.0%

=== 2000 census ===
At the 2000 census, there were 7,266 people in 1,818 households, including 1,652 families, in the city. The population density was 5,483.2 inhabitants per square mile (2,117.1/km^{2}). There were 1,967 housing units at an average density of 1,484.4 per square mile (573.1/km^{2}). The racial makeup of the city was 44.5% White, 0.4% Black or African American, 0.7% Native American, 0.3% Asian, <0.1% Pacific Islander, 51.1% from other races, and 3.0% from two or more races. 95.2% of the population were Hispanic or Latino of any race.

Of the 1,818 households 59.4% had children under the age of 18 living with them, 70.9% were married couples living together, 16.3% had a female householder with no husband present, and 9.1% were non-families. 7.8% of households were one person and 4.2% were one person aged 65 or older. The average household size was 3.99 and the average family size was 4.21.

The age distribution was 38.9% under the age of 18, 11.2% from 18 to 24, 28.3% from 25 to 44, 14.4% from 45 to 64, and 7.2% 65 or older. The median age was 25 years. For every 100 females, there were 96.5 males. For every 100 females age 18 and over, there were 92.3 males.

The median household income was $26,544 and the median family income was $27,944. Males had a median income of $21,619 versus $16,677 for females. The per capita income for the city was $7,960. About 24.0% of families and 26.6% of the population were below the poverty line, including 31.8% of those under age 18 and 27.9% of those age 65 or over.

== Education ==
Almost all of the Somerton city limits is within the Somerton Elementary School District, while a small piece extends into the Crane Elementary School District. All of Somerton is in the Yuma Union High School District.

Somerton High School is the zoned high school. It opened August 2023.

PPEP TEC High Schools's José Yepez Learning Center is located in Somerton. Arizona Western College also offer courses at the Somerton Middle School campus.

== Events ==
Somerton has an annual Tamale Festival that benefits students from the area who will be attending Arizona State University. More than 20,000 visitors attend the festival each year. The festival is put together by The El Diablito Arizona State University (ASU) Alumni chapter. The chapter was established by ASU graduates who have returned to work and live in the Yuma/Somerton/San Luis areas.

== Transportation ==
Somerton is served by Yuma County Area Transit, which connects with Greyhound in Yuma.

== Popular culture ==
The town was used for the 2013 film The Last Stand, although no filming took place in the town itself.

== Mayor and City Council ==
The Somerton City Council is a nonpartisan governing body consisting of seven elected members by the registered voters of Somerton, Arizona.

=== Mayor ===
The position of mayor is elected to serve a 4-year term, directly elected by the registered voters of Somerton. The mayor of the City of Somerton is the chief executive officer of the city. The mayor also serves as the leading chair in Somerton Council meetings. The position of mayor is equipped with the authority to approve actions and create suggestions to be acknowledged by the city council. The current mayor of Somerton, Arizona as of August 2026, is Gerardo Anaya.

=== Vice mayor ===
The vice mayor is elected by majority vote between the council members. The vice mayor may serve in place of the city mayor due to absence. The vice mayor does not have a fixed term but rather serves at the discretion of the council. After each election the vice mayor's terms may be extended. The current vice mayor of Somerton, Arizona as of August 2026, is Juan Castillo.

=== Council ===
Somerton City Council members are elected in staggering terms that are set for a period of 4 years. The city council includes both mayor and vice mayor, with the entirety of the council equipped with collective power to assist the City of Somerton. The current city council members include Gerardo Anaya, Juan Castillo, Miguel Villalpando, Martha Gonzalez, Jesus Roldan, Lorena Delgadillo, and Luis Galindo.

== Images of Somerton ==
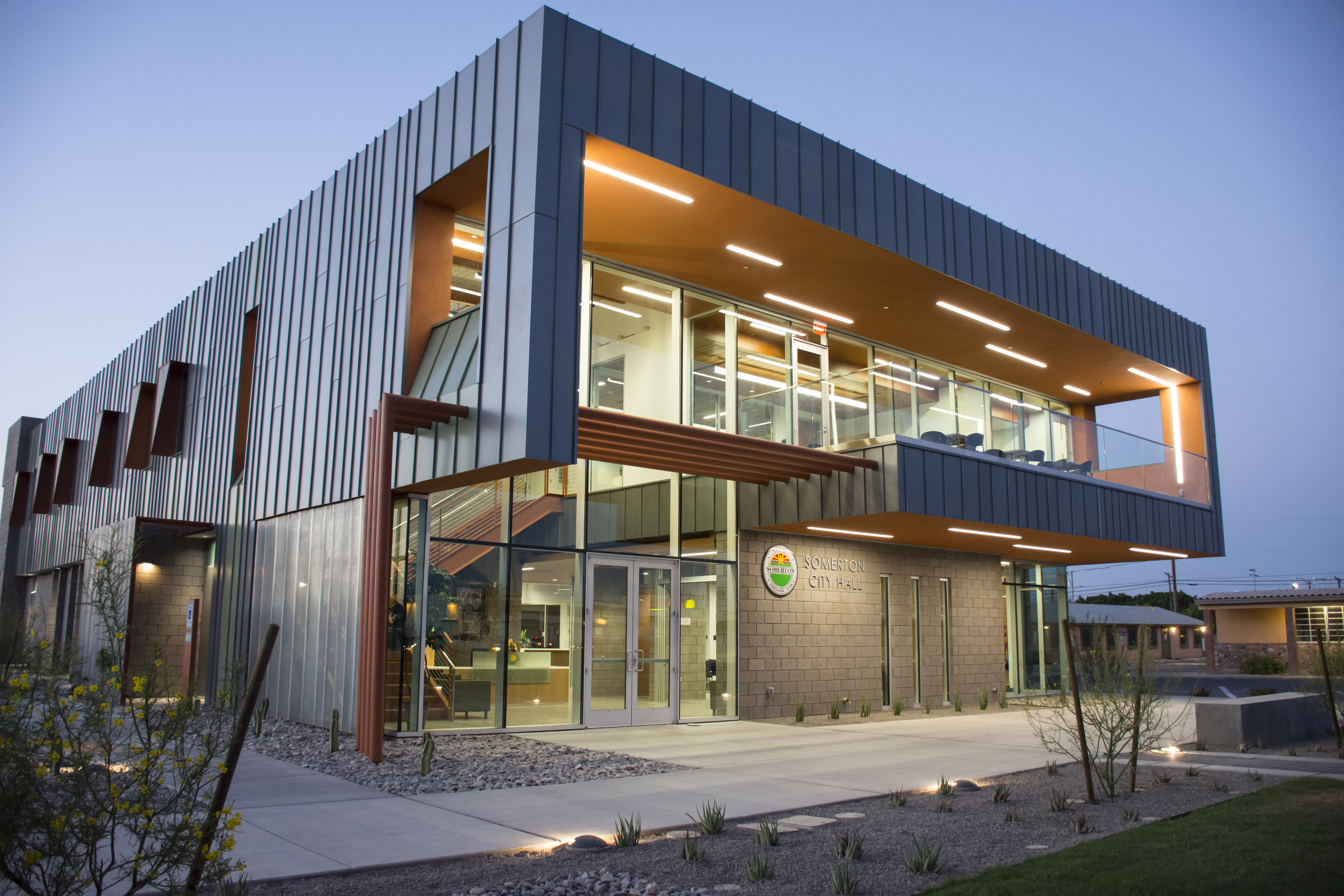
Somerton City Hall

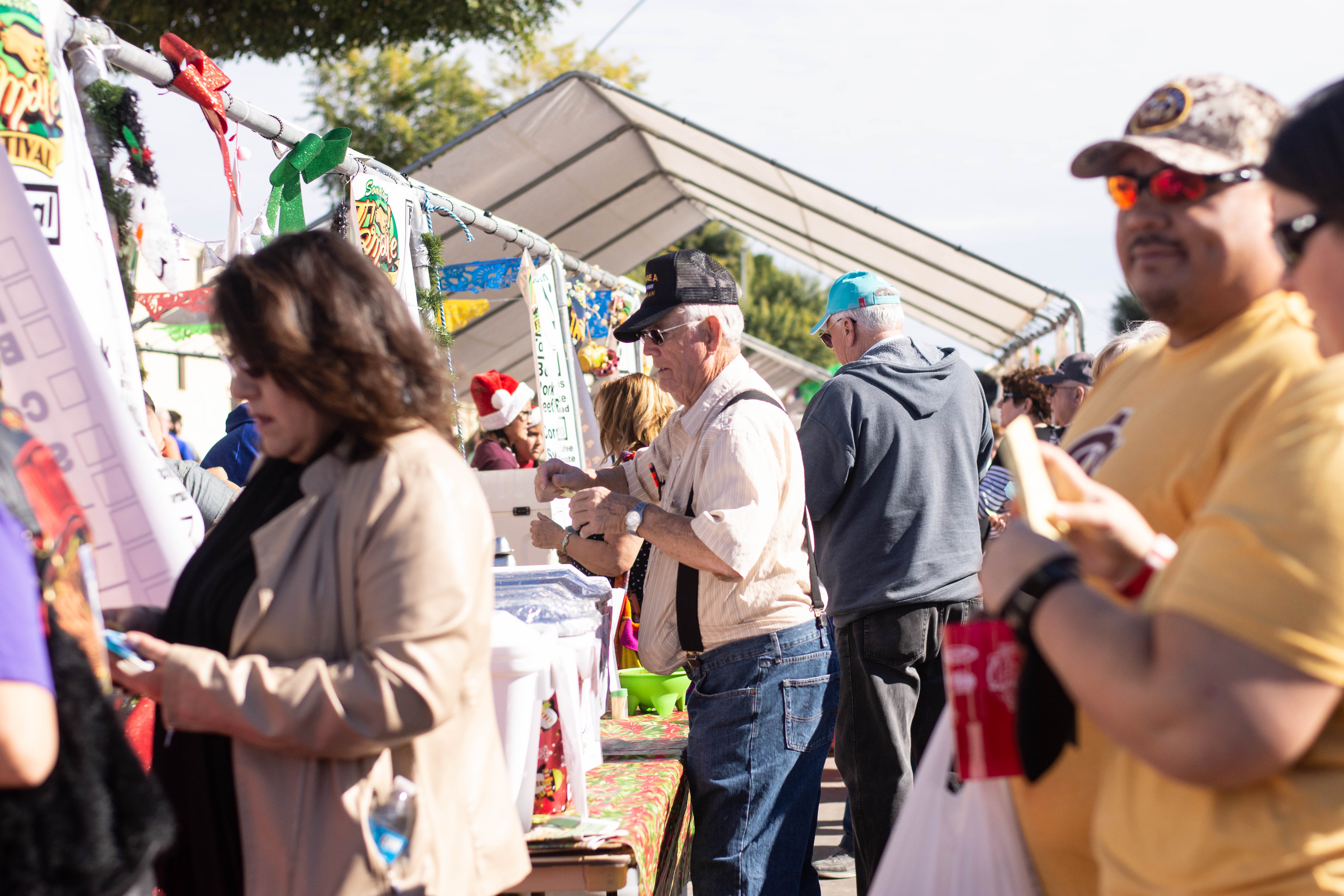
Somerton Tamale Festival

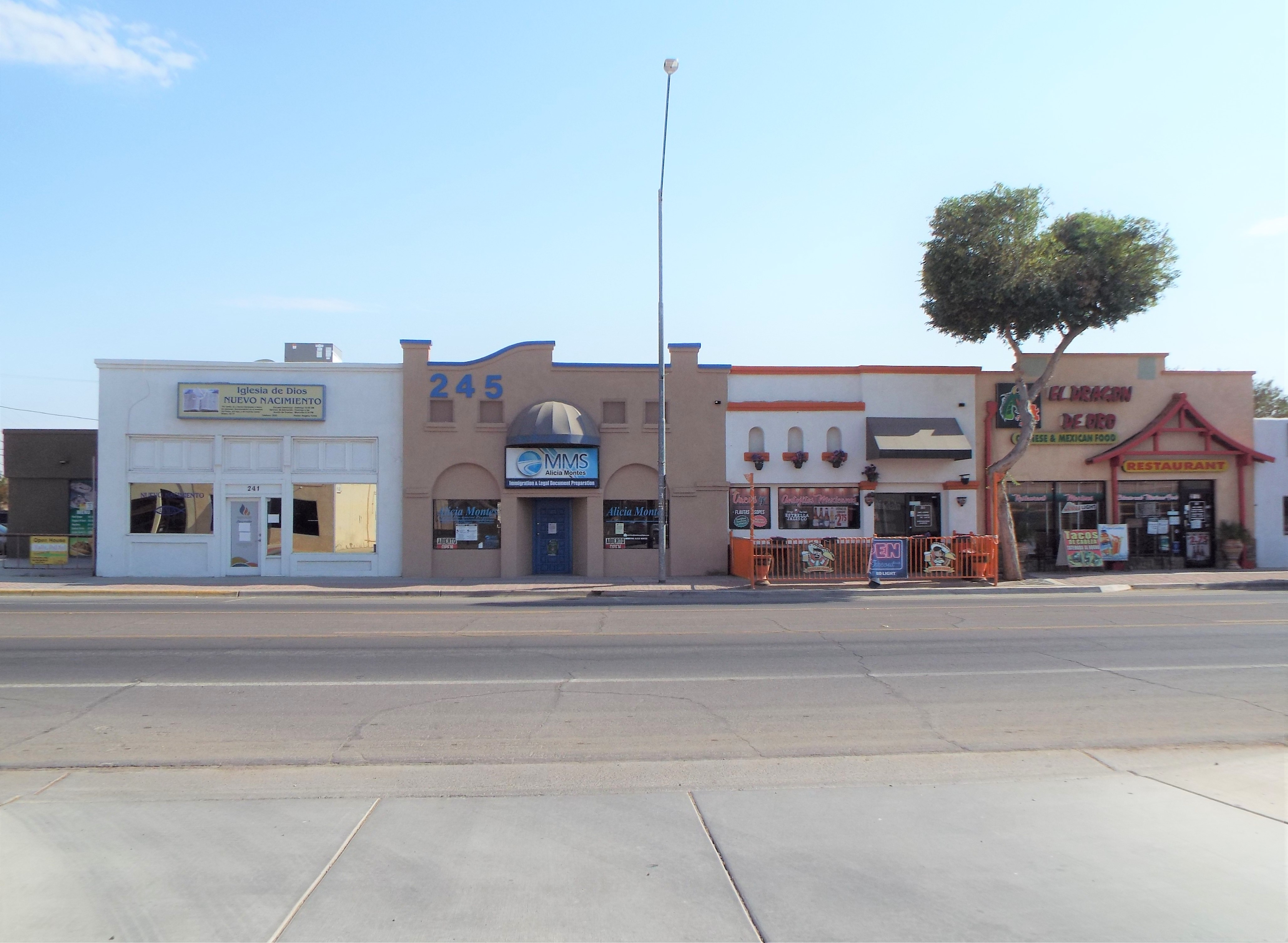
Downtown Somerton

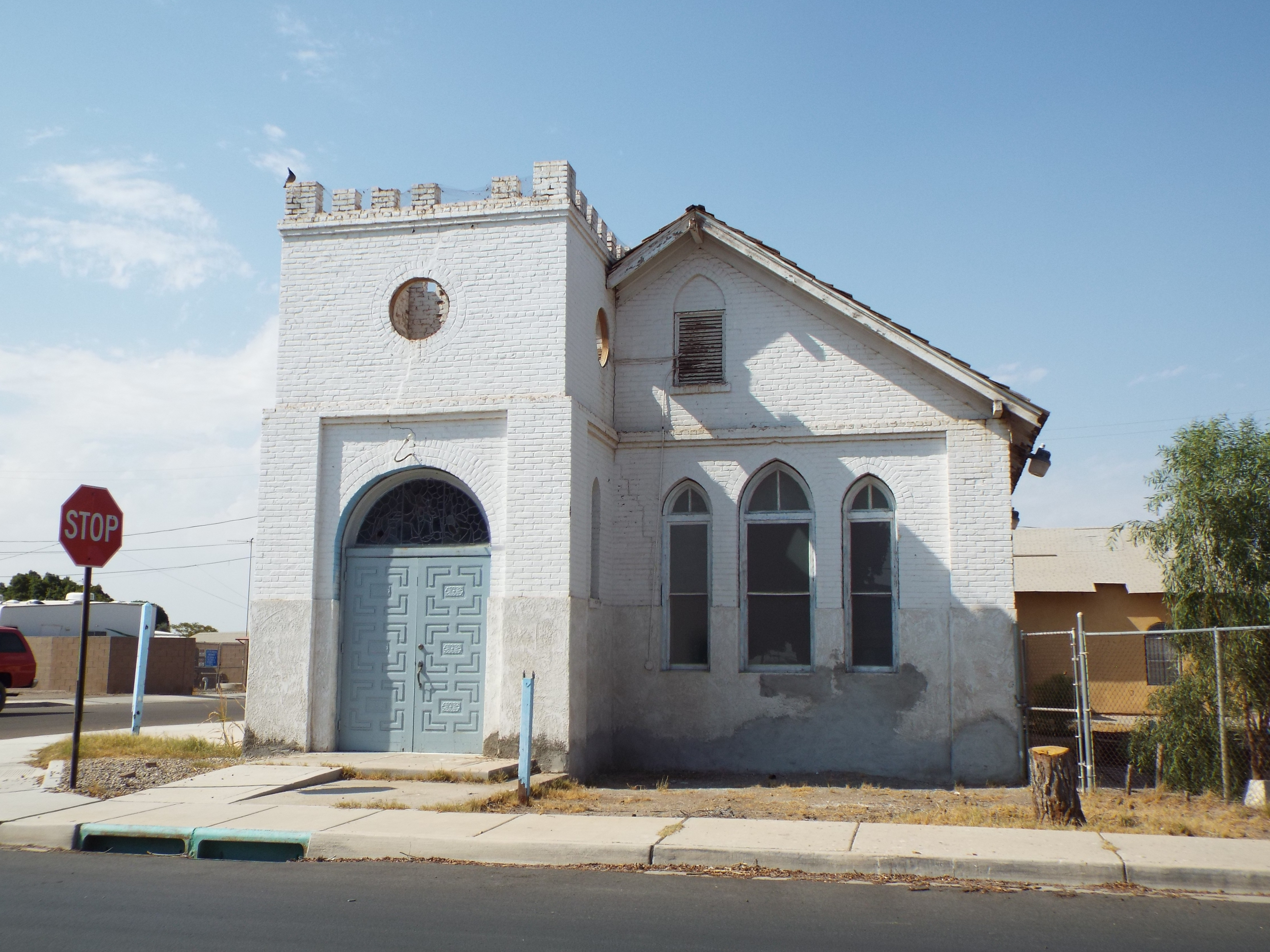
Abandoned Baptist Church built in 1900

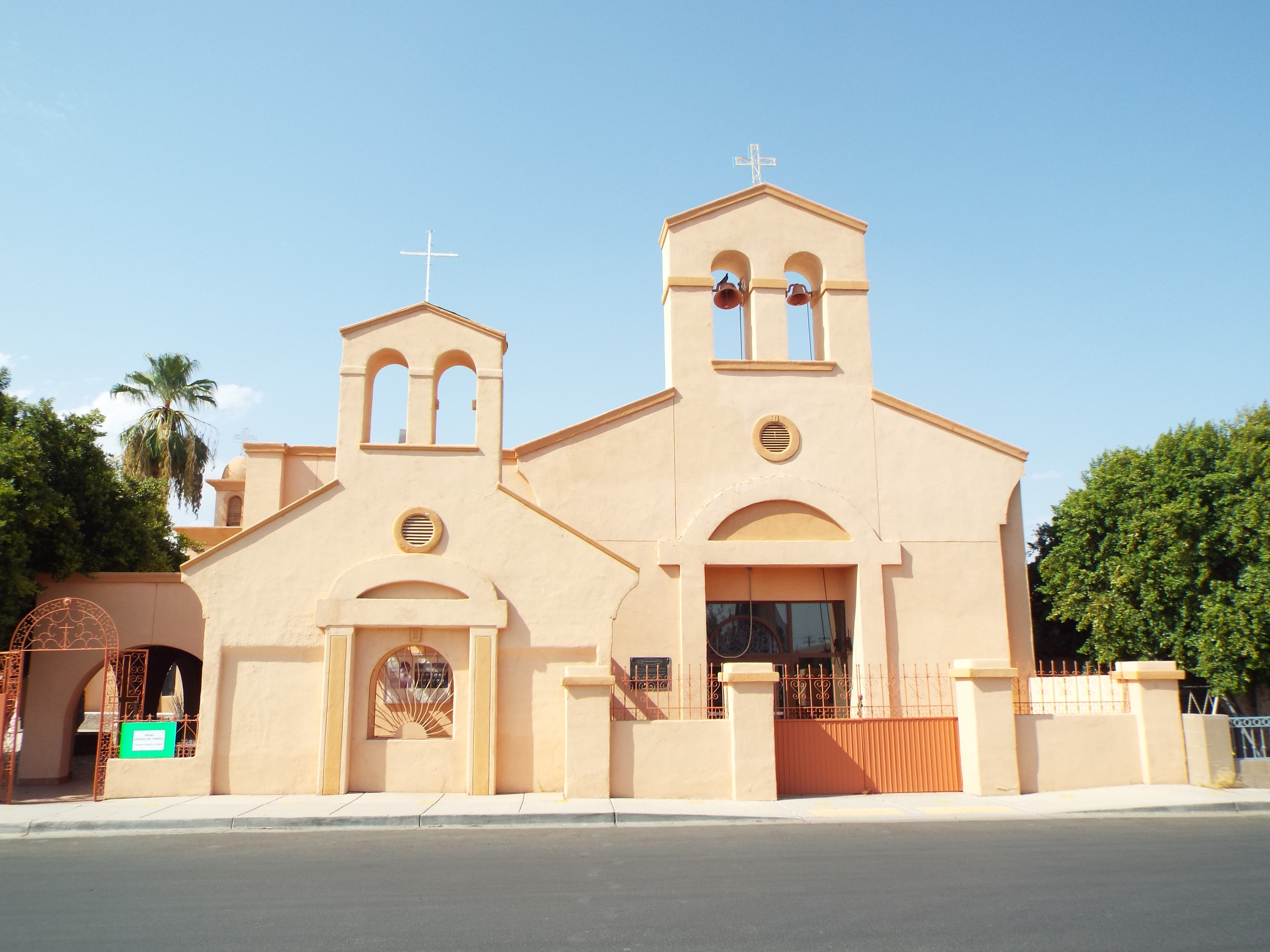
Inmaculado Corazón de María Church before it was repainted in 2023

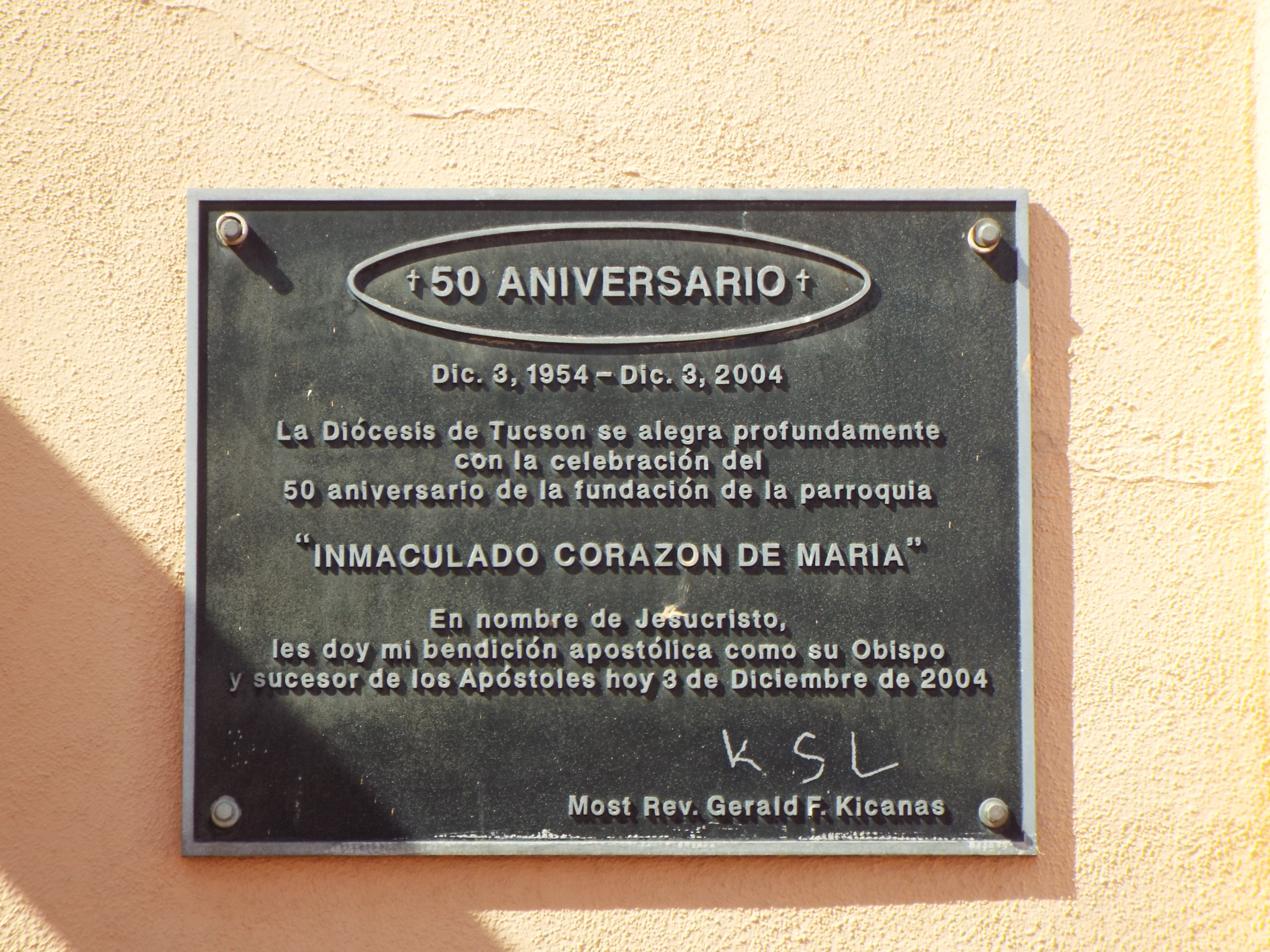
Inmaculado Corazón de María Church marker

Former flag of Somerton, Arizona, which was used until 2020.
