= Kofa High School =

Location
- 3100 S. Avenue A Yuma, Arizona 85364; United States; 32°40′27″N 114°38′08″W

Information
- Type: Public high school
- Established: 1959 (67 years ago)
- School district: Yuma Union High School District
- CEEB code: 030568
- Principal: Joseph Daily
- Staff: 87.00 (FTE)
- Grades: 9–12
- Enrollment: 2,323 (2023-2024)
- Student to teacher ratio: 26.70
- Colors: Crimson and white
- Mascot: Kings
- Website: kofa.yumaunion.org

Kofa High School is a high school in Yuma, Arizona. It is one of seven high schools part of the Yuma Union High School District.

It was the second high school to be established in the community. The school shares its name with the Kofa Mountains, which were named for the King of Arizona gold mine, discovered in King Valley in 1896 and active from 1897 to 1910. The mine used to stamp its property "K of A", and is commonly known as the Kofa Mine. The school draws its mascot, the King, from the mine as well.

Designed in 1959 by the Phoenix architecture firm of Edward L. Varney Associates. It was built by D. O. Norton and Son Construction Co. also of Phoenix. Major renovations were completed on the ageing campus in 2019 designed by DLR Group Architects. As of 2023, Kofa High School is ranked No. 4 in Yuma County.

Liberty Military Housing of Marine Corps Air Station Yuma is assigned to this high school.

== Notable alumni, attendants, and faculty ==
- Cain Velasquez, two-time Arizona State Wrestling Champion; professional mixed martial artist; former UFC Heavyweight champion
- Roger L. Worsley, later a college president and administrator in Texas and Arkansas, taught at Kofa 1959–1962
- Regina Romero, Mayor of Tucson, AZ, 2019–present.
