= Gadsden Elementary School District =

School district in Arizona, United States

Address
- 1350 East Cesar Chavez Boulevard San Luis, Arizona, 85349; United States

District information
- Type: Public
- Grades: PreK–8
- Superintendent: Lizette Esparza
- Budget: $59,036,562
- NCES District ID: 0403240

Students and staff
- Students: 4,931
- Teachers: 151.0
- Staff: 385.17
- Student–teacher ratio: 32.66

Other information
- Website: www.gesd32.org

Gadsden Elementary School District 32 is a public school district in Yuma County, Arizona, headquartered in San Luis. The district serves Gadsden and the western part of San Luis.

== Schools ==
=== Elementary schools (prekindergarten-grade 6) ===
- Arizona Desert Elementary School
- Cesar Chavez Elementary School
- Desert View Elementary School
- Ed Pastor Elementary School
- Gadsden Elementary School
- Rio Colorado Elementary School
- San Luis Preschool

=== Middle schools (grades 7-8) ===
- San Luis Middle School
- Southwest Junior High School
