= Yuma, Arizona =

- City
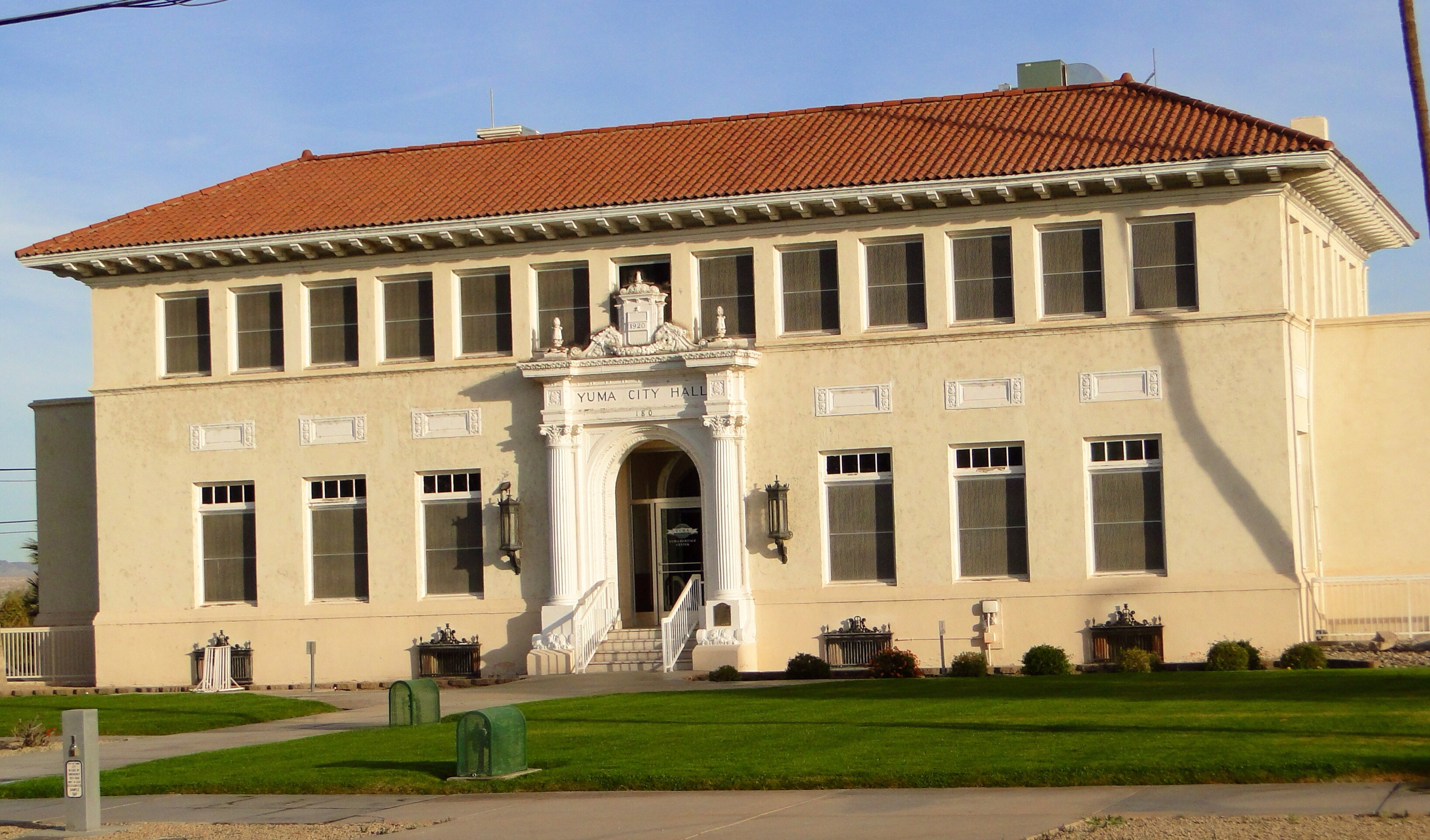
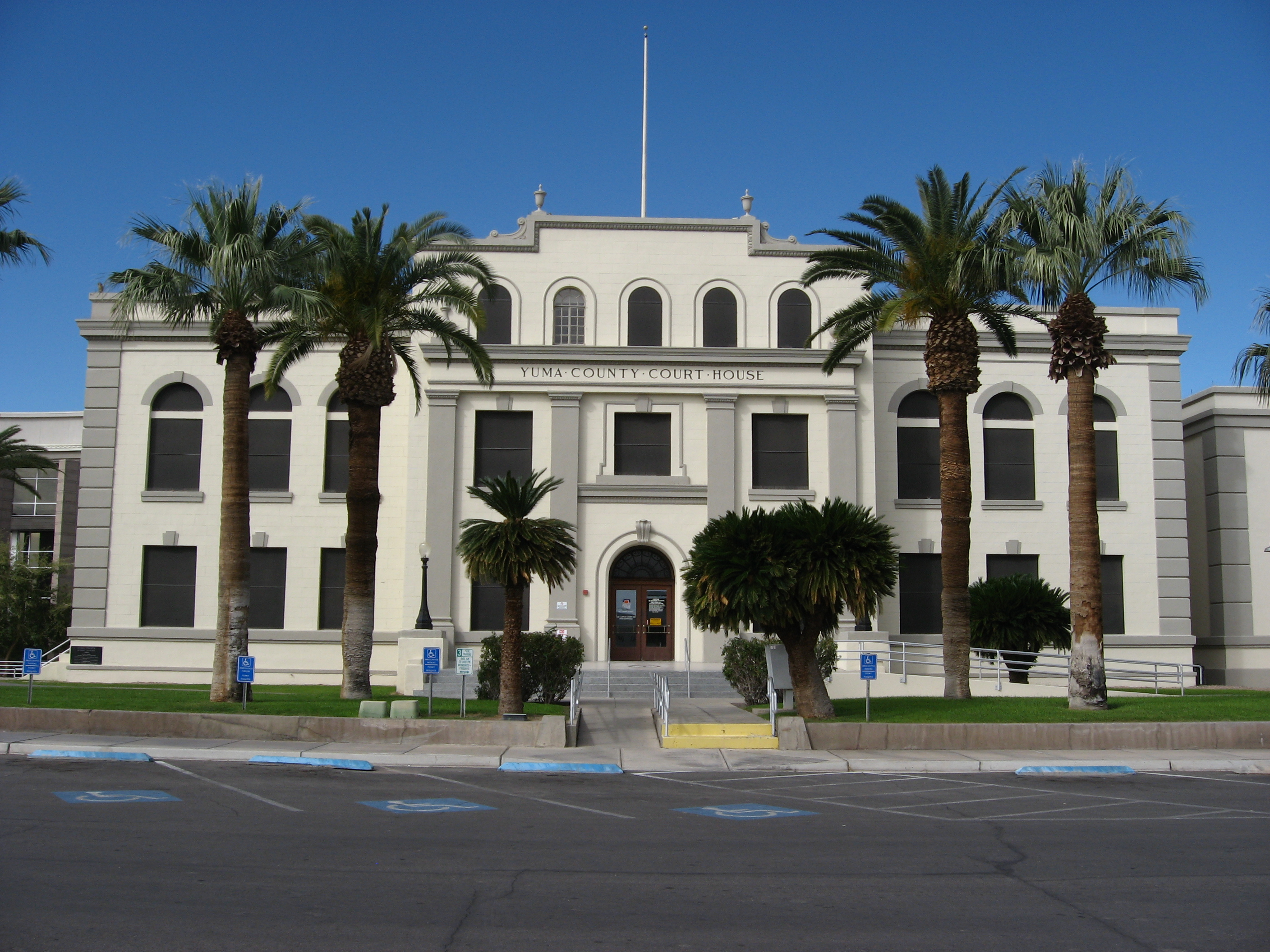
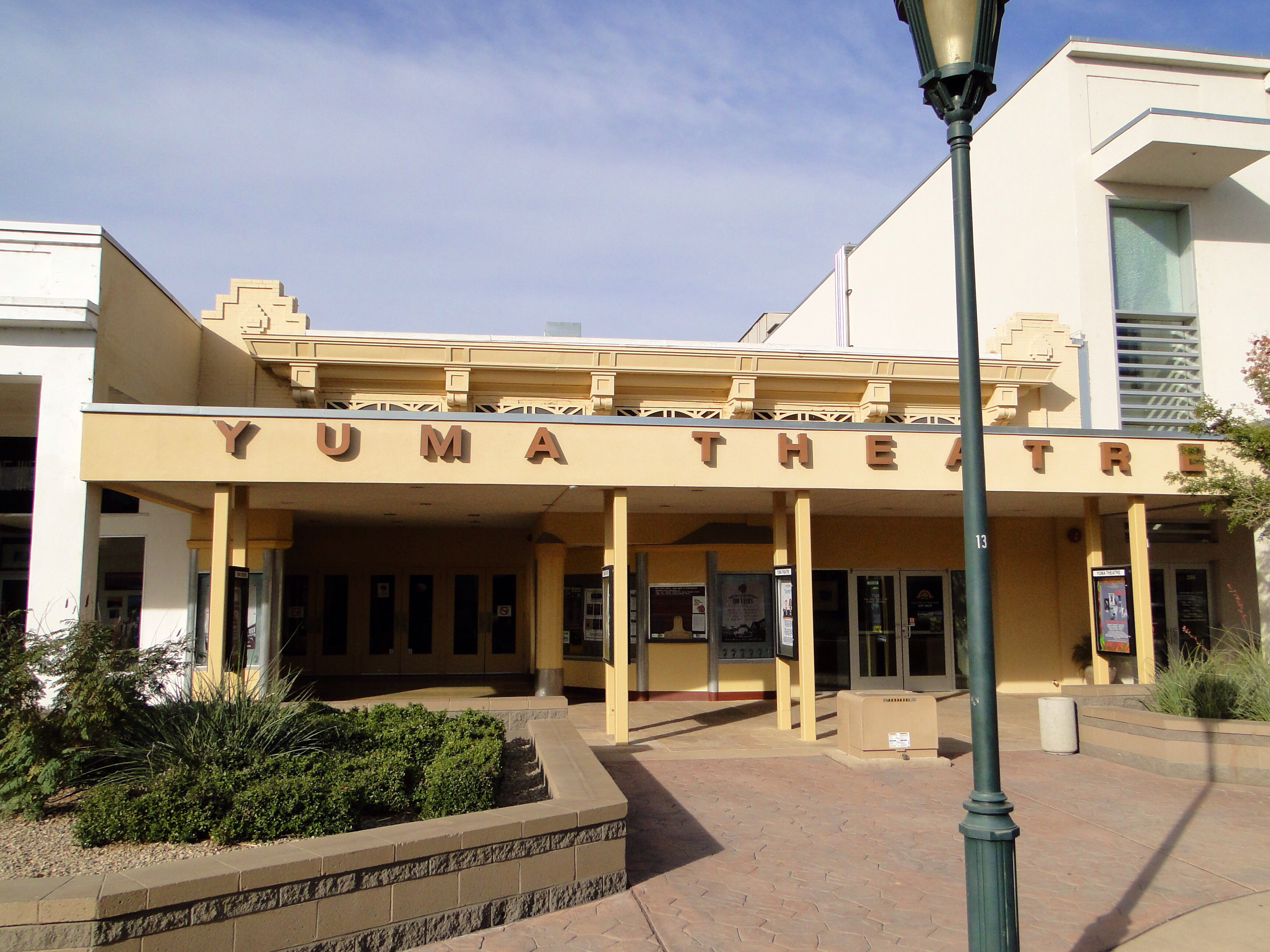
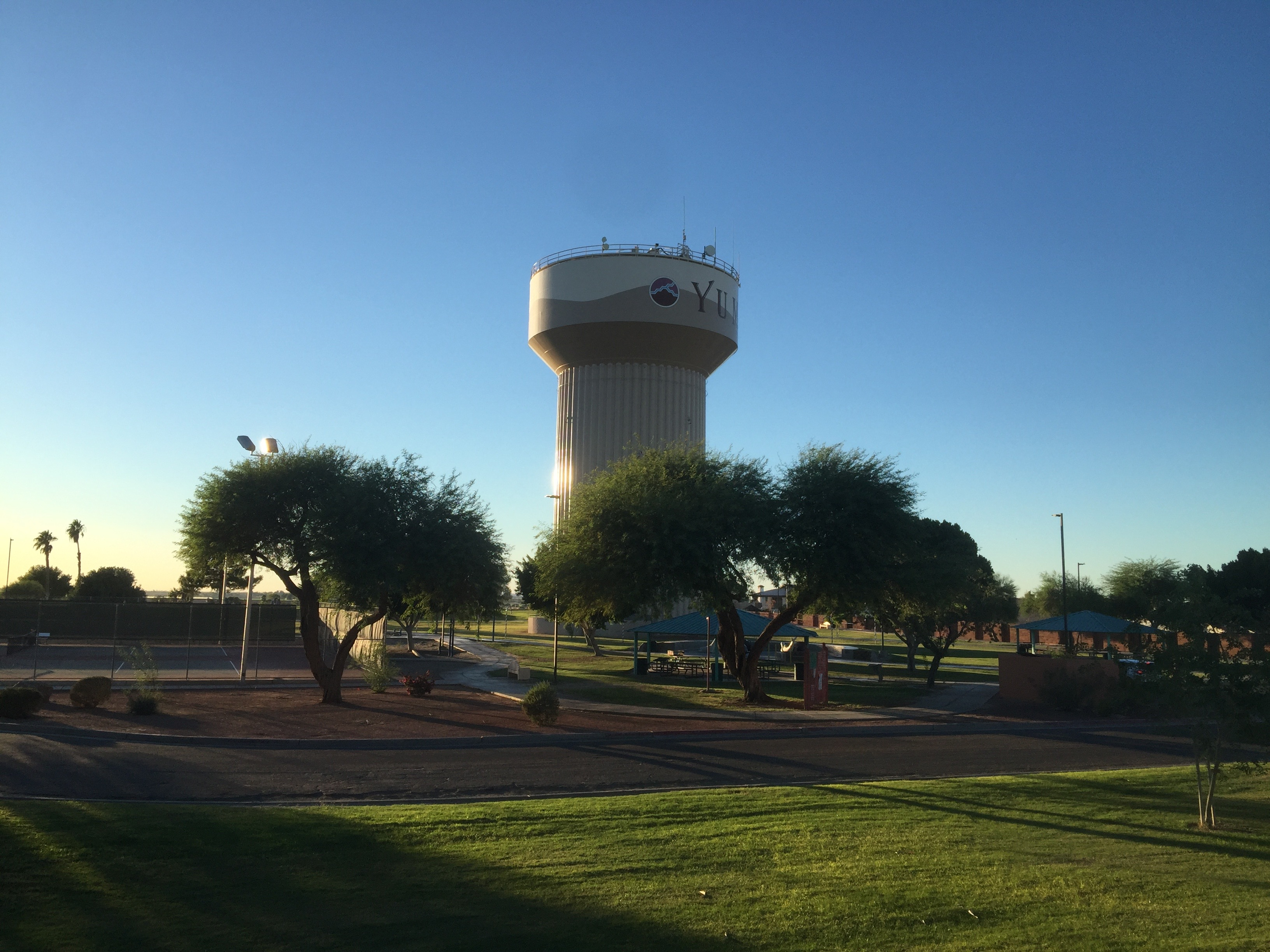
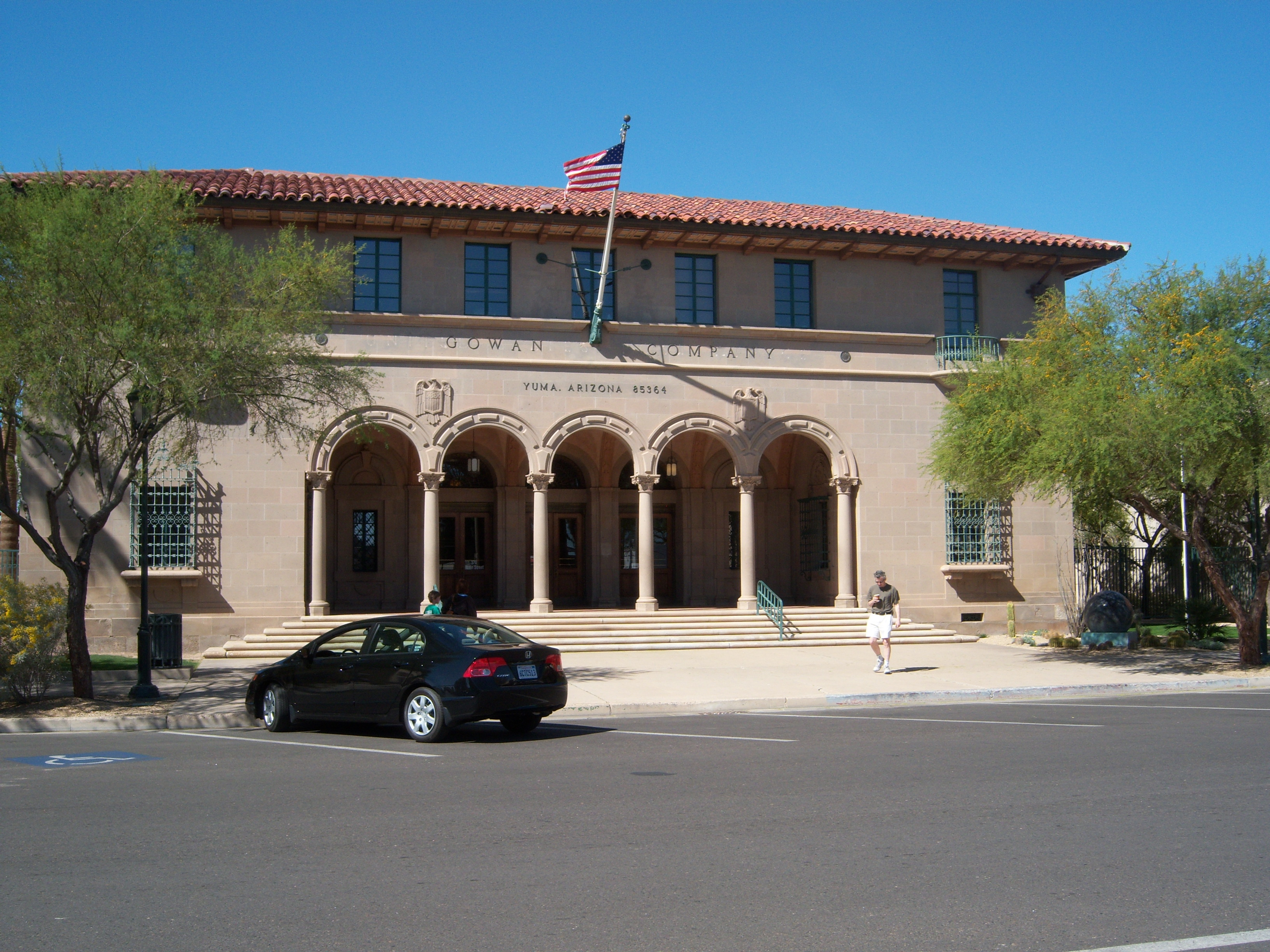
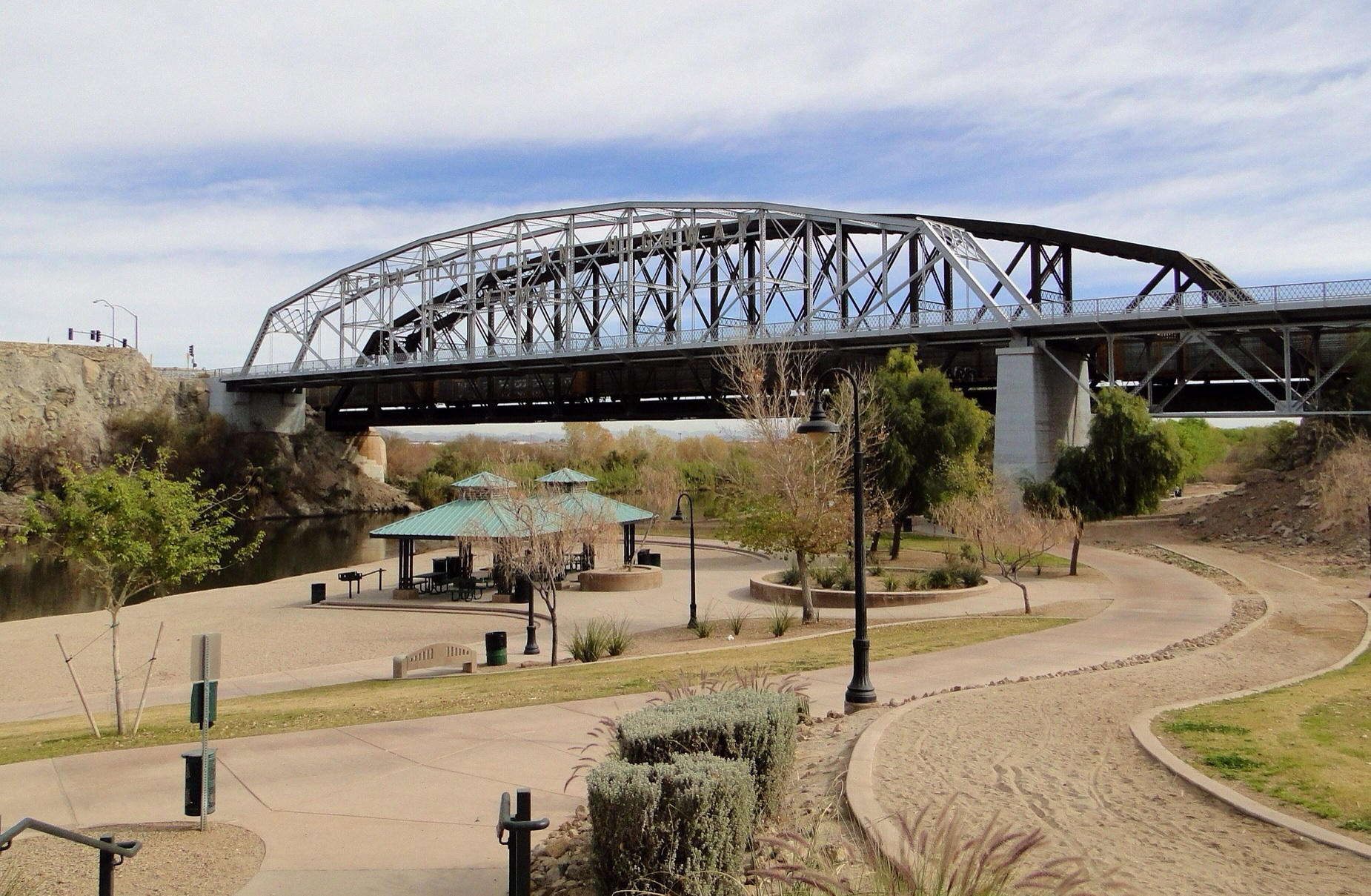
- Clockwise from top: Old Yuma City Hall, Yuma Theatre, Old Yuma Post Office, Ocean to Ocean Bridge, Yuma water tower, Yuma County Courthouse

- Flag Seal

- Location of Yuma in Yuma County, Arizona

- Location in Arizona Location in the United States
- Coordinates: 32°40′00″N 114°34′20″W
- Country: United States
- State: Arizona
- County: Yuma
- Incorporated: 1914

Government
  - Type: Council-Manager
  - Body: Yuma City Council

Area
  - City: 120.84 sq mi (312.97 km^{2})
  - Land: 120.77 sq mi (312.79 km^{2})
  - Water: 0.069 sq mi (0.18 km^{2}) 0.07%
- Elevation: 256 ft (78 m)

Population (2020)
  - City: 95,548
  - Density: 791.2/sq mi (305.47/km^{2})
  - Urban: 135,717 (US: 253rd)
  - Metro: 203,247 (US: 214th)
- Demonym: Yuman
- Time zone: UTC−7 (MST)
- ZIP Codes: 85364–85367, 85369
- Area code: 928
- FIPS code: 04-85540
- GNIS ID: 2412328
- Major airport: Yuma International Airport
- Website: www.yumaaz.gov

Yuma is a city in and the county seat of Yuma County, Arizona, United States. The city's population was 95,548 at the 2020 census, up from the 2010 census population of 93,064.

Yuma is the principal city of the Yuma, Arizona, Metropolitan Statistical Area, which consists of Yuma County. According to the United States Census Bureau, the 2020 estimated population of the Yuma MSA is 203,247. According to Guinness World Records, Yuma is the "Sunniest City on Earth", promising "sunshine and warm weather at least 91% of the year." Anywhere from 70,000 to over 85,000 out-of-state visitors make Yuma their winter residence.

Yuma's weather also makes it an agricultural powerhouse, growing over 175 types of crops, the largest of which is lettuce. Colloquially known by many as "The Winter Lettuce Capital of The World", Yuma County provides 90% of all leafy vegetables grown from November to March in the United States. Yuma is also known for its large military population due to several military bases, including the Marine Corps Air Station.

Yuma is in the state's southwestern corner, in the Sonoran Desert, Yuma Desert sub-region.

== History ==
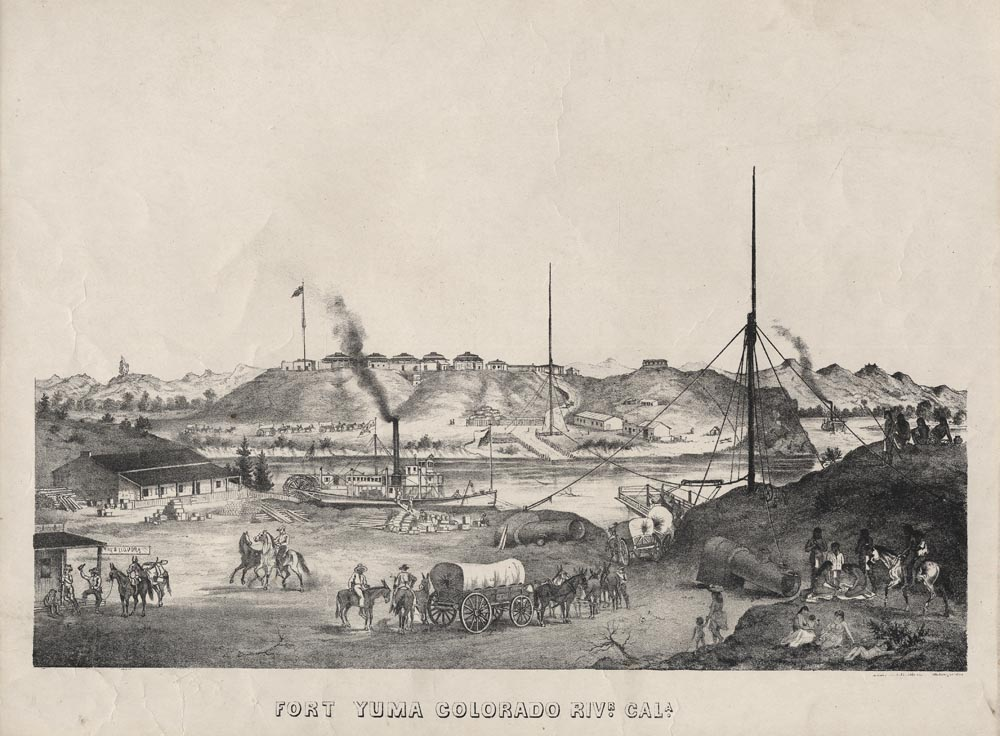
Fort Yuma, California, c. 1875

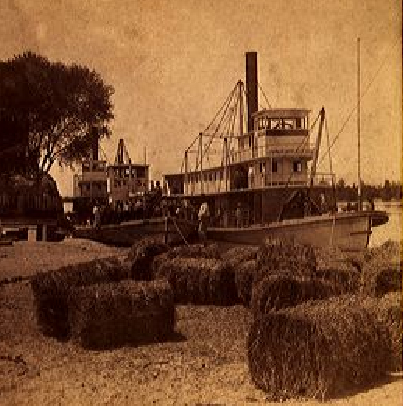
Steamboats on the Colorado River at Yuma, c. 1880

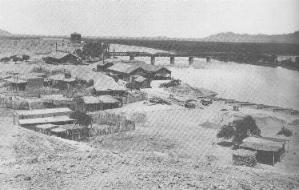
Yuma Crossing in 1886. The railway bridge over the Colorado River was built in 1877.

The area's first inhabitants were Native American cultures and historic tribes. Their descendants now occupy the Cocopah and Quechan reservations.

In 1540, Spanish colonial expeditions under Hernando de Alarcón and Melchior Díaz visited the area and immediately recognized the natural crossing of the Colorado River as an ideal spot for a city. The Colorado River narrows to slightly under 1,000 feet (300 m) wide in one area. Military expeditions that crossed the Colorado River at the Yuma Crossing include Juan Bautista de Anza (1774), the Mormon Battalion (1848) and the California Column (1862).

During and after the California Gold Rush to the late 1870s, the Yuma Crossing was known for its ferry crossings for the Southern Emigrant Trail. This was considered the gateway to California and the "Great Southwest", as it was one of the few natural spots where travelers could cross the otherwise very wide Colorado River.

=== First settlements ===
Following the United States establishing Fort Yuma, two towns developed one mile downriver. The one on the California side was called Jaeger City, named after the owner of Jaeger's Ferry, which crossed the river there. It was for a time the larger of the two, with the Butterfield Overland Mail office and station, two blacksmiths, a hotel, two stores, and other dwellings.

The other was called Colorado City. Developed on the south side of the river in what is now Arizona by speculator Charles Poston, it was the site of the custom house. When started, it was just north of the border between Mexican-ruled Sonora, Mexico and California. After the Gadsden Purchase by the United States, the town bordered on the Territory of New Mexico. This area was designated as the Territory of Arizona in 1863. The Colorado City site at the time was duly registered in San Diego; both banks of the Colorado River just below its confluence with the Gila were recognized as being within the jurisdiction of California. The county of San Diego collected taxes from there for many years.

From 1853 a smaller settlement, Arizona City, grew up on the high ground across from the fort and was organized under the name of its post office in 1858. It had adobe dwellings, two stores and two saloons. Colorado City and Jaeger City were almost completely destroyed by the Great Flood of 1862 and had to be rebuilt on higher ground. At that time Colorado City became part of Arizona City, later on taking the name Yuma in 1873.

=== Early development ===
From 1854, Colorado City was the major steamboat stop for traffic up and down the Colorado River. After the 1862 flood, it became part of Arizona City. The steamboats transported passengers and equipment for the various mines and military outposts along the Colorado; Colorado City was the terminus of wagon traffic up the Gila River into New Mexico Territory. They offloaded the cargo from ships at the mouth of the Colorado River at Robinson's Landing and from 1864 at Port Isabel. From 1864, the Yuma Quartermaster Depot, today a state historic park, supplied all forts in present-day Arizona, as well as large parts of Colorado and New Mexico. After Arizona became a separate territory, Yuma became the county seat for Yuma County in 1871, replacing La Paz, the first seat.

The Southern Pacific Railroad bridged the river in 1877, and acquired George Alonzo Johnson's Colorado Steam Navigation Company, the only steamboat company on the river. Yuma became the new base of navigation on the river, ending the need for Port Isabel, which was abandoned in 1879. The warehouses and shipyard there were moved to Yuma.

== Geography ==
Yuma is near the borders of California to the west and Mexico to the south, and just west of the Gila River's confluence with the Colorado. The city is approximately 60 miles (100 km) from the Gulf of California (Sea of Cortez), a branch of the Pacific.

According to the United States Census Bureau, the city has a total area of 106.7 square miles (276 km^{2}), of which 106.6 square miles (276 km^{2}) is land and 0.1 square miles (0.26 km^{2}) (0.07%) is water.

=== Climate ===
Yuma is noted for its weather extremes. Of any populated place in the contiguous United States, Yuma is the driest, the sunniest, and the least humid, has the lowest frequency of precipitation, and has the highest number of sunny days per year—175—with a daily maximum temperature of 90 °F (32 °C) or higher.

Yuma features a hot desert climate (Köppen climate classification BWh), with extremely hot summers and warm winters. Atmospheric humidity is usually very low, except during what are called "Gulf surges", when a maritime tropical air mass from the Gulf of California is drawn northward, usually in connection with the summer monsoon or the passage of a tropical storm to the south.

The sun is said to shine during about 90% of the daylight hours, making Yuma one of the sunniest places in the world. The city receives the most recorded mean sunshine of anywhere on Earth, although the equipment used by the United States tends to provide higher sunshine estimates than the traditional Campbell–Stokes recorder.

On average, Yuma receives 3.36 inches (85 mm) of rain annually. Even in the wettest year of 2005, only 7.39 in (188 mm) fell. The driest year at Yuma Airport was 2007, with only 0.15 in (3.8 mm) recorded. On average, the wettest months of the year are during the monsoon months of August and September, and December, when moisture from winter storms arrives from the Pacific Ocean. June is the driest month, with drought virtually absolute.

In 1995, Yuma recorded its all-time high temperature of 124 °F (51 °C). The lowest recorded temperature was in the Yuma-Mesa area in January 2007. The temperature fell to 21 °F (−6 °C) for approximately two hours, harming many crops grown in and around Yuma. Citrus suffered the most, particularly the lemon crop. According to an Arizona Department of Agriculture report in February 2007, there was a 75% to 95% loss of crop and trees. On average (according to the 1991–2020 climate period), the temperature reaches freezing point in one year in fifteen, and there are 117 days per year during which the temperature reaches or exceeds 100 °F (38 °C), usually from April through October. During July and August, the temperature fails to reach 100 °F (38 °C) on only one and two days on average, respectively.

In 1997, the desert city sustained a full tropical storm after Hurricane Nora made landfall at the mouth of the Colorado River and quickly moved due north along it. This rare event cut power to 12,000 customers in Yuma, and dropped 3.59 inches (91 mm) of rain at Marine Corps Air Station Yuma. The last time a hurricane had hit near Yuma was in mid-August 1977, when similar rainfalls were recorded.

Climate data for Yuma, Arizona (1991–2020 normals, (Note: Mean monthly maxima and minima (i.e. the highest and lowest temperature readings during an entire month or year) calculated based on data at said location from 1991 to 2020.) sunshine 1981–2010, extremes 1878–present)
Month	Jan	Feb	Mar	Apr	May	Jun	Jul	Aug	Sep	Oct	Nov	Dec	Year
Record high °F (°C)	88 (31)	97 (36)	109 (43)	107 (42)	120 (49)	122 (50)	124 (51)	120 (49)	123 (51)	113 (45)	98 (37)	86 (30)	124 (51)
Mean maximum °F (°C)	79.5 (26.4)	84.1 (28.9)	92.8 (33.8)	100.3 (37.9)	106.2 (41.2)	112.9 (44.9)	115.0 (46.1)	114.4 (45.8)	110.6 (43.7)	102.2 (39.0)	89.5 (31.9)	78.0 (25.6)	116.6 (47.0)
Mean daily maximum °F (°C)	69.8 (21.0)	73.4 (23.0)	80.2 (26.8)	86.4 (30.2)	94.3 (34.6)	103.3 (39.6)	106.7 (41.5)	106.4 (41.3)	101.4 (38.6)	90.2 (32.3)	77.7 (25.4)	67.8 (19.9)	88.1 (31.2)
Daily mean °F (°C)	58.8 (14.9)	61.9 (16.6)	67.6 (19.8)	73.1 (22.8)	80.6 (27.0)	89.1 (31.7)	94.6 (34.8)	94.8 (34.9)	89.5 (31.9)	78.0 (25.6)	66.1 (18.9)	57.3 (14.1)	76.0 (24.4)
Mean daily minimum °F (°C)	47.9 (8.8)	50.4 (10.2)	55.0 (12.8)	60.8 (16.0)	66.9 (19.4)	75.0 (23.9)	82.6 (28.1)	83.2 (28.4)	77.6 (25.3)	65.7 (18.7)	54.4 (12.4)	46.8 (8.2)	63.8 (17.7)
Mean minimum °F (°C)	38.1 (3.4)	40.8 (4.9)	44.7 (7.1)	49.6 (9.8)	56.8 (13.8)	65.1 (18.4)	75.2 (24.0)	75.0 (23.9)	66.9 (19.4)	54.6 (12.6)	44.1 (6.7)	37.2 (2.9)	35.6 (2.0)
Record low °F (°C)	22 (−6)	25 (−4)	31 (−1)	38 (3)	39 (4)	50 (10)	61 (16)	58 (14)	50 (10)	35 (2)	29 (−2)	22 (−6)	22 (−6)
Average precipitation inches (mm)	0.39 (9.9)	0.38 (9.7)	0.39 (9.9)	0.14 (3.6)	0.06 (1.5)	0.01 (0.25)	0.24 (6.1)	0.20 (5.1)	0.68 (17)	0.13 (3.3)	0.23 (5.8)	0.43 (11)	3.28 (83)
Average precipitation days (≥ 0.01 in)	2.6	2.3	1.9	0.8	0.5	0.1	1.2	1.4	1.5	1.0	1.0	2.3	16.6
Mean monthly sunshine hours	268.4	270.8	335.5	365.5	407.4	415.4	392.6	375.6	341.7	319.6	270.1	252.7	4,015.3
Percentage possible sunshine	84	88	90	94	95	97	90	91	92	91	86	81	90
Average ultraviolet index	3	5	7	8	10	10	11	10	9	6	4	3	7
Source 1: NOAA
Source 2: Weather Atlas

Snow in Yuma has only been recorded on December 12, 1932, when a light coating of snow covered the city for the first and only time in its history. A few flakes fell in January 1937 and December 1967, mixed with rain.

== Demographics ==
Historical population
Census	Pop.	Note	%±
1860	130		—
1870	1,144		780.0%
1880	1,200		4.9%
1890	1,773		47.8%
1900	1,519		−14.3%
1910	2,914		91.8%
1920	4,237		45.4%
1930	4,892		15.5%
1940	5,325		8.9%
1950	9,145		71.7%
1960	23,974		162.2%
1970	29,007		21.0%
1980	42,481		46.5%
1990	54,923		29.3%
2000	77,515		41.1%
2010	93,064		20.1%
2020	95,548		2.7%
2023 (est.)	100,858	▲	5.6%
U.S. Decennial Census

Yuma first appeared on the 1860 U.S. Census as the village of "Arizonia" (Arizona City) in what was then Arizona County, New Mexico Territory (see Arizona City (Yuma, Arizona) for details). It returned as Arizona City in 1870 and then became Yuma in 1873. On April 12, 1902, the village of Yuma was incorporated as a town. It formally incorporated as a city on April 7, 1914.

=== Racial and ethnic composition ===
Yuma, Arizona – Racial and ethnic composition Note: the US Census treats Hispanic/Latino as an ethnic category. This table excludes Latinos from the racial categories and assigns them to a separate category. Hispanics/Latinos may be of any race.
Race / Ethnicity (NH = Non-Hispanic)	Pop 2000	Pop 2010	Pop 2020	% 2000	% 2010	% 2020
White (NH)	36,784	35,306	29,815	47.45%	37.94%	31.20%
Black or African American (NH)	2,220	2,532	2,069	2.86%	2.72%	2.17%
Native American or Alaska Native (NH)	747	992	843	0.96%	1.07%	0.88%
Asian (NH)	1,086	1,561	1,786	1.40%	1.68%	1.87%
Pacific Islander or Native Hawaiian (NH)	105	143	135	0.14%	0.15%	0.14%
Some other race (NH)	100	136	362	0.13%	0.15%	0.38%
Mixed race or Multiracial (NH)	1,073	1,361	2,318	1.38%	1.46%	2.43%
Hispanic or Latino (any race)	35,400	51,033	58,220	45.67%	54.84%	60.93%
Total	77,515	93,064	95,548	100.00%	100.00%	100.00%

=== 2022 American Community Survey ===
As of the 2022 American Community Survey estimates, there were 98,517 people and 39,210 households. The population density was 813.9 inhabitants per square mile (314.2/km^{2}). There were 45,408 housing units at an average density of 375.2 per square mile (144.9/km^{2}). The racial makeup of the city was 39.7% White, 27.9% some other race, 2.4% Black or African American, 1.5% Asian, and 0.8% Native American or Alaskan Native, with 27.7% from two or more races. Hispanics or Latinos of any race were 66.5% of the population.

Of the 39,210 households, 37.8% had children under the age of 18 living with them, 32.2% had seniors 65 years or older living with them, 48.2% were married couples living together, 6.8% were couples cohabitating, 17.4% had a male householder with no partner present, and 27.6% had a female householder with no partner present. The median household size was 2.45 and the median family size was 2.96.

The age distribution was 26.3% under 18, 12.9% from 18 to 24, 26.5% from 25 to 44, 16.7% from 45 to 64, and 17.7% who were 65 or older. The median age was 33.6 years.

The median income for a household was $58,043, with family households having a median income of $65,926 and non-family households $32,347. The per capita income was $31,467. Out of the 96,149 people with a determined poverty status, 9.8% were below the poverty line. Further, 10.5% of minors and 11.6% of seniors were below the poverty line.

In the survey, residents self-identified with various ethnic ancestries. People of English descent made up 5.6% of the population of the town, followed by German at 5.0%, American at 3.4%, Irish at 3.1%, Sub-Saharan African at 1.4%, Swedish at 1.4%, Italian at 1.3%, French at 0.9%, Norwegian at 0.7%, Scottish at 0.6%, and Scotch-Irish at 0.5%.

=== 2020 census ===
As of the 2020 census, Yuma had a population of 95,548. The median age was 34.5 years. 26.3% of residents were under the age of 18 and 16.1% of residents were 65 years of age or older. For every 100 females there were 96.3 males, and for every 100 females age 18 and over there were 93.5 males age 18 and over.

98.8% of residents lived in urban areas, while 1.2% lived in rural areas.

There were 33,582 households in Yuma, of which 37.7% had children under the age of 18 living in them. Of all households, 49.0% were married-couple households, 17.2% were households with a male householder and no spouse or partner present, and 26.7% were households with a female householder and no spouse or partner present. About 23.7% of all households were made up of individuals and 11.1% had someone living alone who was 65 years of age or older.

There were 41,496 housing units, of which 19.1% were vacant. The homeowner vacancy rate was 2.0% and the rental vacancy rate was 11.5%.

Racial composition as of the 2020 census
Race	Number	Percent
White	44,367	46.4%
Black or African American	2,443	2.6%
American Indian and Alaska Native	1,683	1.8%
Asian	1,978	2.1%
Native Hawaiian and Other Pacific Islander	180	0.2%
Some other race	22,078	23.1%
Two or more races	22,819	23.9%
Hispanic or Latino (of any race)	58,220	60.9%

=== 2010 census ===
As of the 2010 census, there were 93,064 people. There were 38,626 housing units in Yuma city, 79.5% of which were occupied housing units. The racial makeup of the city was 37.9% White, 2.7% Black or African American, 1.1% Native American, 1.7% Asian, 0.2% Pacific Islander, and 1.6% from two or more races. 54.8% of the population were Hispanic or Latino of any race.

=== 2000 census ===
As of the 2000 census, there were 77,515 people, 26,649 households, and 19,613 families residing in the city. The population density was 726.8 inhabitants per square mile (280.6/km^{2}). There were 34,475 housing units at an average density of 323.3 per square mile (124.8/km^{2}). The racial makeup of the city was 47.5% White, 2.9% Black or African American, 1.0% Native American, 1.4% Asian, 0.1% Pacific Islander, 0.1% from other races, and 1.4% from two or more races. 45.7% of the population were Hispanic or Latino of any race.

There were 26,649 households, out of which 38.8% had children under the age of 18 living with them, 56.6% were married couples living together, 13.1% had a female householder with no husband present, and 26.4% were non-families. 21.7% of all households were made up of individuals, and 9.8% had someone living alone who was 65 years of age or older. The average household size was 2.79 and the average family size was 3.27.

In the city, the population was spread out, with 29.6% under the age of 18, 11.9% from 18 to 24, 27.1% from 25 to 44, 17.5% from 45 to 64, and 13.9% who were 65 years of age or older. The median age was 31 years. For every 100 females, there were 99.1 males. For every 100 females age 18 and over, there were 97.2 males.

According to the 2006 American Community Survey estimate, the median income for a household in the city was $39,885, and the median income for a family was $41,588. Males had a median income of $35,440 versus $27,035 for females. The per capita income for the city was $18,393. About 14.1% of families and 16.9% of the population were below the poverty line, including 23.4% of those under age 18 and 13.9% of those age 65 or over.

High unemployment remains an issue in Yuma. Citing April 2014 data, the Bureau of Labor Statistics ranked Yuma as having the highest unemployment rate in the United States at 23.8 percent, above the 21.6 percent in El Centro, California. Yuma's agricultural workforce, which adjusts to the picking season, is cited by the Arizona Department of Commerce as the reason for the apparent high unemployment.

== Economy ==
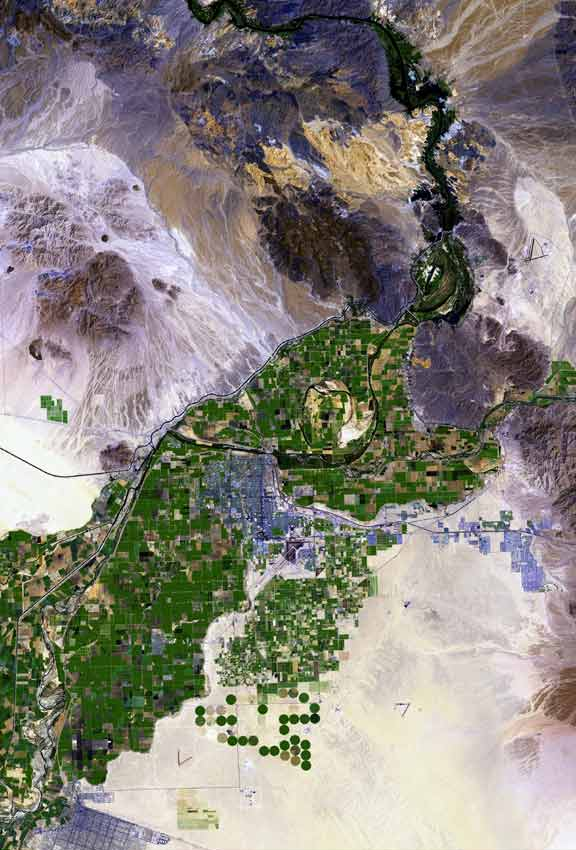
An aerial photo showing how the area around Yuma is highly agricultural in nature

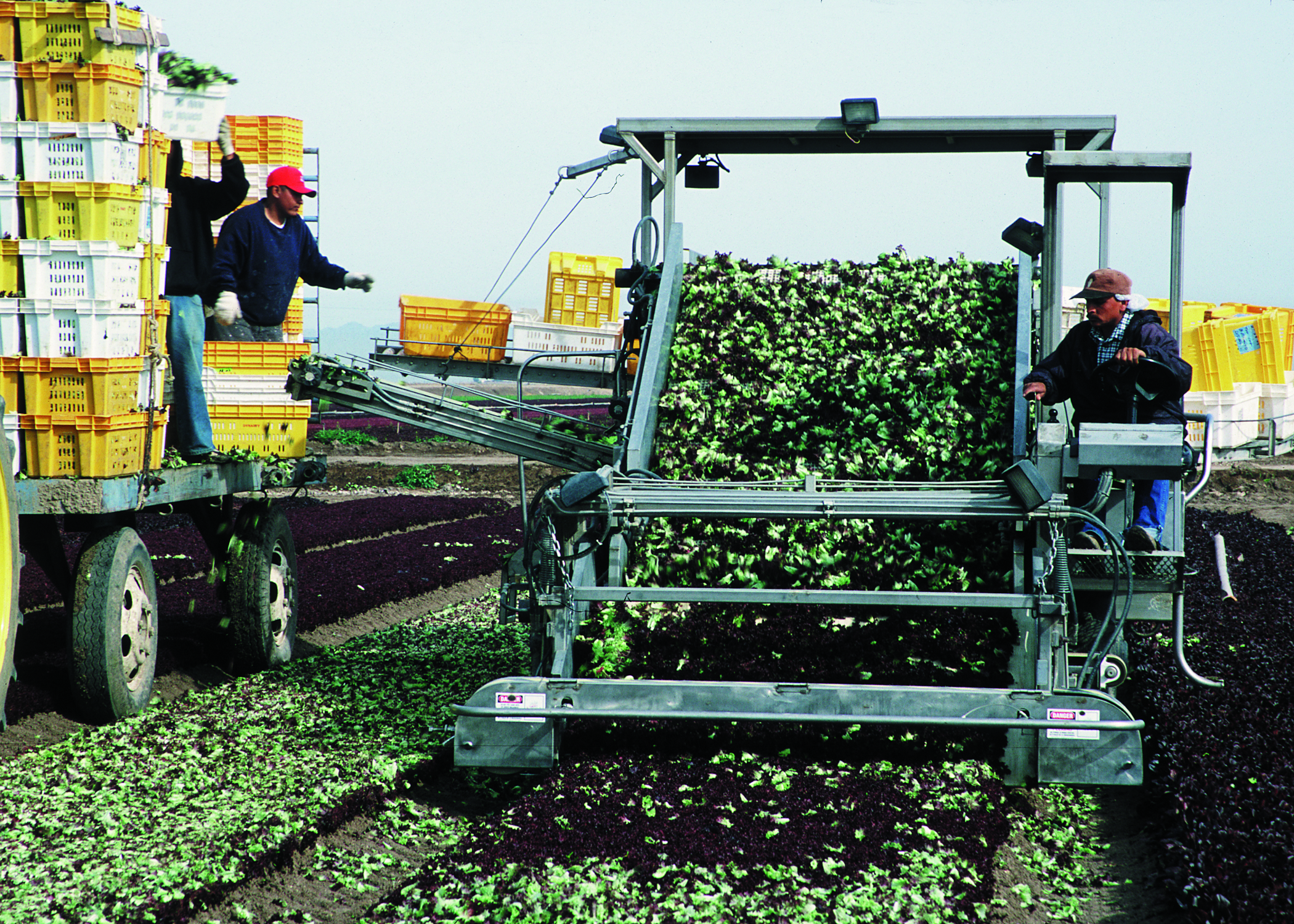
Farming near Yuma in 2011

The Yuma Metropolitan Statistical Area has the highest unemployment rate in the United States as of 2018 at 20.9%. A large percentage of the work force is employed seasonally in agriculture, contributing to apparent unemployment.

Yuma is colloquially referred to as the "Winter Lettuce Capital of the World".

=== Top employers ===
According to the city's 2019 Comprehensive Annual Financial Report, the top employers in the Yuma Metropolitan Statistical Area in 2018 were:

#	Employer	# of employees
1	Marine Corps Air Station Yuma	5,568
2	Yuma Union High School District	3,100
3	U.S. Army Yuma Proving Ground	2,382
4	Yuma Regional Medical Center	2,300
5	Yuma County	1,437
6	Yuma Elementary School District	1,400
7	City of Yuma	1,274
8	TRAX	1,125
9	United States Border Patrol	1,000
10	Arizona Western College	987

Other large employers include Bose, Dole Fresh Vegetables and Shaw Industries.

== Arts and culture ==
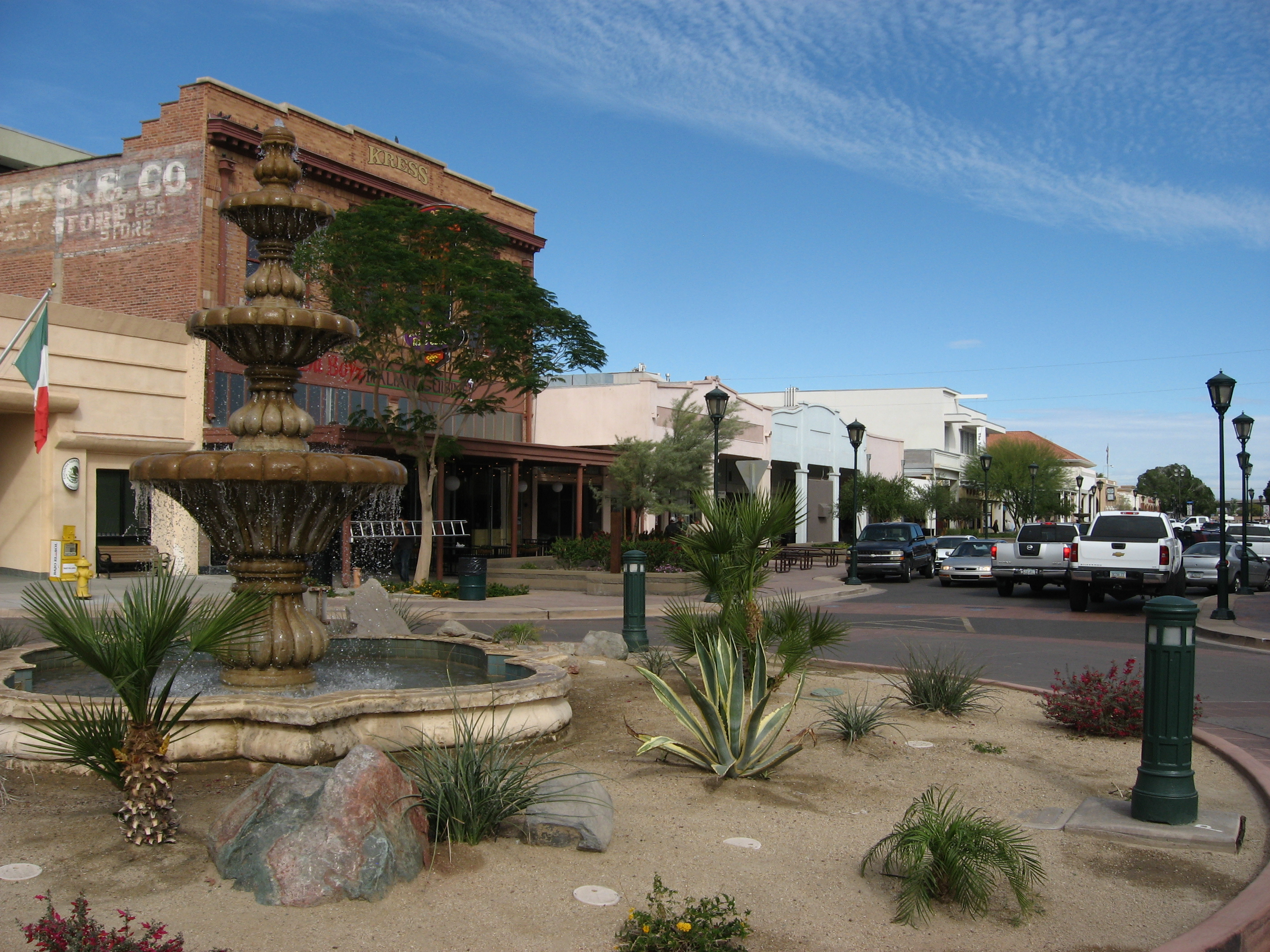
Downtown Yuma with a Mexican Consulate on the left

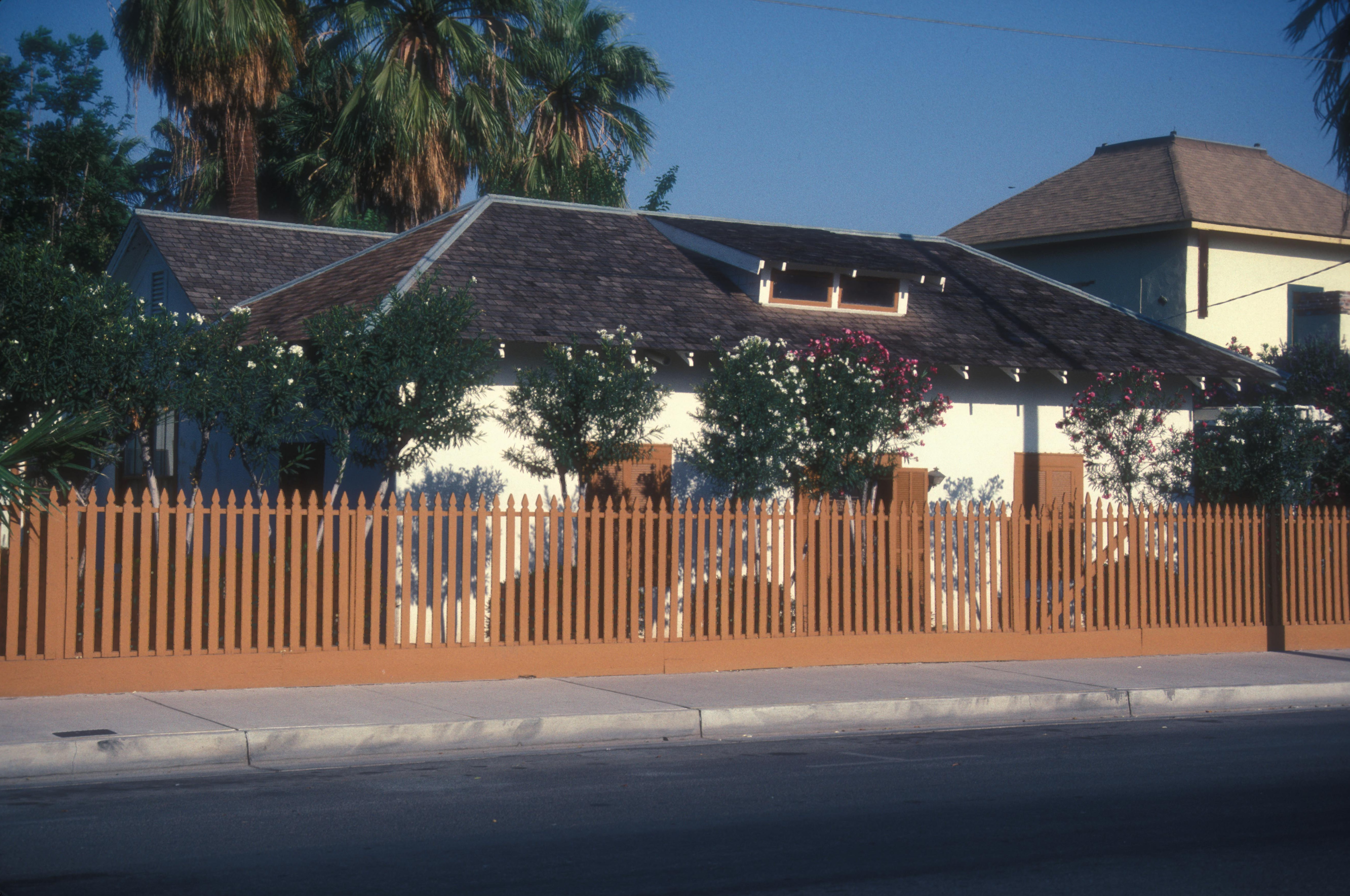
E.F. Sanguinetti Home, a museum run by the Arizona Historical Society

Yuma contains the historical Yuma Territorial Prison, the Yuma Quartermaster Depot State Historic Park (formerly known as the Yuma Crossing Historic Park), and a historic downtown area. Yuma is an Arizona Main Street City. Because of budget cutbacks at the state level, Arizona State Parks no longer operates the Territorial Prison and Quartermaster Depot. They are now operated by the Yuma Crossing National Heritage Area and the City of Yuma. The Yuma Visitors' Bureau oversees the Welcome Center at the Quartermaster Depot and is the official visitors' center for the Yuma Community.

Near Yuma are the Kofa Mountain Range and wildlife refuge, Martinez and Mittry Lakes, and the Algodones Dunes.

The city is the location of the Marine Corps Air Station Yuma, which conducts an annual air show and many large-scale military exercises. There is also the Yuma Proving Ground, an Army base that tests new military equipment. Yuma Proving Ground is also home to the Special Operations Free Fall School, which provides training in free-fall parachute operations to Special Forces units in all branches of service, as well as those of other nations.

The Colorado River runs along the north and west side of town, serving as the border between Arizona and California. Yuma is an important station for trucking industry movement of goods between California, Arizona and Mexico.

The Rialto movie theater once owned a Kilgen pipe organ, one of the most expensive pipe organs to have been made. Originally played as accompaniment to silent films, it has been moved to the Yuma Theatre.

Every February residents and visitors enjoy the annual rodeo, the Yuma Jaycees Silver Spur Rodeo. A parade opens the events. Cowboys and cowgirls from all over the country compete in the festivities.

The Yuma County Fair takes place annually in the spring at the fairgrounds in Yuma.

On New Year's Eve 2018, the town of Yuma dropped a head of iceberg lettuce from the town's water tower, to symbolize the beginning of the new year, much like the ball drop in New York City's Times Square. This is known as the "Iceberg Drop".

== Sports ==
Yuma has a soccer-specific stadium, Desert Sun Stadium, which hosted Frontera United of the United Premier Soccer League from 2015 to 2017. Previously a baseball facility, Desert Sun Stadium was home to the Yuma Desert Rats of the North American League and site of home games of four teams for the Arizona Winter League. The San Diego Padres used the field as a spring training facility from 1969 until 1993 and a Japanese baseball team, the Yakult Swallows, used the field for spring training from 1995 to 2015. Many local club sports exist in the area as well, including the Yuma Sidewinders Rugby Football Club. The rugby team participates in the Division III Arizona Men's Rugby league, and travels throughout Arizona, California and Nevada, as well as playing home games in Yuma.

== Government ==
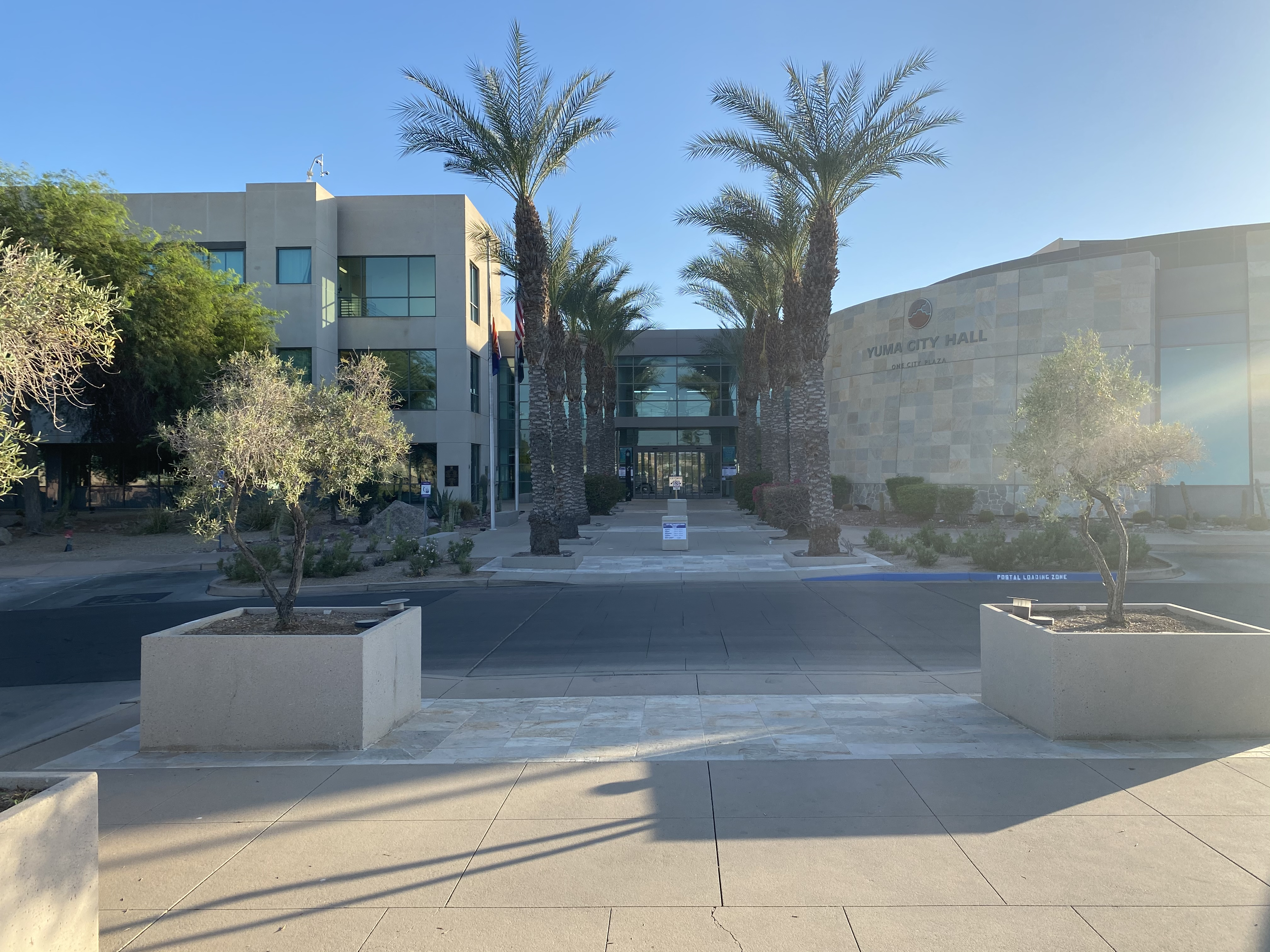
Yuma City Hall

=== Organization ===
The city of Yuma operates as a charter city under the Charter of the City of Yuma. The elected government of the city is the City Council which follows the mayor–council government system and whose members include:

=== Mayor ===
The Mayor of the City of Yuma acts as the chief executive officer of the city, and is elected for a period of four years. The mayor is elected from the city at large. The mayor has the following powers and responsibilities: act as an ex officio chairman of the city council (ensuring all ordinances thereof are enforced), call and preside over meetings, administer oaths and issue proclamations. The mayor is also recognized as the official head of the city by the courts and has the power to take command of the police and govern the city by proclamation during times of great danger.

=== City Council ===
The City of Yuma City Council is the governing body of the City of Yuma and is vested with all powers of legislation in municipal affairs. The council is composed of six council members elected from the city at large for four-year terms, as well as the Mayor of Yuma. A deputy mayor is also elected by the Council who shall act as Mayor during the temporary absence of the mayor. Karen Watts became the most recent Deputy Mayor in 2020. The current council members are Gary Knight, Leslie McClendon, Chris Morris, Ema Lea Shoop, Mike Shelton, and Karen Watts. The next election is the August 2022 Primary for the three city council seats that are currently held by Watts, Knight, and McClendon. Former Deputy Mayor Karen Watts announced her bid for Mayor in 2022.

=== City Administrator ===
The City Council appoints a city administrator who acts as the chief administrative officer of the city. The city administrator is directly responsible to the City Council for the administration of all city affairs placed in his charge by the City Charter, or by ordinances passed by the council. Some of the administrator's duties include: see that all laws and provisions of the City Charter are faithfully executed, prepare and submit the annual budget and capital program to the City Council and keep the City Council fully advised as to the financial condition and future needs of the city.

== Education ==
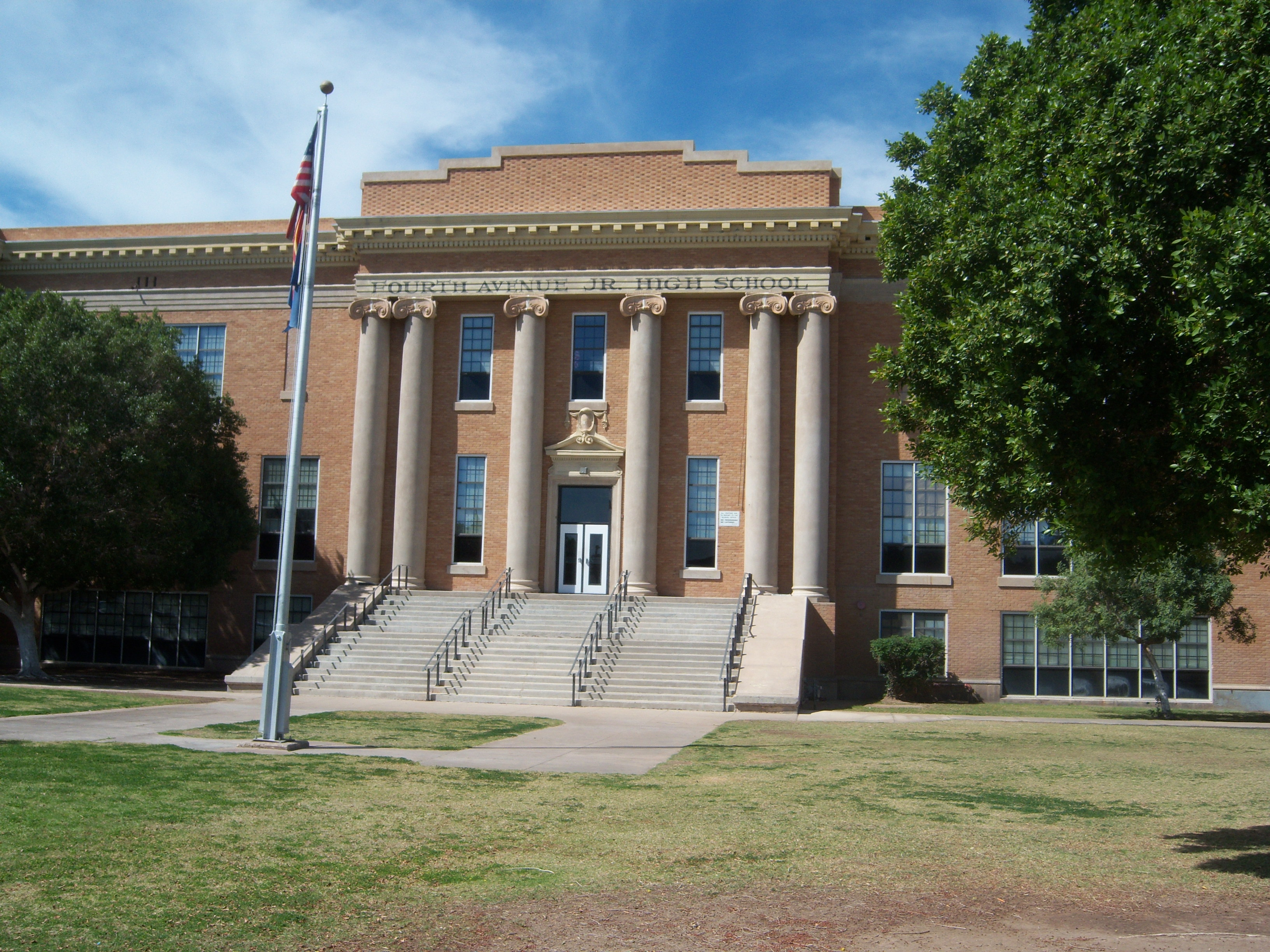
4th Avenue Junior High School

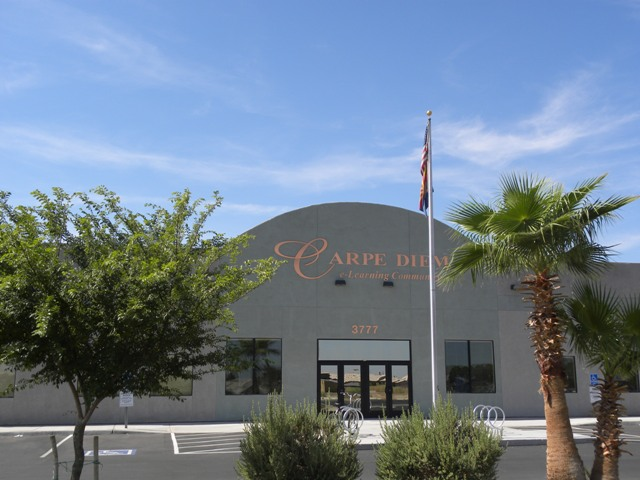
Carpe Diem e-Learning Community, now Desert View Middle & High School

The city is zoned to the Yuma Union High School District. Yuma has five public high schools: Yuma Union High School, Kofa High School, Cibola High School, Gila Ridge High School, Vista Alternative High School; and the private Yuma Catholic High School and Calvary Baptist School. Yuma also has three charter high schools: Desert View Middle & High School, Harvest Preparatory Academy, and YPIC Charter High School.

Central and eastern Yuma is within Yuma Elementary District (District One) while northwestern Yuma is in Crane District. The two districts include several schools as well as junior high schools. Yuma has four charter elementary school: AmeriSchools Academy North and South, Harvest Preparatory Academy, and Desert View Academy.

Additionally, Yuma has six private elementary schools: Yuma Lutheran School, Yuma Adventist Christian School, Immaculate Conception School, St. Francis of Assisi School, Calvary Baptist School and Southwestern Christian School.

Arizona Western College is Yuma's community college, serving primarily as a choice for transfer students and those with shorter career goals.

All three public state universities offer undergraduate and graduate degree programs at the AWC Yuma campus. Northern Arizona University has a branch campus, Arizona State University operates an ASU Local site, and the University of Arizona has a facility adjacent to the campus.

Yuma is served by the Yuma County Library District which consists of a Main Library and several branches, including sites in Somerton, Wellton, Fortuna Foothills, and San Luis. A new main state-of-the-art library is now open.

== Media ==
- Yuma Sun newspaper
- K19CX-DT Public Television (Arizona State University)
- KECY-TV FOX, ABC, CW and Telemundo affiliate
- KVYE Univision affiliate
- KYMA-DT NBC and CBS affiliate
- KCFY 88.1 KCFY Christian radio
- KAWC-FM 88.9 FM public radio (Arizona Western College)
- KYRM 91.9 FM Radio Manantial
- KLJZ 93.1 FM adult contemporary radio
- KTTI 95.1 FM Spanish Christian radio
- XHMIX 98.3 FM top 40 radio
- KYMZ 99.9 FM Radio Sin Fronteras
- KQSR 100.9 FM Christian pop radio
- KCEC 104.5 FM regional Mexican radio
- XHSLR 107.9 FM Grupera radio
- KBLU 560 AM talk radio
- KOFA 1320 AM public radio (Arizona Western College)
- KCYK 1400 AM country radio
- XECB 1460 AM Regional Mexican Radio (Radio Ranchito 1460)

== Infrastructure ==
=== Public transportation ===
- Yuma County Area Transit
- Yuma International Airport
- Yuma Station (Amtrak)
- Greyhound Lines
- FlixBus
- Camel Express to Quartzsite, Arizona

=== Roads ===
- Interstate 8
  - Business Loop 8
- U.S. Route 95
- Arizona State Route 195

== Notable people ==
- H. H. Atherton, Minnesota state senator
- Alex Barrett (born 1994), American football player
- Ryan Bedford, Olympic speed skater
- Darrell Bevell, assistant head coach for the Carolina Panthers
- Charles Brinley, actor of the silent era
- Cesar Chavez, Mexican American civil rights leader
- Tom Childs, miner and rancher
- Gabriel Claudio, soccer player
- Curley Culp, NFL player for Kansas City Chiefs, member of Pro Football Hall of Fame
- Jason DeCorse, guitarist for The Icarus Line
- Efraín Escudero, NCAA All-American wrestler and mixed martial artist
- Eduardo Franco (born 1994), actor
- Edgar Garcia, mixed martial artist, and UFC
- Irving Garcia, USL Pro player for Los Angeles Blues
- Kelvin Gastelum, Ultimate Fighter 17 reality TV show champion
- Bill Hudson, Alaska state legislator
- Ron Jessie, NFL wide receiver for Los Angeles Rams
- Robert Wilson Kennerly, retired politician and community leader
- Curtis Lee, singer
- Jonathan Lines, businessman, former Chair of Arizona Republican Party
- Mike Marshall, manager of Yuma Scorpions, won two World Series rings with Los Angeles Dodgers
- Bengie Molina, Major League Baseball catcher for the Texas Rangers
- Bobby Pacho, 1930s professional boxer and Welterweight world title contender
- Bob Porter, major league baseball player
- DeForest Porter, mayor of Phoenix; Justice, Arizona Territory Supreme Court
- Jose Maria Redondo, entrepreneur and former mayor of Yuma
- John Shanssey, boxer, gambler, saloon owner, and Mayor of Yuma
- Cain Velasquez, UFC heavyweight champion, All-American collegiate wrestler
- Roger L. Worsley, educator; lived in Yuma, 1959 to 1963

== See also ==
- List of historic properties in Yuma, Arizona
- Mission Puerto de Purísima Concepción
- Mission San Pedro y San Pablo de Bicuñer
- Redondo Reservoir
- West Wetlands Park
- Winterhaven, California
