= Yuma Union High School District =

School district in Arizona, United States

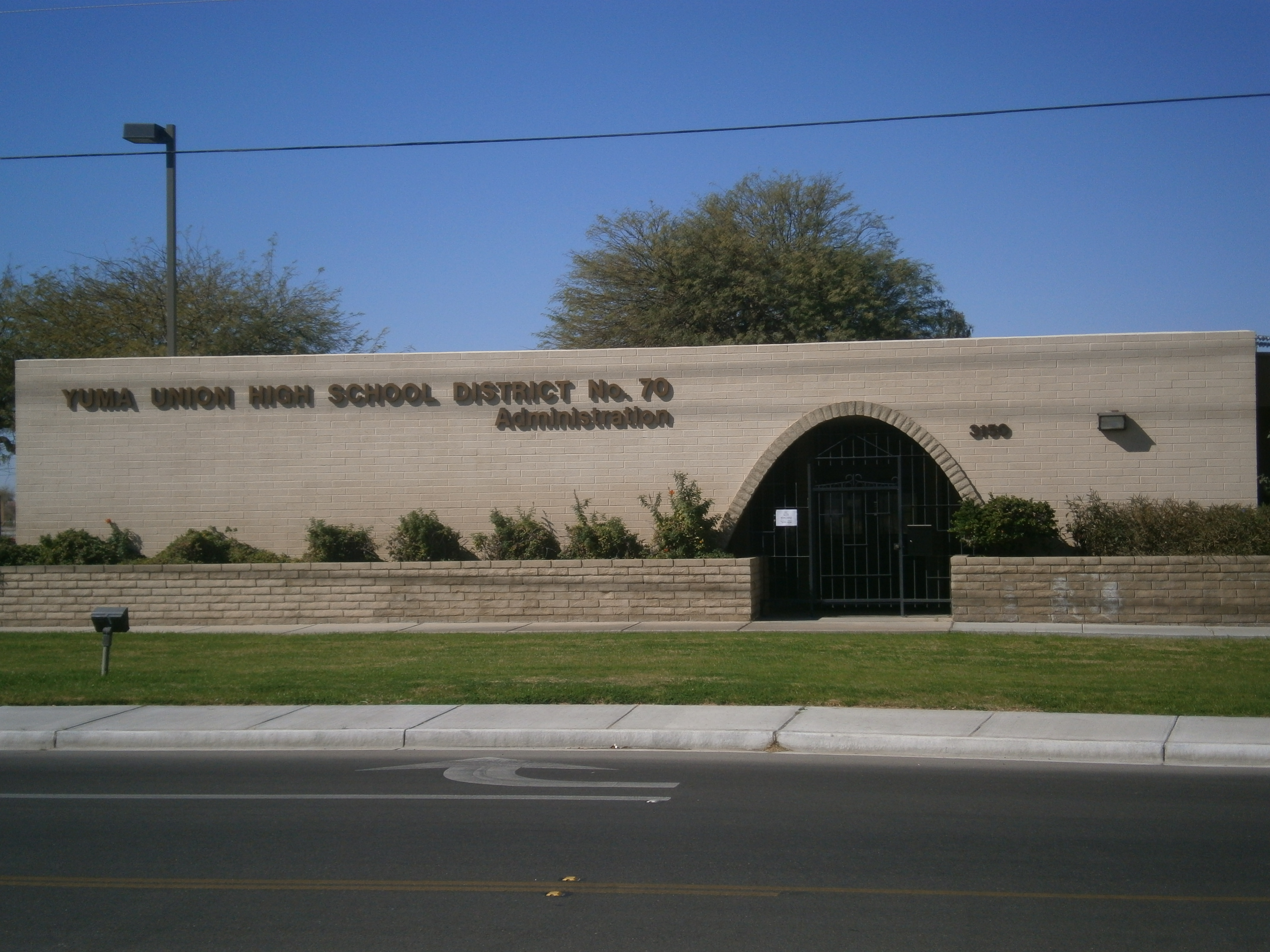
- Former headquarters

Location
- Yuma, Arizona, surrounding areas United States

District information
- Type: Public
- Grades: 9–12
- Established: 1909; 117 years ago
- Superintendent: Gina M. Thompson
- Asst. superintendent(s): Lisa Anderson
- Schools: High schools: 5; Alternative high schools: 1; Online distant academy: 1
- Budget: $71.8 million
- NCES District ID: 0409630

Students and staff
- Students: 11,096 (2021–22)
- Teachers: 454.8 (FTE) (2021–22)
- Student–teacher ratio: 24.4 (2021–22)

Other information
- Website: yumaunion.org

Yuma Union High School District (YUHSD) is a high school district headquartered in Yuma, Arizona.

Feeder elementary school districts include Crane Elementary School District, Gadsden Elementary School District, Somerton Elementary School District, and Yuma Elementary School District. All on-post housing for Marine Corps Air Station Yuma is assigned to schools in Yuma HSD.

In April 2017, the district offices moved into Yuma High School's Old Main building, as the district headquarters will be reconstructed on Avenue A and 32nd street.

== Schools ==
School	Colors
Cibola High School	Black and Gold
Gila Ridge High School	Carolina Blue, Black and White
Kofa High School	Crimson, Gold, and White
San Luis High School	Green and Black
Somerton High School	Navy Blue and Copper
Yuma Union High School	White and Navy Blue
Vista Alternative High School	Purple, Silver and White
