= Cibola High School (Arizona) =

Location
- 4100 W. 20th St. Yuma, Arizona 85364; United States; 32°41′33″N 114°40′07″W

Information
- Type: Public high school
- Established: 1988 (38 years ago)
- School district: Yuma Union High School District
- CEEB code: 030569
- Principal: Brett Pavey
- Staff: 90.14 (FTE)
- Grades: 9-12
- Enrollment: 2,411 (2023-2024)
- Student to teacher ratio: 26.75
- Colors: Black and gold
- Mascot: Raider
- Rival: Gila Ridge High School
- Website: cibola.yumaunion.org

Cibola High School is a high school for the west side of Yuma, Arizona, United States. It was the third high school opened by the Yuma Union High School District upon its 1988 establishment. The name derives from the Seven Cities of Gold, also known as "Cibola."

16th Street Military Housing of Marine Corps Air Station Yuma is assigned to this high school.

== Athletics ==
=== Wrestling ===
The boys wrestling team has secured three state championships (1995, 2014, and 2015).

=== Spiritline ===
The JV Cheer team secured a state championship for D1-2 JV Show Cheer in 2024.

=== Softball ===
The Cibola softball team won the AIA 5A State Championship in 1994. Under coach Shelly Baumann, the Lady Raiders defeated Moon Valley 3-0 in 11 innings.

The Lady Raiders were AIA 5A Runner Ups in 1995 and 1998.

== Notable alumni ==
- Eli Crane, Navy SEAL and US Representative for Arizona
- Efraín Escudero, NJCAA All-American wrestler; professional mixed martial artist, winner of The Ultimate Fighter 8, former UFC lightweight
- Edgar Garcia, Arizona State Wrestling Champion 2002; professional MMA fighter, UFC welterweight veteran
- Kelvin Gastelum, state champion wrestler; professional mixed martial arts fighter, winner of The Ultimate Fighter 17, currently in the UFC
