= 2019 United States elections =

- ← 2017 2018 2019 2020 2021 → Off-year elections
- Election day: November 5

House elections
- Seats contested: 3 mid-term vacancies
- Net seat change: 0
- Map of the 2019 House special elections Democratic hold Republican hold Democratic gain Republican gain Special election held in 2020

Gubernatorial elections
- Seats contested: 3
- Net seat change: Democratic +1
- Map of the 2019 gubernatorial races Democratic gain Republican hold Democratic hold

Elections were held in the United States, in large part, on Tuesday, November 5, 2019. This off-year election included gubernatorial elections in Kentucky, Louisiana, and Mississippi; regularly scheduled state legislative elections in Louisiana, Mississippi, Virginia, and New Jersey; and special elections for seats in various state legislatures. Numerous citizen initiatives, mayoral races, and a variety of other local elections also occurred. Three special elections to the United States House of Representatives also took place in 2019 as a result of vacancies.

Democrats regained the governorship of Kentucky and held the office in Louisiana, despite strong campaign efforts by President Donald Trump for the Republican candidates. Democrats also took control of the state legislature in Virginia. Republicans held the governor's mansion in Mississippi and expanded their control of the Louisiana state legislature and gained seats in the New Jersey state legislature. A major theme in the election results was a suburban revolt against Trump and the Republican Party in general, as these areas swung heavily towards Democratic candidates in local, state, and federal elections.

== Federal special elections ==
Three special elections were held in 2019 to fill vacancies during the 116th United States Congress:

- Pennsylvania's 12th congressional district: Republican Tom Marino resigned on January 23, 2019, to take a private sector job. The district has a partisan index of R+17. Republican state Rep. Fred Keller defeated Democrat Marc Friedenberg in the May 21 election, keeping the seat in Republican hands.
- North Carolina's 3rd congressional district: Republican Walter B. Jones Jr. died on February 10, 2019. The district has a partisan index of R+12. Republican state Rep. Greg Murphy was elected, defeating Democrat Allen M. Thomas and Libertarian Tim Harris.
- North Carolina's 9th congressional district: Due to allegations of election fraud, the results for the 9th congressional district were not certified for the 2018 election, leaving the seat vacant once the 116th Congress began (the seat was previously held by Republican Robert Pittenger, who lost his party's nomination in 2018). On February 21, 2019, the North Carolina State Board of Elections voted unanimously to hold a new election. The district has a partisan index of R+8. Republican state Sen. Dan Bishop was narrowly elected, defeating Democrat Dan McCready, Libertarian Jeff Scott, and Green Loran Allen Smith.

Additional vacancies occurred in Wisconsin's 7th Congressional district following the resignation of Republican Sean Duffy in September 2019; New York's 27th Congressional district following the October 2019 resignation of Republican Chris Collins ahead of his pleading guilty to insider trading; California's 25th Congressional district following the resignation of Democrat Katie Hill in November 2019; and Maryland's 7th Congressional district following the death of Democrat Elijah Cummings on October 17, 2019. Georgia Republican Sen. Johnny Isakson announced in August 2019 that he would resign on December 31, 2019, due to deteriorating health. Special elections to fill the seats occurred in 2020.

=== Party switchers ===
Also during 2019, changes in partisan balance in the House of Representatives happened as the result of members of Congress switching their party affiliation. On July 4, 2019, Rep. Justin Amash declared he would leave the Republican Party but continue to serve in Congress as an independent, turning an evenly split Michigan delegation into a Democratic majority delegation. Following a week of speculation, on December 19, the day after voting against the impeachment of Donald Trump, Rep. Jeff Van Drew of New Jersey officially left the Democratic Party to become a Republican.

== State elections ==
Partisan control of states after the 2019 elections Democratic trifecta Republican trifecta Divided government Officially non-partisan legislature

=== Gubernatorial ===
Three states held gubernatorial elections in 2019:

- Kentucky: In the May 21 primaries, one-term incumbent Republican Matt Bevin faced a strong challenge from three opponents in the Republican primary but managed to win with 52.4%; Democratic attorney general Andy Beshear also faced a strong competition from two other challengers in the Democratic primary but managed to win with 37.9%. In the November 5 general election, Andy Beshear defeated Matt Bevin by just 0.4 percent of the vote; however, the Associated Press declared the race too close to call, and Bevin refused to concede on election night, requesting a recanvass. The recanvass showed little change in the vote totals, and Bevin conceded the election on November 14.
- Louisiana: One-term Democrat John Bel Edwards defeated Eddie Rispone in a run-off election, securing a second term. In the state's October blanket primary, Edwards faced Republicans U.S. Rep. Ralph Abraham and businessman Eddie Rispone, along with three minor candidates. While Edwards received 46.6% of the vote, he did not win a majority and therefore faced a Saturday, November 16 runoff election against Rispone, who received 27.4% of the vote. The runoff election was held on November 16. Despite Republican Donald Trump winning the state by 20 points in 2016, John Bel Edwards was able to narrowly win re-election with 51.3% of the vote against Eddie Rispone's 48.7%.
- Mississippi: Two-term Republican Phil Bryant was term-limited in 2019 and therefore ineligible to seek re-election. In the August 6 primary elections, Attorney General Jim Hood won the Democratic primary, and on August 27, Lt. Gov. Tate Reeves defeated Mississippi Supreme Court Chief Justice Bill Waller Jr. to win the Republican nomination. Though the Associated Press described Hood as the "best-funded Democratic nominee for Mississippi governor since 2003," Reeves won the Mississippi gubernatorial race by a comfortable 51.9% to 46.8% margin.

In addition, in Puerto Rico, Gov. Ricardo Rosselló resigned as part of the territory's 2019 leadership crisis. He was eventually replaced by Wanda Vázquez Garced. Rosselló and Vázquez are both members of the New Progressive Party, but nationally Rosselló is affiliated with the Democratic Party while Vázquez is affiliated with the Republican Party.

=== Attorney General ===
Results of the 2019 US attorney general elections Republican gain Republican hold No election

Regularly scheduled elections were held in 3 of 43 states that elect attorneys general. The previous Attorney General elections for this group of states took place in 2015. One state attorney general ran for reelection and won, while Democrat Jim Hood of Mississippi and Andy Beshear of Kentucky did not run for re-election to run for Governor.

Republicans won every seat in this election, with a net gain of two.

=== Legislative ===
Legislative elections were held for both houses of the Louisiana Legislature, the Mississippi Legislature, and the Virginia General Assembly, as well as the lower house of the New Jersey Legislature. Republicans expanded their control of the Mississippi Legislature, while Democrats kept control of the New Jersey General Assembly, despite Republicans picking up a handful of seats. Democrats gained majorities of both houses of the Virginia General Assembly, giving them control of the legislature for the first time in 20 years. In Louisiana, Republicans expanded their control of the Louisiana Legislature, gaining a supermajority in the state Senate and falling two seats shy of a supermajority in the Louisiana House.

Special elections were also held during the year to fill state legislative seats vacated due to retirement, death, resignation, election to another office, or other reasons. During 2019, special elections were set or run for 77 vacated seats — 39 held by Democrats and 38 held by Republicans. Of the 74 special elections held by year-end, five seats flipped from Democratic to Republican, two flipped from Republican to Democratic, and one flipped from Republican to Independent. None of these changes impacted partisan control of the state legislature.

=== Judicial ===
Three states held supreme court elections in 2019.

- Kentucky held a special election for the Kentucky Supreme Court to fill a vacancy caused by the retirement of Chief Justice Bill Cunningham, for a term to expire in 2022. Judge Christopher S. Nickell defeated state senator Whitney Westerfield in the November general election.
- Louisiana held a special election for the Louisiana Supreme Court to fill a vacancy caused by the resignation of Justice Greg G. Guidry, for a term to expire in 2029. Attorney William J. Crain defeated Hans J. Liljeberg in the November general election.
- In Wisconsin, incumbent Wisconsin Supreme Court Justice Shirley Abrahamson did not seek re-election to a 5th ten-year term. In the April general election, Republican-backed Judge Brian Hagedorn defeated Democrat-backed Judge Lisa Neubauer by a small margin.

=== State trifectas and redistricting ===
In the 2019 elections, Republicans successfully defended their trifecta (unified control of the governorship and the state legislature) in Mississippi, while Democrats defended their trifecta in New Jersey and prevented Republicans from gaining a trifecta in Louisiana. Republicans lost their trifecta in Kentucky, while Democrats gained a trifecta in Virginia. These state elections were to impact the redistricting that followed the 2020 United States census, as many states task governors and state legislators with drawing new boundaries for state legislative and congressional districts.

=== Ballot measures ===
24 binding ballot measures were voted on in seven states.

- In Pennsylvania, voters were to consider a constitutional amendment to adopt Marsy's Law protections for crime victims. Just days before the election, however, an injunction was issued blocking the commonwealth from tallying votes on the amendment. The Supreme Court of Pennsylvania affirmed the injunction on the eve of the election.
- In Texas, voters approved nine of ten proposed amendments to the Lone Star State's constitution, most notably Proposition 4, intended to ban a state income tax. Texas is one of only nine U.S. states without a state income tax.
- In Washington state, voters narrowly approved Referendum 88, a veto referendum to overturn Initiative 1000, which allowed for affirmative action policies in the areas of public education, employment, and contracting. Voters also approved Initiative 976, limiting motor vehicle registration fees used for infrastructure and transit projects; passage of the bill is expected to decrease funding for transportation projects in the state by $4 billion by 2025.
- In the U.S. Virgin Islands, a ballot initiative to change how seats in the Legislature of the Virgin Islands are apportioned was defeated due to low voter turnout. A majority of voters approved of the reapportionment plan during the March 30, 2019, special election; however, only about 9 percent of registered voters participated in the election, and a majority of all registered voters was required for the initiative to pass.

== Local elections ==
=== Mayoral elections ===
Although most mayorships and other local offices are non-partisan, when looking at party identification of the officeholders, registered Democrats gained three mayorships during 2019 (Phoenix, Arizona; Raleigh, North Carolina; and Wichita, Kansas) and Republicans picked up one (Aurora, Colorado). Following the November elections, registered Democrats had held 62 mayorships (+2) in the 100 largest cities in the United States, registered Republicans hold 29 (+1), and independents hold 4 (−3). The remaining five had been nonpartisan or were undetermined.

==== Re-elected incumbents ====
Incumbent mayors won re-election in major cities during 2019, including Arlington, Texas (Jeff Williams); Cary, North Carolina (Harold Weinbrecht); Charlotte, North Carolina (Vi Lyles); Charleston, South Carolina (John Tecklenburg); Colorado Springs, Colorado (John Suthers); Denver (Michael Hancock); Duluth, Minnesota (Emily Larson); Durham, North Carolina (Steve Schewel); Evansville, Indiana (Lloyd Winnecke); Fairbanks, Alaska (Jim Matherly); Fort Collins, Colorado (Wade Troxell); Fort Wayne, Indiana (Tom Henry); Fort Worth, Texas (Betsy Price); Gainesville, Florida (Lauren Poe); Grand Rapids, Michigan (Rosalynn Bliss); Hartford, Connecticut (Luke Bronin); Houston (Sylvester Turner); Indianapolis, Indiana (Joe Hogsett); Jacksonville, Florida (Lenny Curry); Las Vegas, Nevada (Carolyn Goodman); Manchester, New Hampshire (Joyce Craig); Memphis, Tennessee (Jim Strickland); Orlando, Florida (Buddy Dyer); Philadelphia, Pennsylvania (Jim Kenney); Rapid City, South Dakota (Steve Allender); San Antonio, Texas (Ron Nirenberg); and Springfield, Massachusetts (Domenic Sarno) and Worcester, Massachusetts (Joseph Petty).

San Francisco, California incumbent mayor London Breed, who won a special election to become mayor following the death of mayor Ed Lee, was elected to her first full term. After the Yonkers, New York, City Council extended mayoral term limits from two terms to three in late 2018, incumbent Mike Spano went on to win a third term.

Incumbents Andrew Ginther in Columbus, Ohio, Dan Gelber in Miami Beach, Florida, and Ken McClure in Springfield, Missouri were unopposed in seeking re-election.

==== Incumbents defeated for re-election ====
In Flint, Michigan, state representative Sheldon Neeley defeated incumbent Karen Weaver, who was seeking a second term. In Madison, Wisconsin, Satya Rhodes-Conway defeated longtime incumbent mayor Paul Soglin, and in Nashville, Tennessee, city councilman John Cooper defeated incumbent David Briley. In Portland, Maine, former school board chair Kate Snyder unseated incumbent Ethan Strimling, and in Wichita, Kansas, state Rep. Brandon Whipple defeated incumbent Jeff Longwell. In Brownsville, Texas, Trey Mendez won a run-off election to replace incumbent mayor Tony Martinez, who came in third in the primary election.

==== Open mayoral seats ====
Open mayoral seats were won in Aurora, Colorado (Mike Coffman); Dallas, Texas (Eric Johnson); Green Bay, Wisconsin (Eric Genrich); Kansas City, Missouri (Quinton Lucas); Knoxville, Tennessee (Indya Kincannon); Lafayette, Louisiana (Josh Guillory); Lincoln, Nebraska (Leirion Gaylor Baird); Newark, Delaware (Jerry Clifton); Raleigh, North Carolina (Mary-Ann Baldwin); and West Palm Beach, Florida (Keith James). In South Bend, Indiana, Democrat James Mueller defeated Republican Sean Haas to replace incumbent Pete Buttigieg, who declined to run for a third term in favor of a presidential campaign. In Garland, Texas, Scott LeMay was unopposed in seeking an open mayoral seat.

==== Special elections ====
- Special mayoral election in Allentown, Pennsylvania, interim mayor Ray O'Connell was elected to finish the remaining two years of former Mayor Ed Pawlowski, who resigned in 2018 after being convicted for corruption.
- Special Election Runoff in Phoenix, Arizona, city council member Kate Gallego was elected mayor in the March runoff election following the 2018 resignation of Mayor Greg Stanton; Gallego had come in first in the November 2018 special election, but failed to win an outright majority.
- Special mayoral election in Port Richey, Florida, attorney Scott Tremblay was elected mayor to replace Vice Mayor Terrence Rowe who was arrested on conspiracy charges 20 days after being elevated to mayor following the arrest of Mayor Dale Massad for practicing medicine without a license.
- Special mayoral election in Scranton, Pennsylvania, won by Independent Paige Cognetti following the resignation of Mayor Bill Courtright, who pleaded guilty to federal corruption charges; Cognetti is the first female mayor of the city.

==== Recall elections ====
Nationwide, 90 city council members and 45 mayors or vice-mayors were subject to recall efforts, along with 44 school board members and 51 other city, county, or state officials. In total, 87 of these efforts made it to the ballot and slightly more than half were successful in recalling the official; an additional 16 officials resigned before a recall election could be held. Mayors were successfully recalled in Wickenburg, Arizona; Brighton, Colorado; Bovill and Dalton Gardens, Idaho; Albion, Michigan; York, Nebraska; Metolius, Oregon; and Rio Bravo, Texas. Mayors in Elk River, Kooskia, and Sugar City, Idaho, and in Arnegard and Tower City, North Dakota, were retained in office. In Huntington, Oregon, voters recalled Mayor Richard Cummings who'd survived a 2018 recall attempt when he served on the city council.

In Fall River, Massachusetts, voters successfully recalled Mayor Jasiel Correia and re-elected him in the same election. Correia faced recall after being charged with wire fraud and filing false tax returns in 2018. Five candidates, including Correia, qualified to run in the event of a successful recall, and a plurality of voters voted for Correia. In September, Correia was charged with extorting cannabis dispensaries looking to do business in the city; the city council vote to remove him from office, but Correia rejected their authority to do so. Correia stood for re-election to a third term, coming in second during the September 17 preliminary election. On October 15, 2019, Correia suspended his campaign, and, ultimately, came in third, behind write-in votes with school board member Paul Coogan winning the election.

=== Other local elections ===
- Democrats took control of Columbus, Indiana, hometown of Vice President Mike Pence, winning a majority of seats on the city council for the first time since 1981.
- In Hamilton County, Indiana, Democrats ended decades-long single-party Republican control of city councils in Carmel and Fishers.
- In Monroe County, New York, Adam Bello became the first Democrat elected county executive in nearly 30 years.
- In the Philadelphia metropolitan area, Democrats gained a majority on the Bucks County Board of Commissioners for the first time since 1983, gained a majority on the Delaware County Council for the first time since the Civil War, and gained a majority on the Chester County Board of Commissioners for the first time in the party's history. However, in Armstrong, Greene, Washington, and Westmoreland counties in southwestern Pennsylvania, Republicans gained control of the county Boards of Commissioners. In Luzerne County, Republicans secured a majority on the county's governing board for the first time since 1989.
- In Polk County, Iowa, although most local and municipal races are nonpartisan, candidates running on progressive platforms won 13 city county and school board seats previously held by more conservative officials. Among the winners were Suresh Reddy, the first Indian American, and Scott Syroka, the first Latino, elected to the Johnston, Iowa, city council, as well as Lonnette Dafney and Deshara Bohanna, the first African American members of the West Des Moines and Ankeny school boards, respectively.
- In Seattle, an attempt backed by e-commerce giant Amazon to install a more business-friendly city council failed.
- In Virginia, Democrats won five of eight seats to flip control of the Prince William County Board of County Supervisors, which has had a Republican majority for more than 20 years. Also, in Loudoun County, Democrats won three seats on the county's Board of Supervisors, giving them a majority for the first time since 2012.

=== Local referendums ===
- In Denver, voters narrowly approved a citizen-initiated ordinance to effectively decriminalize psilocybin mushrooms for personal use and possession by adults. The city's voters also defeated an initiative to overturn Denver's ban on urban camping. In the June runoff election, voters passed an ordinance barring city officials from spending tax money on future Olympic bids without first seeking voter approval. In the November general election, Denver voters approved the establishment of a Department of Transportation & Infrastructure for the city.
- Voters in East Baton Rouge Parish, Louisiana, voted to incorporate part of the parish as a new city, St. George. The incorporation effort began in 2013 as an effort to create a new public school district separate from East Baton Rouge Parish Public Schools.
- In a non-binding referendum, two-thirds of undergraduate students at Georgetown University voted to impose a semesterly fee to fund reparations for descendants of 272 slaves sold by the Maryland Jesuits in 1838.
- Jersey City, New Jersey, voters approved strict regulations on short-term rentals, in a major blow to Airbnb and other short-term rental companies.
- Kansas City, Missouri, voters overturned a 2018 city council decision to rename The Paseo after Martin Luther King Jr., restoring the parkway's prior name.
- New York City's Charter Revision Commission placed five questions on the 2019 ballot for voters to decide, including a proposal to adopt ranked choice voting for city elections. Ranked-choice voting was approved by 73.5% of voters, and the four other revisions all passed as well.
- Voters in Oklahoma City approved a charter amendment allowing city council members to work for the state or federal government. The bill allows state or federal employees, such as school teachers or park rangers, to serve on the city council.
- Parma, Ohio, voters upheld the city's ban on pit bull-type dogs by 14 votes.
- Phoenix, Arizona, voters rejected ballot initiatives to halt expansion of the Valley Metro Rail light rail system and to cap city spending to help pay down pension debt.
- In San Francisco, a ballot initiative backed by electronic cigarette manufacturer Juul to overturn the city's ban on e-cigarettes and flavored tobacco products failed overwhelmingly.
- San Juan County, Utah, voters rejected Proposition 10, which would have looked to change the structure of the county government; the proposition was characterized by opponents as an effort to undermine the county's first elected Navajo-majority county commission.
- Voters in Tucson, Arizona, narrowly rejected becoming a sanctuary city, which would have limited municipal cooperation with federal immigration law enforcement.

== Tribal elections ==
Several notable Native American tribal governments held elections for tribal leadership in 2019.

Incumbents Tribal Chairman Don Gentry of the Klamath Tribes and Tribal Council Chief Beverly Kiohawiton Cook of the St. Regis Mohawk Tribe were both re-elected to a third term. Seminole Tribe of Florida Tribal Council Chairman Marcellus Osceola Jr. was re-elected to a second term. Larry Romanelli was elected to a fourth term as Ogema of the Little River Band of Ottawa Indians. Catawba Nation Chair Bill Harris, Comanche Nation Tribal Chairman William Nelson Sr., Fort Peck Tribes Chairman Floyd Azure, Nez Perce Tribe of Idaho Tribal Executive Committee Chairman Shannon Wheeler, Red Cliff Band of Lake Superior Chippewa Tribal Chair Richard Peterson, Wampanoag Tribe of Gay Head Tribal Chairperson Cheryl Andrews-Maltais, and Yankton Sioux Tribe Tribal Chairman Robert Flying Hawk were also all re-elected. Richard Sneed won re-election to his first full-term as principal chief of the Eastern Band of Cherokee Indians; Sneed had been elevated to principal chief in 2017 following the impeachment of then Principal Chief Patrick Lambert. Mescalero Apache Tribe Tribal President Robert "Gabe" Aguilar, who was elevated to president when Tribal President Arthur "Butch" Blaze resigned for health reasons in October, was also re-elected to his first full term.

Choctaw Nation incumbent Chief Gary Batton was unopposed in seeking a second term, and Chickasaw Nation Gov. Bill Anoatubby was unopposed in seeking a ninth consecutive four-year term. Dr. John Creel was unopposed in the election for chief of the Edisto Natchez-Kusso Tribe.

Former Cherokee Nation Secretary of State Chuck Hoskin Jr. was elected principal chief in a contentious election. David Hill was elected principal chief of the Muscogee (Creek) Nation in an extended election process that included a rerun of the primary election due to questions about how absentee ballots were handled. Also in elections for open seats, Teri Gobin was elected chairwoman of the Tulalip Tribes and Reginald Atkinson was elected mayor of the Metlakatla Indian Community.

Ned Norris Jr. was elected chairman of the Tohono O'odham Nation, a position he previously held for two terms, defeating incumbent chairman Edward Manuel. Cyrus Ben defeated incumbent Tribal Chief Phyliss J. Anderson to lead the Mississippi Band of Choctaw Indians. Byron Nelson Jr. was elected tribal chairman of the Hoopa Valley Tribe, defeating incumbent Ryan Jackson. Manuel Heart, who previously served multiple terms as Ute Mountain Ute Tribe tribal chairman, defeated incumbent Harold Cuthair. Jimmy Whiteshirt defeated incumbent Bruce Pratt in a runoff election to become president of the Pawnee Nation.

=== Special and recall elections ===
A special election triggered by the resignation of Jicarilla Apache Nation President Levi Pesata in February was won by Legislative Council member Darrell Paiz in a runoff, and Rynalea Whiteman Pena was elected president of the Northern Cheyenne Tribal Council in a special election following the resignation of prior president L. Jace Killsback. Beth Drost was elected as the first female Tribal Chair of the Grand Portage Band of Lake Superior Chippewa in a special election following the death of long-time Tribal Chair Norman Deschampe. Michael Fairbanks was elected Tribal Chairman of the White Earth Nation in Minnesota in a special election following the death of prior chairman Terry Tibbetts.

Northern Arapaho Tribe voters rejected an effort to recall Chairman Lee Spoonhunter. Similarly, the Little Traverse Bay Bands of Odawa Indians voted to retain Regina Gasco-Bentley as tribal chairperson in a recall effort.

Mashpee Wampanoag Tribal Council Chair Cedric Cromwell faced a September 15 recall election over questions about his management of tribal funds; however, the election was called off on September 12 due to questions about the recall petition process.

=== Tribal referendums ===
- The Hoopa Valley Tribe in California narrowly rejected an effort to open tribal land to cannabis cultivation.
- Spirit Lake Tribe voters in North Dakota approved alcohol sales at the Spirit Lake Casino & Resort, overturning a decades-old ban on alcohol sales on the reservation.
- Te-Moak Tribe of Western Shoshone voters rejected a ballot petition to replace a blood quantum requirement for tribal membership with a direct lineal descent system.
- The Keweenaw Bay Indian Community in December approved a resolution in favor of establishing term limits for tribal council members.

== Other elections ==
=== Speaker of the U.S. House election ===
Republican Congressman Paul Ryan, the Speaker of the United States House of Representatives during the 115th United States Congress, declined to seek re-election in 2018. After Democrats gained a majority in the House of Representatives in the 2018 elections, House Minority Leader and former Speaker Nancy Pelosi sought election to a new term as Speaker of the House. She won the election with 220 votes, all of which came from members of the Democratic Party. Most Republican members of the House voted for Kevin McCarthy, who, through a separate election, succeeded Pelosi as House Minority Leader. The remaining votes for Speaker went to several different individuals, including Republican Congressman Jim Jordan and Democratic Congresswoman Cheri Bustos.

=== Party leadership elections ===
Several state Democratic and Republican parties also selected new leaders for their organizations during 2019 at party conventions or through other closed processes.

==== Democratic ====
- Rusty Hicks was elected chair of the California Democratic Party.
- Nikema Williams was elected chair of the Democratic Party of Georgia.
- Christopher J. England was elected chair of the Alabama Democratic Party.
- Randy Seiler was elected chair of the South Dakota Democratic Party.
- Ben Wikler was elected chair of the Democratic Party of Wisconsin.
- Yvette Lewis was elected chair of the Maryland Democratic Party.
- Jeff Merchant was elected chair of the Utah Democratic Party.
- Alicia Andrews was elected chair of the Oklahoma Democratic Party.

==== Republican ====
- David Shafer was elected chair of the Georgia Republican Party.
- Raúl Labrador was elected chair of the Idaho Republican Party.
- Laura Cox was elected chair of the Michigan Republican Party.
- Michael Whatley was elected chair of the North Carolina Republican Party.

== Milestones ==
In Alabama, which was the location of many pivotal moments in the American civil rights movement, several cities elected their first African American mayor in 2019. In the capital city of Montgomery, Probate Judge Steven Reed was elected mayor in a run-off, and in Talladega Timothy Ragland defeated incumbent mayor Jerry Cooper in a run-off. Also, voters in Eastpointe, Michigan, elected council member Monique Owens mayor, making her the city's first African American mayor.

Two large cities elected their first out LGBT+ mayors in 2019. In Chicago, Lori Lightfoot was elected as the city's first female African American mayor and first lesbian mayor in what was only the second-ever mayoral runoff election in the city's history. In Tampa, Florida, Jane Castor also won a run-off election to become the first gay woman to lead a major Florida city.

In Tucson, Arizona, Democrat Regina Romero was elected the city's first female and first Latina mayor. In Boise, Idaho, City Council President Lauren McLean defeated incumbent Dave Bieter to become the first woman elected as mayor in the city and winner of the city's first-ever mayoral run-off election. Similarly, in Belton, South Carolina, Tiffany Ownbey defeated incumbent Wendell Page, making her the first woman to be elected mayor of the city. In Salt Lake City, Utah, Councilwoman Erin Mendenhall became the city's third female mayor after defeating state senator Luz Escamilla; it was the first time two women had faced each other in a mayoral runoff in the city.

City councilman Dr. An Minh Truong won an open seat for mayor of Haltom City, Texas, making him the first Vietnamese-American mayor in Tarrant County and possibly the first in Texas.

== Electoral irregularities ==
Two Republicans were charged with electoral fraud in Marion County, Ohio. The GOP candidate for Marion city auditor, Robert Landon, and Marion County Republican Party official John Matthews were charged with distributing phony sample ballots, a misdemeanor.

Without providing any evidence, Republican incumbent Matt Bevin said there were "significant irregularities" in the vote count process for Kentucky governor. He refused to concede and asked for a recanvass, which took place on November 14. Democrat Andy Beshear won by only 5,000 votes, and some feared Bevin was trying to steal the election. However, the recanvass did not change the election outcome, and Bevin subsequently conceded.

== Tables of partisan control results ==
The following tables show the partisan results of the congressional, gubernatorial, and state legislative election races, as well as party switchers, in 2019. Only the affected congressional districts and states in 2019 are shown. Governorships/legislatures in these affected states that were not up for election in 2019 were already filled in for the "after 2019 elections" section. Bold indicates a change in control.

House Congressional seats
| Subdivision and PVI | | Before 2019 elections | | After 2019 elections | |
| Seat | PVI | Incumbent | State delegation | Winner | State delegation |
|---|---|---|---|---|---|
| California 25th | Even | Dem | Dem 46–7 | Election in 2020 | |
| Maryland 7th | D+26 | Dem | Dem 7–1 | Election in 2020 | |
| New York 27th | R+11 | Rep | Dem 21–6 | Election in 2020 | |
| North Carolina 3rd | R+12 | Rep | Rep 9–3 (Note: The seat for North Carolina's 9th congressional district is counted as vacant due to the voided 2018 election. It was previously held by a Republican.) | Rep | Rep 10–3 |
| North Carolina 9th | R+8 | Vacant | Rep 9–3 | Rep | Rep 10–3 |
| Pennsylvania 12th | R+17 | Rep | Split 9–9 | Rep | Split 9–9 |
| Wisconsin 7th | R+8 | Rep | Rep 5–3 | Election in 2020 | |

House Congressional party changes
| Subdivision and PVI | | Change from | | Change to | |
| Seat | PVI | Previous | State delegation | Current | State delegation |
|---|---|---|---|---|---|
| Michigan 3rd | R+6 | Rep | Split 7–7 | Ind | **Dem 7–6–1** |
| New Jersey 2nd | R+1 | Dem | Dem 11–1 | Rep | Dem 10–2 |

State control results
| | Before 2019 elections | | After 2019 elections | |
| State | Governor | State leg. | Governor | State leg. |
|---|---|---|---|---|
| Kentucky | Rep | Rep | **Dem** | Rep |
| Louisiana | Dem | Rep | Dem | Rep |
| Mississippi | Rep | Rep | Rep | Rep |
| New Jersey | Dem | Dem | Dem | Dem |
| Virginia | Dem | Rep | Dem | **Dem** |

=== Partisan control of statewide offices ===
| | Before election | | | | | After election | | | | |
| State | Attorney general | Governor | Lieutenant governor | Auditor | Treasurer | Attorney general | Governor | Lieutenant governor | Auditor | Treasurer |
|---|---|---|---|---|---|---|---|---|---|---|
| Kentucky | Dem | Rep | Rep | Rep | Rep | **Rep** | **Dem** | **Dem** | Rep | Rep |
| Louisiana | Rep | Dem | Rep | | Rep | Rep | Dem | Rep | | Rep |
| Mississippi | Dem | Rep | Rep | Rep | Rep | **Rep** | Rep | Rep | Rep | Rep |
