= Isidro López =

Isidro López may refer to:

- Isidro López (musician) (born 1929), Tejano bandleader Latin American music in the United States
- Isidro Lopez (Tohono O'odham leader), Native American tribal leader and Arizona politician
- Isidro Michel López (1870–1942), Mexican military officer
- Isidro Baldenegro López (c. 1966–2017), Mexican environmental activist, and tribal leader of the Tarahumara
