= Littletown, Arizona =

CDP in Pima County, Arizona

- Former CDP
- Location in Pima County and the state of Arizona

- Location in the United States
- Coordinates: 32°7′56″N 110°52′37″W
- Country: United States
- State: Arizona
- County: Pima

Area
  - Total: 0.12 sq mi (0.32 km^{2})
  - Land: 0.12 sq mi (0.32 km^{2})
  - Water: 0 sq mi (0.00 km^{2})
- Elevation: 2,717 ft (828 m)

Population (2010)
  - Total: 5,476
  - Estimate (2016): N/A
- Time zone: UTC-7 (MST (no DST))
- FIPS code: 04-41540
- GNIS feature ID: 7239

Littletown was a census-designated place (CDP) in Pima County, Arizona, United States. The population was 1,010 at the 2000 census. The area was annexed into Tucson in 2017.

== Geography ==
Littletown is located at 32°7′56″N 110°52′37″W (32.132144, -110.877003).

According to the Federal Bureau of the Census, the CDP has a total area of 0.4 square miles (1.0 km^{2}), all land.

Littletown is located on Interstate 10, southeast of Drexel-Alvernon. It was mostly surrounded by Tucson until it became part of the city.

== Demographics ==
Historical population
Census	Pop.	Note	%±
2000	1,010		—
2010	5,476		442.2%
U.S. Decennial Census

At the 2000 census, there were 1,010 people, 313 households, and 244 families living in the CDP. The population density was 2,230.8 inhabitants per square mile (861.3/km^{2}). There were 329 housing units at an average density of 726.7/sq mi (280.6/km^{2}). The racial makeup of the CDP was 64.1% White, 2.1% Black or African American, 2.7% Native American, 0.2% Asian, 24.9% from other races, and 6.1% from two or more races. 50.4% of the population were Hispanic or Latino of any race. Of the 313 households, 41.2% had children under the age of 18 living with them, 55.0% were married couples living together, 16.0% had a female householder with no husband present, and 22.0% were non-families. 17.3% of households were one person and 4.2% were one person aged 65 or older. The average household size was 3.23 and the average family size was 3.66.

The age distribution was 33.6% under the age of 18, 10.7% from 18 to 24, 26.5% from 25 to 44, 22.8% from 45 to 64, and 6.4% 65 or older. The median age was 30 years. For every 100 females, there were 96.1 males. For every 100 females age 18 and over, there were 92.3 males.

The median household income was $35,833 and the median family income was $35,046. Males had a median income of $26,394 versus $17,396 for females. The per capita income for the CDP was $8,892. About 7.7% of families and 9.7% of the population were below the poverty line, including 7.5% of those under age 18 and 65.2% of those age 65 or over.

== Education ==
The former CDP is served by Craycroft Elementary School, Billy Lane Laufer Middle School, and Desert View High School, all part of the Sunnyside Unified School District.
