= Laura Toenjes =

Superintendent of the Kyrene School District

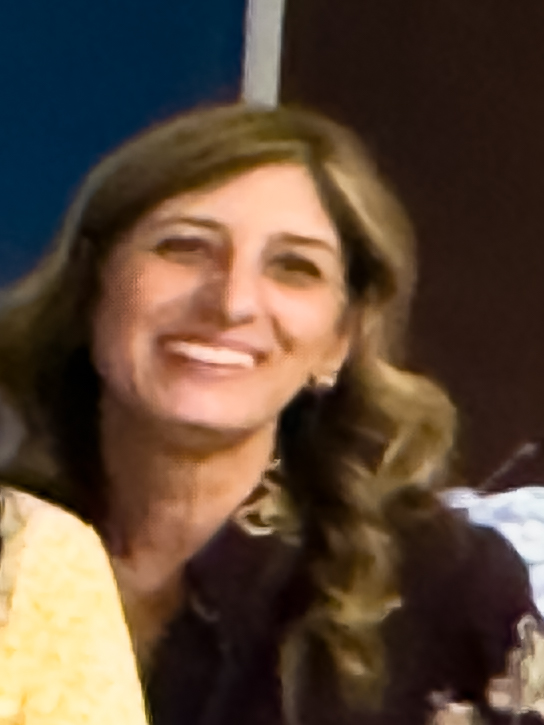
- Photo of Laura Toenjes taken on October 28, 2025 at the Kyrene School District board meeting
- Title: Superintendent of the Kyrene School District

Laura Toenjes is the superintendent of the Kyrene School District in Arizona. Since assuming the role in 2020, she oversees a district of approximately 12,000 students across 25 elementary and middle schools, serving the communities of Ahwatukee, south Tempe, and west Chandler.

Toenjes joined the Kyrene School District in 2016 during the tenure of Superintendent Dr. Jan Vesely. Following Vesely's retirement announcement in October 2020, the governing board appointed Toenjes to the position. Her contract currently runs through June 30, 2027. Prior to her time at Kyrene, she held leadership roles at the Sunnyside Unified School District and the Arizona Department of Education.

== Notable decisions ==
=== School Closures ===
In late 2024 and throughout 2025, Superintendent Laura Toenjes led the Kyrene School District through a significant restructuring process in response to a decade-long decline in student enrollment. In February 2025, the Kyrene Governing Board created the Long Range Planning Committee. Toenjes was involved, and vetted 58 members of the committee.

Facing a "new reality" where the district was built for 20,000 students but served only 12,000, Toenjes advocated for a "right-sizing" plan to ensure the district's long-term financial solvency and the preservation of educational programs. Following months of public forums and committee meetings, the Governing Board voted on December 16, 2025, to close six schools by 2028: Kyrene de la Colina, Kyrene de la Estrella, Kyrene de las Manitas, Kyrene Traditional Academy, Akimel A-al Middle School, and Pueblo Middle School.

Toenjes was the primary spokesperson for the initiative, often acknowledging the emotional toll the decision took on the community while maintaining that inaction would be fiscally irresponsible. Following the final vote, she described the move as "what may be the most significant action in our district's history, in order to preserve the Kyrene experience now and for generations to come". Throughout the process, she emphasized that the consolidation would allow the district to reinvest savings into teacher salaries and specialized programs. Addressing the transition for affected families, Toenjes stated, "Our current Kyrene kids will be our priority in all of our transition," and pledged that the district would "take great care to ensure our students and our staff feel supported every step of the way".

=== Equity and Inclusion ===
In April 2025, Toenjes re-affirmed that the school district's "policies around equity, inclusion and social-emotional wellness—are fully compliant with Title VI of the Civil Rights Act of 1964." Arizona Superintendent of Public Instruction Tom Horne threatened to withhold $1.5 million of federal funding per guidance from the United States Department of Education. The guidance was subsequently revoked, and district was properly funded.
