= 2019 Muscogee (Creek) general elections =

2019 Muscogee (Creek) Nation General Elections
- September 21, 2019 (Primary, nullified); November 2, 2019 (Primary); December 14, 2019 (General)
Candidate	David Hill	Steve Bruner
Popular vote	3,399	1,779
Percentage	65.6%	34.4%
Principal Chief before election
James R. Floyd
Elected Principal Chief
David Hill

The 2019 Muscogee (Creek) general elections took place on November 2, 2019, to elect the Principal Chief, Second Chief, and half of the 16 National Council seats of the Muscogee Nation. The primary election was held on September 21 and in races where no one candidate won a majority of the votes, the top candidates moved on to the November general election. Muscogee (Creek) National general elections are held on the Saturday immediately following the first Friday of November every four years. Enrolled citizens, 18 years of age and above are eligible to register to vote in the elections. Incumbent Principal Chief James R. Floyd announced in June 2019 that he would not seek re-election and Second Chief Louis Hicks was unable to seek re-election due to term limits.

Because of irregularities, the primary election results were nullified and November 2 became the new primary election date with general election runoffs, when necessary, being held on December 14, 2019. National Council Second Speaker David Hill was the top vote-getter in the November primary and was elected principal chief in the December general election runoff; National Council Representative Del Beaver was elected second chief outright in the November primary. Hill and Beaver had both received the most votes in the nullified September primary.

== Candidate Eligibility ==
Muscogee (Creek) Nation Territory

Eligible Voters
District	Number of Voters
Creek	2,091
McIntosh	2,135
Muskogee	1,179
Okfuskee	1,729
Okmulgee	3,940
Tukvptce	1,540
Tulsa	3,468
Wagoner	847
Total	16,929

Employees of Muscogee (Creek) nation that file for candidacy must file for a leave of absence from their employment from the day they file for candidacy until the day after the elections.

== Candidates ==
Important Election Dates
Candidate Filing Period	July 15 - July 17
Early Primary Voting	September 18&19
Primary Election	September 21
Early General Voting	October 30&31
General Election	November 2

=== Principal Chief ===
Candidate name	Slogan	Notes
Steve Bruner	Better with Bruner	Former Speaker of National Council
David Hill	Prosperity and Progress for All Mvskokvlke	Current National Council representative for the Creek District
George Tiger		Former principal chief
Monte Randall	#DR4Chief	Former Dean of Academic Affairs at Tribal College
Lucian Tiger III		National Council Speaker
Joseph Rogers Jr.		Tulsa construction business owner
Brenda Golden		Okmulgee attorney
Jackie Jackson		Planning Director for the Otoe-Missouria Tribe
Timothy Good Voice		Thlopthlocco Tribal Town Administrator
Samuel Alexander		Tulsa District Representative

=== Second Chief ===
Candidate name	Notes
Del Beaver	Okmulgee District Representative
Adam Jones III	McIntosh District Representative

=== National Council ===
Creek District A	McIntosh District A	Muskogee District A	Okfuskee District A	Okmulgee District A	Tukvpvtce District A	Tulsa District A	Wagoner District A
Joseph Hicks Dode Warrington Barnett Dean Hughes Jr.	Darrell Proctor Charles Colbert	Mary Crawford Lora Harjo-King Jessina Brown	Randall Hicks Bert Robinson	Grover Wind Carmin Tecumseh-Williams William Lowe Patrick Moore Brian Jones	Rufus Scott Edwin Marshall Anna Marshall	Jerry Wilson Cynthia Tiger Robert Hufft	Dierdra Soap Pamela Snyder-Osmun Charles McHenry Terri Jorgensen

== Nullified Primary Elections ==
On September 21, the primary elections took place with nearly 5,000 voters. On September 28, the election board announced the official results. On October 2, the MCN Supreme Court nullified the results of the MCN Primary Election following receipt of petitions alleging fraud, irregularities, and recount of absentee ballots. The MCN election board announced November 2 as the new primary election date.

=== Principal Chief ===
Candidate	Votes	%
David Hill	1,272	25.44
Bim Steve Bruner	1,039	20.78
Lucian Tiger	1,029	20.58
Monte Randal	617	12.34
Timothy Good Voice	306	6.12
Brenda Golden	261	5.22
Jackie Jackson	168	3.36
George Tiger	135	2.70
Samuel Alexander	125	2.50
Joseph Rogers	48	0.96
Total	5,000	100.00

=== Second Chief ===
Candidate	Votes	%
Del Beaver	3,065	63.05
Adam Jones	1,796	36.95
Total	4,861	100.00

=== National Council ===
District	Candidate	Votes	%
Creek (Seat A)	Dean Hughes	1,819	38.66
Creek (Seat A)	Joseph Hicks	1,492	31.71
Creek (Seat A)	Dode Warrington-Barnett	1,394	29.63
McIntosh (Seat A)	Darrell Proctor	3,180	68.64
McIntosh (Seat A)	Charles Colbert	1,453	31.36
Muskogee (Seat A)	Lora Harjo-King	1,891	41.45
Muskogee (Seat A)	Mary Crawford	1,708	37.44
Muskogee (Seat A)	Jessina Brown	963	21.11
Okfuskee (Seat A)	Randall Hicks	3,031	65.65
Okfuskee (Seat A)	Bert Robison	1,586	34.35
Okmulgee (Seat A)	Carmin Tecumseh-Williams	1,384	28.99
Okmulgee (Seat A)	William Lowe	1,059	22.18
Okmulgee (Seat A)	Grover Wind	1,056	22.12
Okmulgee (Seat A)	Brian Jones	677	14.18
Okmulgee (Seat A)	Patrick Moore	598	12.53
Tukvpvtce (Seat A)	Anna Marshall	1,637	35.00
Tukvpvtce (Seat A)	Rufus Scott	1,596	34.12
Tukvpvtce (Seat A)	Edwin Marshall	1,444	30.87
Tulsa (Seat A)	Robert Hufft	2,974	63.04
Tulsa (Seat A)	Cynthia Tiger	1,053	22.32
Tulsa (Seat A)	Jerry Wilson	691	14.65
Wagoner (Seat A)	Charles McHenry	2,042	43.74
Wagoner (Seat A)	Dierdra Soap	1,410	30.20
Wagoner (Seat A)	Terri Jorgensen	839	17.97
Wagoner (Seat A)	Pamela Snyder-Osmun	378	8.10

== Results ==
The November 2 primary election resulted in no changes in the winner of each race. In the Tulsa District Seat A race, Cynthia Tiger and Jerry Wilson withdrew after the Sept. 21 primary, leaving the incumbent, Robert Hufft as the winner of that race. In the Okfuskee and McIntosh races, the winning candidate received a super majority and avoided the need to participate in the general elections. Del Beaver defeated Adam Jones III 3,480 votes to 1,535 which meant that the second chief election would not be held during the general election.

On December 14, the general election was held and three days later on December 17, 2019 the unofficial final election results were released showing David Hill as the front runner for the Principal Chief race. The results became official on December 20 and on January 1, 2020 winning candidates were sworn in to their position at the MCN Council House in Okmulgee, Oklahoma. On January 4, 2020 an inauguration ceremony was held at the River Spirit Casino Resort to commemorate the election of new Executive Branch leaders.

=== Principal Chief ===
Candidate	Primary		General	
Candidate	Votes	%	Votes	%
David Hill	1,966	38.27	3,399	65.64
Bim Steve Bruner	1,172	22.81	1,779	34.36
Lucian Tiger III	1,161	22.60		
Monte Randal	496	9.66		
Timothy Good Voice	254	4.94		
Samuel Alexander	88	1.71		
Total	5,137	100.00	5,178	100.00

=== Second Chief ===
Candidate	Votes	%
Del Beaver	3,480	69.39
Adam Jones III	1,535	30.61
Total	5,015	100.00

=== National Council ===
District	Candidate	Primary		General	
District	Candidate	Votes	%	Votes	%
Creek (Seat A)	Joseph Hicks	1,760	36.25	2,520	51.54
Creek (Seat A)	Dean Hughes	1,687	34.75	2,369	48.46
Creek (Seat A)	Dode Warrington-Barnett	1,408	29.00		
McIntosh (Seat A)	Darrell Proctor	3,347	69.76		
McIntosh (Seat A)	Charles Colbert	1,451	30.24		
Muskogee (Seat A)	Lora Harjo-King	2,165	45.63	2,403	49.47
Muskogee (Seat A)	Mary Crawford	1,746	36.80	2,454	50.53
Muskogee (Seat A)	Jessina Brown	834	17.58		
Okfuskee (Seat A)	Randall Hicks	3,242	67.39		
Okfuskee (Seat A)	Bert Robison	1,569	32.61		
Okmulgee (Seat A)	Carmin Tecumseh-Williams	1,509	30.83	2,418	49.13
Okmulgee (Seat A)	William Lowe	1,248	25.50	2,504	50.87
Okmulgee (Seat A)	Grover Wind	1,149	23.47		
Okmulgee (Seat A)	Brian Jones	554	11.32		
Okmulgee (Seat A)	Patrick Moore	435	8.89		
Tukvpvtce (Seat A)	Anna Marshall	1,890	39.15	2,846	58.48
Tukvpvtce (Seat A)	Rufus Scott	1,567	32.46	2,021	41.52
Tukvpvtce (Seat A)	Edwin Marshall	1,370	28.38		
Tulsa (Seat A)	Robert Hufft	Unopposed			
Wagoner (Seat A)	Charles McHenry	2,328	48.07	2,775	56.74
Wagoner (Seat A)	Dierdra Soap	1,712	35.35	2,116	43.26
Wagoner (Seat A)	Terri Jorgensen	803	16.58		
