= 2003 United States gubernatorial elections =

- October 4 and 7, and November 6 and 15, 2003

4 governorships (Note: including a recall election in California)
	Majority party	Minority party
Party	Republican	Democratic
Seats before	26	24
Seats after	28	22
Seat change	▲2	▼2
Popular vote	1,743,172 (Note: This excludes the result of the 2003 California gubernatorial recall election.)	1,628,304
Percentage	51.49%	48.09%
Seats up	1	3
Seats won	3	1
- Map of the results Republican gain Democratic gain No election

United States gubernatorial elections were held in four states. Kentucky and Mississippi held their general elections on November 4. Louisiana held the first round of its jungle primary on October 4 and the runoff on November 15. In addition, California held a recall election on October 7.

The Republican Party had a net gain of two seats in 2003, picking up an open seat in Kentucky, removing a Democratic governor in California, and defeating a Democratic governor in Mississippi, while losing an open seat to the Democrats in Louisiana. The election cycle was unusual because every seat that was up for election changed hands. This was the last time a party made net gains in this cycle of gubernatorial elections until 2019.

== Election predictions ==
State	Incumbent	Last race	Sabato September 2, 2003	Result
California (recall)	Gray Davis	47.26% D	Tossup	Schwarzenegger; 48.58% R (flip)
Kentucky	Paul Patton (term-limited)	60.70% D	Lean R (flip)	Fletcher; 55.04% R (flip)
Louisiana	Mike Foster (term-limited)	62.17% R	Lean D (flip)	Blanco; 51.95% D (flip)
Mississippi	Ronnie Musgrove	49.62% D	Tossup	Haley Barbour; 52.59% R (flip)

== Race Summary ==
State	Incumbent	Party	First elected	Result	Candidates
California (recall)	Gray Davis	Democratic	1998	Incumbent recalled. New governor elected. Republican gain.	Vote on recall: ✓ Yes 55.4%; No 44.6%; Replacement candidates: ✓ Arnold Schwarzenegger (Republican) 48.6%; Cruz Bustamante (Democratic) 31.5%; Tom McClintock (Republican) 13.4%; Peter Camejo (Green) 2.8%
Kentucky	Paul Patton	Democratic	1995	Incumbent term-limited. New governor elected. Republican gain.	✓ Ernie Fletcher (Republican) 55.0%; Ben Chandler (Democratic) 45.0%
Louisiana	Mike Foster	Republican	1995	Incumbent term-limited. New governor elected. Democratic gain.	✓ Kathleen Blanco (Democratic) 52.0%; Bobby Jindal (Republican) 48.0%
Mississippi	Ronnie Musgrove	Democratic	1999	Incumbent lost re-election. New governor elected. Republican gain.	✓ Haley Barbour (Republican) 52.6%; Ronnie Musgrove (Democratic) 45.8%

== Closest races ==
States where the margin of victory was under 5%:

1. Louisiana, 3.9%

States where the margin of victory was under 10%:

1. Mississippi, 6.8%

== California (recall) ==
2003 California gubernatorial recall election
- October 7, 2003
- Turnout: 61.20% ▲34.4pp
- Vote on recall
- Shall Gray Davis be recalled (removed) from the office of Governor?

Results
Choice	Votes	%
Yes	4,976,274	55.39%
No	4,007,783	44.61%
Valid votes	8,984,057	95.44%
Invalid or blank votes	429,431	4.56%
Total votes	9,413,488	100.00%
Registered voters/turnout	15,380,536	61.2%
- County results Yes: 50–60% 60–70% 70–80% No: 50–60% 60–70% 70–80% 80–90%
- Replacement candidates

If Davis is recalled, who should replace him as governor?
- Turnout: 61.20%
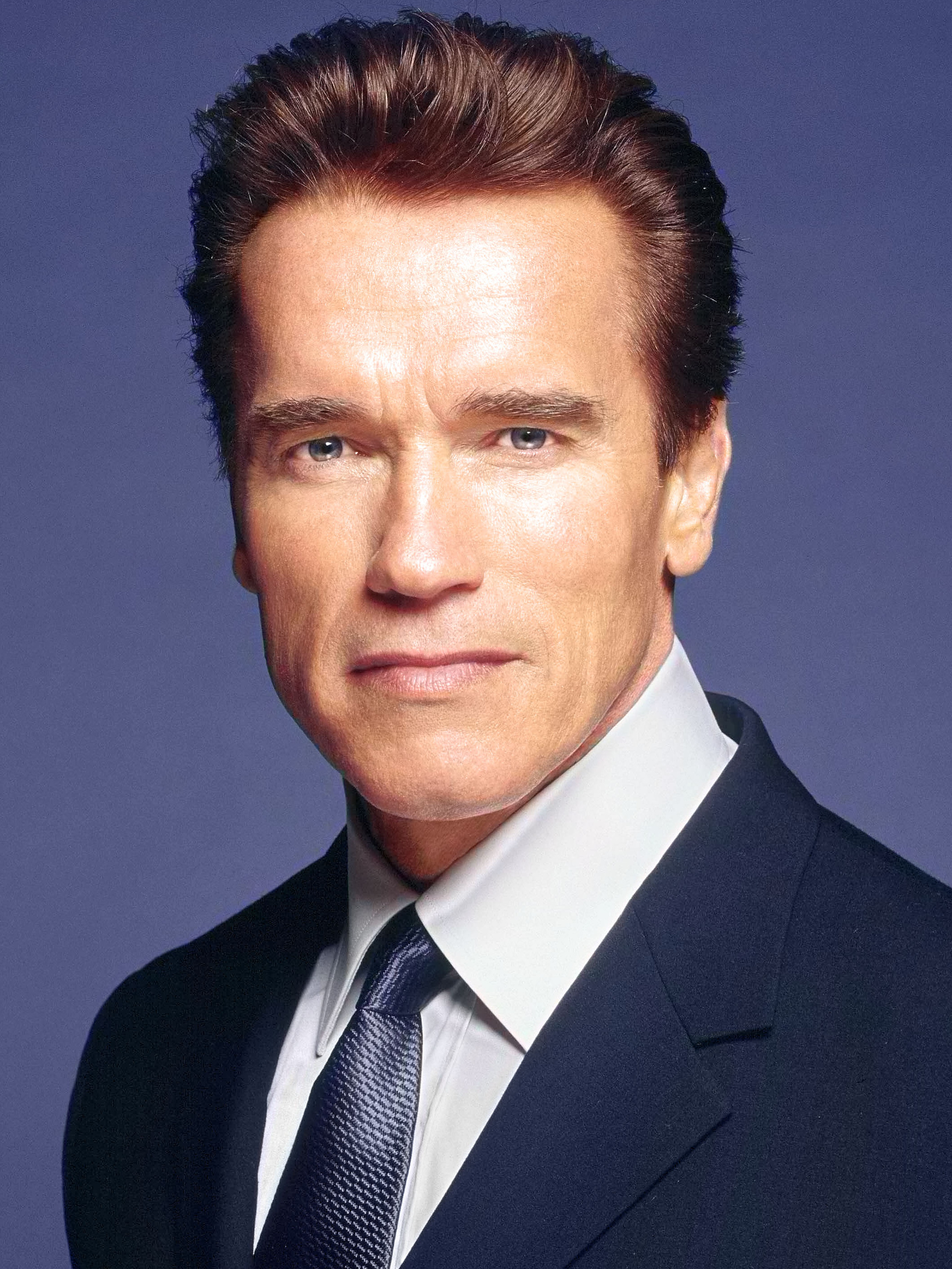

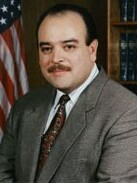

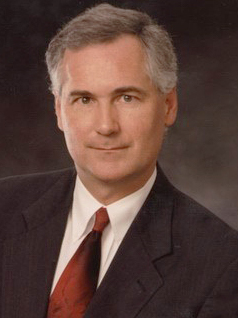
Candidate	Arnold Schwarzenegger	Cruz Bustamante	Tom McClintock
Party	Republican	Democratic	Republican
Popular vote	4,206,284	2,724,874	1,161,287
Percentage	48.6%	31.5%	13.4%
- County results Schwarzenegger: 40–50% 50–60% 60–70% Bustamante: 40–50% 50–60% 60–70%
Governor before election
Gray Davis
Democratic
Governor after election
Arnold Schwarzenegger
Republican

The 2003 California gubernatorial recall election was a special election permitted under California state law. It resulted in voters replacing incumbent Democratic Governor Gray Davis with Republican Arnold Schwarzenegger. The recall effort spanned the latter half of 2003. Seven of the nine previous governors, including Davis, had faced unsuccessful recall attempts.

After several legal and procedural efforts failed to stop it, California's first-ever gubernatorial recall election was held on October 7, and the results were certified on November 14, 2003, making Davis the first governor recalled in the history of California, and just the second in U.S. history (the first was North Dakota's 1921 recall of Lynn Frazier). California is one of 19 states that allow recalls. Nearly 18 years after the 2003 election, California held a second recall election in 2021; however, that recall was unsuccessful, failing to oust Democratic governor Gavin Newsom.

== Kentucky ==
2003 Kentucky gubernatorial election
- November 4, 2003
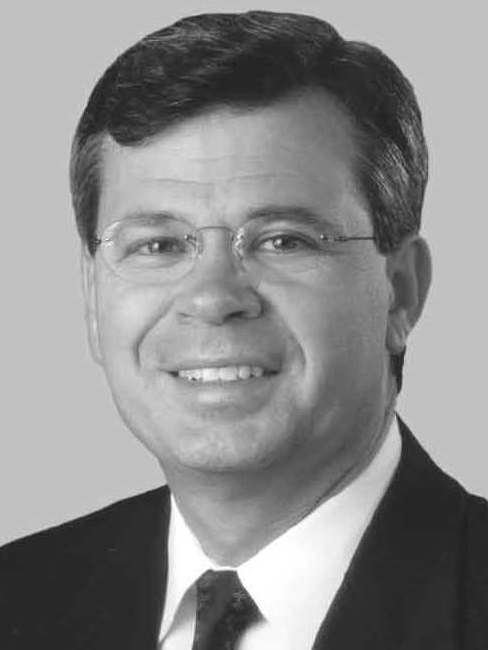

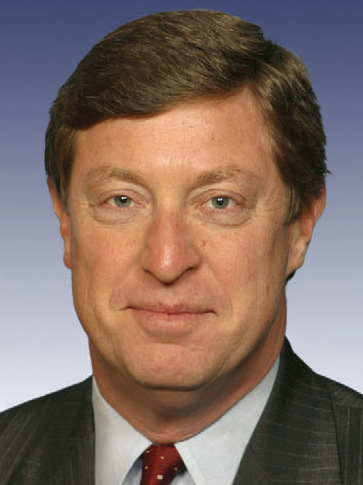
Nominee	Ernie Fletcher	Ben Chandler
Party	Republican	Democratic
Running mate	Steve Pence	Charlie Owen
Popular vote	596,284	487,159
Percentage	55.0%	45.0%
- Fletcher: 50–60% 60–70% 70–80% 80–90% Chandler: 50–60% 60–70% 70–80%
Governor before election
Paul E. Patton
Democratic
Elected Governor
Ernie Fletcher
Republican

The 2003 Kentucky gubernatorial election was held to elect the governor of Kentucky on November 4, 2003. Republican candidate Ernie Fletcher defeated Democrat Ben Chandler and became the first Republican governor of Kentucky in 32 years.

== Louisiana ==
2003 Louisiana gubernatorial election
- October 4, 2003 (first round); November 15, 2003 (runoff)
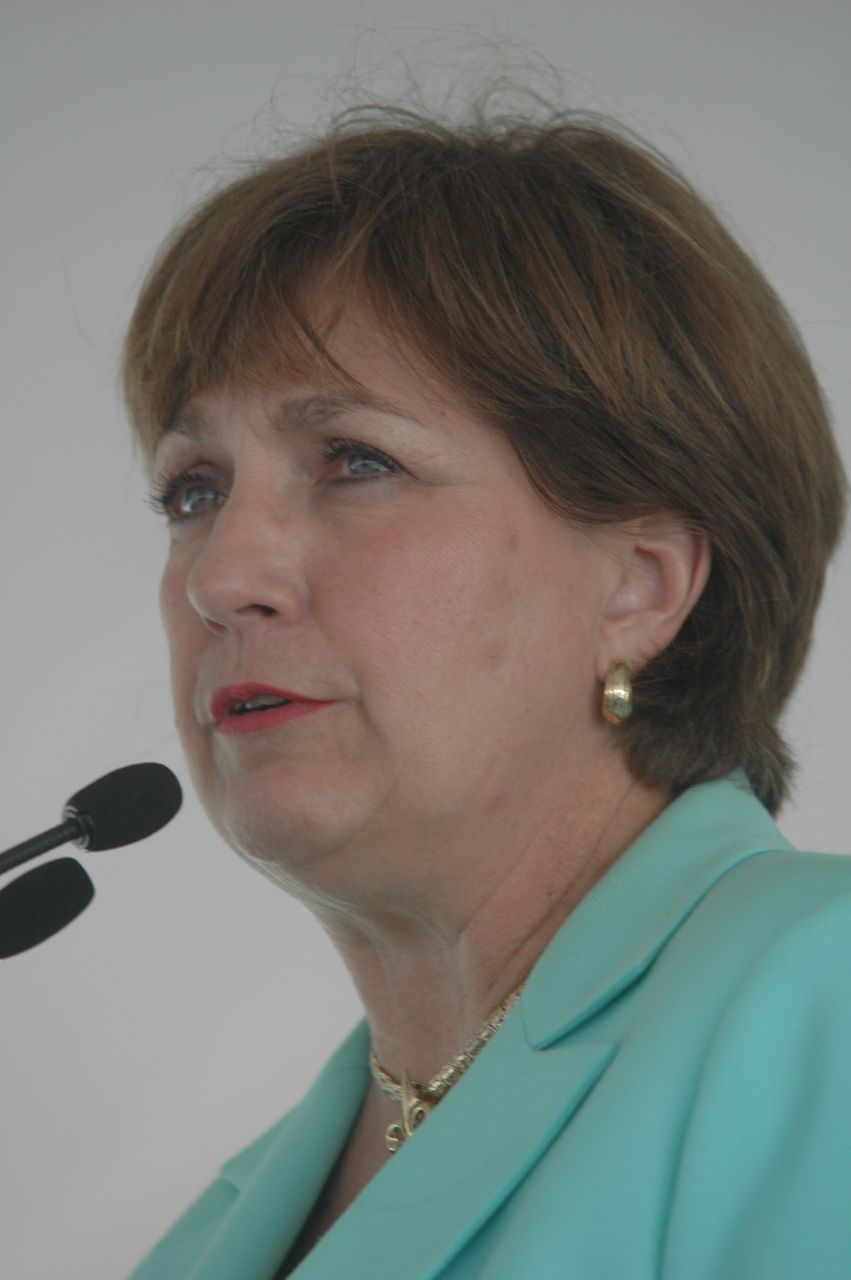

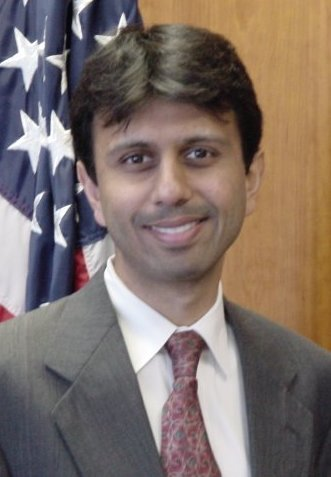

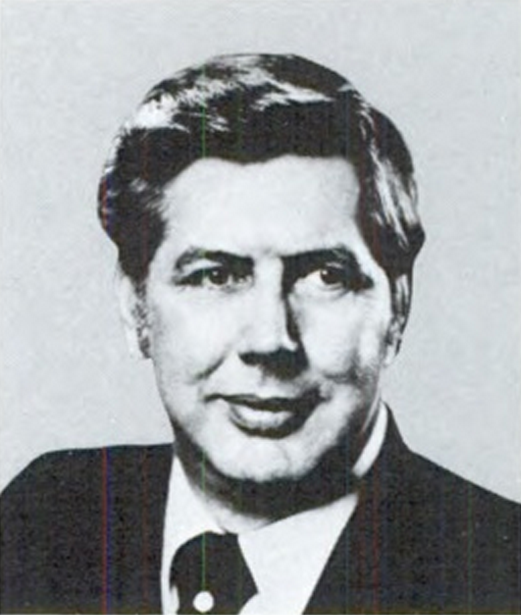

Nominee	Kathleen Blanco	Bobby Jindal	Richard Ieyoub
Party	Democratic	Republican	Democratic
First round	250,136; 18.36%	443,389; 32.54%	223,513; 16.4%
Runoff	731,358; 51.95%	676,484; 48.05%	Eliminated
Nominee	Buddy Leach	Randy Ewing	Hunt Downer
Party	Democratic	Democratic	Republican
First round	187,872; 13.79%	123,936; 9.1%	84,718; 6.22%
Runoff	Eliminated	Eliminated	Eliminated
- Parish results Blanco: 20–30% 30–40% 40–50% 50–60% 60–70% 70–80% Jindal: 20–30% 30–40% 40–50% 50–60% 60–70% 70–80% Ieyoub: 20–30% 30–40% Leach: 20–30% 30–40% 50–60% Ewing: 30–40% 40–50% 50–60% 60–70% Downer: 20–30% 40–50%
Governor before election
Mike Foster
Republican
Elected Governor
Kathleen Blanco
Democratic

The 2003 Louisiana gubernatorial election was held on November 15, 2003, to elect the governor of Louisiana. Incumbent Republican governor Mike Foster was not eligible to run for re-election to a third term because of term limits established by the Louisiana Constitution. As of 2023, this is the most recent Louisiana gubernatorial election in which the first-round winner did not win the runoff.

== Mississippi ==
2003 Mississippi gubernatorial election
- November 4, 2003
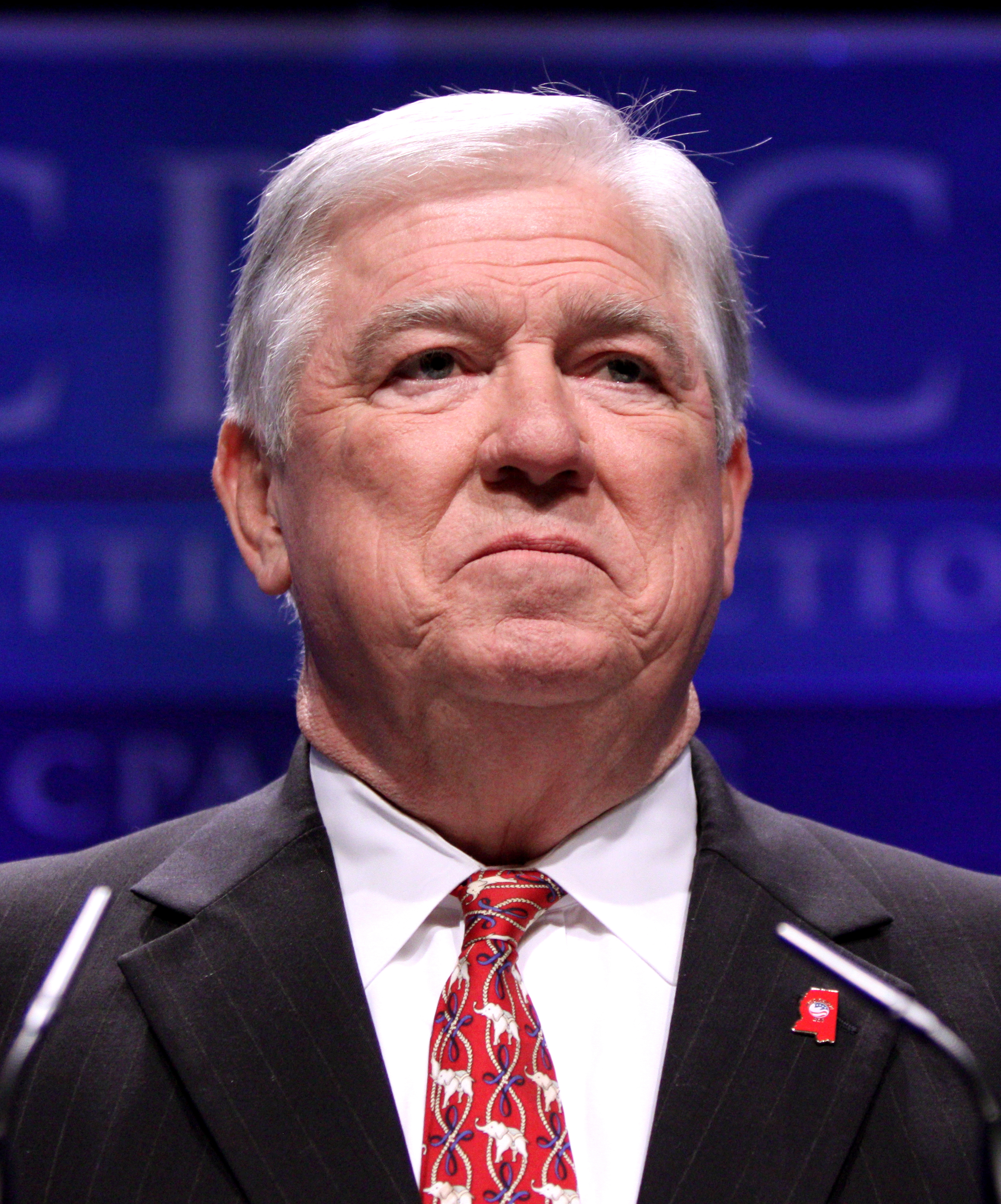

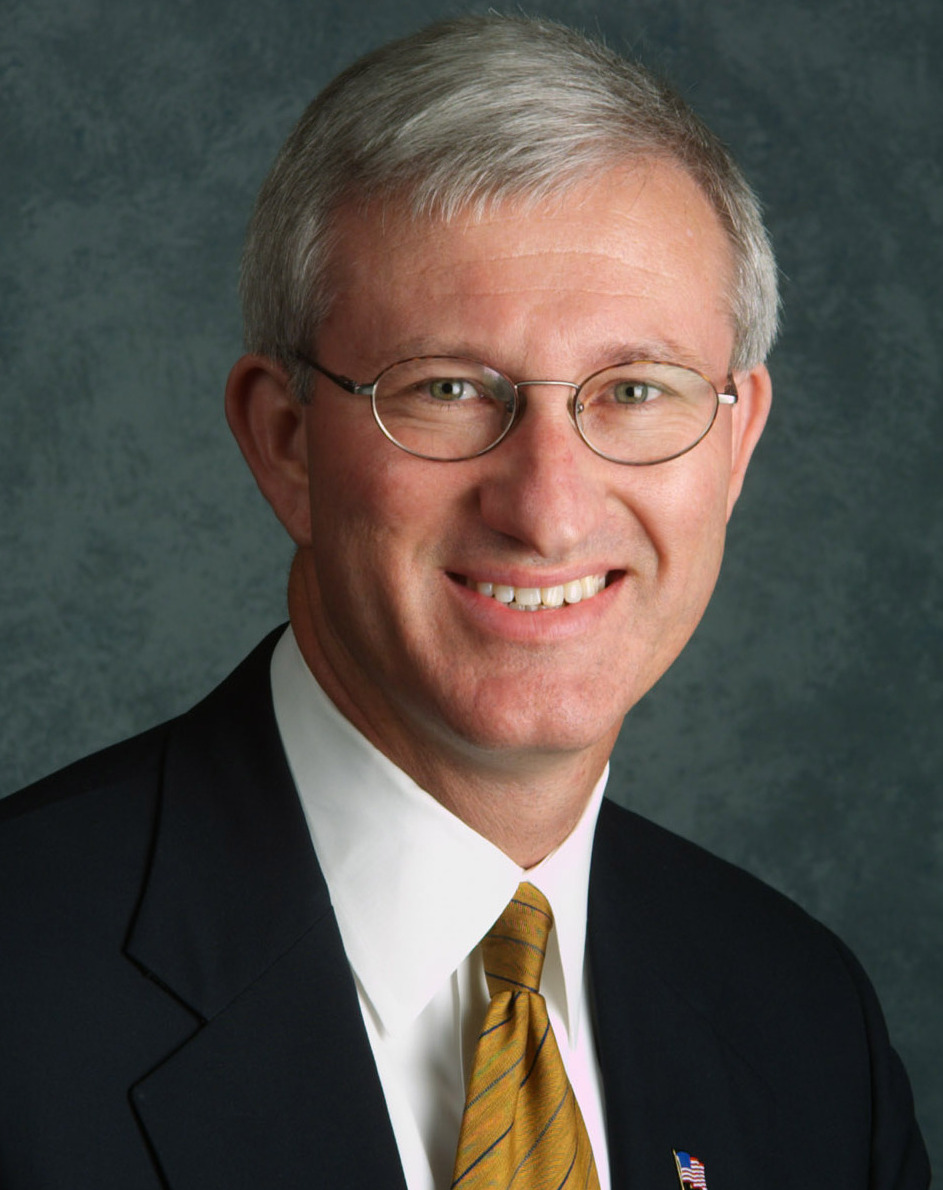
Nominee	Haley Barbour	Ronnie Musgrove
Party	Republican	Democratic
Electoral vote	76	46
Popular vote	470,404	409,787
Percentage	52.59%	45.81%
- County results Barbour: 50–60% 60–70% 70–80% Musgrove: 40–50% 50–60% 60–70% 70–80%
Governor before election
Ronnie Musgrove
Democratic
Elected Governor
Haley Barbour
Republican

The 2003 Mississippi gubernatorial election took place on November 4, 2003, to elect the governor of the U.S. state of Mississippi. Former Republican National Committee chairman Haley Barbour defeated incumbent Democrat Ronnie Musgrove by a margin of 6.78%.

As of 2023, the election remains the most expensive gubernatorial election in state history, with over $18 million having been spent between Barbour and Musgrove. An additional $5 million was spent by the Republican Governors Association, mostly on television advertising. Barbour's victory in the election made him only the second Republican governor of Mississippi since Reconstruction.

== See also ==
- 2003 California gubernatorial recall election
- 2003 Kentucky gubernatorial election
- 2003 Louisiana gubernatorial election
- 2003 Mississippi gubernatorial election
