= David Adams (gridiron football) =

American football player (born 1964)

No. 83, 86, 21, 4
- Position: Running back

Personal information
- Born: June 24, 1964 (age 62); Tucson, Arizona, U.S.
- Listed height: 5 ft 6 in (1.68 m)
- Listed weight: 168 lb (76 kg)

Career information
- High school: Sunnyside (Tucson)
- College: Arizona
- NFL draft: 1987: 12th round, 309th overall pick

Career history
- Indianapolis Colts (1987)*; Dallas Cowboys (1987); Los Angeles Rams (1987); Los Angeles Raiders (1987)*; Los Angeles Rams (1988)*; Hamilton Tiger-Cats (1989–1990)
- * Offseason or practice squad member only

Awards and highlights
- First-team All-Pac-10 (1986); Second-team All-Pac-10 (1984)

Career NFL statistics
- Rushing yards: 49
- Rushing average: 7
- Touchdowns: 1
- Stats at Pro Football Reference

Career CFL statistics
- Games played: 3

David Delaney Adams (born June 24, 1964) is an American former professional football player who was a running back in the National Football League (NFL) for the Dallas Cowboys and Los Angeles Rams. He also was a member of the Hamilton Tiger-Cats in the Canadian Football League (CFL). He was selected by the Indianapolis Colts in the twelfth round (309th overall) of the 1987 NFL draft. He played college football for the Arizona Wildcats.

== Early life ==
Adams attended Sunnyside High School, where he played running back. As a junior, he led the state in yards per carry (12.6), yards per punt return (8.7) and yards per kickoff returns (38), while receiving All-state and All-city honors.

As a senior, he led the city in rushing, while receiving All-state, All-city and player of the year honors (by the Tucson Citizen). He was honorable-mention All-American and played in the North/South All Star Game. During his high school career his teams had a 22–3 overall record.

== College career ==
Adams accepted a football scholarship from the University of Arizona. As a sophomore, he was named the starter, registering 188 carries for 750 yards and 6 touchdowns. As a junior, he was limited with injuries, posting 138 carries for 511 yards and 2 touchdowns.

As a senior, he was the first running back in school history to lead the Pac 10 in rushing (1,175 yards), which ranked fourth in school history. He finished his college career leading his team in rushing for three straight seasons, ranking third in school history in rushing yards (2,571) and second in rushing attempts (600).

== Professional career ==
=== Indianapolis Colts ===
Adams was selected by the Indianapolis Colts in the 12th round (309th overall) of the 1987 NFL draft, after dropping because he was seen too small to play professional football. He was released on September 8.

=== Dallas Cowboys ===
After the NFLPA strike was declared on the third week of the 1987 season, those contests were canceled (reducing the 16-game season to 15) and the NFL decided that the games would be played with replacement players. On September 23, Adams was signed to be a part of the Dallas Cowboys replacement team, that was given the mock name "Rhinestone Cowboys" by the media. He was a backup behind Alvin Blount and Tony Dorsett. Against the New York Jets, he had 5 carries for 43 yards, including a 27-yard touchdown run, and 2 kickoff returns for 23 yards. Against the Philadelphia Eagles, he tallied 2 carries for 6 yards and 3 kickoff returns for 70 yards. Against the Washington Redskins, he had one reception for 8 yards and one kickoff return for 20 yards. He was cut on October 20, at the end of the strike.

=== Los Angeles Rams ===
In 1987, he signed as a free agent with the Los Angeles Rams. He was released on December 17.

=== Los Angeles Raiders ===
In 1988, he signed as a free agent with the Los Angeles Raiders. He was released on August 1.

=== Hamilton Tiger-Cats ===
On April 13, 1989, he was signed by the Hamilton Tiger-Cats of the Canadian Football League. He appeared in one game, posting 3 carries for 2 yards. In 1990, he appeared in 3 games, tallying 19 carries for 65 yards and one touchdown.

== Personal life ==
Adams is the uncle of basketball player Bryce Cotton.
