= Drexel-Alvernon, Arizona =

CDP in Pima County, Arizona

- Former CDP
- Location in Pima County and the state of Arizona
- Coordinates: 32°8′44″N 110°54′5″W
- Country: United States
- State: Arizona
- County: Pima

Area
  - Total: 0.93 sq mi (2.4 km^{2})
  - Land: 0.93 sq mi (2.4 km^{2})
  - Water: 0 sq mi (0.0 km^{2})

Population (2000)
  - Total: 4,192
  - Density: 4,524/sq mi (1,746.7/km^{2})
- Time zone: UTC-7 (MST (no DST))
- FIPS code: 04-20505

Drexel-Alvernon was a census-designated place (CDP) in Pima County, Arizona, United States. The population was 4,192 at the 2000 census.

== Geography ==
Drexel-Alvernon is located at 32°8′44″N 110°54′5″W (32.145653, -110.901428).

According to the United States Census Bureau, the CDP has a total area of 0.9 square miles (2.3 km^{2}), all land.

== Demographics ==
At the 2000 census there were 4,192 people, 1,328 households, and 988 families living in the CDP. The population density was 4,538.7 inhabitants per square mile (1,752.4/km^{2}). There were 1,417 housing units at an average density of 1,534.2 per square mile (592.4/km^{2}). The racial makeup of the CDP was 56.6% White, 5.1% Black or African American, 2.0% Native American, 0.6% Asian, 0.1% Pacific Islander, 31.5% from other races, and 4.2% from two or more races. 58.1% of the population were Hispanic or Latino of any race. Of the 1,328 households 39.7% had children under the age of 18 living with them, 51.4% were married couples living together, 16.6% had a female householder with no husband present, and 25.6% were non-families. 19.2% of households were one person and 4.7% were one person aged 65 or older. The average household size was 3.16 and the average family size was 3.65.

The age distribution was 32.2% under the age of 18, 11.1% from 18 to 24, 29.5% from 25 to 44, 20.7% from 45 to 64, and 6.5% 65 or older. The median age was 30 years. For every 100 females, there were 96.6 males. For every 100 females age 18 and over, there were 96.7 males.

The median household income was $30,972 and the median family income was $36,019. Males had a median income of $23,699 versus $20,060 for females. The per capita income for the CDP was $11,068. About 16.5% of families and 18.5% of the population were below the poverty line, including 25.0% of those under age 18 and 19.8% of those age 65 or over.

== Governmental representation ==
The CDP is in Arizona's 3rd Congressional District, served by Representative Raúl Grijalva and Arizona's 2nd State Legislative District, served by Representatives John Christopher Ackerley and Rosanna Gabaldón, and by Senator Andrea d'Alessandro, all Democrats.

== Education ==
The section of the CDP east of Belvedere Avenue and the section southwest of Benson Highway are served by Craycroft Elementary School and Billy Lane Lauffer Middle School and the rest of the CDP by Los Niños Elementary School and Challenger Middle School. For secondary education, the CDP is served by Desert View High School. All schools are part of the Sunnyside Unified School District.
