= Summit, Arizona =

CDP in Pima County, Arizona

- CDP
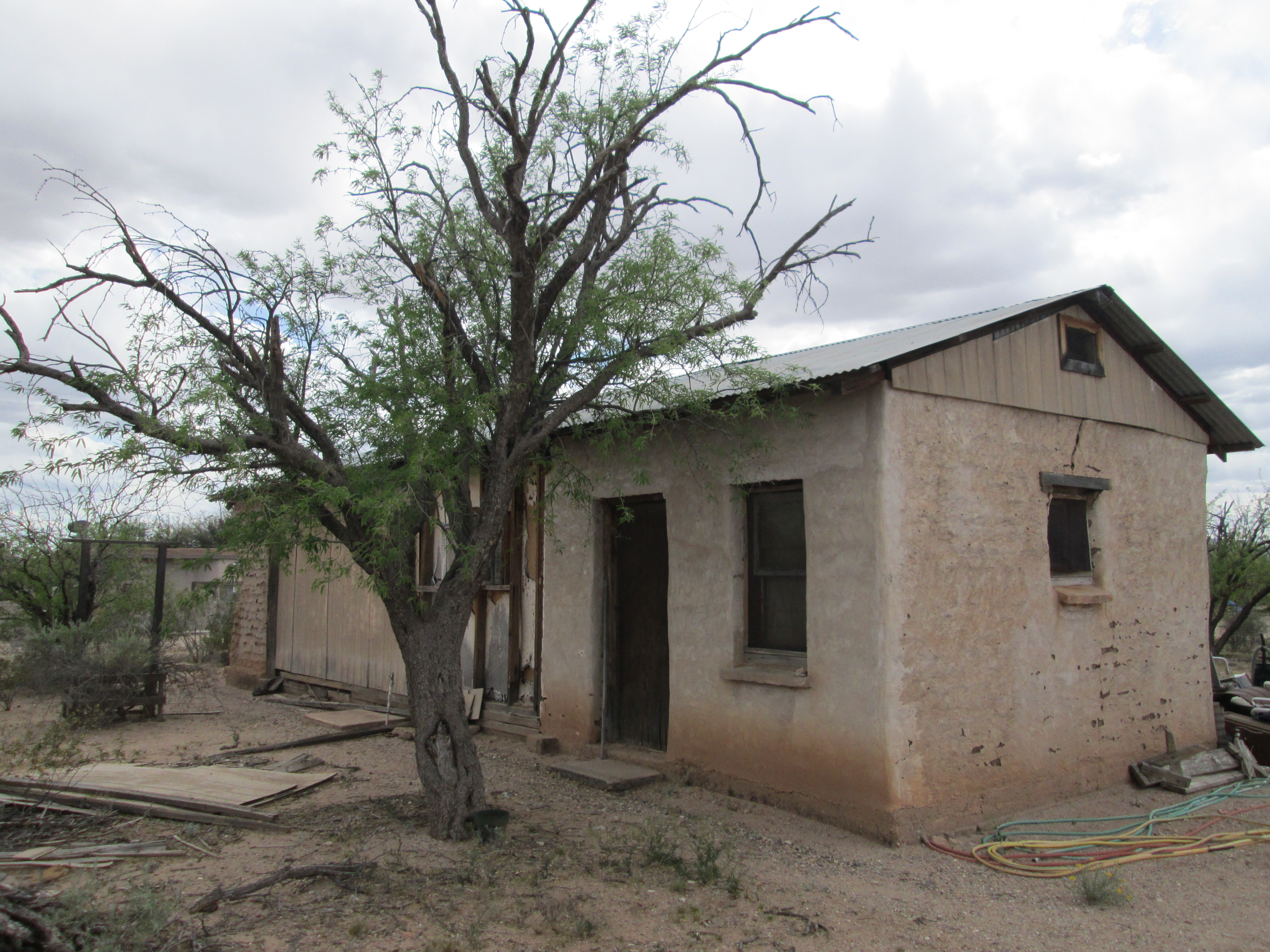
- An old adobe ranch house in Summit.

- Location in Pima County and the state of Arizona

- Location in the United States
- Coordinates: 32°3′48″N 110°56′37″W
- Country: United States
- State: Arizona
- County: Pima

Area
  - Total: 3.66 sq mi (9.48 km^{2})
  - Land: 3.66 sq mi (9.48 km^{2})
  - Water: 0 sq mi (0.00 km^{2})
- Elevation: 2,621 ft (799 m)

Population (2020)
  - Total: 4,724
  - Density: 1,291.0/sq mi (498.47/km^{2})
- Time zone: UTC-7 (MST (no DST))
- FIPS code: 04-70240
- GNIS feature ID: 1853167

Summit is a census-designated place (CDP) in Pima County, Arizona, United States. The population was 3,702 at the 2000 census.

== Geography ==
According to the United States Census Bureau, the CDP has a total area of 10.1 square miles (26 km^{2}), all land.

== Demographics ==
Historical population
Census	Pop.	Note	%±
2020	4,724		—
U.S. Decennial Census

=== 2020 census ===
As of the 2020 census, Summit had a population of 4,724. The median age was 31.5 years. 28.8% of residents were under the age of 18 and 10.6% of residents were 65 years of age or older. For every 100 females there were 104.6 males, and for every 100 females age 18 and over there were 106.3 males age 18 and over.

87.5% of residents lived in urban areas, while 12.5% lived in rural areas.

There were 1,403 households in Summit, of which 42.8% had children under the age of 18 living in them. Of all households, 48.3% were married-couple households, 21.5% were households with a male householder and no spouse or partner present, and 22.8% were households with a female householder and no spouse or partner present. About 19.0% of all households were made up of individuals and 8.1% had someone living alone who was 65 years of age or older.

There were 1,560 housing units, of which 10.1% were vacant. The homeowner vacancy rate was 0.7% and the rental vacancy rate was 9.7%.

Racial composition as of the 2020 census
Race	Number	Percent
White	1,551	32.8%
Black or African American	28	0.6%
American Indian and Alaska Native	104	2.2%
Asian	24	0.5%
Native Hawaiian and Other Pacific Islander	3	0.1%
Some other race	1,527	32.3%
Two or more races	1,487	31.5%
Hispanic or Latino (of any race)	3,944	83.5%

=== 2000 census ===
At the 2000 census, there were 3,702 people, 1,144 households, and 871 families living in the CDP. The population density was 365.8 inhabitants per square mile (141.2/km^{2}). There were 1,259 housing units at an average density of 124.4 per square mile (48.0/km^{2}). The racial makeup of the CDP was 65.9% White, 0.5% Black or African American, 2.2% Native American, 0.1% Asian, <0.1% Pacific Islander, 26.0% from other races, and 5.3% from two or more races. 63.5% of the population were Hispanic or Latino of any race. Of the 1,144 households, 46.7% had children under the age of 18 living with them, 55.6% were married couples living together, 13.4% had a female householder with no husband present, and 23.8% were non-families. 18.4% of households were one person and 5.9% were one person aged 65 or older. The average household size was 3.24 and the average family size was 3.68.

The age distribution was 34.8% under the age of 18, 10.0% from 18 to 24, 29.8% from 25 to 44, 18.4% from 45 to 64, and 6.9% 65 or older. The median age was 29 years. For every 100 females, there were 107.3 males. For every 100 females age 18 and over, there were 103.7 males.

The median household income was $28,485 and the median family income was $31,806. Males had a median income of $21,316 versus $21,333 for females. The per capita income for the CDP was $11,274. About 22.0% of families and 26.2% of the population were below the poverty line, including 42.9% of those under age 18 and 9.0% of those age 65 or over.

== Education ==
The CDP is in the Sunnyside Unified School District.
