= Isidro Lopez (Tohono O'odham leader) =

American tribal leader

Isidro Bernard Lopez (born April 26, 1968) is an American tribal leader who has served as the Vice Chairman of the Tohono O'odham Nation of southern Arizona since 2007.

During the 2007 Tohono O'odham election, Ned Norris Jr., who was running for chairman, chose Isidro Lopez as his running mate for vice chairman. The combined Norris-Lopez ticket defeated incumbent Chairwoman Vivian Juan-Saunders, who was seeking a second term in office.

Lopez was sworn in as Vice Chairman of the Tohono O'odham Nation on August 3, 2007.
