= Ned Norris Jr. =

Chairman of the Tohono O'odham

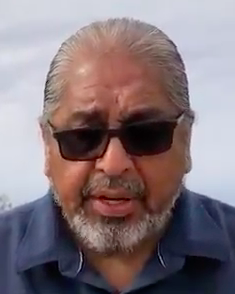

Chairman of the Tohono O'odham
- In office August 3, 2007 – May 28, 2015
- Vice President: Wavalene M. Romero (since 2011); Isidro Lopez (2007–2011)
- Preceded by: Vivian Juan-Saunders
- Succeeded by: Edward D. Manuel

Personal details
- Born: 1955 (age 70–71)
- Party: Democrat
- Spouse: Janice Norris
- Children: Three
- Occupation: Politician

Ned Norris Jr. (born 1955) is chairman of the Tohono O'odham Nation of southern Arizona. He previously held the office for two consecutive terms from 2007 to 2015, and was returned to the office in 2019. Norris previously worked as the director of marketing and public relations for the O'odham Gaming Authority.

== Biography ==
=== Early life ===
Ned Norris Jr. was born in 1955 and raised in Tucson, Arizona. Norris attended both elementary school and middle school in Flagstaff, Arizona before graduating from Sunnyside High School in Tucson. He received a certification in social work from Pima Community College and enrolled at some classes at the University of Arizona, where he later was awarded an honorary Human of Letters doctorate.

=== Career ===
Norris began working for the government of the Tohono O'odham nation in 1978 as a nonattorney tribal judge. He served as a trial judge until 1993. He also served on the school board of the Sunnyside Unified School District in Pima County, Arizona, from 1997 until 2000.

Additionally, Norris was employed as the director of public relations and marketing for the Tohono O'odham Gaming Authority. He resigned from this position in 2003 when he was elected the Vice Chairman of the Tohono O'odham nation. Norris has also worked for the Desert Diamond Casino as assistant director of public relations.

=== Vice Chairman of the Tohono O'odham (2003–2006) ===
In 1999, Vivian Juan-Saunders announced her intention to challenge incumbent Tohono O'odham Chairman Edward Manuel, who was seeking a second term in office. Juan-Saunders chose Norris as her running mate in the election. Manuel defeated Juan-Saunders to win a second term as chairman.

In 2003, Vivian Juan-Saunders once again sought the chairmanship with Ned Norris Jr. as her running mate. She and Norris won the election with 59% of the vote in a rematch with Edward Manuel, who was seeking a third term. Norris became the Vice Chairman of the Tohono O'odham under Chairman Vivian Juan-Saunders, the first woman to lead the Tohono O'odham. He held the post until his resignation in June 2006.

=== Chairman of the Tohono O'odham (2007–2015, 2019–) ===
Video featuring Norris about protecting Tohono O'odham burial grounds in 2020.

In 2007, Norris challenged incumbent Chairman Juan-Saunders in the Tohono O'odham executive election. Norris ousted Juan-Saunders in the election, which was held on May 26, 2007. He received 1,766 of the 3,105 total votes cast by Tohono O'odham voters. His running mate, Isidro Lopez, became the Vice Chairman of the Tohono O'odham. Norris and Lopez were formally inaugurated as Chairman and Vice Chairman of the Tohono O'odham Nation on Friday, August 3, 2007.

He announced that his priorities as Chairman are to attract college educated Tohono O'odham back to the reservation, as well as focus on health care and the alleviation of unemployment.

In 2011, Norris announced his candidacy for re-election as chairman. Wavalene Marie Romero, a Tohono O'odham councilwoman, is Norris' running mate for vice chairman. Vice Chairman Isidro Lopez chose to retire rather than seek a second term.

On Saturday, May 28, 2011, Ned Norris Jr. was re-elected to a second term as Chairman of the Tohono O'odham Nation. The total number of votes was 3,729. Norris received 2,238 votes defeating Juan-Saunders who received 1,491 votes.

In May 2015, Norris and his running mate Romero were defeated by former Chairman Edward D. Manuel by 213 votes.

In May 2019, Norris won a runoff election to defeat Manuel and to return to the office of Chairman.
