= Sunnyside High School (Tucson, Arizona) =

Secondary school in Arizona, United States

- Home of the Fighting Blue Devils

Location
- 1725 East Bilby Road; Tucson, Arizona 85706; United States; 32°08′34″N 110°56′41″W

Information
- School type: Public
- Established: 1955 (71 years ago)
- School district: Sunnyside Unified School District #12
- CEEB code: 030525
- Principal: Stephanie Ponce
- Teaching staff: 98.45 (FTE)
- Grades: 9–12
- Enrollment: 2,221 (2023–2024)
- Student to teacher ratio: 22.56
- Colors: Royal blue and white
- Fight song: O Sunnyside!
- Mascot: Blue Devils (Name: Sunny)
- Rival: Desert View High School
- Publication: Blue Devil News
- Newspaper: The Devillaire
- Website: sunnyside.susd12.org

Sunnyside High School, opened in 1955, is home to two thousand students located on the south side of Tucson, Arizona. Sunnyside offers a variety of extracurricular programs, advanced placement courses, and specialized career and technical training programs. It is a part of the Sunnyside Unified School District.

== History ==
Sunnyside High School opened in 1955 with 9th and 10th grade classes.

The original mascot logo for Sunnyside used a variation of Arizona State University's Sparky mascot. The school was forced to change after the university learned of this use when Sunnyside played a championship game at ASU's Sun Devil Stadium.

=== Athletics ===
Sunnyside High School is a member of the Arizona Interscholastic Association and is classed in its 6A conference. A wrestling powerhouse in Arizona, Sunnyside has won 30 state championships (14 in a row, 1998–2011). It lost a dual-meet December 12, 2015, where Green Valley (NV) snapped a 314 win streak stretching from 1999 to then, and only has lost ten since 1969. However, Sunnyside Wrestling regained its championship title in 2018. The teams are known as the Sunnyside Blue Devils. Athletic teams are fielded in boys volleyball, baseball, basketball, cheerleading, cross country, football, golf, soccer, softball, tennis, track and field, volleyball, wrestling, and swimming. Their girls' basketball team won region in the 2023/24 season and was ranked #1 in the 6a state division.

The varsity football team was featured on the Great American Rivalries Series in 2009 against Salpointe Catholic High School.

==== Arizona State Championship titles ====
- Boys Basketball: 1993 (4A)
- Football: 2001 (4A), 2003 (4A)
- Wrestling: 1979, 1981, 1982, 1983, 1984, 1985, 1986, 1987, 1988, 1990, 1991, 1992, 1993, 1994, 1996, 1998, 1999, 2000, 2001, 2002, 2003, 2004, 2005, 2006, 2007, 2008, 2009, 2010, 2011, 2013, 2018, 2019, 2020, 2021,2022,2023
- Cheerleading: 2000
- Softball: 2007
- Boys Cross-Country: 1966, 1975, 2008
- Boys Soccer: 2019
- Girls Volleyball: 1990.

== Notable alumni ==
- David Adams, former NFL player
- Raul Grijalva, Representative for Arizona's 3rd congressional district
- Harry Holt, former NFL player
- Matthew Lopez, professional UFC fighter; RFA most wins and finishes in history; Sunnyside's first 4x state wrestling champion
- Ned Norris, Jr., Chairman of the Tohono O'odham Nation since 2007
- Mike Scurlock, former NFL player
- Michael Smith, former NFL player
- James Terry, professional MMA fighter
- Roman Bravo Young, freestyle and folkstyle wrestler, two-time NCAA champion for Penn State University
- Anthony Echemendia, freestyle wrestler, one-time Big 12 Champion for Iowa State Cyclones wrestling
- Sergio Vega, freestyle wrestler, wrestles for Oklahoma State Cowboys wrestling

== See also ==
- Desert View High School
- Sunnyside Unified School District
