= 2019 United States gubernatorial elections =

- November 5, 2019; October 12 (Louisiana); November 16 (Louisiana runoff)

3 governorships
	Majority party	Minority party
Party	Republican	Democratic
Seats before	27	23
Seats after	26	24
Seat change	▼1	▲1
Popular vote	1,898,436	1,898,756
Percentage	49.48%	49.49%
Seats up	2	1
Seats won	1	2
- Map of the results Democratic gain Republican hold Democratic hold No election

United States gubernatorial elections were held on November 5, 2019, in Kentucky and Mississippi, and on October 12, 2019, with a runoff on November 16, in Louisiana. These elections formed part of the 2019 United States elections. The last regular gubernatorial elections for all three states were in 2015. The Democrats had to defend an incumbent in Louisiana, while the Republicans had to defend an incumbent in Kentucky plus an open seat in Mississippi. Though all three seats up were in typically Republican states, the election cycle became unexpectedly competitive: Kentucky and Louisiana were seen as highly contested races; and Mississippi's race ultimately became closer than usual, despite being seen as favorable for the Republicans.

Democrats were able to hold their seat in Louisiana and flip the governor's seat in Kentucky, while Republicans successfully kept the Mississippi governorship by winning the open seat. As a result, the Democrats gained a net of one seat, bringing the total number of Democratic governors to 24, while Republicans were reduced to 26 governors, continuing a streak of governor's seat gains by Democrats made under Republican President Donald Trump that began in 2017.

This is the first time since 2003 in which a party made a net gain of seats in this cycle of governorships, and the first time since 1991 that Kentucky and Louisiana elected candidates of the same party. Democrats also won the total popular vote for gubernatorial elections for the third year in a row, and for the first time since 1991 in this cycle of governorships, albeit by an extremely narrow margin of 320 votes, or 0.01%. Additionally, these are the first gubernatorial elections since 1981 in which all of the margins of victory were under ten points.

Until 2026, this was the last time an incumbent Republican governor lost re-election. It is also the last time where the Democrats won the governorship in Louisiana.

== Pre-election composition ==
Kentucky and Louisiana were seen as the two competitive races in this cycle.

Kentucky governor Matt Bevin had very low approval ratings over issues such as Medicare expansion, pensions, and education. Bevin was the least popular governor in the United States, with only a 33% approval rating, in April 2019. When teachers walked out to protest education funding, Bevin blamed them for child molestation and called them "selfish thugs". Bevin also attempted to roll back the state's Medicare expansion, which would've lead to 500,000 people in the state losing their health insurance, and the measure was deeply unpopular in Kentucky and never passed.

In Louisiana, Democratic incumbent John Bel Edwards was popular in the deep red state, as he had worked across the aisle with a number of issues such as abortion. Edwards also brought Medicaid expansion to the state, a move that garnered praise and was popular. Even though Edwards was popular, the sheer amount of Republicans in the state made the race competitive.

Mississippi, whose governor was term-limited, was one of the most Republican states in the country and hadn't voted a Democrat as governor since 1999, and Republican Tate Reeves was a long serving public servant in the state. However, a formidable campaign by Democrat Jim Hood made the race closer than initially expected. Hood made bringing Medicaid expansion to Mississippi the central issue of his campaign, which resonated with voters in the state as many people wanted improvements to health care.

== Election predictions ==
Several sites and individuals publish predictions of competitive seats. These predictions look at factors such as the strength of the incumbent (if the incumbent is running for re-election), the strength of the candidates, and the partisan leanings of the state (reflected in part by the state's Cook Partisan Voting Index rating). The predictions assign ratings to each state, with the rating indicating the predicted advantage that a party has in winning that seat.

Most election predictors use:

- "tossup": no advantage
- "tilt" (used by some predictors): advantage that is not quite as strong as "lean"
- "lean": slight advantage
- "likely": significant, but surmountable, advantage
- "safe" or "solid": near-certain chance of victory

State	PVI	Incumbent	Last race	Cook Oct 15, 2019	IE Nov 8, 2019	Sabato Nov 14, 2019	Result
Kentucky	R+15	Matt Bevin	52.52% R	Tossup	Tossup	Lean R	Beshear; 49.20% D (flip)
Louisiana	R+11	John Bel Edwards	56.11% D	Tossup	Tossup	Lean D	Edwards; 51.33% D
Mississippi	R+9	Phil Bryant (term-limited)	66.24% R	Lean R	Lean R	Lean R	Reeves; 51.91% R

== Race summary ==
=== Results ===
State	Incumbent	Party	First elected	Result	Candidates
Kentucky	Matt Bevin	Republican	2015	Incumbent lost re-election. New governor elected. Democratic gain.	▌ ✓ Andy Beshear (Democratic) 49.2%; ▌Matt Bevin (Republican) 48.8%; ▌John Hicks (Libertarian) 2.0%
Louisiana	John Bel Edwards	Democratic	2015	Incumbent re-elected.	▌ ✓ John Bel Edwards (Democratic) 51.3%; ▌Eddie Rispone (Republican) 48.7%
Mississippi	Phil Bryant	Republican	2011	Incumbent term-limited. New governor elected. Republican hold.	▌ ✓ Tate Reeves (Republican) 51.9%; ▌Jim Hood (Democratic) 46.8%; ▌David Singletary (Independent) 1.0%

== Closest states ==
States where the margin of victory was under 1%:

1. Kentucky, 0.37%

States where the margin of victory was between 1% and 5%:

1. Louisiana, 2.66%

States where the margin of victory was between 5% and 10%:

1. Mississippi, 5.08%

Red denotes states won by Republicans. Blue denotes states won by Democrats.

== Kentucky ==
2019 Kentucky gubernatorial election
- November 5, 2019
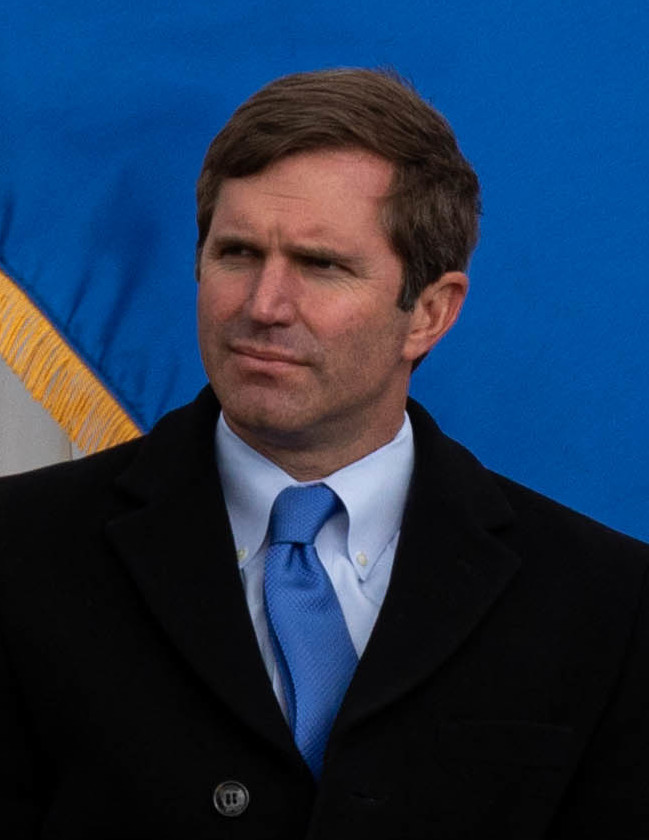

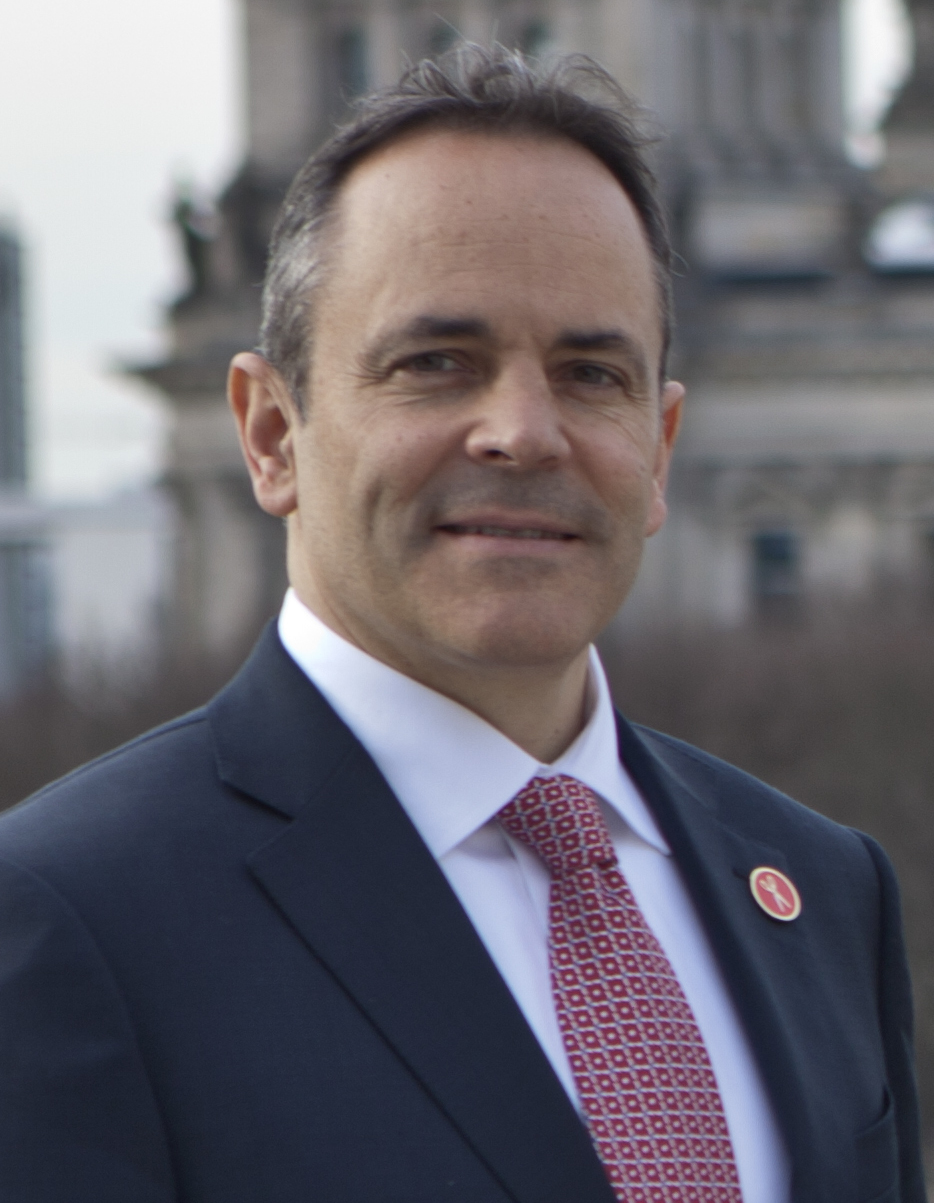
Nominee	Andy Beshear	Matt Bevin
Party	Democratic	Republican
Running mate	Jacqueline Coleman	Ralph Alvarado
Popular vote	709,890	704,754
Percentage	49.2%	48.8%
- County results Beshear: 40–50% 50–60% 60–70% Bevin: 40–50% 50–60% 60–70% 70–80%
Governor before election
Matt Bevin
Republican
Elected Governor
Andy Beshear
Democratic

The Democratic nominee, Kentucky Attorney General Andy Beshear, defeated Republican incumbent Matt Bevin by a margin of just over 5,000 votes, or 0.37%, making this the closest gubernatorial election in Kentucky since 1899 by votes, and the closest ever by percentage.

Bevin won 97 counties, while Beshear won only 23 counties. Beshear carried only two of the state's six congressional districts, but those districts were the state's two most urbanized, the Louisville-based 3rd and the Lexington-based 6th.

Bevin conceded on November 14, after a recanvass took place that day that did not materially change the vote count. Libertarian John Hicks also qualified for the ballot and received 2% of the vote. Statewide turnout was just over 42%, much higher than for the 2015 gubernatorial election. The result was a major swing from 2016, when Donald Trump won the state by 30 points and Republicans gained a supermajority in both chambers of the Kentucky General Assembly.

Kentucky Republican primary
Party	Candidate	Votes	%
Republican	Matt Bevin (incumbent)	136,060	52.36
Republican	Robert Goforth	101,343	38.99
Republican	William Woods	14,004	5.39
Republican	Ike Lawrence	8,447	3.25
Total votes		259,854	100.00

Kentucky Democratic primary
Party	Candidate	Votes	%
Democratic	Andy Beshear	149,438	37.88
Democratic	Rocky Adkins	125,970	31.93
Democratic	Adam Edelen	110,159	27.92
Democratic	Geoff Young	8,923	2.26
Total votes		394,490	100.00

Kentucky general election
Party	Candidate	Votes	%	±%
Democratic	Andy Beshear	709,890	49.20%	+5.38
Republican	Matt Bevin (incumbent)	704,754	48.83	–3.72
Libertarian	John Hicks	28,433	1.97	N/A
Total votes		1,443,077	100.00%	
Democratic gain from Republican				

== Louisiana ==
2019 Louisiana gubernatorial election
- November 16, 2019
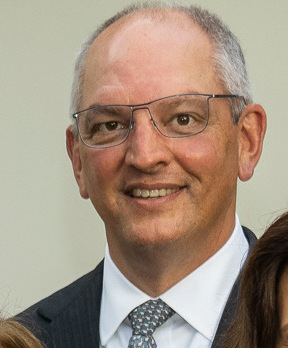

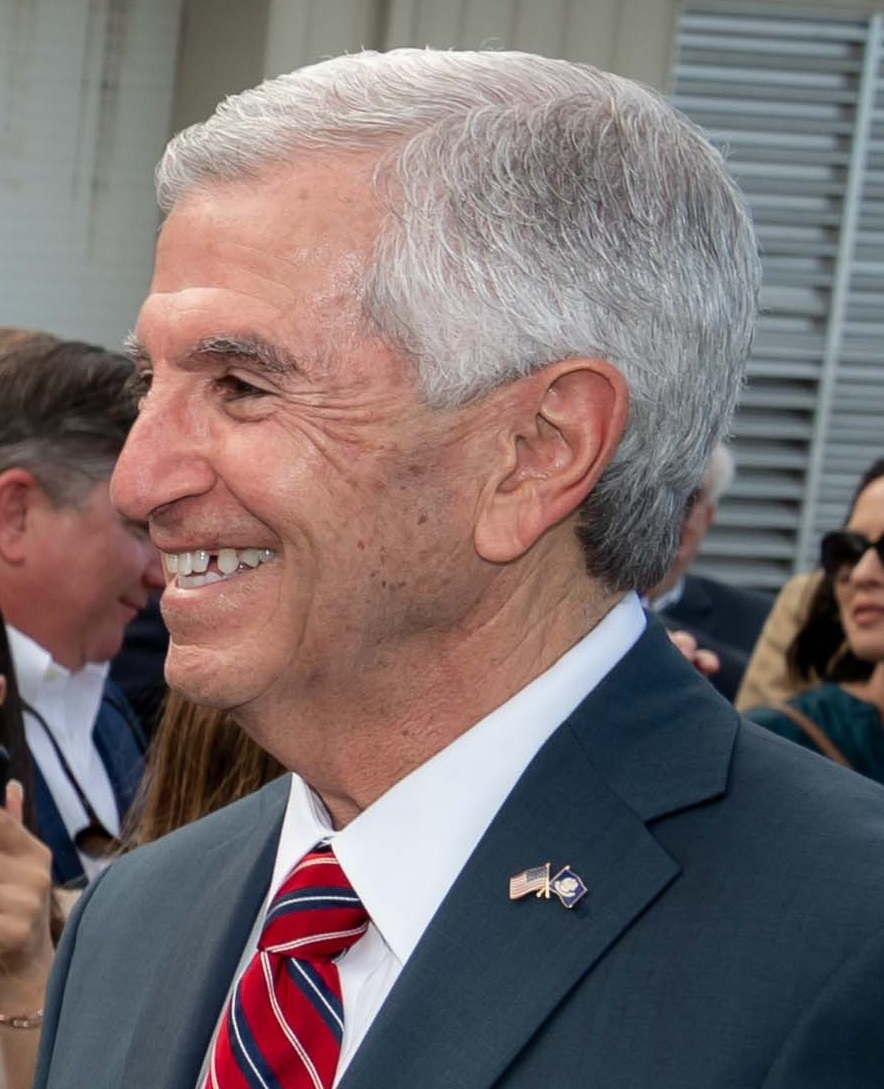
Nominee	John Bel Edwards	Eddie Rispone
Party	Democratic	Republican
Popular vote	774,498	734,268
Percentage	51.3%	48.7%
- Parish results Edwards: 50–60% 60–70% 70–80% 80–90% Rispone: 50–60% 60–70% 70–80% 80–90%
Governor before election
John Bel Edwards
Democratic
Elected Governor
John Bel Edwards
Democratic

Incumbent Democratic governor John Bel Edwards won reelection to a second term, defeating Republican businessman Eddie Rispone. Edwards became the first Louisiana Democrat to secure consecutive terms since Edwin Edwards (no relation to John Bel Edwards) in 1975. It was the closest Louisiana gubernatorial election since 1979.

Under Louisiana's jungle primary system, all candidates appear on the same ballot, regardless of party, and voters may vote for any candidate, regardless of their party affiliation. Because no candidate received an absolute majority of the vote during the primary election on October 12, 2019, a runoff election was held on November 16, 2019, between the top two candidates in the primary, Edwards and Rispone. Louisiana is the only state that has a jungle primary system (California and Washington have a similar top-two primary system).

According to the Louisiana Secretary of State more than 384,000 early votes were cast, a significant increase from the 2015 gubernatorial election in which 234,000 early votes were cast.

Louisiana blanket primary
Party	Candidate	Votes	%
Democratic	John Bel Edwards (incumbent)	625,970	46.59
Republican	Eddie Rispone	368,319	27.42
Republican	Ralph Abraham	317,149	23.61
Democratic	Oscar Dantzler	10,993	0.82
Republican	Patrick Landry	10,966	0.82
Independent	Gary Landrieu	10,084	0.75
Total votes		1,343,481	100.00

Louisiana general election
Party	Candidate	Votes	%	±%
Democratic	John Bel Edwards (incumbent)	774,498	51.33%	–4.78
Republican	Eddie Rispone	734,268	48.67	+4.78
Total votes		1,508,784	100.00%	
Democratic hold				

== Mississippi ==
2019 Mississippi gubernatorial election
- November 5, 2019
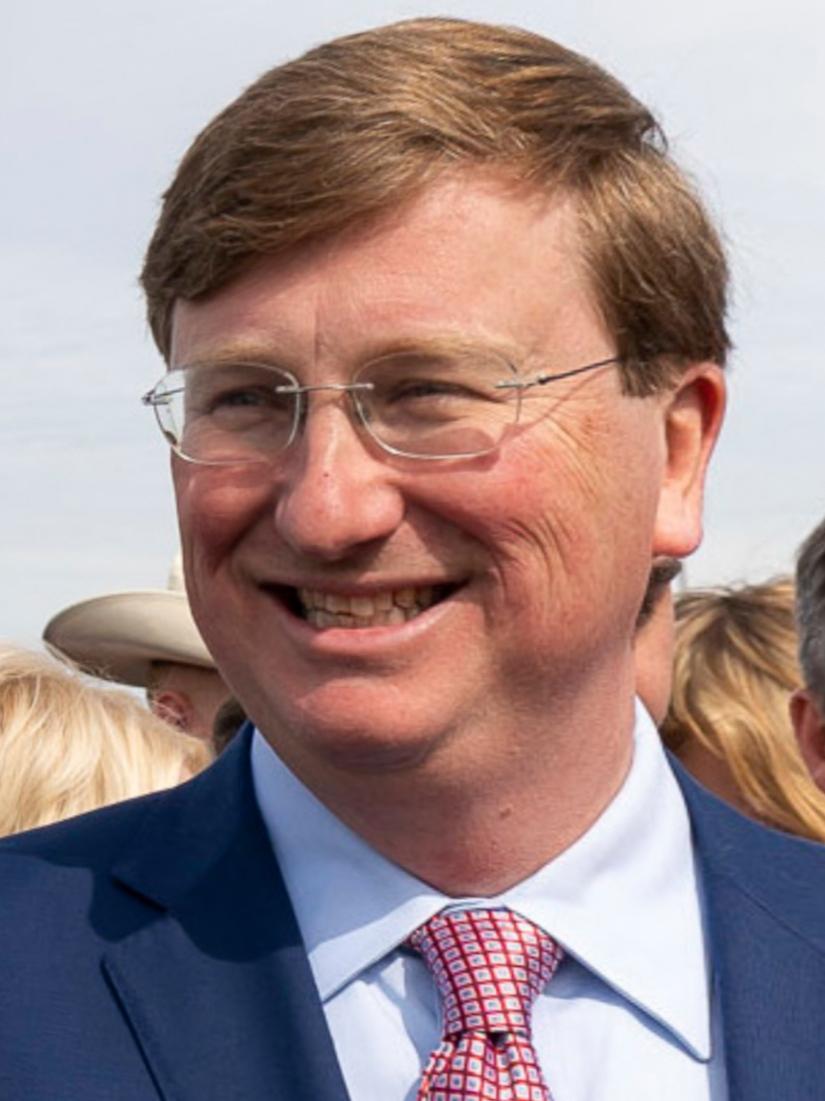

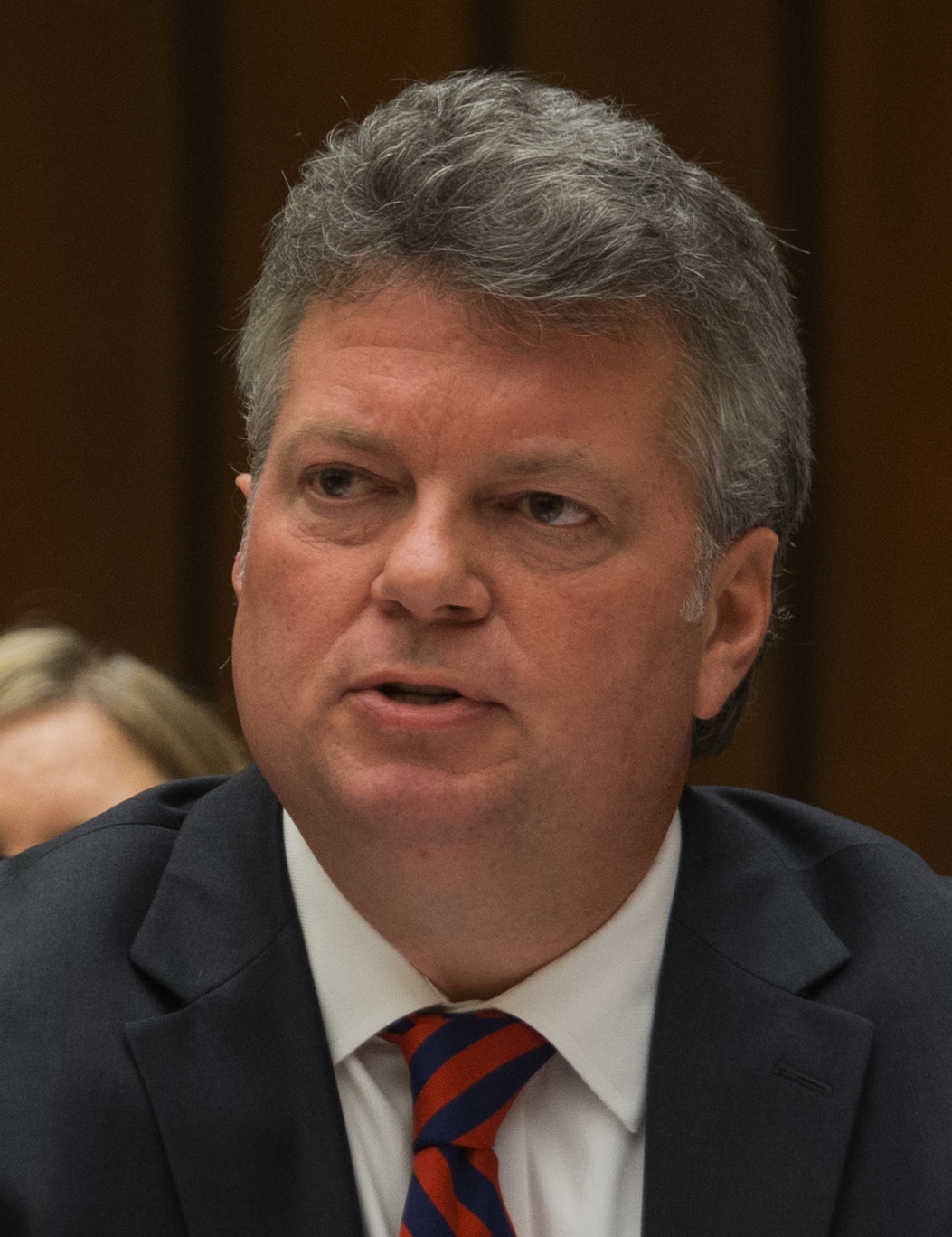
Nominee	Tate Reeves	Jim Hood
Party	Republican	Democratic
Popular vote	459,396	414,368
Percentage	51.91%	46.83%
- County results Reeves: 50–60% 60–70% 70–80% 80–90% Hood: 50–60% 60–70% 70–80% 80–90%
Governor before election
Phil Bryant
Republican
Elected Governor
Tate Reeves
Republican

Incumbent governor Phil Bryant was ineligible to run for a third term due to term limits. The Democratic Party nominated incumbent attorney general Jim Hood, the only Democrat holding statewide office in Mississippi; the Republican Party nominated incumbent lieutenant governor Tate Reeves after a runoff.

Situated in the Deep South, Mississippi is one of the most Republican states in the country. No Democrat has been elected to the governorship since Ronnie Musgrove in 1999. However, the state's Democratic Attorney General, Jim Hood, who had held his office since 2004 and had yet to lose a statewide election, put the Republican's winning streak of four elections in a row to the test, as the race became unusually competitive. Reeves defeated Hood in the general election by a margin of 5.1%, making this the closest a Democrat had come to winning a Mississippi gubernatorial election since 1999, where Musgrove won with 49.6% of the vote. Hood flipped the counties of Chickasaw, Lafayette, Madison, Panola, and Warren, which had all voted for Republican Donald Trump in the 2016 United States presidential election.

Mississippi Republican primary
Party	Candidate	Votes	%
Republican	Tate Reeves	187,312	48.90
Republican	Bill Waller Jr.	128,010	33.42
Republican	Robert Foster	67,758	17.68
Total votes		383,080	100.00

Mississippi Republican primary runoff
Party	Candidate	Votes	%
Republican	Tate Reeves	179,623	54.13
Republican	Bill Waller Jr.	152,201	45.87
Total votes		331,824	100.00

Mississippi Democratic primary
Party	Candidate	Votes	%
Democratic	Jim Hood	208,634	69.00
Democratic	Michael Brown	33,247	10.99
Democratic	Velesha Williams	20,844	6.89
Democratic	Robert Shuler Smith	20,395	6.74
Democratic	Robert Ray	5,609	1.85
Democratic	William Bond Compton Jr.	5,321	1.76
Democratic	Albert Wilson	5,122	1.69
Democratic	Gregory Wash	3,218	1.06
Total votes		302,390	100.00

Mississippi general election
Party	Candidate	Votes	%	±%
Republican	Tate Reeves	459,396	51.91%	–14.47
Democratic	Jim Hood	414,368	46.83%	+14.58
Independent	David Singletary	8,522	0.96%	N/A
Constitution	Bob Hickingbottom	2,625	0.30%	N/A
Total votes		884,911	100.00%	
Republican hold				

== See also ==
- 2019 United States elections
  - 2019 Kentucky elections
  - 2019 Louisiana elections
  - 2019 Mississippi elections
