= Isidro Michel López =

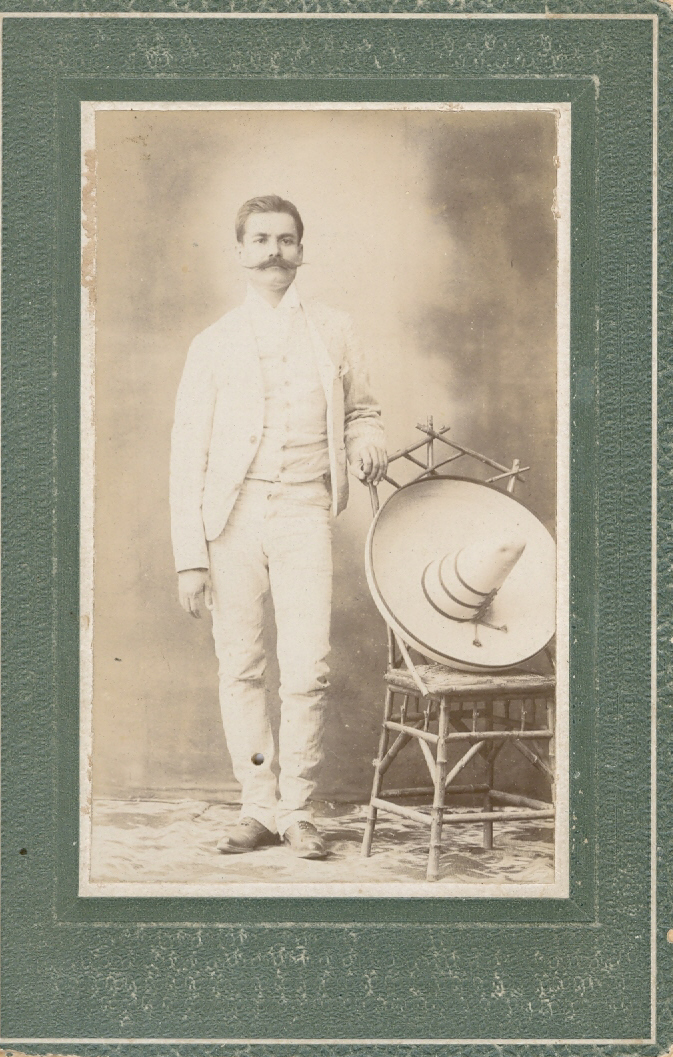
Capitán Isidro Michel López

Isidro Michel López (15 May 1870, in Autlán de Navarro – 6 April 1942, in Autlán de Navarro) was a Mexican military officer who participated in the Mexican Revolution.
