= Vivian Juan-Saunders =

Leader of the Tohono O'odham nation in Arizona

Chairwoman of the Tohono O'odham
- In office June 3, 2003 – August 3, 2007
- Vice President: Ned Norris Jr. (2003-2006)
- Preceded by: Edward D. Manuel
- Succeeded by: Ned Norris Jr.

Personal details
- Born: 1960 (age 65–66)
- Spouse: Richard Saunders
- Occupation: Politician

Vivian Juan-Saunders is an American politician who became the first woman to lead the Tohono O'odham Nation of southern Arizona in 2003. She served as Chairwoman of the Tohono O'odham from 2003 until 2007.

== Biography ==
Juan-Saunders is from New Fields community in Chukut Kuk District of the Tohono O'odham Nation and is a former Miss Tohono O'odham Nation and later Miss Indian Arizona and in 1982 won the crown of Miss Indian America in Sheridan, Wyoming. She is the former vice president of Tohono O'odham Community College, which is located in Sells, Arizona. Juan-Saunders has a Masters in American Indian Studies from the University of Arizona.

In 1999, Juan-Saunders, together with running mate Ned Norris, Jr., challenged incumbent Tohono O'odham Chairman Edward D. Manuel for the chairmanship in the executive election. Manuel defeated Juan-Saunders to win a second term in office.

Juan-Saunders once again challenged Manuel in 2003, in a rematch of the 1999 race. She was elected the Chairwoman of the Tohono O'odham nation in the May 24. 2003, tribal election, with Ned Norris, Jr. as her running mate. She defeated incumbent Tohono O'odham Chairman Edward D. Manuel, who had held the office since 1995, with 59% of the popular vote while carrying eight of the eleven electoral districts. In doing so, she became the first woman to lead the Tohono O'odham.

Juan-Saunders was officially inaugurated as Chairwoman of the Tohono O'odham nation on Monday, June 3, 2003, by Tohono O'odham chief judge Betsy Norris. A larger ceremonial inauguration was later held on June 27, 2003, at Baboquivari High School in Topawa, Arizona. Norris, her running mate, served as the vice chairman of the Tohono O'odham until his resignation in June 2006.

Vivian Juan-Saunders was defeated for re-election in May 2007 by her former running mate, Ned Norris, Jr., who received 1,766 of the 3,105 total votes cast in the election.

Juan-Saunders was defeated again in 2011 for the Chairmanship and also ran for the office in 2015. In May 2017, Juan-Saunders was elected to the Tohono O'odham Legislative Council for a four-year term representing Chukut Kuk District.

== See also ==
- List of Native American politicians
- Native American women in politics
