= Edward Manuel =

American politician

Chairman of the Tohono Oʼodham Nation
- Incumbent
- Assumed office 1995–2003, 2015–present
- Vice President: Verlon Jose
- Preceded by: Sylvester Listo Ned Norris, Jr.
- Succeeded by: Vivian Juan-Saunders

Personal details
- Spouse: Betty Manuel
- Occupation: Politician

Edward D. Manuel is an American politician and current Chairman of the Tohono Oʼodham Nation council. He previously served the post of the Tohono O'odham nation of southern Arizona from 1995 until 2003. He is from Pisinemo, Arizona.

Manuel was elected and took office as Chairman of the Tohono O'odham in 1995. He was re-elected for a second term in 1999, defeating challenger Vivian Juan-Saunders and her running mate, Ned Norris, Jr.

Manuel, who was seeking a third term as Chairman, was defeated for re-election in May 34, 2003, in a rematch with Vivian Juan-Saunders. Juan-Saunders won 59% of the vote and eight of the eleven electoral districts in the 2003 election.

In May 2015, after serving two years as a Legislative representative, along with running mate Verlon Jose, Manuel was elected to a third term as Chairman by 213 votes over incumbent Ned Norris, Jr.
