= James R. Floyd =

Former chief executive of the Muscogee (Creek) Nation

James Floyd
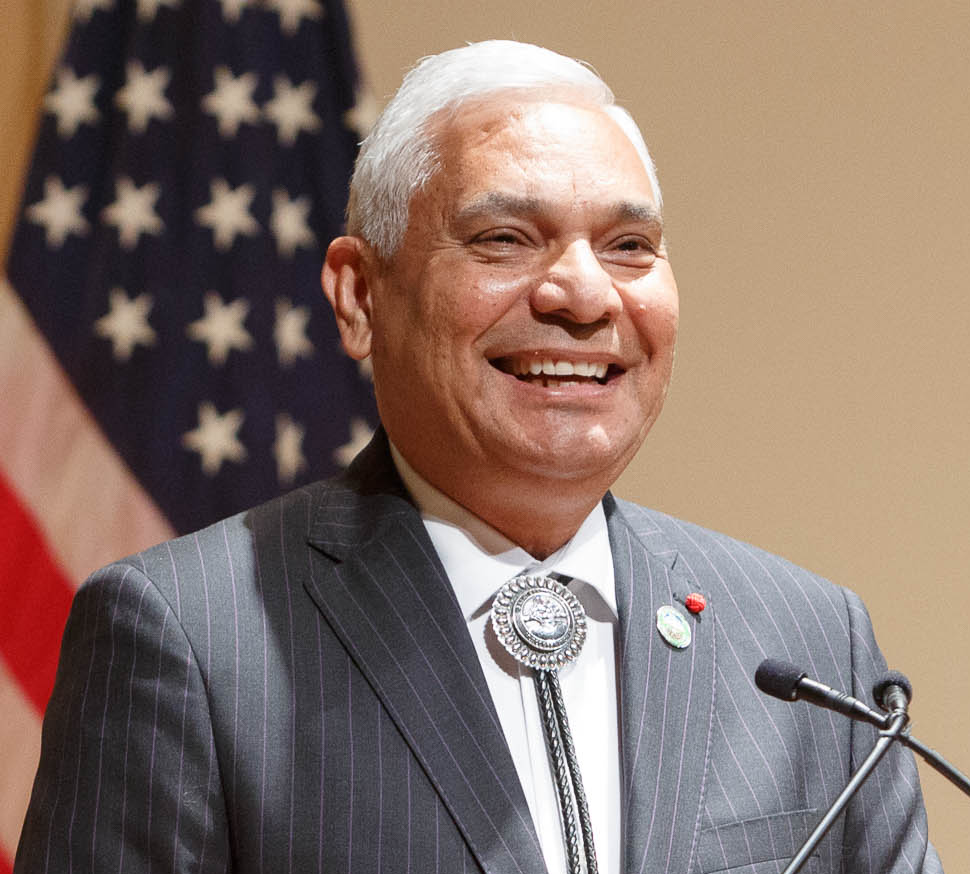
- Floyd in 2019

Principal Chief of the Muscogee Nation
- In office January 4, 2016 – January 1, 2020
- Preceded by: George Tiger
- Succeeded by: David Hill

Personal details
- Spouse: Carol Tustison
- Children: 2
- Education: Oklahoma State University, Oklahoma City; Northeastern State University (BS); Portland State University (MPA)

James R. Floyd was the chief executive of the Muscogee (Creek) Nation located in Okmulgee, Oklahoma. Floyd won 2,964 votes constituting 62% of the votes in the 2015 general elections, which took place on November 2, 2015, to beat incumbent Chief George Tiger. On January 2, 2016, Floyd was sworn in as Muscogee (Creek) Nation principal chief by MCN Supreme Court Chief Justice Andrew Adams III during an inauguration ceremony at the Mvskoke Dome in Okmulgee, Oklahoma. His term officially began on January 4, 2016.

As chief executive, he oversaw the Departments of Housing, Heal, Social Services, Education, Training, Economic Development, Law Enforcement, Language, Tourism, Cultural/Historic Preservation, Media/Public Affairs, Community Development, Environmental, Veterans Services, and Roads. He further coordinated with traditional church and ceremonial ground leaders (Mekkos), Tribal communities, Tribal Legislative and Judicial branches, as well as with other tribal, city, state and federal governments.

In June 2019, Floyd announced that he will not seek re-election as chief executive stating that he wants to spend more time with his family. He will remain in office until the end of his term in December 2019.

== Personal life ==
Floyd is Wind Clan of his mother's (Margaret) Koweta Tribal Town and a son of his father's (Joe) Bear Clan. He attends the Tvlahasse Wvkokaye ceremonial ground.

Floyd graduated from Eufaula High School in 1970, earned an associate degree from Oklahoma State University, Oklahoma City, graduated with honors with a Bachelor of Science in Health Care Administration from Northeastern State University, and earned a Masters of Public Administration/Health Administration from Portland State University. He completed training at the University of North Carolina and at the Brookings Institution. Floyd became a Fellow in the American College of Health Executives in 2009.

He has been married to Carol (Tustison) Floyd since 1979. They have a son, Jacob and a daughter, Erin.

== Career ==
Floyd began his professional career with Muscogee (Creek) Nation in Environmental Services. Floyd's health care career began in 1978 with the Muscogee (Creek) Nation of Oklahoma where he served as the Director of Community Services. In that capacity, he designed and established the first tribal-owned and operated health care system in the United States, which consisted of a 39-bed community hospital and four outpatient health clinics.

From 1992 to 1997, he served as Director of the Portland Area Indian Health Service and directed the management of federal health care facilities in the states of Washington, Oregon, and Idaho. He also assisted tribal governments in the development of community-based health care programs. During his tenure with Indian Health Service, he served a special assignment in the U.S. Senate Committee on Indian Affairs developing legislative authority for Native American health care programs.

In 1997, Floyd was appointed within the VA as Director of the VA Salt Lake City Health Care System. In 2004, he was recognized with the Under Secretary for Health's Diversity Award for his work in establishing innovative outreach and treatment programs to Native American Veterans and, in 2002, he received the VA Secretary's Medal for Meritorious Service for exceptional performance in coordinating federal agencies' medical and security support for the 2002 Winter Olympic and Paralympics' Games.

In 2008, he was appointed by the Secretary of Veterans Affairs to serve as a member of the Veterans Rural Health Advisory Committee. Also that year, the Association of Military Surgeons of the United States presented him the Ray E. Brown Award for his advocacy in federal health care leadership. He served in that capacity until 2013.

Floyd was the Director of VA Heartland Network (VISN 15) in Kansas City, Missouri from October 2008 to January 2012. As director, he administered health care services to Veterans from seven medical centers on nine campuses and more than 47 community based outpatient clinics in Kansas, Missouri, Illinois, Indiana and Kentucky.

On January 17, 2012, he was appointed as the director of the Jack C. Montgomery VA Medical Center. He served as Director of the Eastern Oklahoma VA in Muskogee until his retirement in June 2015.

== Cabinet ==
Position	Name
Second Chief	Chief Louis Hicks
Controller	Clay A. Darnell, C.P.A.
Veteran's Affairs	Ken Davis
Secretary of the Nation and Commerce	Terra Branson
Secretary of Community & Human Services	Neenah Tiger
Attorney General	Kevin Dellinger
Acting Secretary of Housing	Jamie Nichols
Acting Tribal Administrator	Greg Anderson
Secretary of Interior Affairs	Jesse Allen
Secretary of Education, Employment & Training	Greg Anderson
Acting Tax Commissioner	Jennifer Langley
Secretary of Health	Shawn Terry
Gaming Commissioners	Christopher Combs; Skye McNiel; Tracie Revis
Lighthorse Police Chief	Robert Hawkins Jr.

Political offices
Preceded by George Tiger	Principal Chief of the Muscogee Nation; 2016–2020	Succeeded by David Hill
