= 2019 United States Virgin Islands electoral system referendum =

Ballot Measure in the US Virgin Islands

March 30, 2019
- Shall this proposal become law?
- Outcome: Proposal rejected due to low voter turnout.

Results
Choice	Votes	%
Yes	3,577	74.63%
No	1,216	25.37%
Valid votes	4,793	99.42%
Invalid or blank votes	28	0.58%
Total votes	4,821	100.00%
Registered voters/turnout	51,734	9.32%

A referendum on amending the electoral system for the Legislature was held in the United States Virgin Islands on March 30, 2019. Although the proposal was approved by 75% of voters, voter turnout was below 10%, invaliding the result.

== Background ==
The referendum was a popular initiative put forward by the St. Croix Government Retirees organization. In order for the initiative to go to a referendum, the organization was required to collect the signatures of at least 10% of registered voters in the two electoral districts, St Croix and St Thomas/St John. They collected 2,343 signatures in St Croix (above the 2,298 required) and 2,553 in St Thomas/St John (where 2,530 were required), meaning that the proposal would be put to a public vote.

In order for the referendum result to be valid, a majority would need to vote in favor of the proposal and voter turnout be above 50%.

== Proposals ==
Prior to the referendum, the 15 members of the Legislature consisted of fourteen members elected from two seven-member districts (St Croix and St Thomas/St John) and one at-large member (who had to be a St John resident). The proposals would see both St Croix and St Thomas divided into two two-member districts, while St John would be a single-member district. Three at-large members would also be elected from both St Croix and St Thomas.

== Results ==
Choice	Votes	%
For	3,577	74.63
Against	1,216	25.37
Invalid/blank votes	28	–
Total	4,821	100
Registered voters/turnout	51,734	9.32
Source: VI Vote
