= David Hill (Muscogee politician) =

American-Muscogee politician

Principal Chief of the Muscogee Nation
- Incumbent
- Assumed office January 1, 2020
- Preceded by: James R. Floyd

Personal details
- Born: 1964 (age 61–62) Talihina, Oklahoma, U.S.
- Citizenship: American; Muscogee Nation

David Hill (born 1964 in Talihina, Oklahoma) is a Muscogee politician who has served as the 7th Principal Chief of the Muscogee Nation since 2019.

== Biography ==
David Hill spent 30 years working in the aerospace industry before entering Muscogee Nation politics. He served 12 years on the Muscogee Nation National Council before his election as principal chief. In December 2019, he defeated Bim Steven Bruner in the election to succeed James R. Floyd as the Principal Chief of the Muscogee Nation. He won reelection in 2023 with 58% of the vote. He was named one of Time magazine's 100-most influential people of 2020 after the McGirt v. Oklahoma decision by the United States Supreme Court.

Political offices
Preceded by James R. Floyd	Principal Chief of the Muscogee Nation; 2026–present	Incumbent
