= Desert View High School =

Public high school in Arizona, United States

Location
- 4101 East Valencia Road; Tucson, Arizona 85706; United States; 32°08′09″N 110°54′15″W

Information
- School type: Public
- Opened: 1985 (41 years ago)
- Sister school: Sunnyside High School
- School district: Sunnyside Unified School District
- CEEB code: 030479
- Principal: Angelica Duddleston
- Teaching staff: 100.85 (FTE)
- Grades: 9-12
- Enrollment: 2,157 (2023-2024)
- Student to teacher ratio: 21.39
- Colors: Silver and maroon
- Mascot: Jaguars
- Rival: Sunnyside High School
- Website: desertview.susd12.org

Desert View High School is a public high school located in southern Tucson, Arizona approximately 1 mile west of I-10 and Valencia Road.

== History ==
Desert View High School opened in 1985 with 9th, 10th, 11th and 12th grade classes. The new school was designed with the philosophy that it was an educational regime, focused on itself and set apart from its community. The building was thus designed with no windows, and a single entrance that would present an "impregnable face to the world".

Desert View is one of three high schools in the Sunnyside school district; the other two being Sunnyside High School and Star Academic High School. It is ranked #170 amongst Arizona high schools, and #1 in the Sunnyside Unified School District. About 80% of the school role are hispanic, However, lying close to the Valencia reserve border, the school has the largest population of Native Americans in any off-reservation school in Tucson, about 10% of the school role. In 2007 the school pioneered a Native American Literature class curriculum. This was developed because the school recognised that Native American students were harmed when none of the curriculum reflected their own culture, and that other students were studying American literature absent Native authors. Indigenous cultures and histories were also not being recognised in the metropolitan area.

== See also ==
- Sunnyside High School

== Bibliography ==
- "Desert View High School". Arizona Interscholastic Association.
- Kobilka, Sara; Simmons, Shalane; Higgins, Michelle (January 2019). "Imagine Your STEM Future". Connected Science Learning. 1 (9). doi:10.1080/24758779.2019.12420534.
- Hopkins, Pamela Lee (December 1992). "Simulating hamlet in the classroom". System Dynamics Review. 8 (1): 91–98. doi:10.1002/sdr.4260080109.
- McDonagh, Eileen; Pappano, Laura (2008). Playing With the Boys: Why Separate is Not Equal in Sports. Oxford University Press, USA. ISBN 978-0-19-516756-6.
- Monahan, Torin; Torres, Rodolfo D. (October 13, 2009). Schools Under Surveillance: Cultures of Control in Public Education. Rutgers University Press. ISBN 978-0-8135-4826-5.
- "Desert View High School". National Center for Education Statistics.
- Ortiz, Flora Ida; Gonzales, Rosa (November 1, 2000). "Latino High School Students' Pursuit of Higher Education". Aztlán: A Journal of Chicano Studies. 25 (1): 67–108. doi:10.1525/azt.2000.25.1.67.
- Paris, Django; Alim, H. Samy (2017). Culturally Sustaining Pedagogies: Teaching and Learning for Justice in a Changing World. Teachers College Press. ISBN 978-0-8077-7570-7.
- San Pedro, Timothy J. (November 1, 2015). "Silence as Shields: Agency and Resistances among Native American Students in the Urban Southwest". Research in the Teaching of English. 50 (2): 132–153. doi:10.58680/rte201527599. ISSN 0034-527X.
- Simmons, Lizbet (December 31, 2020). "3. The Docile Body in School Space". Schools Under Surveillance: 55–70. doi:10.36019/9780813548265-004. ISBN 978-0-8135-4826-5.
- "Hall of Fame Inductees". Sunnyside Unified School District. Archived from the original on August 17, 2010.
- "Desert View High School". USnews education. US News. n.d.
- Wells, Joseph T. (January 23, 2009). Computer Fraud Casebook: The Bytes that Bite. John Wiley & Sons. ISBN 978-0-470-48892-8.
- Wurr, Adrian J.; Hellebrandt, Josef (January 9, 2007). Learning the Language of Global Citizenship: Service-Learning in Applied Linguistics (PDF). Wiley. ISBN 978-1-933371-06-1.
