= Sunnyside Unified School District =

School district in Arizona, United States

Address
- 2238 East Ginter Road Tucson, Arizona, 85706; United States

District information
- Type: Public
- Grades: PreK–12
- President: Consuelo Hernandez
- NCES District ID: 0408170

Students and staff
- Students: 14,942
- Teachers: 767.4
- Staff: 808.97
- Student–teacher ratio: 19.47

Other information
- Website: www.susd12.org

Sunnyside Unified School District is a school district in Pima County, Arizona, United States. The district extends from Tucson south to Sahuarita and from Interstate 19 to Wilmot Road. It has one early learning center, one K-8 school, one intermediate school, 12 elementary schools, 4 middle schools and 3 high schools, with a certified teaching staff of 1,200 and a student body of 17,400.

== History ==
Sunnyside School District was established in 1921. Around 1927, Sunny Side School (now Sunnyside), a two-story brick building was constructed on the southwest corner of Valencia Road and Nogales Highway. The school held first through eighth grades in it and consisted of four classrooms and an auditorium. The school served the children of neighboring areas such as Emery Park, which was a poultry colony, just to the north of the educational facility.

In 1951, the Sunnyside School District chose to desegregate its elementary schools to allow African American children to attend.

== Schools ==
=== Early childhood ===
- Ocotillo Early Learning Center (Coyotes) (Tucson)

=== Elementary schools ===
- Craycroft Elementary School (Hawks) (Littletown)
- Drexel Elementary School (Panthers) (Tucson)
- Elvira Elementary School (Eagles) (Elstone, Tucson)
- Esperanza Elementary School (Eagles) (Desert Shadows, Tucson)
- Gallego Primary Fine Arts Magnet School (Gatos) (Tucson International Gateway Center, Tucson)
- Liberty Elementary School (Rams) (Sunnyside, Tucson)
- Los Amigos Elementary School (Leopards) (Tucson)
- Los Niños Elementary School (Roadrunners) (Drexel-Alvernon)
- Mission Manor Elementary School (Mustangs) (Sunnyside, Tucson)
- Rivera Elementary School (Raptors) (Cherry Avenue, Tucson)
- Santa Clara Elementary School (Bulldogs) (Elvira, Tucson)
- Summit View Elementary School (Mountain Lions) (Summit)

=== K-8 Schools ===
- Sierra K-8 School (Rams) (Tucson)

=== 4-8 Fine Arts ===
- Gallego Intermediate Fine Arts 4-8 (Wildcats) (Tucson)

=== Middle schools ===
- Apollo Middle School (Eagles) (Valley View, Tucson)
- Challenger Middle School (Chargers) (Barrio Nopal, Tucson)
- Gallego Intermediate 4-8 Fine Arts Magnet School (Wildcats) (Los Ranchitos, Tucson)
- Billy Lane Lauffer Middle School (Rattlers) (Littletown)

=== High schools ===
- S.T.A.R. Academic Center (Lions) (Arcadia, Tucson)
- Desert View High School (Jaguars) (Tucson)
- Sunnyside High School (Blue Devils) (Tucson)
