= Anthony Chavez =

American baseball player (born 1970)

- Relief pitcher
- Born: October 22, 1970 (age 55); Turlock, California, U.S.
- Batted: Right Threw: Right

MLB debut
- September 2, 1997, for the Anaheim Angels

Last MLB appearance
- September 27, 1997, for the Anaheim Angels

MLB statistics
- Win–loss record: 0–0
- Earned run average: 0.93
- Strikeouts: 10
- Stats at Baseball Reference

Teams
- Anaheim Angels (1997)

Anthony Francisco Chavez (born October 22, 1970) is an American former professional baseball player who played 13 professional baseball seasons. In 1992, he made the All-Big West Conference Second Team out of San Jose State University and a 50th round selection by the California Angels in the 1992 June Draft. He made his major league debut on September 2, 1997, against the Colorado Rockies where he recorded 28 days of major league service. After the Angels he continued his professional career playing one season for the Oakland A's Triple-A World Series champions Vancouver Canadians in 1999. He also played two season for the Arizona Diamondbacks Triple-A club, the Tucson Sidewinders, from 2001 to 2002. He then finished off the rest of his pro career playing in the independent Atlantic League for the Atlantic City Surf from 2002 to 2005.

== After big leagues ==
Chavez received his Bachelor of Science in Sports Coaching from the United States Sports Academy and teaching certification from Pima Community College. Chavez has served as a pitching coach at Cienega High School in Vail, Arizona and head baseball coach at Mountain View High School in Marana, Arizona, Rincon/University High and Desert View High School in Tucson, Arizona. He is currently teaching at Andrada Polytechnic High School in Tucson.
