= Rob Urbinati =

American playwright

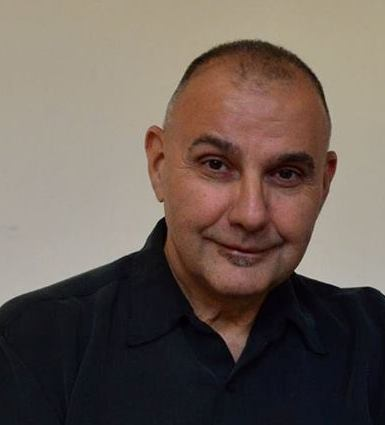
- Urbinati in 2014
- Born: August 12, 1952 (age 74); Framingham, Massachusetts
- Occupations: stage director, playwright, book author

Rob Urbinati (born August 12, 1952) is a freelance playwright, screenwriter, book author and theater director based in New York City. He is the Director of New Play Development at Queens Theatre.

== Background and education ==
Rob Urbinati was born in Framingham, Massachusetts and currently resides in New York City. He completed a BAat the University of Massachusetts, an MA at the University of Nebraska Omaha and a PhD (theatre arts) at the University of Oregon College of Arts and Sciences.

== Career overview ==
Plays written by Rob Urbinati include an adaptation of August Strindberg's 1888 play Miss Julie, Miss Julie in Hollywood (1993), produced in Seattle at Northwest Actors Studio in 1994, starring Heidi Schreck; Hazelwood Jr. High (1996), about the Murder of Shanda Sharer, which premiered at The New Group and starred Chloë Sevigny; Cruel and Barbarous Treatment (1999) based on the 1939 Mary McCarthy short story, at Gloucester Stage Company; Karaoke Night at the Suicide Shack (2002) and The Queen Bees (formerly named Shangri-La) (2006) at Queens Theatre; Rebel Voices (2006), an adaptation of Howard Zinn and Anthony Arnove's Voices of a People's History of the United States at Culture Project with a rotating cast including Staceyann Chin, Steve Earle, Danny Glover, Lenelle Moïse, Rich Robinson, Lili Taylor, and Wallace Shawn; Murder on West Moon Street (2006) which was based on Lord Arthur Savile's Crime, an Oscar Wilde short story and Cole Porter’s Nymph Errant (2001) produced by the Prospect Theatre Company; UMW: University of Mostly Whites (2012) commissioned and produced by Linfield College;

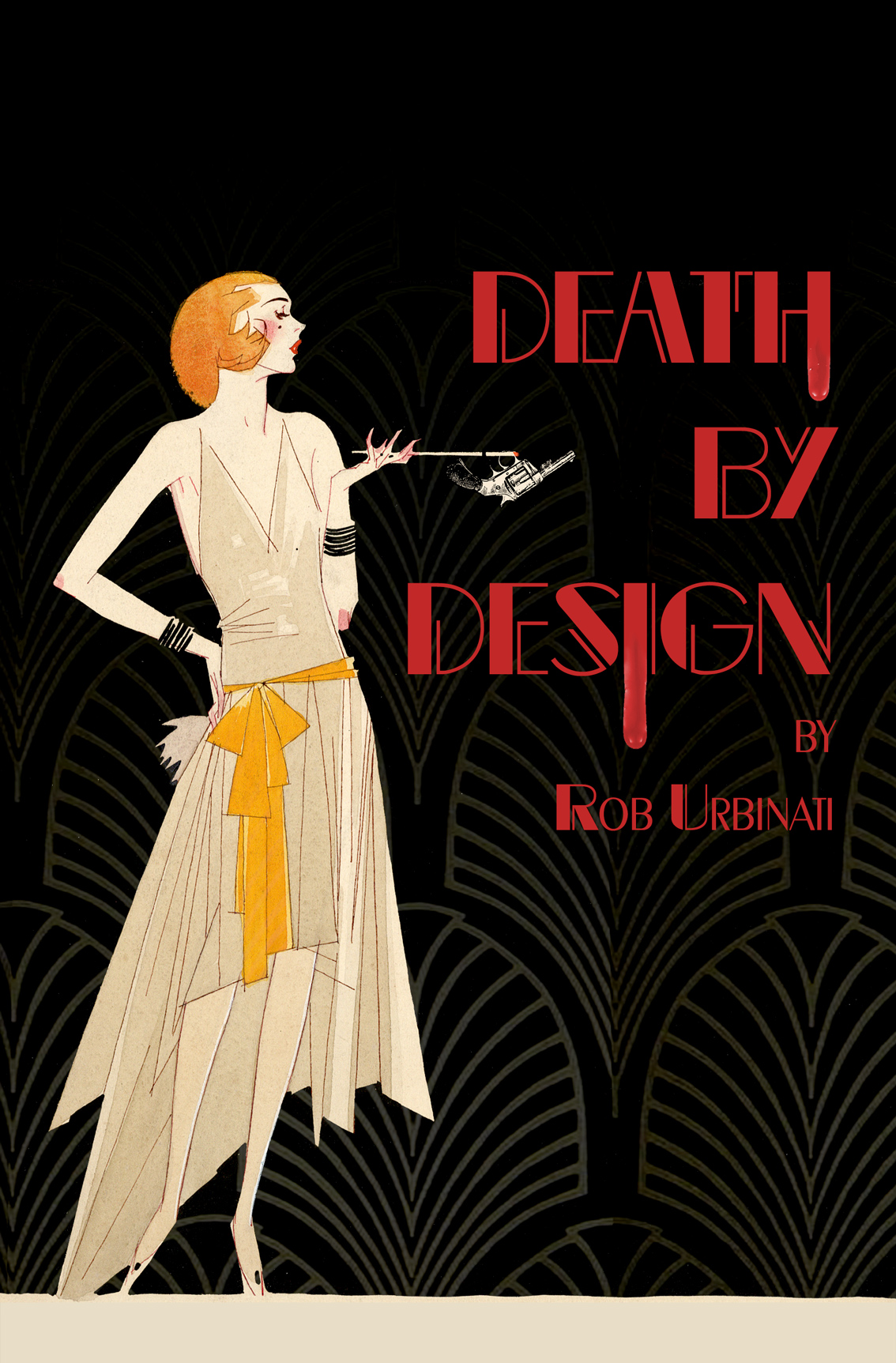
Poster designed by Ryan Fagan for the 2018 Live Theatre Workshop production of Rob Urbinati's Death by Design

Death By Design (2010) written in a mash-up of styles of Noël Coward and Agatha Christie, commissioned and produced by Houston Family Arts Center; Mama's Boy (2013), based on the lives of Marguerite Oswald and Lee Harvey Oswald, which premiered at Good Theater in Maine (2015). Our Boy (2017) which premiered at the Minnesota Fringe Festival. Zombie Holiday! which premiered at Stageworks in Texas in 2022, and Zombie Summer Holiday! which premiered at Seattle Central College in 2023.

Jane Austen's Lady Susan premiered at the Good Theatre in Portland, Maine in 2021. Hazelwood Jr. High, Murder on West Moon Street, Mama's Boy and Death By Design (as well as an alternate version with songs by Peter Mills) and Jane Austen's Lady Susan are published by Samuel French. Cole Porter’s Nymph Errantis published by Broadway Licensing. His plays have received over three hundred productions worldwide.

Urbinati's adaptation of William March and Maxwell Anderson’s The Bad Seed was presented in 2019 as a benefit reading for The New Group, directed by Cynthia Nixon, featuring John Cameron Mitchell, Ebony Marshall-Oliver, Joel Perez, Taylor Schilling, T. Ryder Smith, Wallace Shawn and Fred Weller.

His book, Play Readings: A Complete Guide for Theatre Practitioners (2015) is published by Focal Press/Routledge, who also published his article, Virtual Play Readings: A Model for Theatre Practitioners.

In New York, Urbinati directed the world premieres Staceyann Chin’s Border/Clash for the Culture Project; Eric Bogosian’s Griller for the Lincoln Center Director's Lab; James Armstrong's Foggy Bottom, Jan Buttram's The President and Her Mistress and Al Letson’s Summer in Sanctuary at the Abingdon; Kirk Bromley's Syndrome at the Greenwich Street Theatre, Bromley and Jessica Grace Wing's Lost at the Connelly Theatre; and Anne DeSalvo's Mamma Roma at Cherry Lane Theatre.

Also in New York, Urbinati directed Villa Diodati for the New York Musical Theatre Festival, (and at York Theatre Company), Angel Street at Pearl Theatre Company; 365 Days/365 Plays at The Public Theater; Springtime at HERE Arts Center, The Man with the Flower in His Mouth at Classic Stage Company, and Minstrel Show, or the Lynching of William Brown at Connelly Theatre, and then in Nebraska, Pennsylvania, New Jersey and Colorado.

Urbinati has directed at universities and colleges across the country including Concordia College in Minnesota, Bloomsburg University of Pennsylvania, Doane College in Nebraska, LaGuardia Community College in New York City, Clark University in Massachusetts, University of Oregon, University of Nebraska Omaha and New York University, where he directed Jeff Whitty’s Suicide Weather.

In Nebraska, he directed for Lied Center for Performing Arts, The Rose Theatre, Nebraska Shakespeare Festival, Nebraska Repertory Theatre, and Blue Barn Theatre, where his adaptation of Toxic Avenger: the Musical premiered.

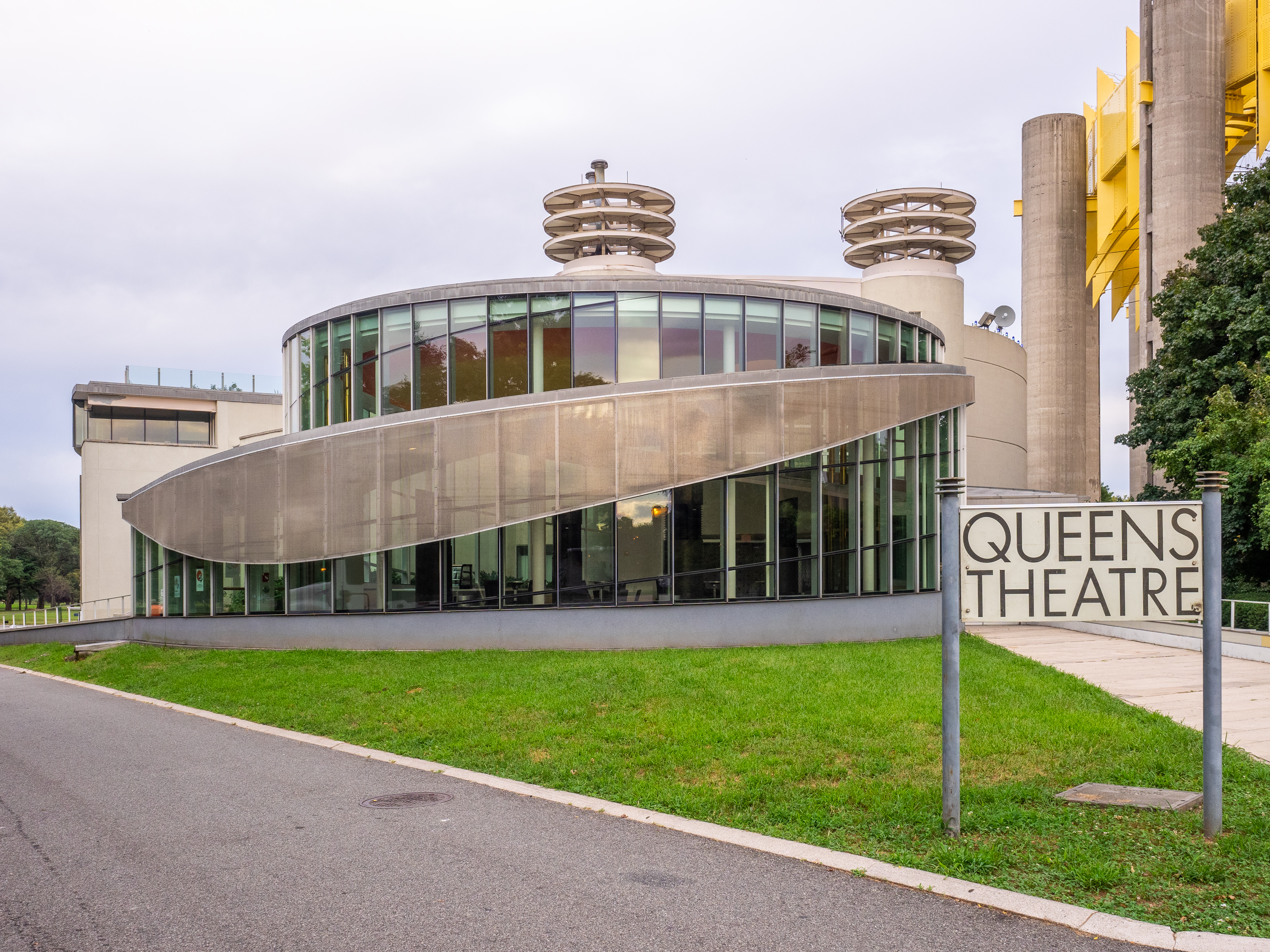
Queens Theatre

Urbinati is Director of New Play Development at Queens Theatre, where he curates New American Voices (formerly Immigrant Voices Project), a new play program which develops plays by writers who represent the diverse demographic of New York City. IVP/NAV has presented readings, workshops, full productions and co-productions of new work by over eighty writers including, Mashuq Mushtaq Deen, Kristoffer Diaz, Rajiv Joseph, Qui Nguyen, Heather Raffo, Saviana Stănescu, Caridad Svich, Cori Thomas and Lauren Yee. At Queens Theatre, Urbinati has directed many plays including Marry Me A Little, Angel Street, Master Class, and To Kill A Mockingbird.

Since receiving a Directing Fellowship from The Drama League, he has served on their Nominating Committee and various Selection Committees. For The Drama League, he directed William Inge's The Boy in the Basement, the world premieres of Tom Grady's Global Village and Max Sparber's The Older Gentleman and Cruelties. He wrote the Drama League Benefits honoring James Earl Jones, Bernadette Peters, and David Hyde Pierce and beginning Fall 2020, became an Inaugural Member of the Drama League's Directors Council.

In March 2009, on the International Day of Remembrance of the Victims of Slavery and the Transatlantic Slave Trade to mark the 200th anniversary of the abolition of the transatlantic slave trade, the United Nations, in association with the Culture Project, presented Breaking the Silence, Beating the Drum to which Urbinati contributed material. It was performed in the United Nations General Assembly Hall and directed by Kenny Leon, with Nile Rodgers as musical director, featuring Akon, The Blind Boys of Alabama, Izaline Calister, CCH Pounder, Toumani Diabate, Gilberto Gil, Salif Keita, Danny Glover, Whoopi Goldberg, Bill T. Jones, Ky-Mani Marley, Phylicia Rashad, and Stew.

Urbinati trained, and received a certificate in Audio Description from the Audio Description Project for the American Council of the Blind, and has provided Audio Description for the Broadway productions of Death of a salesman, Ohio State Murders, Bob Fosse's Dancin', Peter Pan Goes Wrong, Gutenberg! The Musical!, Harmony, and for various theatre and dance productions at Queens Theatre, Dance/NYC and Lincoln Center for the Performing Arts.

Urbinati has been a guest on many podcasts including Matt Baume's Sewers of Paris, and Kyle Marshall's Putting It Together. He was recently a panelist on "The 'Heart' of Audio Description" as part of The Society of Voice Arts and Sciences' "That's Voiceover Career Expo 2021."

Recently, Urbinati directed Al Letson’s The Centre Cannot Hold at the Hot Docs Festival in Toronto and the Five and Dime Theatre in Jacksonville, Florida.

Urbinati's play, As A Mighty River, which he co-wrote with Melissa Maxwell, was selected for a workshop by the 2019 Black and Latino Playwrights Celebration at Texas State University, curated by Eugene Lee.

Three productions he directed, Lost, Syndrome, and Border/Clash, and one that he wrote, Hazelwood Jr. High, were videotaped for the Billy Rose Theatre on Film and Tape Archive at the New York Public Library for the Performing Arts.

== Affiliations ==
Rob Urbinati is a member of the Dramatists Guild of America, and the Society of Stage Directors and Choreographers.

He is a participating member of the Drama Desk Awards as well as a critic covering New York City area theater for EDGE Media Network.

Urbinati has conducted numerous playwriting and directing workshops at various Regions of the Kennedy Center American College Theater Festival and has previously served as Theatre Consultant for Home Box Office, Literary Manager for The Private Theatre and Artistic Adviser for Houston Family Arts Center.

He served on the Advisory Panel for the 2020 Queens Council on the Arts, Artist Commissioning Program.

== Awards ==
In 2007 the Prospect Theater Company production of Urbinati's Murder on West Moon Street was nominated for 8 New York Innovative Theatre Awards for Outstanding Full Length Play, Outstanding Production of a Play, Outstanding Director, Outstanding Actress in a Lead Role, 2 for Outstanding Actor in a Lead Role, Outstanding Actress in a Featured Role and Outstanding Costume Design. In the same year, the Queens Theatre production of his musical Shangri La was also nominated for 4 New York Innovative Theatre Awards for Outstanding Production of a Musical, Outstanding Choreography/Movement, Outstanding Sound Design and Outstanding Actress in a Leading Role.

The Culture Project's 2005 production of Staceyann Chin's Border/Clash directed by Urbinati was nominated for the 2006 GLAAD Media Award, Outstanding New York Theater: Broadway and Off-Broadway.
