= Tucson High Magnet School =

Public school in Arizona

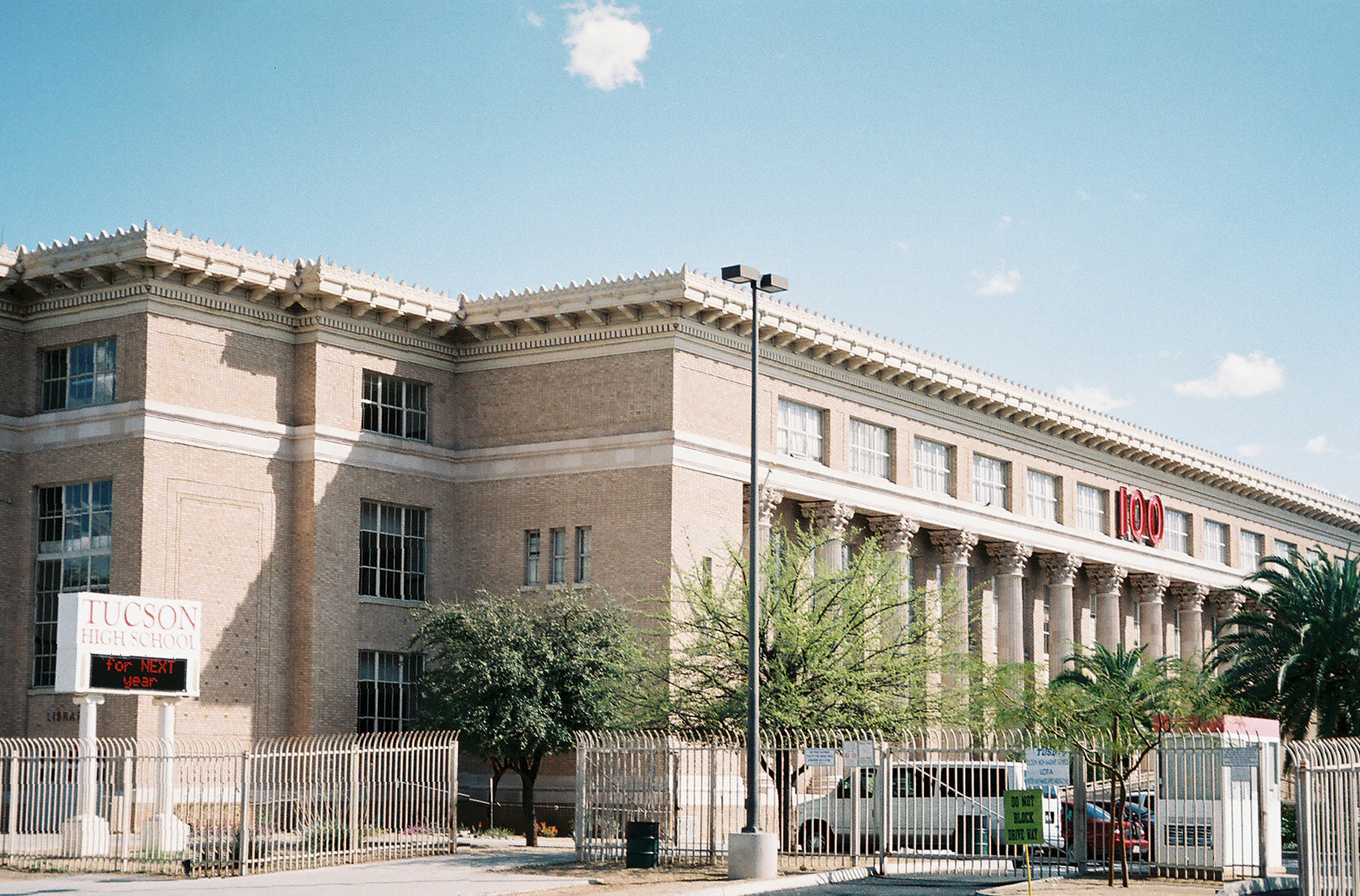

Location
- 400 North Second Avenue; Tucson, Arizona 85705; United States; 32°13′40″N 110°57′44″W

Information
- Type: Public (magnet) secondary
- Motto: Embracing Excellence; Home of Champions
- Established: 1892
- School board: Tucson Unified School District
- CEEB code: 030530
- Principal: Norma Gonzales
- Staff: 171.55 (FTE)
- Faculty: 225
- Grades: 9–12
- Enrollment: 3,039 (2023-2024)
- Student to teacher ratio: 17.71
- Campus size: 32 acres
- Campus type: Urban
- Colors: Red and white
- Mascot: Badger
- Rival: Cholla High School
- Newspaper: The Cactus Chronicle
- Yearbook: The Tucsonian
- Website: thms.tusd1.org

Tucson High Magnet School, commonly referred to as THMS, THS, or Tucson High, is a public high school in Tucson, Arizona. It is part of the Tucson Unified School District with magnet programs in Technology, Visual Arts, and Performing Arts. The school is located adjacent to the University of Arizona and is close to the Downtown Arts District. It is the oldest high school in Arizona, having been established in 1892 and then re-established in 1906. The school celebrated its centennial in 2006. In terms of enrollment, THMS is the largest high school in southern Arizona and the eleventh-largest in Arizona, with more than 3,200 students enrolled.

== History ==
Tucson High is the oldest operating public high school in Arizona. On April 10, 1906, the Arizona Board of Regents resolved that as of September 1, 1906, students from all Arizona cities, having a population of more than 5,000, must have completed the 9th grade before enrolling in the University of Arizona Preparatory Department. Then the voters of Tucson School District No. 1 approved the formation of a high school district on August 8, 1906.

The first day of class in the newly established Tucson High School was on September 10, 1906, with 45 students who began classes in the Plaza School at 13th Street and 4th Avenue. After a few weeks, the high school students were relocated to a two-room building located at 1010 E. 10th Street, the current location of Tucson Unified School District headquarters.

In 1908, they moved to the newly constructed Tucson High School building at 501 E. 6th Street, which is currently Roskruge Elementary and Bilingual Magnet Middle School, and remained at that location until they completed their high school years. By 1910, only ten students from that original class remained as students.

Construction on the current Tucson High School Main Building began in 1923 and was completed in 1924, in time for the fall classes. Tucson High's Main Building was designed by Henry Jaastad and cost $750,000. The grand building with its ornate details, such as Corinthian columns, stood as an architectural masterpiece then and remains the same today. A magnificent icon, the 14 towering columns of the Main Building welcomed classes ranging in size from 175 in 1924 to the largest class of 3,500+ in 2016. In the 1956, a second high school, Pueblo High School (3500 S. 12th Ave.) opened its doors in the southern part of Tucson and, in 1957, Catalina High School (3645 E. Pima) opened in the northeast part of the town to accommodate the increasing number of students in the fast-growing city of Tucson. Although Amphitheater High School had been operating at this time, it was a separate school district that served just a few students living in what was then far northwest area of Tucson. Amphi opened in 1939 as the second high school in Tucson.

The 1987 film, Can't Buy Me Love, starring Patrick Dempsey and Amanda Peterson, was shot on location at the school when it was known as Tucson High School.

== Achievements ==
First-place photography awards in AGFA national competition and other national recognition programs; five gold keys in Scholastic Art competitions; winners in the District graphic design competitions; band, choral, and drama groups have rated “superior” in local and state competitions, orchestras receiving "superior" ratings and "superior with distinction" (the highest possible rating) in the Fall of the 2015–2016 school year, and several music groups attending competitions in California every year, some receiving Silver (second highest award group) rankings and gold (highest award group) rankings to be given the chance to compete to perform in Carnegie Hall in New York; Academic Decathlon honors and high placement in the Southern Arizona Mock Trial competition; District recognition for “Outstanding Young Scientist;” students in the Math, Engineering, Science Achievement (MESA) program have placed high in state competition; several Regional Science Fair student awards; two National Merit Scholar Finalists.

The School's Yearbook Publication, The Tucsonian, is a nationally recognized and awarded publication that often receives First Class ratings from the National Scholastic Press Association, and a nomination for a Pacemaker Award, the highest national honor in the field of student journalism, for the 2010 volume of the book.

In 2013, Tucson High's theater teacher, Art Almquist, was named one of People Magazine's Teachers of the Year.

== Programs ==
Noteworthy programs at THMS include performing and visual arts; technological education providing comprehensive curriculum to all students with the most current technology available in these areas; an integrated program in humanities, arts, math, science, computers, bilingual and block English/social studies classes; the unique location enables students to take advantage of programs at the University of Arizona, Pima Community College, and the Downtown Arts District; marching band and jazz ensembles; vocal music; orchestra; mariachi; guitar; musical theater; folklorico; piano lab; film acting; studio photography; commercial arts; steel drums; environmental biology; integrated technology; robotics; and desktop publishing; and Advanced Placement classes are available in ten academic areas. One of the schools most significant and controversial programs focuses on Mexican American Studies (MAS). This program's curriculum is specifically designed to give Chicano/Latino students a more inclusive and culturally aware approach to education.

=== Marching Band ===
Tucson High Marching 100
- Director: Morani Sanders, Evan Norwood
- Members: 56
- Motto: "The Passion and Pulse of Tucson High"
- Website: tucsonhighband.org

The Tucson High Marching 100 is the oldest marching band in Tucson, Arizona. Started in 1919 as instrumental music by Arthur Sewell the program has grown immensely in its 100+ year time.

The Tucson High Marching 100 performs a field show annually at home football games and at competitions such as: University of Arizona Band Day, Ironwood Ridge March the Ridge, Walden Grove March in the Grove, Flowing Wells Show of Shows, Mountain View Rock the Den, TUSD Marching Band Exhibition, and Arizona State Marching Band Championships.

The band programs are directed by Tucson native, Morani Sanders, who, during his time at the accredited University High School, directed the best jazz ensembles in the United States. This leadership has influenced many other schools as Tucson High is a main source of training for many music educators in the Tucson area.

Marching Band Field Shows
| Year | Show Title | Musical Selections | Director(s) | Members |
|---|---|---|---|---|
| 1999 | Music of Queen | Bohemian Rhapsody, Under Pressure, We Are the Champions | Chad Allen | |
| 2001 | Music of the Red Hot Chili Peppers | | Kevin Christensen | |
| 2002 | West Side Story | | Kevin Christensen | |
| 2003 | Pure Imagination: The World of Roald Dahl | Willy Wonka, Matilda, James & The Giant Peach | Kevin Christensen, William Leyva | |
| 2004 | Pirates | Pirates of the Caribbean & Hook | Kevin Christensen, Lucy Huestis | |
| 2005 | Paridise Lost, Paridise Found | Time to Waste, Mockingbird, Gangsta's Paradise | Robert Sanchez, Lucy Huestis | 80 |
| 2006 | The American Dream | American Fire, American Heart, American Soul | Robert Sanchez, Lucy Huestis | 93 |
| 2007 | Far Beyond the Stars | | Robert Sanchez, JD Dentin, Lucy Huestis | |
| 2008 | Wicked | No One Mourns the Wicked, Dancing Through Life/Defying Gravity, For Good/No Good Deed/No One Mourns the Wicked | Christopher Constantine | 83 |
| 2009 | Takin' it to the Streets: The Music of Michael McDonald | Takin it to The Streets, What a Fool Belief, Minute by Minute, This is it | Christopher Constantine | |
| 2010 | Think Fast: The Music of Steely Dan | Reelin' in the Years, Rikki don't lose that number, Josie, Peg | Christopher Constantine | 68 |
| 2011 | The Multiples of One | Call of the Mountain, Adelina Damya, River of Tears | Christopher Constantine | |
| 2012 | A Night in the Tucson Mountains | Night Watch - Movement I, Night Watch - Movement II, Night on Bald Mountain | Christopher Constantine | |
| 2013 | THMS M100 World Tours | Riverdance, El Cumbachero, April in Paris(dise), Pictures At An Exhibition/Great Gate Of Kia | Christopher Constantine | 97 |
| 2014 | Alive and Amplified | The Pretender, All Along the Watchtower, Creep, Thriller | Christopher Constantine | 104 |
| 2015 | Star Trek through the years | Theme from Star Trek Generations | Lucy Huestis | 105 |
| 2016 | Keeping it Classic | | Lucy Huestis, Dean Moore | 91 |
| 2017 | Expressions in Red | Excitement, Passion, and Joy | Lucy Huestis, Dean Moore | 122 |
| 2018 | West Side Story | Maria, Cool, One Hand One Heart, America, Somewhere, Tonight | Dean Moore | 105 |
| 2019 | One Small Step | Sea, Air, Space | Dean Moore, Morani Sanders | 107 |
| 2021 | Elemental | Dark Skies, Cyclonic Destruction, Falling Snow, Rains and Parting Clouds | Dean Moore, Morani Sanders | 60 |
| 2022 | The Happiness Project | Can't Stop the Feeling, Adelie Land, Sing, Always Look on the Bright Side of Life | Dean Moore, Morani Sanders | 60 |
| 2023 | Decades of Adventure | Jurassic Park, Crossing Paths (The Wind Rises), Pirates of the Caribbean | Dean Moore, Morani Sanders | 69 |
| 2024 | Babylonia | The Tower, Hanging Gardens, Destruction | Morani Sanders, Evan Norwood | 64 |
| 2025 | Corazon Partido | Pasion Danza, Corazon Espanoles, Calles Noche | Morani Sanders, Evan Norwood, Jules O'Heron | 55 |
| 2026 | A Brave New World | Mad World, Dream World, Uncharted World, Wonderful World | Morani Sanders, Evan Norwood, Jules O'Heron | 64 |

Every Year the Tucson High Marching 100 participates in many local parades such as the Downtown Parade of Lights, The Pima Pet Parade, and Tucson Rodeo Parade. In 2025, the band made history by celebrating the 100th anniversary of marching in the Rodeo Parade

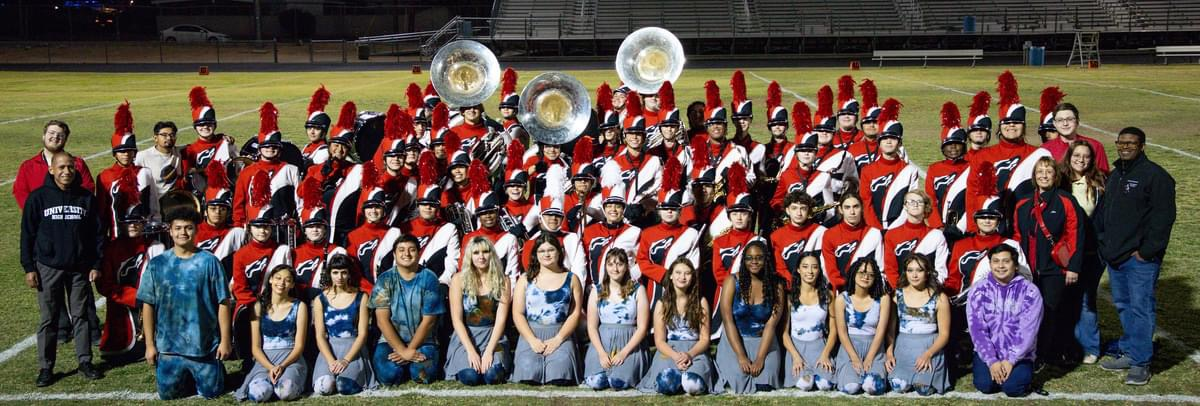
The Tucson High Marching 100 at the 2024 TUSD Marching Band Exhibition

=== Jovert (Steel Drums) ===
The Jovert Steel Drums Band started as Arizona's first high school steel drum ensemble in 1991 under band director Laszlo Veres. In 1999 the program was handed off to jazz pianist, Khris Dodge who was the first to call the program Jovert in 2000. As of 2010 the program services 110 students at Tucson High and has published four CDs in the past two decades. The program was handed off to a former student, Reuben Woodruff in 2021 before being taken over by band director Morani Sanders that same year. In 2024 the steel drum band changed direction again with Carlos Solis leading the program.

Jovert plays pop songs in the steel drum style around various venues in the Tucson region. The performances by the jovert put audiences in energetic mood.

== Badger Foundation ==
The Tucson High Badger Foundation was founded in early 1982 to enable alumni, parents, community members, and business leaders to support the continued excellence of the education provided to students at Tucson High (now known as Tucson High Magnet School). The foundation began as a group raising funds for a Jazz Band trip. By 1984, it became a 501(c)(3) organization. As of 2008, the group aims to provide financial assistance to Tucson High students, student groups, faculty and staff, which allows participation in special activities when funding is insufficient.

The Badger Foundation Board of Directors is made up of members who are alumni, teachers, and administrators. Jerry Strutz is the current chairman.

== Magnet program ==
Obtaining magnet status in 1982, Tucson High boasts four areas of specialized study: Visual and Performing Arts, Science, Mathematics and Technology. The magnet program involves 1,182 students.

Magnet programs in the Tucson Unified School District were established in compliance with a desegregation lawsuit. In order to escape the de facto racial segregation caused by neighborhoods feeding certain schools being predominantly of one minority, special funds were allotted to certain schools to develop special programs in areas such as the aforementioned, as well as ROTC, aviation and others. Students interested in studying these fields can opt to be bused to schools that are not their home schools, thus bringing a heterogeneous array of students to predominantly homogeneous schools. However, this has historically had questionable success.

== School facilities ==
=== Main Building ===
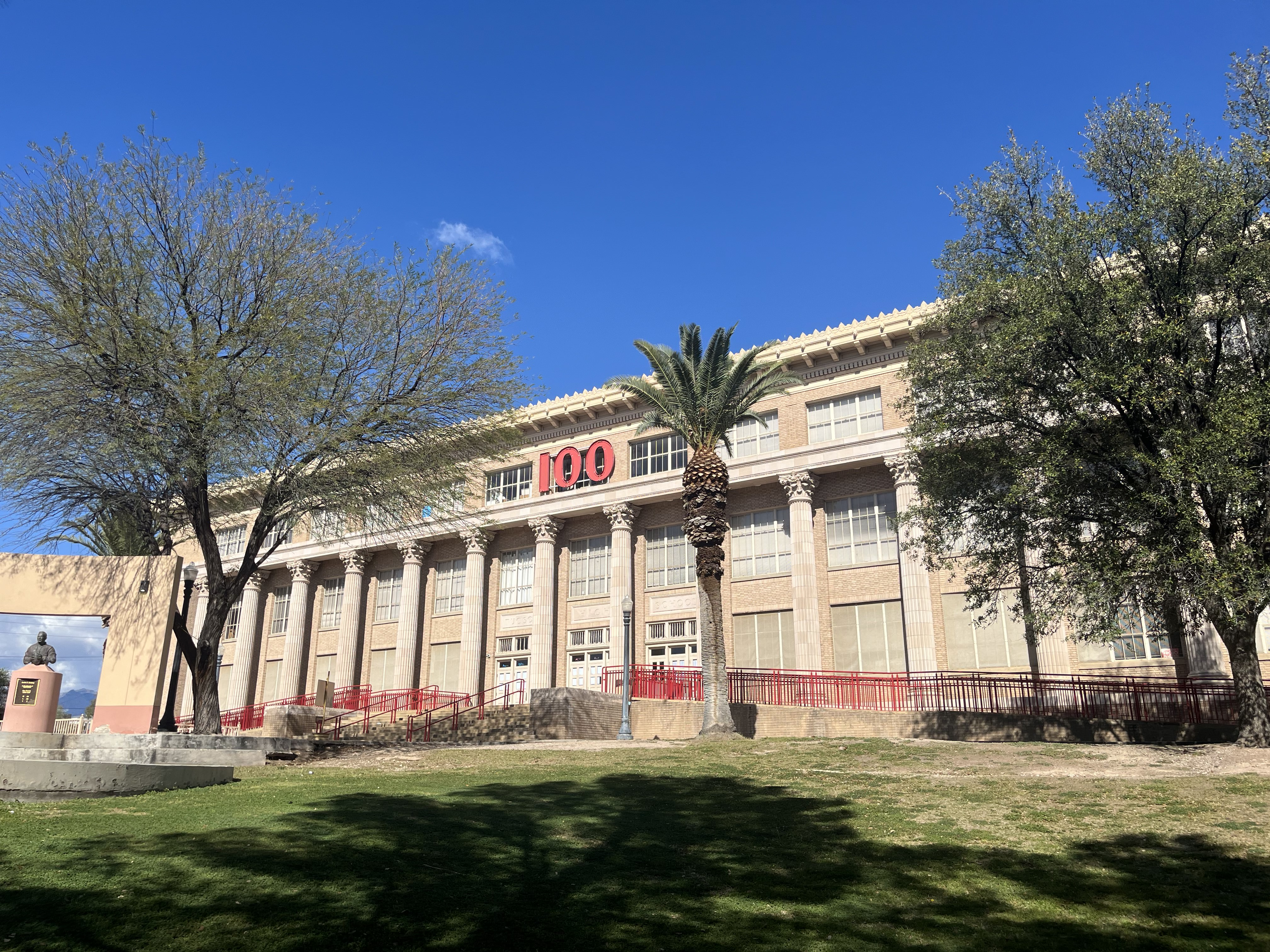
Tucson High's Main Building

Tucson High's Main Building was constructed in 1924 and was designed by famous architect Henry O. Jaastad. It cost $750,000. It has been placed on the National Register of Historic Places in Washington, D.C. Second Avenue once ran North and South in front of the Main Building on the West side, and 7th Street once ran East and West along the South side of the Main Building before the campus expanded and eliminated these through streets, an area now known as “The Mall”. Located in the Main Building: Attendance Office, Registrar, Counseling Offices, college and Career Center, Activities and Athletics Offices, Administrative Offices, Auditorium, Library, Gallery, and what is known as the "Little Theatre", one of two theaters at Tucson High.

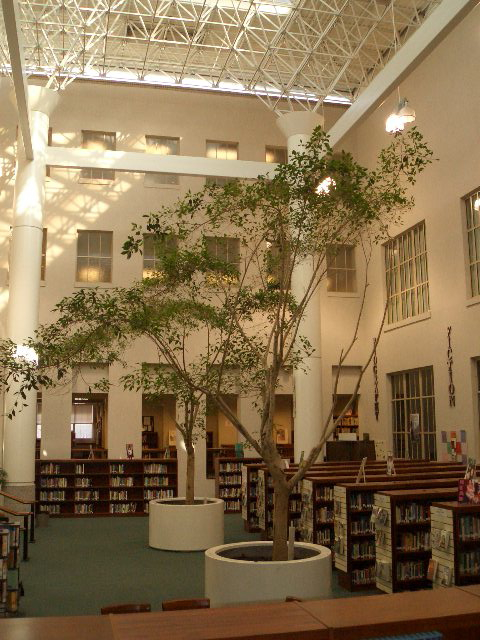
Interior of the library, this area, which was once a courtyard, now serves as an atrium.

==== East Wing ====
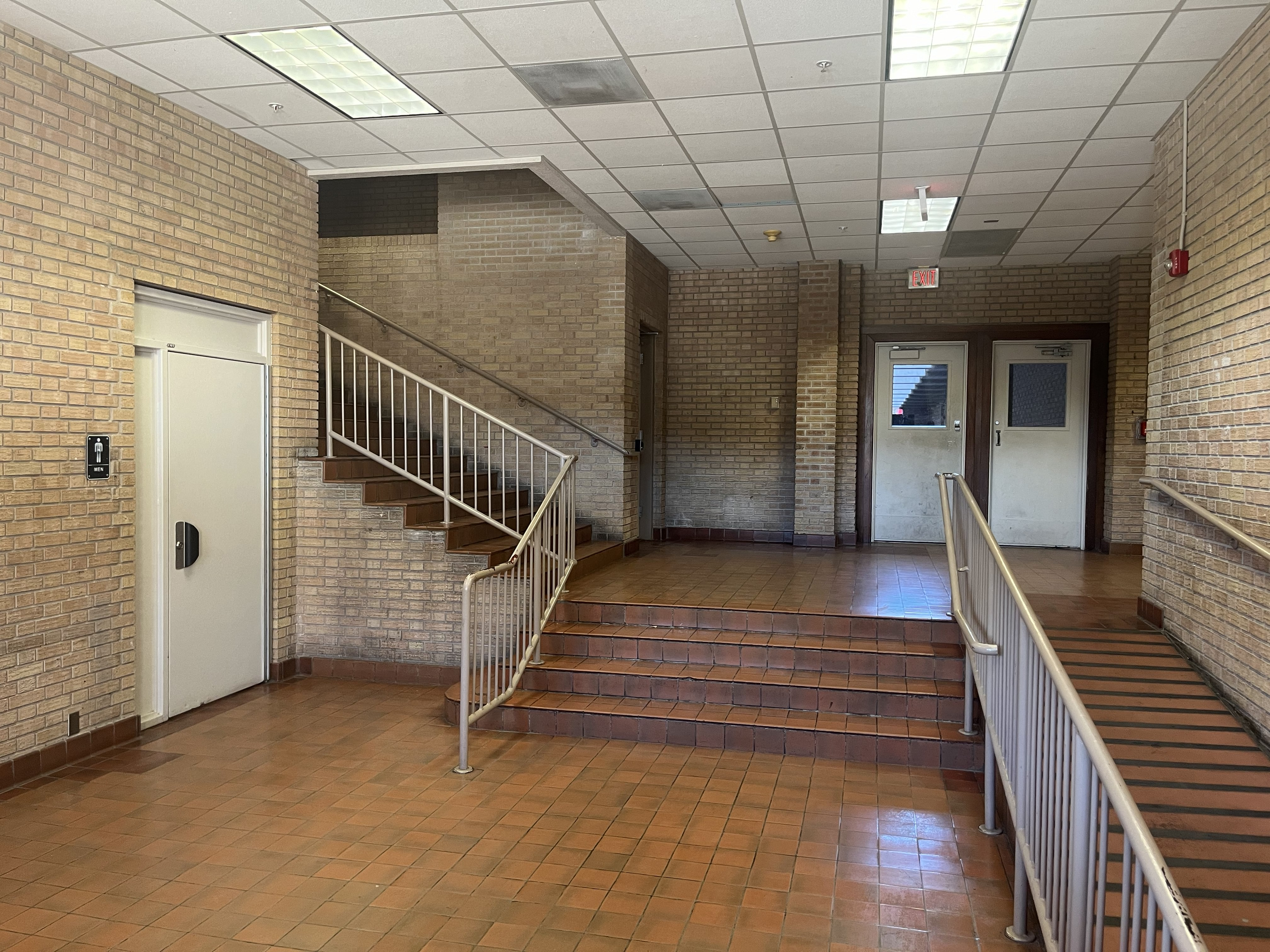
Tucson High's East Wing Lobby

1965: music rooms become the east part (E-Wing) of the Main Building. The East wing is composed of music rooms, such as an orchestra room, a choir room, a band room, and other rooms used for music theory and smaller music programs. The E-Wing also has a tunnel that connects it directly to the back of the auditorium, allowing music students to quickly get on stage for performances.

=== Vocational Building ===
1950s: Vocational Building (V-Building) is built in a modern architectural style, containing 48 classrooms and 13 shops. This building also contains the security office. The back wing is used to hold technical classes (i.e. Welding, Machinery, Auto Shop, and Computer Management). The basement of the Vocational Building contains a recording studio that is no longer in use. In 2023 Tucson High's Administration announced a plan to renovate the Vocational Buildings upper wings that had sat abandoned and decaying for many years plans have begun as of January 2026. The first stage of plans with the renovation of the eastern wing of the building were completed in September 2026 with classes ready to move in 2027.

=== Technology Building ===
The Technological Sciences & Fine Arts Building (T-Building or Tech) was designed to mimic the facade of the historic Main Building with a more modern feel to it, and was completed in 1996, it is the largest building on the campus today. The Majority of the schools Visual and Performing Arts Classes are held in the western end of the Tech Building as well as the Tucsonian Yearbook and Cactus Chronicle Publication workrooms. The majority of the schools Math and Science classes are located in the Tech Building's eastern end. Constructed along with the Building was a 2 floor Bridge which connects the upper floors of the Tech Building to the Main Building.

=== Gymnasium ===
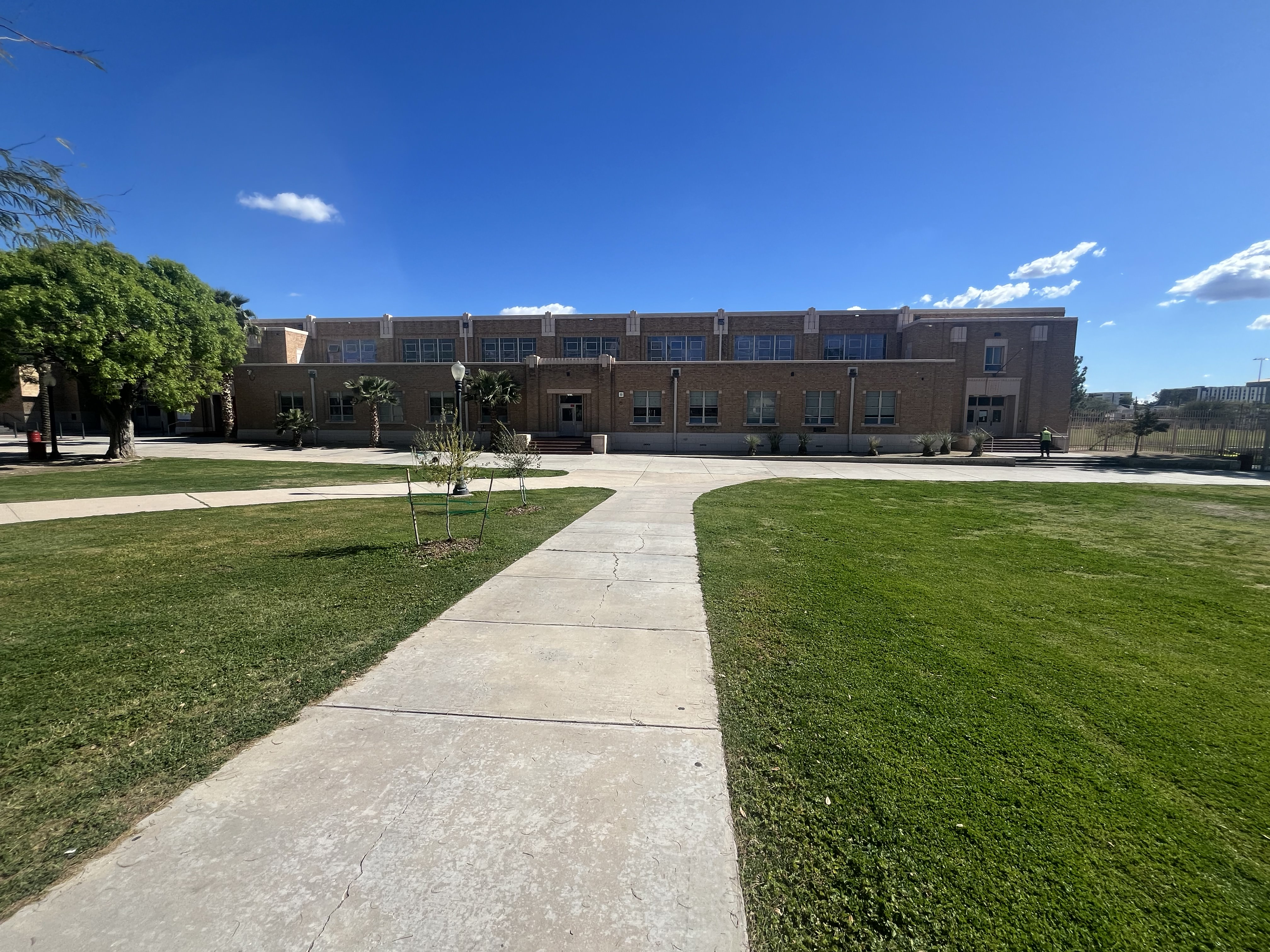
Tucson High's West (Old) Gymnasium. Built in 1939.

1939: Designed by Roy Place, The Physical Education Annex, including a gymnasium, is built to replace the existing gym on the third floor of the main building. In the gymnasium sports as well as school wide events are held. The gym holds two full-sized basketball courts, practice rooms for sports teams, and three fully equipped machine rooms.

The Reconstruction of the Building was completed in January 2011. The renovation included the building of a second gymnasium called the East Gym. This construction was designed by the architectural firm Poster Mirto McDonald costing $6.6 million. Between the East Gym and the Main Gym is the Hall of Champions, an area celebrating the dozens of state championships won by Tucson High School teams. Tucson High School's first state championship was in baseball in 1912 and its latest state championship was in boys soccer in 2014. In 1999, Tucson High was recognized as the first high school in the nation to achieve 500 wins in football, 1000 wins in basketball, and 1000 wins in baseball.

=== Cafeteria ===
The original cafeteria was built in the 3rd floor of the main building, this space has now been converted into classrooms

1945: The Physical Education Building (West Gym) is remodeled and a cafeteria is built inside this building. The cafeteria in was converted into a sports medical facility.

The building currently used as a cafeteria was built in ≈1960 and contains a kitchen and staff lounges in the back. This building also contains the school's financial office.

=== Cherry Field ===
The school's Badgers softball and baseball teams have a complex with four fields (two softball and two baseball) at East 13th Street and South Kino Parkway. The current facility was built in 2008 replacing original ball park from 1947 and added flood control basin. In 2018 the Tucson Saguaros played here.

== Notable alumni ==
- Abdi Abdirahman, Olympic long-distance runner.
- Selwa Al-Hazzaa, ophthalmologist.
- Tavo Álvarez, former Major League Baseball (MLB) player (Montreal Expos).
- Dave Baldwin, Major League Baseball pitcher.
- Frank Borman, NASA astronaut and engineer, Commander of Apollo 8.
- Jim Crawford, former MLB pitcher (Houston Astros, Detroit Tigers).
- Frank L. Culin Jr., U.S. Army major general
- Mike Dawson, St. Louis Cardinals (Pro Football).
- Fred DuVal, Clinton White House Deputy Director of Intergovernmental Affairs, and Arizona Gubernatorial candidate.
- Karl Eller, businessman and namesake of the Eller College of Management, University of Arizona.
- John Heaphy Fellowes, Captain, U.S. Navy, A-6 Intruder pilot, Vietnam War POW 1966–1973.
- Alan Fudge, actor.
- Jim Grabb, tennis player.
- Judith Rich Harris, psychologist and author.
- Ron Hassey, Major League Baseball catcher.
- Richard Hunziker, U.S. Air Force Major General.
- Curtis Kamman, U.S. ambassador and career diplomat.
- Ulysses Kay, American composer.
- Eddie Leon, Major League Baseball infielder.
- Osia Lewis, American football player.
- Tony Malaby, American Jazz Saxophonist.
- Willie Morales, former MLB player (Baltimore Orioles).
- Bob Nolan, western songwriter.
- Dennis F. Parker, musician, recording engineer.
- Alfred Quiroz, visual artist.
- Steve Rabinowitz, publicist.
- Chris Sáenz, former MLB player (Milwaukee Brewers).
- Delaney Schnell, Olympic diver.
- Shakir Smith, basketball player
- Levi Wallace, national champion defensive back at Alabama and current Pittsburgh Steelers player.
- Peggy Webber, actress, writer, director, producer.
- Tom Wilhelmsen, Major League Baseball pitcher.
