= KWXL-LP =

- Tucson, Arizona; United States
- Frequency: 98.7 MHz

Programming
- Format: Variety

Ownership
- Owner: Tucson Unified School District

Technical information
- Licensing authority: FCC
- Facility ID: 133181
- Class: L1
- ERP: 50 watts
- HAAT: −12.3 meters (−40 ft)
- Transmitter coordinates: 32°10′59″N 110°58′39″W

Links
- Public license information: LMS

KWXL-LP (98.7 FM) is a high school radio station broadcasting a variety format. Licensed to Tucson, Arizona, United States, the station serves the Tucson area. The station is currently owned by the Tucson Unified School District. KWXL-LP is Tucson's only high school radio station. It is also a news radio station for students who attend Pueblo High Magnet School. Students broadcasting over the radio station are enrolled in a "Writing/Reporting for Broadcasting" class with instructor Sarah Wilson. Originally started by Douglas Potter, who retired in 2006. Listeners can also find FM 98.7, KWXL on iTunes.
