= Catalina High School =

Public school in Tucson, Arizona

Catalina Magnet High School 520-232-8400

Location
- 3645 East Pima Street, Palo Verde; Tucson, Arizona 85716; United States; 32°14′40″N 110°54′55″W

Information
- Type: Public secondary (U.S.)
- Established: September 1955 (71 years ago)
- Oversight: Tucson Unified School District
- CEEB code: 030475
- Principal: Norma Gonzalez
- Teaching staff: 56.11 (FTE)
- Grades: 9–12
- Enrollment: 614 (2023-2024)
- Student to teacher ratio: 10.94
- Campus type: Urban
- Colors: Royal Blue and white
- Athletics: Soccer, Softball, Volleyball, Basketball, Tennis, Track and Field, Wrestling, Cheer
- Mascot: Trojan Male and Female
- Rival: Palo Verde
- Website: catalinahs.tusd1.org

Catalina High School (also known as Catalina Magnet High School) is a public high school, located on the north side of Tucson, Arizona, United States. Catalina is a magnet high school (drawing students from the entire school district) in Tucson Unified School District and serves approximately 750 students in grades 9-12. The school name originates from the Santa Catalina Mountains north of Tucson. The school mascot is the Trojan, and the school colors are royal blue and white.

== School history ==
With only one high school, Tucson High, the TUSD school board began discussion of building a second high school in the district in 1953 to meet the population growth of Tucson. In January 1957, the partially completed campus facilitated a full student body. Additional classrooms, shower and locker facilities and a science wing were added later, with 10-cent levy funds and federal aid under Public Law 815. The school presently has 65 regular classrooms and the 8-classroom science wing. R.T. Gridley was the first principal of Catalina, and the first graduating class was in May 1957. Catalina students voted for its first student council and student officers in September 1955 while still at Tucson High.

It would not be until 1959 that the original plans for the school were completed. In the 1960s Catalina was known as the Disneyland for the higher income students who attended Catalina from central Tucson and the Catalina Foothills. Shortly following the establishment of Catalina, many other high schools opened in the more affluent suburbs of Tucson, including Rincon, and Canyon del Oro.

When Pueblo and Catalina High Schools were on the planning boards in 1953, TUSD School Board member Delbert L. Secrist wanted to name them "Abraham Lincoln" and "George Washington" respectively. His fellow board members didn't go along with the idea. Catalina was named under a new TUSD school board policy of naming high schools after local mountain ranges. Catalina was built as a state-of-the art school, costing $2,496,619, to which were added extra classrooms, locker and shower facilities and a science wing, totaling 73 regular classrooms. The school was initially controversial, with critics dubbing Catalina "Disneyland", as the architecture was viewed as lavishly modern and expensive. Catalina, which had been designed for 1,500 students, opened with an enrollment of 2,000. Prior to the completion of the buildings, students had attended Tucson High on double-sessions, with Catalina students attending the morning session.

The building was designed by Scholer, Sakeller & Fuller Architects, and was built by J. J. Craviolini and L. C. Anderson.

== Awards and recognition ==
- 2023 Region Player of the Year- Women's Soccer- Julus Youbengue.
- 2023 Region Coach of the Year- IX Mendoza
- 2023 Region Athletic Director of the Year- Tim Bridges
- 2006 Girls Arizona State Cross Country Champions
- 2006 Boys Arizona State Cross County Runner Up
- 2008 Boys Arizona State Soccer Runner Up
- 2009 State MESA Runner Up
- Division champs: baseball, basketball; boys' and girls' volleyball
- National Merit Scholar winner, first place in the Arizona State Math Contest, Division A, Level II
- Winner of the National Scholastics Hall of Fame for The Trumpeteer, the school newspaper since 1957

== Academics ==
Catalina is under accreditation by the North Central Association. It is the home of three magnet programs allowing students to apply from all over the district. The aviation program has two strands. The private pilot strand gives students the opportunity to earn their pilot's certificate as part of their curriculum. The structures strand gives students the opportunity to learn to build and repair aircraft. The electronics strand teaches students about robotics. The allied health program has several strands including the Certified Nursing Assistant program, the radiology program, the athletic training program and the pharmacy technician program. The traditional magnet is a back to basics curriculum. The construction academy offers students a traditional vocational experience teaching building trades from nail and hammer and heating and air conditioning to home design. The academy is fully partnered with SAHBA and several local construction companies in the area. The career & technical academy offers students the opportunity to earn Pima Community College credit while taking their courses at Catalina. Culinary arts and digital media arts are two of the several articulated courses.

== Athletics ==
Catalina presently competes in the Arizona Interscholastic Association 3A Gila Conference, Division II. The girls were the 2006 state cross country champions.

== Air Force Junior Reserve Officers Training Corps AZ-943rd Cadet Group ==
Catalina is also home to the AZ-943 Air Force Junior Reserve Officer Training Corps Cadet Group. The unit has earned the title of Distinguished Unit for the past seven years as well as various awards for marching and community service.

Principal Rex Scott decided at the end of school year 2012-2013 to terminate the AFJROTC program in an effort to reduce the school's operating budget.

=== Awards ===
- 2004 Air Force Academy National Drill Meet Armed Drill Team Champions
- 2007 Air Force Academy National Drill Meet Armed Drill Team Champions
- 2010 Air Force Academy National Drill Meet Unarmed Drill Team Champions
- 2008 AZ State Drill Team Champions
- 2010 AZ State Drill Team Champions

== Notable alumni ==
- Ann Dusenberry (1970), actress
- Aaron Latham, writer (Urban Cowboy)
- Merl Reagle (1968), crossword puzzle creator
- Linda Ronstadt (1964), singer
- Jennifer J. Stewart (1978), children's book writer
- Kate Walsh (1986), actress, played Dr. Addison Montgomery on the television series Grey's Anatomy
