= Selwa Al-Hazzaa =

Saudi ophthalmologist

Selwa Al-Hazzaa (Arabic: سلوى الهزّاع) is a Saudi ophthalmologist and head of the ophthalmology department at King Faisal Specialist Hospital. She served as the personal ophthalmologist for the late King Fahd bin Abdulaziz Al Saud. She is one of the first Saudi women to achieve international success academically and professionally. On January 11, 2013, per a Royal Decree from King Abdullah, Al-Hazzaa became one of the first ever female members of the Saudi Arabia Shoura Council.

== Education and professional life ==
At a young age she moved with her family from Riyadh, Saudi Arabia, to Tucson, Arizona. She studied at Tucson High School, then moved back with her family to Riyadh, Saudi Arabia to complete high school studies.

She later enrolled at King Saud University to study medicine. At the time she finished medical school, ophthalmology was the only accredited residency program in Saudi Arabia, so that is what she studied. After completing her residency, she began to work at King Faisal Specialist Hospital, and was also visiting professor at Wilmer Ophthalmological Institute at The Johns Hopkins University School of Medicine from 2003 to 2009.

She has authored and co-authored many research papers, as well as a chapter on genetically inherited eye diseases in Saudi Arabia, which was the first contribution by a Saudi to the Duane Ophthalmology Medical Reference Series. In 1997, she became the first female department head in King Faisal Specialist Hospital, as she became the head of the ophthalmology department. She has also served on the Executive Council of the International Council of Ophthalmology.

== Public life ==
In 2004, Saudi Arabia’s (then all-male) Shoura Council appointed three women as advisors for the first time, of whom Al-Hazzaa was one. In 2013 a decree from King Abdullah required Saudi Arabia to include women as members of the Shoura Council for the first time. Dr. Al-Hazaa was chosen, making her the first ophthalmologist to serve on the legislative body.

Between 2004 and 2008, she also served for a time as Chair of Board of Friends of Saudi Arabia, an advocacy organisation based in the United States which was close to the Saudi regime.
