= Nymph Errant =

- Original West End programme
- Music: Cole Porter
- Lyrics: Cole Porter
- Book: Romney Brent
- Basis: Nymph Errant, a novel by James Laver
- Productions: 1933 West End

Nymph Errant is a musical with music and lyrics by Cole Porter and book by Romney Brent based upon the novel by James Laver. The somewhat controversial story concerned a young English lady intent upon losing her virginity. Porter considered the score his best because of its worldliness and sexual sophistication. The musical was produced in London in 1933 and received its US premiere in 1982.

== History ==
Charles B. Cochran, the producer, bought the stage rights in 1933 to the book by James Laver, who was then a young author, poet, and Keeper at the Victoria and Albert Museum (and was to become a major curator of art and costumes). Gertrude Lawrence convinced Cochran to turn the novel into a musical rather than a straight play, his initial intention. When Noël Coward turned down the offer to write the music, Cochran asked Porter. Because the musical was so "English" it did not receive a Broadway production, nor was it adapted as a film. Fox Film or 20th Century Fox bought the film rights but never made the film in the 1930s but used some of those rights when they made Star! with Julie Andrews. Porter referred to the show as his favorite.

== Productions ==
Nymph Errant had its tryout at the Opera House, Manchester, starting 11 September 1933. The musical opened in the West End at the Adelphi Theatre, London on 6 October 1933 and ran for 154 performances. Romney Brent directed and choreography was by Agnes de Mille. The cast featured Gertrude Lawrence as Evangeline Edwards, Elisabeth Welch as Haidee Robinson, Moya Nugent as Miss Pratt, and David Burns as Constantine. The decor and costumes were designed by Doris Zinkeisen.

The US premiere was the Equity Library Theatre, New York City production in March–April 1982.

A concert performance was given at the Theatre Royal Drury Lane, London, on 21 May 1989. Directed by Christopher Renshaw, the concert cast included Kaye Ballard, Lisa Kirk, Maureen McGovern, and Patricia Hodge. A recording of this performance was released on CD by EMI.

The Shaw Festival at Niagara-on-the-Lake, Ontario staged the musical for a short late-season run in 1989; it proved popular and was revived the following year as part of the regular season.

A Developmental Production was presented in February, 1999 by Village Theatre.

San Francisco's 42nd Street Moon produced the U.S. West Coast premiere in October, 1998. They revived the show again in 2011.

The musical ran at the Chichester Festival Theatre in August 1999.

It was presented by The Medicine Show Theatre, New York City, in February 2004.

A slimmed down Nymph Errant with a new libretto by Rob Urbinati was produced by the Prospect Theatre Company at the Harold Clurman Theatre on New York City's Theatre Row in 2012.

== Synopsis ==
Act 1, Scene 1. Oxford, England

While visiting Ermyntrude Edwards (the Aunt of Evangeline Edwards) for afternoon tea, Edith Sanford and the Reverend Malcolm Pither argue about the ability of an English lady to travel the Continent alone, unmolested. The tea ends with Pither promising to find a young, attractive, and virginal Englishwoman, who has made such a trip, to parade in front of Edith.

Act 1, Scene 2. Lausanne, Switzerland

Evangeline joins her friends (Joyce Arbuthnot-Palmer, Bertha, Henrietta, and Madeleine) in her dormitory, to pack up for her trip home after having completed her time at the Pensionnat Bellevue, a finishing school in Lausanne, Switzerland. They speak of love and sex, while enjoying Bertha's "special" cocoa. Evangeline finds herself determined to explore the world of sex. As they finish their cocoa and feverishly finish packing, Miss Pratt, their beloved Chemistry teacher, entreats them to "combine scientific and earthly pursuits" ("Experiment").

Act 1, Scene 3. Lausanne, Switzerland

Evangeline meets André de Croissant, a French theatrical producer, in a railway carriage as she travels back to Oxford. André begins to seduce Evangeline, offering to take her to France and to make her a star in his next Folies. Evangeline is wary of leaving her planned trip home ("It's Bad For Me"), but is becoming swayed. André suggests a trip to Neauville-Sur-Mer, to "teach" her things.

Madame Arthur, a fashion designer, and her son Hercule enter the carriage. They quickly provide Evangeline and Croissant with an impromptu fashion show. Evangeline is shocked at the extravagance and price of a single dress. However, when André purchases five dresses for her, she remembers to "experiment" and accepts the dresses. She has been seduced.

Act 1, Scene 4. Neuville, France

The scene opens with the beach crowd singing the virtues and pitfalls of an afternoon at the beach ("Neauville-Sur-Mer"). Madame Arthur and Hercule are chatting when Alexei, a Russian violinist joins them. Alexei tries to explain to Madame Arthur the "Russian soul". Count Mantalini joins the trio, and wonders what Alexei is currently depressed about.

After some prodding, Alexei admits that he is in love with an English girl, a friend of de Croissant, Evangeline. Madame Arthur promises to introduce Alexei to Evangeline. Clarissa Parks, a cocotte, sees the Count and Alexei and tries to join the group. She is rebuffed by Madame Arthur, much to the chagrin of Count Mantalini. As she looks back at the others, she sings ("Cocotte").

Evangeline and André enter to find Evangeline's school friend, Madeleine. Evangeline discovers that Madeleine was previously a kept woman. Madeleine was sent to Lausanne because her lover wanted a mistress with social polish. Evangeline tells her tale of meeting André, and explains that he treats her like a daughter, not a lover. As they catch up, Madame Arthur interjects herself to introduce Alexei and Mantalini.

André receives a call announcing that he has received the financial backing needed to mount his next production. However, Evangeline decides she does not want to be a star. Andre promptly disengages with her and takes Madeleine to Paris to be his star.

Mantalini takes advantage of the situation to suggest a trip with Evangeline to Venice. She reluctantly agrees, and Mantalini is off to make preparations. Once gone, Alexei comes back and expresses his love for Evangeline and begs her to go with him to Paris. When Alexei tells her to "jump in... experiment", she runs away with him ("How Could We Be Wrong").

Act 1, Scene 5. Café du Dome at Montparnasse, Paris

Alexei and Evangeline have been in Paris for an unknown length of time, but they are penniless and hungry. They enter the café, hoping to find work and food, and overhear an American and a British woman discussing a soirée featuring Olga Barshka, a Hungarian lesbian. However, Evangeline and Alexei are more interested in the buffet. They decide to crash the soirée.

Olga enters and performs ("Georgia Sand") in a dinner jacket, with two other women dressed the same way. Evangeline asks a gentleman for his newspaper to find a job, only to discover the "gentleman" is Joyce. Joyce left Lausanne, started performing with Olga, and met a painter named Pierre, a man nothing like her father, but just like her mother.

Joyce suggests that Evangeline should model for another painter, Pedro. Pedro mistakes her for a prostitute and Evangeline slaps him. When the truth is revealed, that she and Alexei are penniless party crashers, Joyce offers to lend her some money. Pierre says he will give the couple money, once he sells his paintings to his new patron. The patron arrives; it is Count Mantalini. Evangeline remembers the trip to Venice, and Mantalini reiterates his desire. With a quick apology to Alexei, Evangeline is off with Mantalini.

Act 1, Scene 6. Venice, Italy

The house staff of the Palazzo Mantalini are busy cleaning and preparing for the visiting American's next party ("They're Always Entertaining"). Count Mantalini visits his palace, which he has rented to the Bambergs. He and Daisy Bamberg discuss his desire for Daisy's daughter, Henrietta, yet another friend of Evangeline's from Lausanne. He begins to devise a scheme to pass Evangeline onto his friend Constantine.

As the Bambergs' party begins, Daisy asks Henrietta to perform ("Casanova"). Evangeline and Mantalini arrive. The two girls, surprised to see each other, quickly catch up. Mantalini takes the opportunity to explain his plan to Constantine. Constantine gets a few moments alone with Evangeline and tries to encourage her to explore the Orient with him. At the same time, Daisy and Mantalini inform Henrietta of his plans to marry her. Excited, she immediately tells Evangeline the good news. Evangeline realizes the duplicity of men ("Nymph Errant"), and resigns herself once again to a new journey, this time with Constantine.

Act 2, Scene 1. Athens, Greece

Tourists, along with Evangeline and Constantine, at the Acropolis are taking in the sights ("Ruins"). Demetrias Pappas, a friend of Constantine, runs into the couple. He is the head of a home for "unfortunate girls", and his secretary is none other than Evangeline's school chum, Bertha. They catch up, and Evangeline reveals that she is still a virgin, as "all my friends have been idealists or very tired business men."

Act 2, Scene 2. Smyrna, Turkey

Evangeline is stranded alone in Constantine's house, as fighting between Turks and Greeks erupts and there is the sound of gun-fire outside. Constantine arrives, but only for a short visit, and he is soon off again to fight the Turks. Kassim, a slave dealer, enters. Evangeline, seeing an opportunity to leave Smyrna, decides to allow herself to be sold by Kassim and off they go.

Act 2, Scene 3. A remote province of Turkey

Evangeline has been sold and married into a harem, but she complains to Ali, the harem keeper, about the lack of intimacy with her new husband, whom she has yet to meet. He asks if she has ever been in love, and she tells him of a crush she once had ("The Physician").

A new wife joins the Harem, Haidee Robinson, from San Francisco, California. She and Evangeline introduce themselves and Evangeline goes to feed the pigeons, while Haidee goes to be photographed, passing a third wife who is chanting. Haidee begins to improvise a song based on the wife's chant ("Solomon") and then exits.

Evangeline comes back into the Harem as a young American plumber, Ben Winthrop, breaks in to free Haidee. Evangeline, tired of her continued virginity, persuades Ben to rescue her instead.

Act 2, Scene 4. Arabian Desert

Evangeline and Ben settle under some palm trees and read a newspaper, wondering if this isn't better than civilization ("Back to Nature with You"). Evangeline, tired of waiting to be seduced, tries to seduce Ben. Feigning a headache, she gets Ben to rub her temples, and when he asks if there is anything else he can do, she asks him to sing, so he sings of what he knows ("Plumbing"). Not being romantic, Evangeline gives up and suggests that they move on.

Act 2, Scene 5. Paris, France

André de Croissant is rehearsing the Folies de Paris, in which Madeline has become a prima donna and won't come out of her dressing room. As the rehearsal is about to start, the Rev. Malcolm Pither and his new wife, the former Miss Pratt, stop by to see Croissant. The rehearsal begins and the chorus begins singing, at Madeline's entrance, and Evangeline wanders onto the stage.

Croissant is happy to see Evangeline again and is tired of Madeline's tantrums, so he offers her the starring role. The former Miss Pratt, excited to see her, asks her about her time since Lausanne. Evangeline expresses disbelief at her own station: a year of travels with a plethora of men, and she is still "a girl no man wants". Pither picks up on this instantly, and remembering his bet with Edith Sanford realizes that Evangeline is the niece of Ermyntrude Edwards. He asks her to go with him to visit her Aunt in Oxford, to help him to win his bet with Edith.

Evangeline wants to stay in Paris and star in the Folies, but she decides to watch Madeline's big number before deciding ("Si Vous Aimez Les Poitrines"). Evangeline is delighted, but even more delighted by the ten handsome young men who are part of the show. She asks Madeline to introduce her to them, but Madeline warns her not to expect anything from them as "a chorus boy is a chorus boy", insinuating that all ten are homosexual. Seeing no end in sight to her virginity, she decides to go back to Oxford.

Act 2, Scene 6. Oxford, England

Evangeline and Pither join Ermyntrude and Edith for tea. Pither reminds Edith of the bet they made, and all are astonished to learn of Evangeline's travels. As the others go in for tea, Evangeline asks to stay in the garden for a bit more. Now alone, she hums a bit and remembers Miss Pratt's advice ("Experiment" - Reprise), just as a young and good-looking gardener, Joe, offers her an apple. They talk for a while, and all the while Joe gets closer and closer to Evangeline. Finally, she takes the apple he offers her as the final curtain falls.

== Songs ==
- Overture (Orchestra)
- Experiment - Mrs. Pratt and chorus
- It's Bad for Me - Evangeline
- Neauville-sur-Mer - Chorus
- The Cocotte - Clarissa
- How Could We Be Wrong? - Evangeline and chorus
- They're Always Entertaining - Chorus
- Georgia Sand - Henrietta and chorus
- Nymph Errant - Evangeline and company
- Ruins - Chorus
- The Physician - Evangeline
- Solomon - Haidee
- Back to Nature with You - Evangeline and Ben
- Plumbing - Ben
- Si vous aimez les poitrines - Madeline and chorus
- You're Too Far Away - Alexei
- Sweet Nudity ‡ - Girls and Boys
- Cazanova - Henrietta
- Concert Finale:Experiment - Company

‡ Cut before the London opening, with Cochran agreeing to drop the nude scene if the censor permitted the other "racy" songs to remain.
