= Tucson Unified School District =

School district in Arizona, U.S.

Location
- Tucson, surrounding areas Arizona United States

District information
- Type: Public
- Grades: Pre K-12
- Established: 1867
- Superintendent: Dr. Gabriel Trujillo
- Schools: 89
- Budget: $566 million

Students and staff
- Students: 41,430

Other information
- Website: central.tusd1.org

Tucson Unified School District (TUSD) is the largest school district of Tucson, Arizona, in terms of enrollment. Dr. Gabriel Trujillo is the superintendent, appointed on September 12, 2017, by the Governing Board. As of 2016, TUSD had more than 47,670 students. As of Fall 2012, according to Superintendent John Pedicone (on the 9/14/2012 Buckmaster Show), TUSD had 50,000 students. District enrollment has declined over the last 10 years and TUSD lost 1,700 to 2,000 students per year for the two or three years prior to 2012.

== Area ==
The district boundaries encompass Tucson, South Tucson, Drexel Heights, and Valencia West. Parts of Tucson Estates, Catalina Foothills and Tanque Verde are also within the district, as well as a few unincorporated parts of Pima County that do not fall within the confines of a Census Designated Place. The district was established as "Pima County School District No. 1" in 1867, centered approximately at the latitude 32°13'15.57"N and the longitude 110°58'23.70"W (a monument now known as La Placita), and assumed its current name in 1977.

== Controversy ==
=== Ethnic Studies Ban ===
In 2012, in response to state law HB2281, the district put into storage, or distributed to the district libraries, several books used in a course that were determined to be against state law A.R.S. 15–112, including the textbook Rethinking Columbus and the Tempest. Books were taken away while students were in class.

The dismantling of the Mexican-American studies departments and similar Mexican cultural courses has caused controversy regarding the ideas of xenophobia and racism against Mexican-American students and their heritage. However, studies demonstrated that students enrolled in these programs had higher rates of graduation and attendance.

The TUSD board meetings, in response to the proposed bill HB2281, resulted in several students and faculty who demonstrated against the legislation being arrested and/or injured. Due to the impending loss of state funding should the TUSD continue the program, the board ruled in a 4-1 decision in January 2012 to ban the program. On January 13, 2012, students walked out of class and held a protest against the banishment of the Mexican-American Studies program.

The Daily Show aired a satirical piece on April 2, 2012, concerning the banning of Mexican-American studies as voted by the school board. Michael Hicks, a voting member, said that he was concerned with the "revolutionary" aspect of the curriculum that encouraged students to take part in "bloodshed" against the "gringos." When asked if he had ever been to a class himself to support his claims, he answered that he had not visited the school but based his opinion on "hearsay from the others."

The TUSD Governing Board's resolution of this issue has been to establish a course to be taken by all students that emphasizes multiculturalism and diversity. The current program, much like the Mexican studies program, seeks to educate students on themes of identity. It is based on four pillars namely, "identity, diversity, justice and action." This program strives to "promote intercultural understanding and addresses the needs of students who have been historically marginalized or underrepresented." Some students and their parents sued the school board and government, claiming that the TUSD ban of the Mexican American studies program violated their rights under the First and 14th amendments. In August 2017, A. Wallace Tashima, a federal judge, ruled that the students and parents had had their rights violated on both counts. A US judge in 2017 also blocked an ethnic studies ban because he found the ban to be racially motivated.

=== Fisher v. Tucson Unified Sch. Dist. ===
In 1974, African American and Mexican American students sued the Tucson, Arizona, school system alleging intentional segregation and unconstitutional discrimination on the basis of race and national origin. The case was closed on July 20, 2022.

Fisher v. Tucson Unified Sch. Dist., No. CV-74-00090-TUC-DCB (Lead Case) No. CV-74-0204-TUC-DCB (Consolidated Case)

=== "Black List" ===
In May 2017 the long-rumored "black list" of employees blocked from future hire was discovered, first created in August 2012. Despite the TUSD's stated hiring policies, in January 2018, it was discovered that the list spanned 20 years and 1,400 entries, with about 900 of those former employees claiming that they were blacklisted wrongfully and without notice, for unfirable items such as "personality clashes" with superiors, poor evaluation scores, or using all their vacation time. Only 516 of those listings were clearly justified.

== Language Education ==
TUSD came under fire for cuts to the high school graduation requirements made in the year 2008— in years prior, senior high school students at TUSD were required to obtain at least two years of foreign language education in order to receive their high school diploma. In 2008, the TUSD School board approved to revoke the mandate that required the two years of foreign language education for each graduating student, citing budget cuts as the overarching problem. The prominent Tucson newspaper, the Arizona Daily Star, later printed an editorial addressing the new requirement, agreeing that they would rather see the budget cuts being made in the language department than in others, and stating that TUSD and the School Board did the reasonable thing under the situation. Others disagreed with the mandate, expressing their concern on the fact that most public and private universities, including Tucson's own University of Arizona, require at least two years of a high school foreign language class for admission.

== Demographics ==
As of October 2018, the demographics of the district were composed of: 63.8% Hispanic (of any race, primarily Mexican American), 20.5% non-Hispanic Whites, 6.0% Black, 3.6% Native American, 2.1% Asian, and 3.9% Multi-racial.

== Schools ==
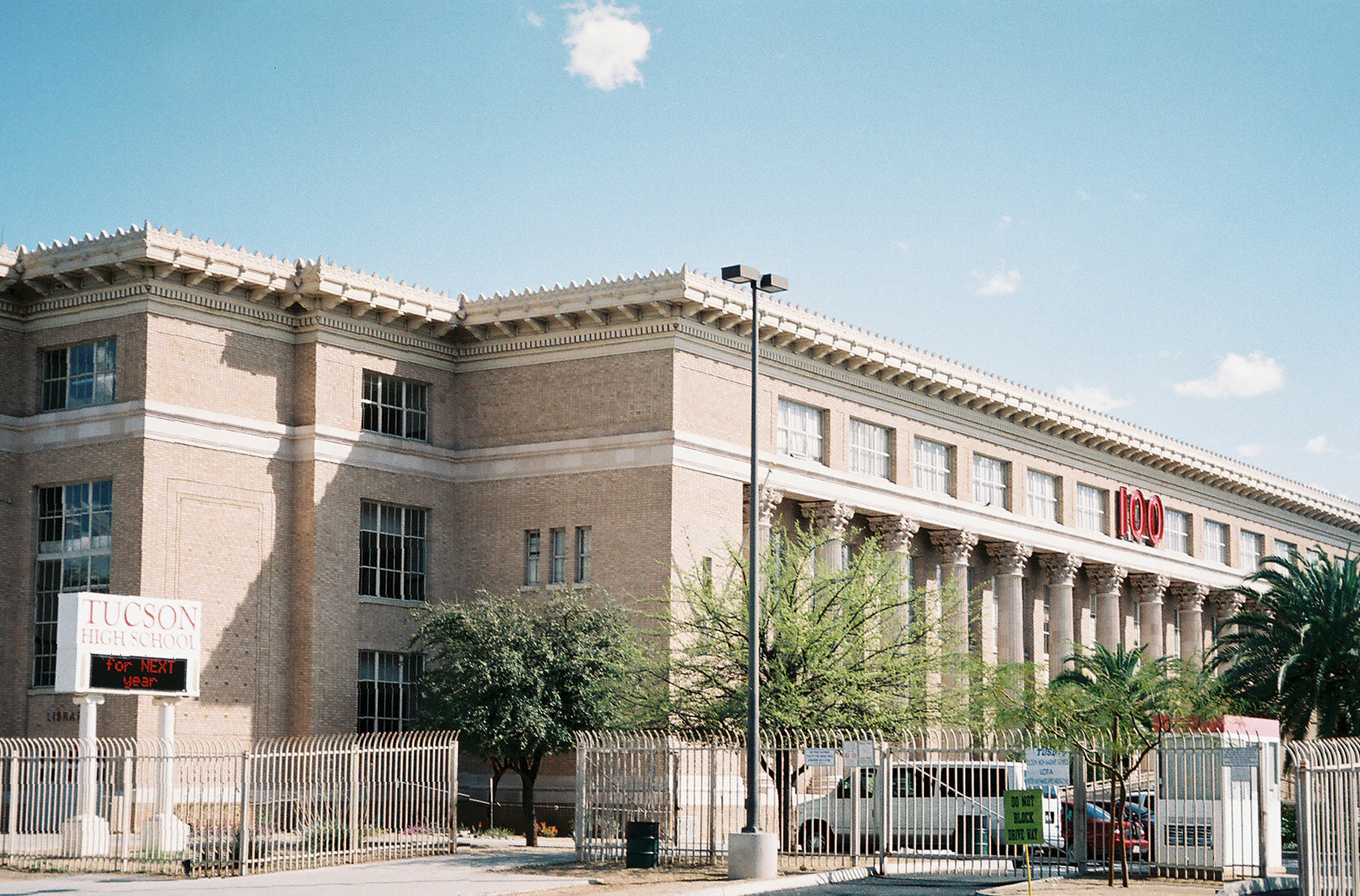
Tucson High Magnet School

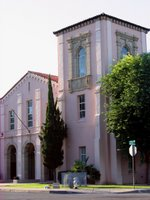
Mansfeld Middle School

=== Traditional high schools (9) ===
TUSD high schools
| School | Enrollment | Establishment | Mascot | Colors |
|---|---|---|---|---|
| Catalina | 900 | 1957 | Trojans | Royal blue and white |
| Cholla | 1,786 | 1969 | Chargers | Orange and Navy blue |
| Palo Verde* | 1,050 | 1962 | Titans | Royal blue and gold |
| Pueblo | 1,800 | 1956 | Warriors | Navy blue and Columbia blue |
| Rincon | 1,250 | 1958 | Rangers | Purple and white |
| Sabino | 1,000 | 1972 (as 7-12 school) | Sabercats | Purple and Gold |
| Sahuaro | 1,736 | 1968 | Cougars | Red and Blue |
| Santa Rita | 500 | 1969 | Eagles | Green and Gold |
| Tucson* | 3,300 | 1892 | Badgers | Red and white |

Magnet program*

The largest high school in the district, in terms of enrollment, is Tucson High Magnet School near downtown Tucson. According to the district website, 2945 students attended Tucson High during the 2006–2007 school year. It is also the oldest high school in the district. Tucson High School was built in 1907 across the street from where it now stands. The school relocated to its present site in 1923. In 1956, the school had the largest enrollment of any high school in the United States, over 6,800 pupils. The original Tucson High building still exists as Roskruge Bilingual K-8 Magnet School. The TUSD also owns the radio station KWXL-LP.

==== Other high schools (7) ====
| Name | Est. | Mascot | Colors |
|---|---|---|---|
| ArtWorks Academy | | | |
| Aztec Middle College East | 1981 | | |
| Aztec Middle College West | | | |
| Howenstine Adaptive Education High School | 1976 | Hawks | Baby blue and black closed in 2013 |
| Innovation Tech High School | 2020 | Dragons | Blue |
| PASS Alternative High School | | | |
| Project MORE | | Siberian Tigers | |
| Teenage Parent Alt. Middle/High School | | Kangaroo and Joey | |
| University High School (shares campus and sports teams with Rincon) | 1977 | Penguins | Black and White |

=== Traditional middle schools and K-8 schools ===
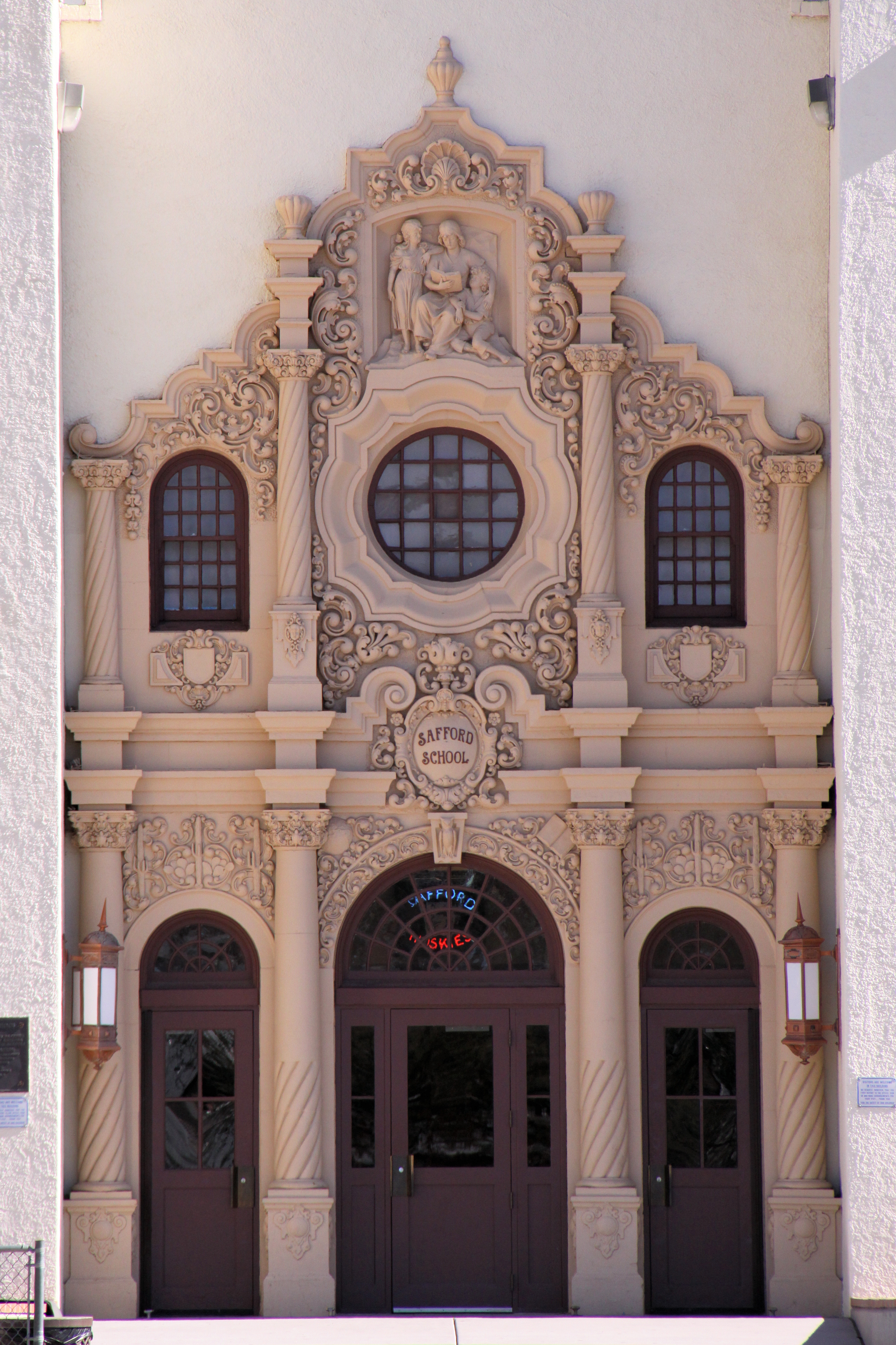
Safford School entrance. Built 1918. Architect: Annie Rockfellow.

| Name | Location | Est. | Mascot | Colors |
|---|---|---|---|---|
| Ida Flood Dodge Traditional Magnet Middle School | | 1954 (as Lizzie Brown Elementary School) | Bulldogs | Turquoise and Black |
| Doolen Middle School | Doolen-Fruitvale | 1942 (as Catalina Junior High School) | Thunderbirds | Burgundy and White |
| Rollin T. Gridley Middle School | Halcyon Acres | 1974 | Grizzly Bears | |
| Joseph W. Magee Middle School | Carriage Hill | December 9, 1963 | Roadrunners | Light Blue and Red |
| Mansfeld Magnet Middle School | Drake | 1930 | Bulldogs | Blue and White |
| Mary Belle McCorkle PreK-8 School | Casitas Del Sol | 2011 | Mustangs | Silver and Black |
| William J. Pistor Middle School | Manzanita Manor | 1970 | Panthers | |
| Roskruge Bilingual K-8 Magnet School (Elementary and middle schools became one school in 2010.) | West University | 1914 | Pumas/Cougars | Turquoise, Black, Purple, Gold |
| Delbert L. Secrist Middle School | South Harrison | 1973 | Scorpions | Maroon and Yellow |
| Madge Utterback Middle Magnet School | Sunland Vista | 1959 | Unicorns | |
| Alice Vail Middle School | Desert Aire | September 6, 1955 | Falcons | |
| Valencia Middle School | Drexel Heights | October 3, 1994 | Jaguars | Black and Gold |
| Wakefield Middle School (Consolidated into Madge Utterback, Charles Hollinger, & Safford in 2013) Reopened in 2020. | Whitestone | 1939 | Knights | |

=== K-8 schools ===
| Name | Est. | Mascot | Location | Colors |
|---|---|---|---|---|
| Booth-Fickett Math-Science K-8 School | Fred W. Fickett Junior High School established 1960, Booth Elementary School established 1961, merger occurred 1984 | Falcons | Vista Del Sahuaro | |
| Borman K-8 School | Davis-Monthan Air Force Base | Astros | Opened 1977, historically fed into Naylor | |
| C. E. Rose Pre-K-8 School | National City | Wildcats | Opened 1949; Named for Clinton E. Rose, TUSD Superintendent from 1920 to 1941. Selected for 2012 NCUST Excellence in Education Award., historically fed into Wakefield | |
| Charles Dietz K-8 School | 1961 (as elementary school) | Dragons | Mañana Grande | |
| Charles Hollinger K-8 School | 1931 (as Government Heights Elementary School) | Bulldogs | Whitestone | |
| Drachman Montessori K-8 Magnet School | Barrio Santa Rosa | Dragons | Opened 1901; Montessori school, historically fed into the junior high division of Safford | |
| Mary Louise Robins K-8 School | August 15, 1994 (as elementary school) | Roadrunners | Agua Dulce | |
| Miles Exploratory Learning Center | originally opened as an elementary in 1921 and then years later, it became a K-8 school | Mustangs | Tucson | Blue, Gold |
| Morgan Maxwell K-8 School | 1974 (as junior high) | Mountain Lions | | Blue |
| Roberts/Naylor K-8 School | 1962 (as Naylor Junior High School) | Phoenixes | Carlita Village | |
| Safford K-8 Magnet International Baccalaureate World School | Plaza or 1-8 School opened in Fall 1884 by October 1. Mansfield Elementary School opened to the south of it in 1904 and Plaza renamed simultaneously, making it Safford Junior High School. Safford Junior High burned down in 1917 and was rebuilt. Mansfield Elementary was renamed Safford Elementary in 1930. Merger of 2 schools occurred by 2003. | Huskies | Armory Park | Orange and Blue |

=== Elementary schools ===
| Name | Location | Mascot | Notes |
| Laura Nobles Banks Elementary School | Tucson Estates | Bobcats | Opened 2002 historically fed into Maxwell |
| Blenman Elementary School | New Deal Acres | Eagles | Opened 1942, historically fed into Doolen |
| Clara Ferrin Bloom Elementary School | Hidden Hills West | Eagles | Opened 1973, historically fed into Magee |
| Ignacio Bonillas Basic Curriculum Magnet School | Franklin Heights | Beavers | Opened 1954, historically fed into Vail |
| Elizabeth Borton Elementary Magnet School | Bruckners | | Opened 1927, historically fed into the junior high division of Safford |
| Carillo K-5 Magnet School | Barrio Viejo | Cougars | Opened 1930; Magnet Theme: Communication & Creative Arts, historically fed into the junior high division of Safford |
| Lillian Cavett Elementary School | Western Hills 2 | Eagles | Opened 1956, historically fed into Utterback |
| Marguerite L. Collier Elementary School | Tanque Verde | Cougars | Opened 1974, historically fed into the junior high division of Sabino |
| J. Knox Corbett Elementary School | San Paulo Village | Cougars | Opened 1955; Consolidated into Wheeler in 2013, historically fed into Naylor |
| Gertrude Cragin Elementary School | Shaheen Estates | Cougars | Opened 1950, historically fed into Doolen |
| Davidson Elementary School | Rillito Crossing | Dragons | Originally the sole school of the now annexed Pima County Elementary School District No. 18., historically fed into Doolen |
| Davis Bilingual Elementary Magnet School | McKinley Park | Eagles | Opened March 10, 1902, Renamed Davis-Romero in 2025. Historically fed into the now closed John E. Spring Junior High School |
| Alice F. Dunham Elementary School | Arizona La Victoria | Panthers | Opened 1974, historically fed into Secrist |
| Irene Erickson Elementary School | Vista Del Prado | | Opened 1968, historically fed into Carson |
| Inez C. Ford Elementary School | Lakeside | Panthers | Opened 1972, historically fed into Carson |
| Fort Lowell Elementary School | Cloverleaf | | Merged with Townsend Middle School in 2010. Originally the sole school of the now annexed Fort Lowell Elementary School District (a. k. a. Pima County Elementary School District No. 9) Ft Lowell/Townsend closed in 2013. Historically fed into Townsend. |
| Jacob C. Fruchthendler Elementary School | Sabino Vista | Firebirds | Opened 1971, historically fed into the junior high division of Sabino |
| Laura O. Gale Elementary School | Estes Park | Tigers | Opened 1969, historically fed into Gridley |
| Grijalva Elementary School | Midvale Park | Grizzlies | Named for U.S. Congressman and former TUSD Governing Board member Raúl Grijalva. Bilingual Ed. and Gifted Education; Opened 1987, historically fed into Pistor |
| Anna Henry Elementary School | Northeast | Gila Monsters | Opened 1971, historically fed into Gridley |
| Holladay Magnet Elementary School | Grand View | RedHawks | Opened 1951; Magnet Theme: Visual & Performing Arts, historically fed into Utterback |
| Peter E. Howell Elementary School | Peter Howell | Hawks | Opened 1950 as Longfellow Elementary School, historically fed into Vail |
| Hudlow Elementary School | Kingston Knolls Terrace | Hawks | Opened 1959, historically fed into Fred W. Fickett Junior High School |
| Sam Hughes Elementary School | Alta Vista | Huskies | Opened 1927, historically fed into Mansfeld |
| Jefferson Park Elementary School | Jefferson Park | Panthers | Opened September 1945; Closed in 2010 and merged with Blenman Elementary., historically fed into the junior high division of Roskruge |
| Harriet Johnson Primary School | Drexel Heights | | Opened 1991; K-2 |
| Julia Keen Elementary School | Bel Air Annex No. 2 | Cougars | Opened 1953, closed 2004, historically fed into Mansfeld |
| Annie W. Kellond Elementary School | Mañana Vista | Cougars | Opened 1956, historically fed into Fickett |
| Anna E. Lawrence 3-8 School | Drexel Heights | Lobos | Opened 1973 (as elementary school), historically fed into Hohokam |
| Adah Lineweaver Elementary School | Northeast | Lions | Opened 1956, historically fed into Vail |
| Lynn/Urquides Elementary School | Phebus Estates | Coyotes | Opened 1951 as Mary Lynn Elementary School; Pre-K-5, historically fed into Wakefield |
| Nan E. Lyons Elementary School | Pine Grove | Lions | Opened 1973; Consolidated into Inez C. Ford, & Irene Erickson in 2013, historically fed into Carson |
| Amelia Maldonado Elementary School | Drexel Heights | Bob Cats | Pre-K-5; Opened 1987, historically fed into Hohokam |
| Ricardo Manzo Elementary School | El Río Park | Bobcats | Opened March 10, 1939 as El Rio Elementary School; Pre-K-5, historically fed into Maxwell |
| Sara Marshall Elementary School | Rolling Hills | Mustangs | Opened 1964; Pre-K–5, historically fed into Secrist |
| Menlo Park Elementary School | Menlo Park | | Opened Fall 1917; Consolidated into Ricardo Manzo, Morgan Maxwell, & Andy Tolson in 2013, historically fed into Maxwell |
| Miller Elementary School | Mission Ridge | Mustangs | Opened 1981; Pre-K–5, historically fed into Hohokam |
| Mission View Elementary School | Mission View | Coyotes | Opened 1922; Pre-K–5, historically fed into Wakefield |
| Myers-Ganoung Elementary School | Mayfair Terrace | Mustangs | Opened 1960 as Myers Elementary School; Pre-K–5, historically fed into Naylor |
| Ochoa Community Magnet School | Southern Heights | Panthers | Opened 1921; Reggio Emilia inspired school, historically fed into the junior high division of Safford |
| Oyama Elementary School | Casas Oestes | Dragons | Opened 2003; According to historian David Leighton, of the Arizona Daily Star newspaper this school is named in honor of Hank Oyama, historically fed into Maxwell |
| Pueblo Gardens K-8 School | Pueblo Gardens | Panthers | Opened 1951; Now a Pre-K-8, historically fed into Utterback |
| Kate B. Reynolds Elementary School | Valley View East | | Opened February 14, 1972; Closed in 2010; Part of area west of Prudence Road, & north of Escalante Road merged with Irene Erickson; Part of area east of Prudence, & north of Escalante merged with Inez C. Ford; Part of area south of Escalante merged with Nan Lyons, historically fed into Carson |
| Richey K-8 | Pascua | Roadrunners | Closed in 2010. K-5 students assigned to Roskruge; 6-8 students assigned to Mansfeld Magnet., elementary attendance area and junior high (later middle) attendance area coterminous with one another |
| Clara Fish Roberts Elementary School | Telesco Terrace | | Opened 1960; Merged with Naylor Middle School in 2010., historically fed into Naylor |
| Robison Magnet Elementary School | Arroyo Chico | Roadrunners | Opened 1950; International Baccalaureate World School, historically fed into Mansfeld |
| Anne E. Rogers Elementary School | Colonia Del Valle | Roadrunners | Opened 1956; Part of area north of 22nd Street consolidated into Annie W. Kellond, and part south of 22nd Street consolidated into Corbett in 2010., historically fed into Vail |
| Roskruge Elementary School | West University | Cougars | Same building as Roskruge Bilingual Magnet Middle School (which it historically fed into). In 2010, schools merged to become Roskruge Bilingual K-8 Magnet School. Building housed Tucson High School from 1907 to 1923. Named for George J. Roskruge. |
| Schumaker Elementary School | Carriage Hill | Lions | Opened 1964; Consolidated into Clara Ferrin Bloom, and Anna Henry in 2013, historically fed into Magee |
| W. Arthur Sewell Elementary School | Indian House Estates | Sabercats | Opened 1959, historically fed into Townsend |
| Soleng Tom Elementary School | Rancho Del Este | | Opened September 5, 1989; Gifted and Talented Education(GATE). Named for Soleng Tom (1912–2000), historically fed into Gridley |
| Harold Steele Elementary School | Sherwood Village Terrace | Stallions | Opened 1961; Pre-K-5, historically fed into Gridley |
| Andy Tolson Elementary School | Southwest | Thunderbirds | Opened 1972; Pre-K-5, historically fed into Maxwell |
| Tully Elementary Magnet School | El Río Estates | Tigers | Opened 1956; Gifted and Talented Education(GATE), historically fed into Maxwell |
| Katherine Van Buskirk Elementary School | Fairgrounds | Bears | Opened 1957, historically fed into Utterback |
| James D. Van Horne Elementary School | Silver Shadows Estates | Vikings | Opened 1974; Part of area north of Tanque Verde Road merged into Jacob C. Fruchtendler, and part of area south of Tanque Verde Road merged into Clara Ferrin Bloom in 2010., historically fed into Magee |
| Vesey Elementary School | Drexel Heights | Wildcats | Opened 1969, historically fed into Valencia |
| Frances J. Warren Elementary School | Drexel Heights | | Opened 1975, historically fed into Pistor |
| Winnie E. Wheeler Elementary School | Terra Del Sol | | Opened 1959; Pre-K-5, historically fed into Fickett |
| John E. White Elementary School | Garden City | Bulldogs | Opened 1960, historically fed into Pistor |
| W. V. Whitmore Elementary School | Northeast | Wildcats | Opened 1960, historically fed into Townsend |
| John B. Wright Elementary School | Sierra Vista | Wildcats | Opened 1954; Pre-K-5, historically fed into Doolen |
| Wrightstown Elementary School | Desert Palms Park | | According to historian David Leighton, of the Arizona Daily Star newspaper, this school which was torn down, was named in honor of the town it served Wrightstown. The town was founded by Fred Wright who also constructed the first school, which was originally the sole school of Wrightstown Elementary School District (a.k.a. School District No. 33, Pima County, founded 1914), annexed by TUSD on July 1, 1953. Part of area east of Houghton Road, & north of Speedway Boulevard merged with Soleng Tom, & rest of area with Anna Henry in 2010., historically fed into Magee |

=== Other schools ===
| Name | Comments |
| Direct Link | For homebound students |
| Mary Meredith K-12 | For emotionally disabled students |
| Miles Exploratory Learning Center | Pre-school to grade 8. Named for Nelson A. Miles. Originally a standard elementary school that opened in 1921. |
| Augustus Brichta | Named for the first school teacher in Tucson. TUSD Infant and Early Learning Center |
| Schumaker | TUSD Infant and Early Learning Center |

== Former schools ==
Congress Street School - It was the first facility in the Arizona Territory used for a school maintained with government funds, being established in 1875. In 1976 it reopened as a school for middle schoolers struggling with mainstream education.

- Augustus Brichta Elementary School (Consolidated into Morgan Maxwell, & Andy Tolson in 2013)
- Duffy Elementary School (Closed in 2010; Part of area south of Broadway Boulevard, and north of 22nd Street consolidated into Ignacio Bonillas; Part of area north of Broadway Boulevard, and west of Rosemont Boulevard consolidated into Peter Howell; Part of area south of 22nd Street, and between Country Club Road, and Palo Verde Avenue merged into Robison; Part of area north of Broadway Boulevard, and east of Rosemont Boulevard, merged into W. Arthur Sewell)
- Charles A. Carson Middle School (Consolidated into Delbert L. Secrist, & Charles Dietz 2013)
- Hohokam Middle School (Consolidated into Valencia in 2013)

== Health Initiatives ==
The Tucson Unified School District has a number of policies that encourage a healthy lifestyle for its students and employees. The District Wellness Program states that, "Schools shall implement a comprehensive, integrated program for these two components of a coordinated school health program: nutrition and physical activity". To meet United States Department of Agriculture nutrition requirements, many of the breakfast and lunch options the TUSD offers are whole grain, like whole wheat bread, whole wheat pasta and whole wheat hot dog and hamburger buns. In addition, milk, fruits, and vegetables are always offered to students as sides. The TUSD also requires that fundraising events that involve the sale of food meet the same health requirements that school lunches do, though special events such as sports are exempt. Advertisements, such as those on the front of vending machines, must encourage students to purchase healthier options, like water; and other a la carte foods that do not meet health regulations can be offered on only an "infrequent basis."

The TUSD addresses other challenges by recognizing that students will make health decisions based largely on the influence of their role models, like their parents/guardians and teachers. Therefore, the TUSD attempts to communicate with parents and guardians through a variety of channels about the benefits of a healthy lifestyle, and guardians are encouraged to pack lunches that meet USDA suggestions if their students do not purchase food from the school. Newsletters published by the district also contain lists of foods that meet health regulations and would be popular for celebrations, such as birthday parties. Furthermore, the district provides an Employee Wellness Committee, which provides health education to district employees, offers free physical activities for staff to partake in and opportunities for staff to monitor their own health and goals.

To meet the physical activity aspect of the mission statement, the TUSD has partnered with the National Association for Sport and Physical Education (NASPE) to provide standards regarding physical education and recess for younger grades. The NASPE provides physical education teachers with appropriate time ranges that students should be active for, the number of times per week students should participate in physical activity, and suggestions to make physical education more individualized. The TUSD also requires that schools have opportunities for students to be physically active before, during and after school, which incorporates recess, varsity and intramural sports, and open gyms and tracks. As with school lunches, the district also encourages parents and guardians to be physically active with their children and to encourage an overall healthy lifestyle.

The TUSD also supports health initiatives made by individual schools. For example, Sam Hughes Elementary School has a community garden and offers culinary classes to its students as part of Michelle Obama's Let's Move! campaign. The "Greening Group" at the school maintains the garden and is funded by the school's Parent Teacher Association.
