= Lady Susan =

Novella by Jane Austen (written in 1794)

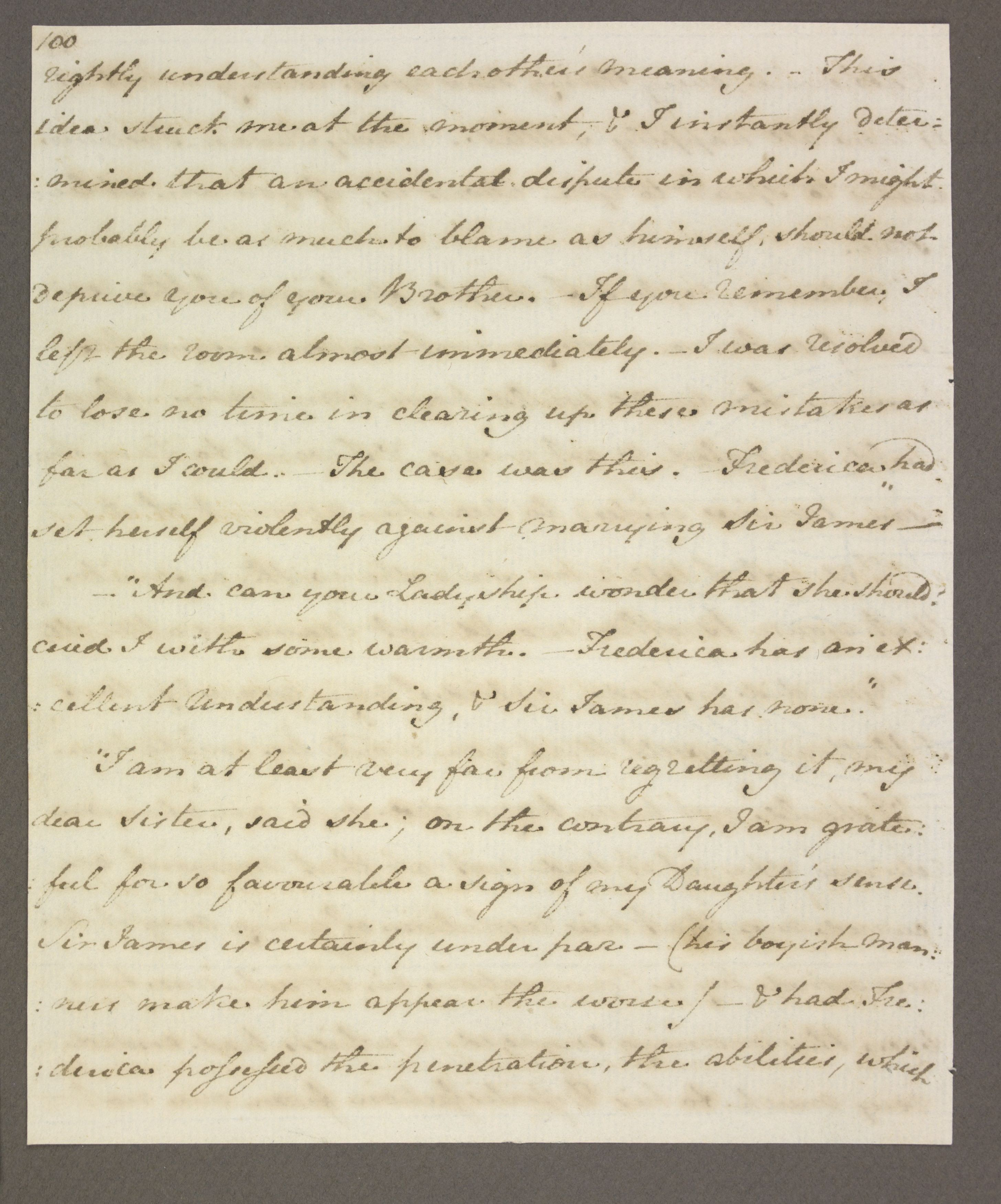
- Lady Susan Manuscript 103
- Author: Jane Austen
- Language: English
- Genre: Epistolary novella
- Published: 1871 (written in 1794)
- Publication place: United Kingdom
- Media type: Print (hardback & paperback)

Lady Susan is an epistolary novella by Jane Austen, written circa 1794 but not published until 1871. This early complete work, which the author never submitted for publication, describes the schemes of the title character.

== Synopsis ==
Lady Susan Vernon, a recent widow, visits the brother of her recently deceased husband and his wife, Charles and Catherine Vernon, with little advance notice, at their country residence. Catherine is displeased, as Lady Susan had tried to prevent her marriage to Charles and her unwanted guest has been described to her as "the most accomplished coquette in England". Among Lady Susan's conquests is the married Mr. Manwaring. Lady Susan had been staying at the Manwarings' residence but had to leave rather abruptly after she seduced both Mr. Manwaring and his younger sister's fiancé.

Catherine's brother Reginald arrives a week later, wanting desperately to meet the Lady Susan that everyone speaks so poorly of, and despite Catherine's strong warnings about Lady Susan's character, soon falls under her spell. Lady Susan toys with the younger man's affections for her own amusement and later because she perceives it makes her sister-in-law uneasy. Her confidante, Alicia Johnson, to whom she writes frequently, recommends she marry the very eligible Reginald, but Lady Susan considers him to be greatly inferior to Manwaring.

Frederica, Lady Susan's 16-year-old daughter, tries to run away from school when she learns of her mother's plan to marry her off to a wealthy but insipid young man she loathes -- the previous fiancé of Mr. Manwaring's daughter, who is still in love with Lady Susan. She also becomes a guest at Churchill. Despite how poorly Susan speaks of her daughter, Catherine comes to like Frederica -- her character is totally unlike her mother's -- and as time goes by, detects Frederica's growing attachment to the oblivious Reginald.

Later, Sir James Martin, Frederica's unwanted suitor, shows up uninvited, much to her distress and her mother's vexation. When Frederica begs Reginald for support out of desperation (having been forbidden by Lady Susan to turn to Charles and Catherine), she causes a temporary breach between Reginald and Lady Susan, but the latter soon repairs the rupture.

Lady Susan decides to return to London and marry her daughter off to Sir James. Reginald follows, still bewitched by her charms and intent on marrying her, but he encounters Mrs. Manwaring at the home of Mr. Johnson and finally learns Lady Susan's true character. Alicia writes that her husband has forbidden her to meet with or write to Susan anymore, at the threat of them moving full-time to the countryside. Lady Susan ends up marrying Sir James herself, and allows Frederica to reside with Charles and Catherine at Churchill, where Reginald De Courcy "could be talked, flattered, and finessed into an affection for her."

== Main characters ==
- Lady Susan Vernon: One of the primary correspondents of the novel, Lady Susan Vernon is about 35 years old. She is a recent widow in need of money. She flagrantly manipulates and flirts with men. She wants to marry off her daughter Frederica and procure an even better match for herself. She is described as "excessively pretty...delicately fair, with fine grey eyes and dark eyelashes" and appearing ten years younger than her actual age.

Lady Susan is contemptuous of her daughter. Jane Austen may have drawn on the character of her neighbour Mrs. Craven, a beautiful woman who abused her daughters until they ran away from home or married beneath their class to escape.

- Frederica Vernon: Daughter of Lady Susan. Oppressed by her mother, Frederica is not as beautiful as her mother. She is a very shy, sweet girl whose kind nature is at odds with Lady Susan's venal selfishness, which endears her to the Vernons.
- Catherine Vernon: The other primary correspondent of the novel and sister-in-law to Lady Susan. She is horrified by Lady Susan and grows deeply attached to Frederica.
- Charles Vernon: Catherine's husband, and brother of Lady Susan's late spouse.
- Reginald De Courcy: Brother of Catherine Vernon. He is handsome and kind but rather gullible. Lady Susan enjoys manipulating him.
- Lady De Courcy: Mother of Catherine Vernon. She trusts her daughter's judgement and is concerned that Reginald not be taken in by Lady Susan.
- Alicia Johnson: The main recipient of Lady Susan's letters. She delights in Lady Susan's machinations and encourages them.

== Writing ==
Jane Austen worked on several novels between 1793 and 1800, including Pride and Prejudice and Northanger Abbey. It is unclear when she wrote Lady Susan. Estimates usually place it in this period.

Sense and Sensibility also originates in this period, and Austen's first draft of that novel was composed of letters between two Dashwood sisters. Grounding Lady Susan in the female perspective through their correspondence was subversive. Austen seems to tire of composing letters and breaks off the narrative with a "Conclusion" that reverts to the patriarchal perspective. The ending gently mocks the novel's epistolary format.

In a 1920 book, Mary Austen-Leigh suggested that, unlike most of Jane Austen's fiction, Lady Susan was modeled on a real person. R.W. Chapman identified the woman as Mrs. Craven. This initiated a fruitless parlor game of guessing the identities behind all of Austen's characters.

== Adaptations ==
=== Film ===
Whit Stillman's adaptation of Lady Susan, retitled Love & Friendship after Austen's juvenile work of that name, was included in the Sundance Film Festival in January 2016. The US release date was 13 May 2016. The film stars Kate Beckinsale, Chloë Sevigny, Xavier Samuel and Stephen Fry. It received strongly positive reviews.

=== Stage ===
A stage adaptation by Bonnie Milne Gardner called Lady Susan: Jane Austen's Distinguished Flirt was performed at Ohio Wesleyan University in 1998.

A two-woman version of Lady Susan, adapted by Inis Theatre, played at the Dublin fringe festival in 2001–2.

An adaptation by Christine U'Ren was performed by Bella Union Theatre Company at the Berkeley City Club in Berkeley, California, in July 2009.

In November 2020, Jane Austen's Lady Susan (a play) by Rob Urbinati was published by Samuel French. and its world premier performance was produced October 2021 by the Good Theater at the St. Lawrence Arts Center in Portland, Maine.

=== Fiction ===
Lady Susan (a novel) is a 1980 complete re-write by Phyllis Ann Karr. In 2009, a novel-length reconstruction of Lady Susan was published by Crown Publishing as Lady Vernon and Her Daughter. Written by mother-and-daughter co-authors Jane Rubino and Caitlen Rubino-Bradway, the adaptation reinterprets the work to conform closely to Austen's more mature prose style.

A further adaptation of the text, in the form of a novelization by director Whit Stillman, was announced for publication to coincide with the general release of the film (under the same title) on 13 May 2016, starring Kate Beckinsale. Alexandra Alter of The New York Times states in her 2016 interview article with Stillman, describing the novelization: "In the novel, Mr. Stillman takes the characters and plot from Austen's fictionalized letters and narrates the tale from the perspective of Lady Susan's nephew, who hopes to counter criticism of his maligned aunt. The 41 letters from Austen's Lady Susan are included in an appendix." Stillman told Alter that he felt Lady Susan was not quite finished and thought the form of the book was "so flawed". After realising that there was another story to be told, he convinced the publisher Little, Brown and Company to let him write the novel.
