= Drexel Heights, Arizona =

CDP in Pima County, Arizona

- CDP
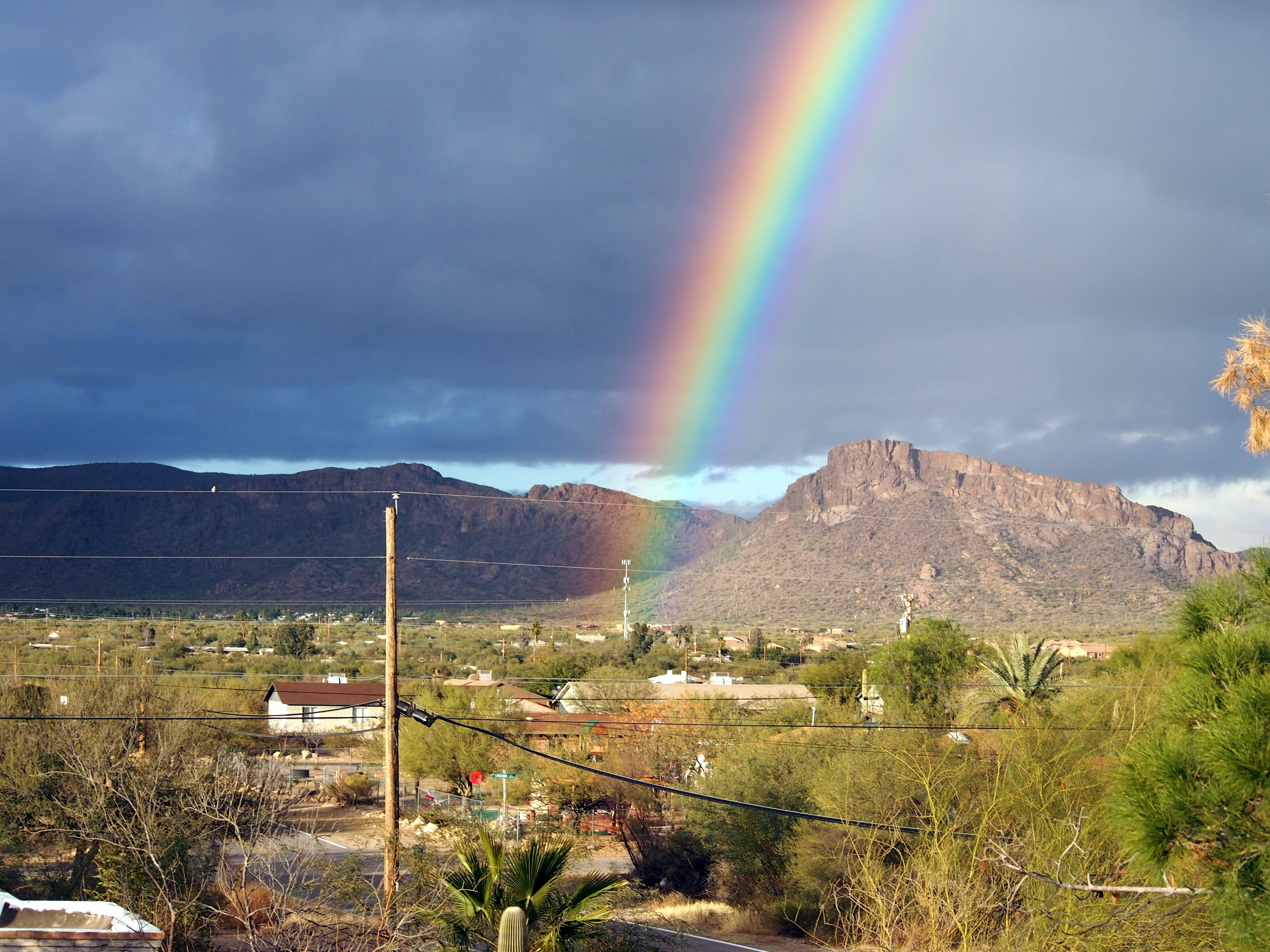
- A rainbow appearing after a monsoon in Drexel Heights, Arizona, USA.

- Location in Pima County and the state of Arizona

- Location in the United States
- Coordinates: 32.142914°N 111.026536°W
- Country: United States
- State: Arizona
- County: Pima

Area
  - Total: 19.25 sq mi (49.85 km^{2})
  - Land: 19.25 sq mi (49.85 km^{2})
  - Water: 0 sq mi (0.00 km^{2})
- Elevation: 2,530 ft (770 m)

Population (2020)
  - Total: 27,523
  - Density: 1,430.0/sq mi (552.13/km^{2})
- Time zone: UTC-7 (MST (no DST))
- FIPS code: 04-20540
- GNIS feature ID: 0025237

Drexel Heights is an unincorporated community and census-designated place (CDP) in Pima County, Arizona, United States. The population was 27,523 at the 2020 census, down from 27,749 at the 2010 census.

The area is said to be named after financier Francis Anthony Drexel, the father of Saint Katharine Drexel (who established missions to Blacks and Native Americans throughout the United States). Drexel is said to have owned property in the Drexel Heights area and eastward during the late 19th century, although no proof has ever been found that he owned land in the area. Francis A. Drexel died in 1885.

Drexel Road was likely named after Saint Katharine Drexel. However, her father Francis A. Drexel didn't own land in the area as has been claimed in the past.

== Geography ==
Drexel Heights is located at 32°8′20″N 111°2′38″W (32.138989, -111.043926).

According to the United States Census Bureau, the CDP has a total area of 19.7 square miles (51 km^{2}), all land.

The area has numerous Saguaro cacti, and is positioned only a couple of miles south of the Saguaro National Park. The northern boundary of Drexel Heights is the Tucson Mountain Park. It is cut off from the rest of Tucson due to the topography of the Tucson Mountains, which are only crossed via a small number of roads: Ajo Highway is the main crossing, with Gates Pass providing a more scenic route. Coyotes and Javalinas are commonly sighted in the area.

== Demographics ==
Historical population
| Census | Pop. | Note | %± |
|---|---|---|---|
| 2000 | 23,849 | | — |
| 2010 | 27,749 | | 16.4% |
| 2020 | 27,523 | | −0.8% |
U.S. Decennial Census

=== 2020 census ===
As of the 2020 census, Drexel Heights had a population of 27,523. The median age was 38.5 years. 24.1% of residents were under the age of 18 and 17.3% of residents were 65 years of age or older. For every 100 females there were 98.6 males, and for every 100 females age 18 and over there were 96.7 males age 18 and over.

98.9% of residents lived in urban areas, while 1.1% lived in rural areas.

There were 9,255 households in Drexel Heights, of which 34.5% had children under the age of 18 living in them. Of all households, 47.8% were married-couple households, 20.4% were households with a male householder and no spouse or partner present, and 24.4% were households with a female householder and no spouse or partner present. About 20.9% of all households were made up of individuals and 10.0% had someone living alone who was 65 years of age or older.

There were 9,785 housing units, of which 5.4% were vacant. The homeowner vacancy rate was 0.8% and the rental vacancy rate was 4.9%.

Racial composition as of the 2020 census
| Race | Number | Percent |
|---|---|---|
| White | 9,912 | 36.0% |
| Black or African American | 545 | 2.0% |
| American Indian and Alaska Native | 1,520 | 5.5% |
| Asian | 244 | 0.9% |
| Native Hawaiian and Other Pacific Islander | 25 | 0.1% |
| Some other race | 7,762 | 28.2% |
| Two or more races | 7,515 | 27.3% |
| Hispanic or Latino (of any race) | 20,067 | 72.9% |

=== 2010 census ===
As of the census of 2010, the racial makeup of the CDP was 58.6% White, 2.5% Black or African American, 2.3% Native American, 0.7% Asian, 0.1% Pacific Islander, 28.5% from other races, and 4.3% from two or more races. 70.6% of the population were Hispanic or Latino of any race. There were 8,824 households, out of which 57.2% had children under the age of 18 living with them, 59.8% were married couples living together, 17.2% had a female householder with no husband present, and 23.0% were non-families. 17.2% of all households were made up of individuals, and 2.4% had someone living alone who was 65 years of age or older. The average household size was 3.14 and the average family size was 3.54.

=== 2000 census ===
As of the census of 2000, there were 23,849 people, 7,505 households, and 5,988 families residing in the CDP. The population density was 1,212.1 inhabitants per square mile (468.0/km^{2}). There were 7,957 housing units at an average density of 404.4 per square mile (156.1/km^{2}). The racial makeup of the CDP was 58.1% White, 2.6% Black or African American, 3.4% Native American, 0.8% Asian, 0.1% Pacific Islander, 31.3% from other races, and 3.6% from two or more races. 60.1% of the population were Hispanic or Latino of any race.

In the CDP, the population was spread out, with 31.9% under the age of 18, 9.4% from 18 to 24, 28.6% from 25 to 44, 22.0% from 45 to 64, and 8.1% who were 65 years of age or older. The median age was 32 years. For every 100 females, there were 97.1 males. For every 100 females age 18 and over, there were 92.1 males.

== Ecology ==
Drexel Heights enjoys abundant urban wildlife but not everyone enjoys it. The Fire Department has decided to release captured nuisance wildlife near town to avoid excessive ecological disruption, but this has increased the number of animals returning to the originally reported location.

== Education ==
It is in the Tucson Unified School District.
