= Jennifer J. Stewart =

American children's writer

- Born: East Patchogue, New York City
- Occupation: Writer
- Known for: If That Breathes Fire, We're Toast!

Jennifer J. Stewart is an American children's writer. She writes humorous books for young children and middle grade (upper elementary school) readers. She also writes educational nonfiction for children under the pen name J.J. Stewart.

She was born in East Patchogue, New York, to a librarian mother and a physicist father. When she was four years old, her family moved to Tucson, Arizona, where she grew up and attended Whitmore Elementary, Townsend Junior High, and Catalina High. She received an honors degree in English from Wellesley College, followed by an M.B.A. from the University of Utah.

== Published books ==
Her books include:

- If That Breathes Fire, We're Toast!
- The Bean King's Daughter
- Close Encounters of a Third-World Kind
- The Twelve Days of Christmas in Arizona
- The Girl Who Has Everything
- Justin Trudeau (as J. J. Stewart)
- Grand Canyon National Park (as J. J. Stewart)

== Awards ==
Her first novel, If That Breathes Fire, We’re Toast! was named to VOYA's Best Fantasy list and the Oklahoma Sequoyah Book Award master list.

Her third novel, Close Encounters of a Third-World Kind, is loosely based upon her family's real life adventures working as medical volunteers in the Kingdom of Nepal.

Her picture book, The Twelve Days of Christmas in Arizona, illustrated by Lynne Avril, was a finalist for the 2011 Crystal Kite award, given by the Society of Children's Book Writers and Illustrators, and received the Glyph Award, given by the Arizona Book Publishing Association, also in 2011.
