= University High School (Tucson) =

Location
- 421 N. Arcadia Ave. Tucson, Arizona; United States; 32°13′35″N 110°53′20″W

Information
- Type: Magnet School
- Established: 1976
- Oversight: Tucson Unified School District
- CEEB code: 030488
- Principal: Alberto Ranjel
- Grades: 9-12
- Enrollment: 1,001 (2025-26)
- Campus type: Urban
- Colors: Black and white
- Mascot: Penguin
- Newspaper: The Perspective
- Website: uhs.tusd1.org

University High School (UHS) is an accelerated public high school located in Tucson, Arizona. Originally known as Special Projects High School (SPHS), University High School is in the Tucson Unified School District (TUSD). The mission statement of UHS identifies it as "a special function high school which serves students who are academically focused and intellectually gifted and provides curriculum and social support not offered in the comprehensive high school." Since 1985, it has shared a campus with Rincon High School, a separate high school. Courses from each school can be combined, and athletics and fine arts are combined under the Rincon/University (RUHS) name.

== Location and features ==
The school currently shares a centrally located campus with Rincon High School. University High students and Rincon students share fine arts and athletics, competing under the name of Rincon University. However, the two are different high schools, with separate academic programs.

== History ==
Special Projects High School was inaugurated in 1976–77 on the campus of Tucson High Magnet School. The goal was to provide advanced courses for the district's students and explore interest in a variety of careers. The program also was a cost-saver by acting as the only place to take Advanced Placement classes rather than at each campus. Admission at this time required an I.Q. of 130 or higher.

In 1977-78, University High School began hosting annual senior debates featuring student-led political parties with policy proposals. To this day, these debates remain a School tradition that fosters dedication, critical thinking, and leadership skills.

In 1982, the TUSD governing board renamed Special Projects High School to its current name University High School. The name represents the AP classes offered at the school.

Around this time, parents complained about the discrimination of the school's enrollment of less than 12 percent minority students. Additionally, Tucson High parents were displeased by the quality of classes and equipment compared to those at University High, despite the two groups of students sharing a campus. Over the next year, discussion brewed on whether to move the UHS campus to Roskruge K-8 or Rincon High School, eventually moving to Rincon in 1984.

In October 2017, the TUSD Governing Board considered giving University High School its own campus. The plan would include transferring the students at the under-enrolled Catalina High School to Rincon and moving University High into the campus to satisfy overcrowding at RUHS. Added to the plan would be opening a direct feeder middle school close to the new campus. However, by the end of that year the plan was placed on pause.

== Ranking and recognition ==
U.S. News & World Report has included UHS in their list of "America's Best High Schools" out of nearly 18,000 schools in the US:

| Year | Rank |
|---|---|
| 2025 | Ranked #92 |
| 2024 | Ranked #81 |
| 2023 | Ranked #25 |
| 2022 | Ranked #28 |
| 2021 | Ranked #17 |
| 2020 | Ranked #22 |
| 2019 | Ranked #40 |
| 2018 | Ranked #27 |
| 2017 | Ranked #15 |
| 2016 | Ranked #24 |
| 2015 | Ranked #8 |
| 2014 | Ranked #7 |
| 2013 | Ranked #28 |
| 2012 | Ranked #4 |

In 2014, the Washington Post listed UHS at No. 28 in its review of "America's Most Challenging High Schools," which ranked the 1,900 highest-performing high schools nationally.

In 2013, the Daily Beast listed UHS at No. 19 in its annual list of the "Best 2,000 High Schools in the Nation.

In May 2006, Newsweek named UHS as one of "The Public Elites," schools that, "NEWSWEEK excluded...from the list of Best High Schools because so many of their students score well above average on the SAT and ACT."

In 2005 and 2016, it was honored as a Blue Ribbon school.

== Notable alumni ==
- Cisco Aguilar, Nevada Secretary of State.
- Max Cannon, creator of Red Meat comic strip
- Gabby Giffords, U.S. Representative from Arizona's 8th district
- Martha Crawford Heitzmann, vice president for research and development, Air Liquide, France
- Kaiser Kuo, writer, musician, podcaster, and director of International Communications at Baidu
- Clare McNulty, actress
- Timothy Reckart, Academy Award-nominated filmmaker
- Zach Selwyn, actor, TV host, musician and writer Guinness World Records Gone Wild
- Michael Thompson, professional golfer
- Jessica Grace Wing, composer and filmmaker
- Deja Foxx, reproductive rights activist and political strategist
