= Jimmy Johnson (baseball, born 1947) =

American baseball player and manager

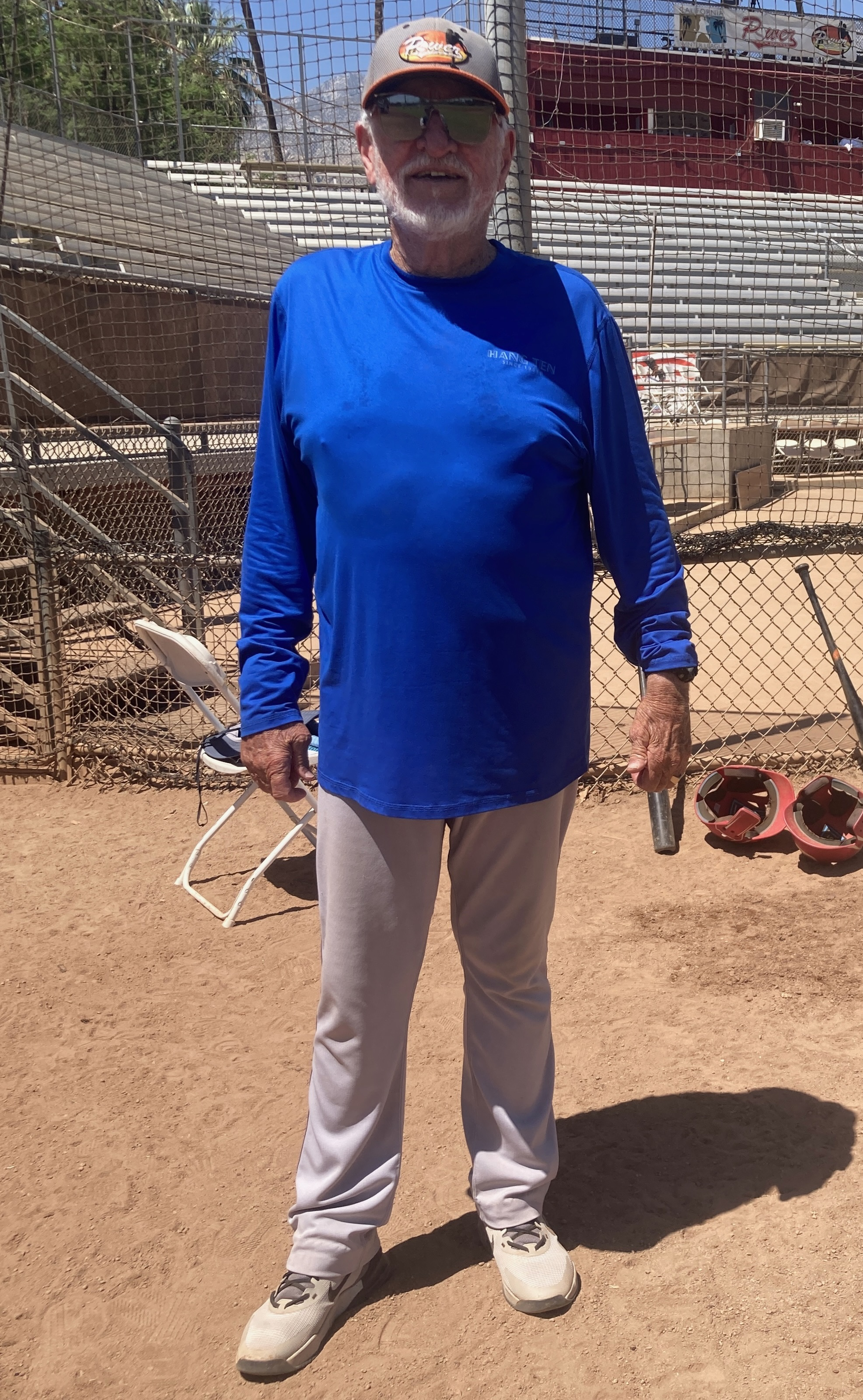
- Johnson in 2026 managing the PSCL's Blue Sox
- Infielder / Manager
- Born: August 28, 1947 (age 79); Colona, Illinois, U.S.
- Bats: Right Throws: Right
- Stats at Baseball Reference

James Lloyd Johnson (born August 28, 1947) is an American professional baseball coach, and a former infielder and manager at the minor league level. Johnson was primarily a shortstop and third baseman during his playing days. He threw and batted right-handed, stood 6 feet (1.83 m) tall and weighed 170 pounds (77 kg). As a player, Johnson compiled a .252 batting average in 577 minor league games.

== Early life ==
Johnson was born at Colona, Illinois. He graduated from Rincon High School in Tucson, Arizona, and attended the University of New Mexico.

== Career ==
He signed his first pro contract with the Houston Astros and spent a quarter-century in their system as an infielder (1969–76), minor league manager (1977–82; 1984–85) (including the Columbus Astros (1978-1979, 1984) and Tucson Toros (1980–82, 1985)) and coordinator of instruction (1983; 1986–93). He then joined the New York Yankees as an instructor and manager, and later worked with the Los Angeles Dodgers and Colorado Rockies as a minor league hitting coordinator. He has also managed additional minor league teams, including the Norwich Navigators in 1995, Greensboro Bats in 1996 and the St. Paul Saints in 2002. He was listed as the Colorado farm system's roving batting instructor in 2009. He also coached for the China national baseball team at the 2017 World Baseball Classic. Johnson served as the manager of the Grand Junction Rockies of the Pioneer League for the 2021 season. He coached at The California Winter League, as well as The Palm Springs College League.
