= Jessica Grace Wing =

American composer (1971–2003)

- Born: July 24, 1971; New Haven, Connecticut, U.S.
- Died: July 19, 2003 (aged 32) New York City, U.S.
- Occupation: Theatrical composer

Jessica Grace Wing (July 24, 1971 – July 19, 2003) was an American theatrical composer active in New York City. She was resident composer of the off-Broadway Inverse Theater Company and wrote one full-length musical, Lost.

Wing was born in New Haven, Connecticut and grew up in Tucson, Arizona, where she attended University High School. She attended college at Stanford University. In 1997 she moved to New York City, where she co-founded the Inverse Theater Company. Her musical accompaniments incorporated a diverse range from bluegrass to opera.

Wing served as assistant sound designer on the Todd Solondz film Happiness and wrote and directed a number of short films in pursuing an MFA in film at Columbia University. Wing was a member of San Francisco-based improvisational ambient electronica band Weird Blinking Lights, providing compositional, vocal, synthesizer, and effects performance, and released several solo electronica compilations under the moniker Warm Blooded Love.

== Works ==
=== Music and songs for theater ===
- Othello (1998)
- The Death of Griffin Hunter (1998)
- Twelfth Night (1999)
- Midnight Brainwash Revival (1999)
- The Death of Don Flagrante Delicto (2000)
- The Burnt Woman of Harvard (2001)

=== Full-length musical ===
- Lost (2003)
