= Rincon High School =

Public school in Tucson, Arizona

Location
- 421 N. Arcadia Avenue; Tucson, Arizona 85711; United States; 32°13′37″N 110°53′17″W

Information
- Type: Public
- Established: September 12, 1958 (68 years ago)
- School district: Tucson Unified School District
- CEEB code: 030502
- Principal: Alissa Welch
- Teaching staff: 67.73 (on FTE basis)
- Grades: 9 to 12
- Enrollment: 1,217 (2023-2024)
- Student to teacher ratio: 17.97
- Colors: Purple and white
- Nickname: Home of the Rangers
- Team name: Rincon Rangers
- Newspaper: The Rincon Echo
- Website: rinconhs.tusd1.org

Rincon High School is a public high school in Tucson, Arizona, United States. The school serves about 1,100 students in grades 9 to 12 in the Tucson Unified School District (TUSD). Since 1985, the campus has been shared with University High School, a separate accelerated institution. Courses from each school can be combined, and athletics and fine arts are combined under the Rincon/University(RUHS) name. The two schools do field separate teams for academic competitive events. It opened its doors in 1958.

== Notable alumni ==
- Ron Barber, U.S. Representative for Arizona (2012 to 2015)
- Chad Griggs, professional mixed martial arts fighter
- Jason Jacome, Former MLB player (New York Mets, Kansas City Royals, Cleveland Indians)
- Jimmy Johnson, former minor league infielder and manager
- Paul Moskau, Former MLB player (Cincinnati Reds, Pittsburgh Pirates, Chicago Cubs)
- Tom Pagnozzi, Former MLB player (St. Louis Cardinals)
- Dan Schneider, Major League Baseball pitcher.
- Nora Slawik, Minnesota politician
- Janet Varney, actress
- Kate Walsh, actress
