= Pueblo High School (Tucson) =

Public school in Arizona

Coordinates: 32°11′03″N 110°58′51″W

Location
- 3500 South 12th Avenue; Tucson, Arizona; United States

Information
- Type: Public secondary (U.S.)
- Motto: ¡Sí Se Puede!, Yes, it can be done!
- Established: April 2, 1956 (70 years ago)
- Oversight: Tucson Unified School District
- CEEB code: 030500
- Principal: Frank Rosthenhausler
- Staff: 104.20 (FTE)
- Grades: 9–12
- Enrollment: 1,806 (2023-2024)
- Student to teacher ratio: 17.33
- Campus type: Urban
- Colors: Navy and Columbia blue
- Mascot: Warriors
- Newspaper: El Guerrero
- Yearbook: El Dorado
- Website: pueblohs.tusd1.org

Pueblo High School is a high school in Tucson, Arizona. Opened in 1956, it is a school in the Tucson Unified School District.

== Notable alumni ==
- Adelita Grijalva, U.S. representative for Arizona's 7th congressional district
- Victor Soltero, Arizona State Senator for District 29
- Richard A. Carranza, educator
- Luis Coronel, American Regional Mexican singer
- George Arias, former MLB player (Anaheim Angels, San Diego Padres)
- Fat Lever, former NBA player (Portland Trail Blazers, Denver Nuggets, Dallas Mavericks)
- Leonard Thompson, former NFL player (Detroit Lions)
- Francisco Romero, Major League Baseball Spanish broadcaster for the Houston Astros and University of Arizona
- Robert Ravago, former pitcher for the Miami Marlins organization
- María Urquides (teacher/counselor), national bilingual education leader, "Mother of Bilingual Education"
- Robert John Bardo, convicted murderer of actress Rebecca Schaeffer (dropped out)
