= Death of Elaine Herzberg =

First pedestrian fatality caused by self-driving car

Elaine Herzberg
- Born: Elaine Marie Wood; August 2, 1968; Phoenix, Arizona, U.S.
- Died: March 18, 2018 (aged 49); Tempe, Arizona, U.S.
- Cause of death: Hit by a self-driving car
- Burial place: Phoenix, Arizona
- Education: Apache Junction High School, Apache Junction, Arizona
- Spouse(s): Mike Herzberg (until his death); Rolf Erich Ziemann (until Elaine's death)

The death of Elaine Herzberg (August 2, 1968 – March 18, 2018) was the first recorded case of a pedestrian fatality involving a self-driving car, after a collision that occurred late in the evening of March 18, 2018. Herzberg was pushing a bicycle across a four-lane road in Tempe, Arizona, United States, when she was struck by an Uber test vehicle, which was operating in self-drive mode with a human safety backup driver sitting in the driving seat. Herzberg was taken to the local hospital where she died of her injuries.

Following the fatal incident, the National Transportation Safety Board (NTSB) issued a series of recommendations and sharply criticized Uber. The company suspended testing of self-driving vehicles in Arizona, where such testing had been approved since August 2016. Uber chose not to renew its permit for testing self-driving vehicles in California when it expired at the end of March 2018. Uber resumed testing in December 2018, starting in Pittsburgh, Pennsylvania.

In March 2019, Arizona prosecutors ruled that Uber was not criminally responsible for the crash. The back-up driver of the vehicle was charged with negligent homicide, pled guilty to endangerment, and was sentenced to three years' probation.

While Herzberg was the first pedestrian killed by a self-driving car, driver Gao Yaning died in a Tesla semi-autonomous car two years earlier. A reporter for The Washington Post compared Herzberg's fate with that of Bridget Driscoll who, in the United Kingdom in 1896, was the first pedestrian to be killed by an automobile.

The Arizona incident has magnified the importance of collision avoidance systems for self-driving vehicles.

== Collision summary ==
Herzberg was crossing Mill Avenue (North) from west to east, approximately 360 feet (110 m) south of the intersection with Curry Road, outside the designated pedestrian crosswalk, close to the Red Mountain Freeway. She was pushing a bicycle laden with shopping bags, and had crossed at least two lanes of traffic when she was struck at approximately 9:58 pm MST (UTC−07:00) by a prototype Uber self-driving car based on a Volvo XC90, which was traveling north on Mill. The vehicle had been operating in autonomous mode since 9:39 pm, nineteen minutes before it struck and killed Herzberg. The car's human safety backup driver, Rafaela Vasquez, did not intervene in time to prevent the collision. Vehicle telemetry obtained after the crash showed that the human operator responded by moving the steering wheel less than a second before impact, and she engaged the brakes less than a second after impact.

== Cause investigation ==
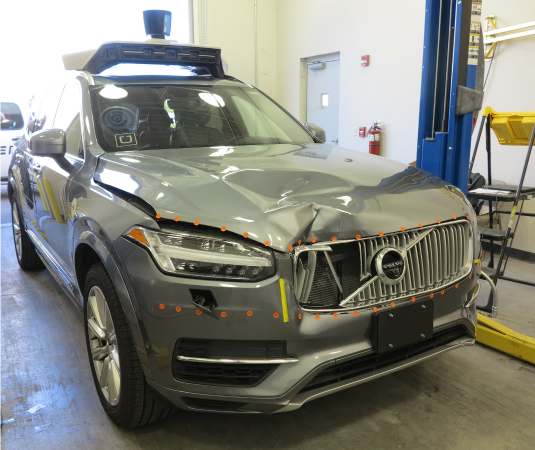
The self-driving Uber Volvo XC90 involved in the collision, with damage on the right front side

The county district attorney's office recused itself from the investigation, due to a prior joint partnership with Uber promoting their services as an alternative to driving under the influence of alcohol.

Accounts differ on the speed limit at the place of the incident. According to Tempe police the car was traveling in a 35 mph (56 km/h) zone, but this is contradicted by a posted speed limit of 45 mph (72 km/h).

The National Transportation Safety Board (NTSB) sent a team of federal investigators to gather data from vehicle instruments, and to examine vehicle condition along with the actions taken by the safety driver. Their preliminary findings were substantiated by multiple event data recorders and proved the vehicle was traveling 43 miles per hour (69 km/h) when Herzberg was first detected 6 seconds (378 feet (115 m)) before impact; during 4.7 seconds the self driving system did not infer that emergency braking was needed. A vehicle traveling 43 mph (69 km/h) can generally stop within 89 feet (27 m) once the brakes are applied. The machine needed to be 1.3 seconds (82 feet (25 m)) away prior to discerning that emergency braking was required, whereas at least that much distance was required to stop. The system failed to behave properly. A total stopping distance of 76 feet itself would imply a safe speed under 25 mph (40 km/h). Human intervention was still legally required. Computer perception–reaction time would have been a speed limiting factor had the technology been superior to humans in ambiguous situations; however, the nascent computerized braking technology was disabled the day of the crash, and the machine's apparent 4.7-second perception–reaction (alarm) time allowed the car to travel 250 feet (76 m). Video released by the police on March 21 showed the safety driver was not watching the road moments before the vehicle struck Herzberg.

=== Environment ===
Vicinity of Mill Avenue (running north–south) and Curry/Washington (east–west) in Tempe, Arizona

In widely disseminated remarks that would shape the narrative about the crash, which were later seen as prejudicial and subsequently contradicted by her own department, Tempe Police Chief Sylvia Moir was quoted stating that the collision was "unavoidable" based on the initial police investigation, which included a review of the video captured by an onboard camera. Moir faulted Herzberg for crossing the road in an unsafe manner: "It is dangerous to cross roadways in the evening hour when well-illuminated, managed crosswalks are available." According to Uber, safety drivers were trained to keep their hands very close to the wheel all the time while driving the vehicle so they were ready to quickly take control if necessary.

The driver said it was like a flash, the person walked out in front of them. His [sic] first alert to the collision was the sound of the collision. [...] it's very clear it would have been difficult to avoid this collision in any kind of mode (autonomous or human-driven) based on how she came from the shadows right into the roadway.

— Chief Sylvia Moir, Tempe Police, San Francisco Chronicle interview, March 19, 2018

Aerial photographs of Mill Avenue

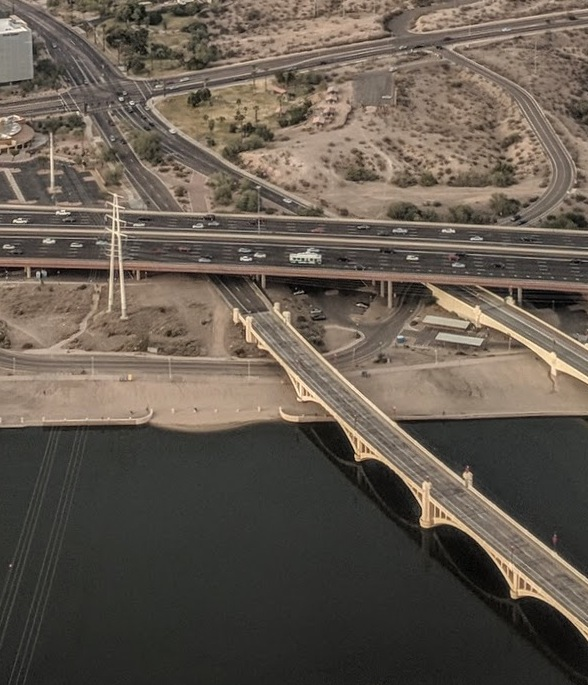
Facing north; Mill Avenue runs from the top left corner to the bottom right corner (north–south).

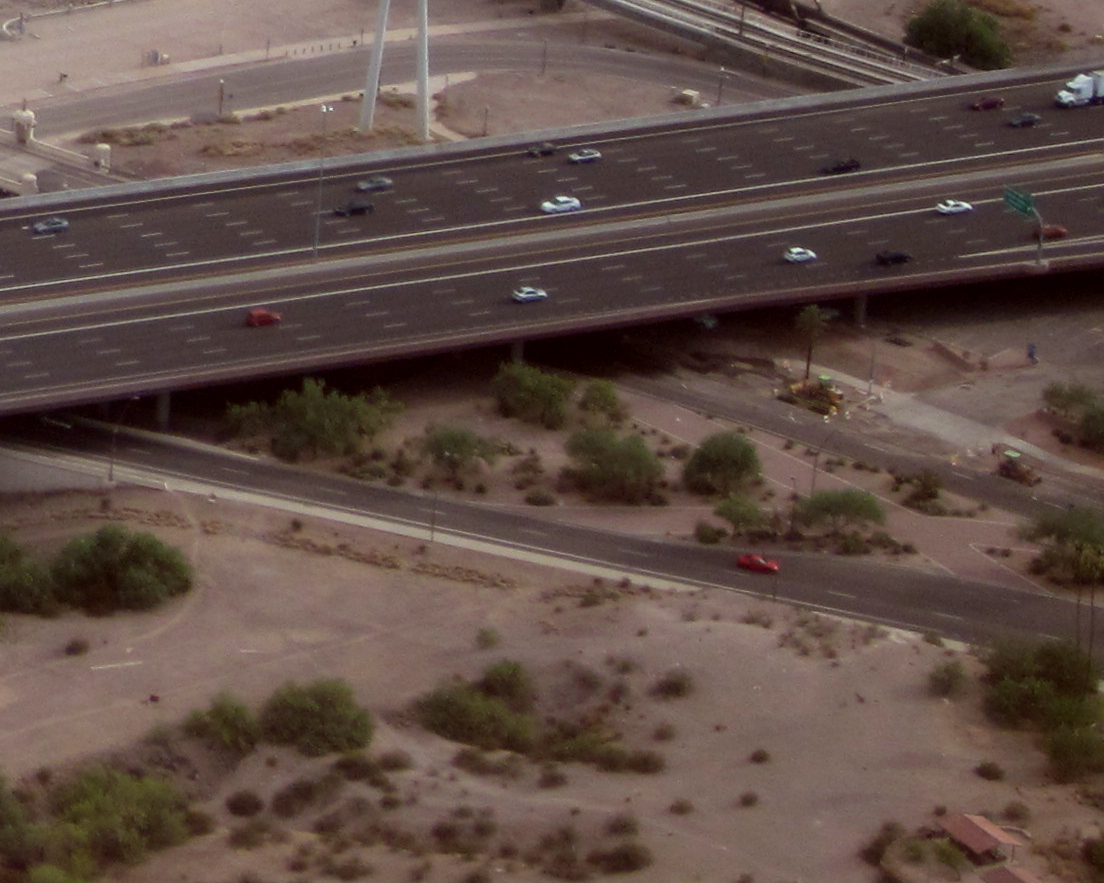
Facing southwest; ornamental brick-lined median dividing Mill Avenue

Tempe police released video on March 21, 2018, showing footage recorded by two onboard cameras: one forward-looking, and one capturing the safety driver's actions. The forward-facing video shows that the self-driving car was traveling in the far right lane when it struck Herzberg. The driver-facing video shows the safety driver was looking down prior to the collision. The Uber operator is responsible for intervening and taking manual control when necessary as well as for monitoring diagnostic messages, which are displayed on a screen in the center console. In an interview conducted after the crash with NTSB, the driver stated she was monitoring the center stack at the time of the collision.

After the Uber video was released, journalist Carolyn Said noted the police explanation of Herzberg's path meant she had already crossed two lanes of traffic before she was struck by the autonomous vehicle. The Marquee Theatre and Tempe Town Lake are west of Mill Avenue, and pedestrians commonly cross mid-street without detouring north to the crosswalk at Curry. According to reporting by the Phoenix New Times, Mill Avenue contains what appears to be a brick-paved path in the median between the northbound and southbound lanes; however, posted signs prohibit pedestrians from crossing in that location. When the second of the Mill Avenue bridges over the town lake was added in 1994 for northbound traffic, the X-shaped crossover in the median was installed to accommodate the potential closing of one of the two road bridges. The purpose of this brick-paved structure is purely to divert cars from one side to the other if a bridge is closed to traffic, and although it may look like a crosswalk for pedestrians, it is in fact a temporary roadway with vertical curbs and warning signs.

=== Software issues ===
Michael Ramsey, a self-driving car expert with Gartner, characterized the video as showing "a complete failure of the system to recognize an obviously seen person who is visible for quite some distance in the frame. Uber has some serious explaining to do about why this person wasn't seen and why the system didn't engage."

The NTSB preliminary report, however, noted that the software did order the car to brake 1.3 seconds before the collision.

A video shot from the vehicle's dashboard camera showed the safety driver looking down, away from the road. It also appeared that the driver's hands were not hovering above the steering wheel, which is what drivers are instructed to do so they can quickly retake control of the car. Uber had moved from two employees in every car to one. The paired employees had been splitting duties: one ready to take over if the autonomous system failed, and another to keep an eye on what the computers were detecting. The second person was responsible for keeping track of system performance as well as labeling data on a laptop computer. Mr. Kallman, the Uber spokesman, said the second person was in the car for purely data related tasks, not safety. When Uber moved to a single operator, some employees expressed safety concerns to managers, according to the two people familiar with Uber's operations. They were worried that going solo would make it harder to remain alert during hours of monotonous driving.

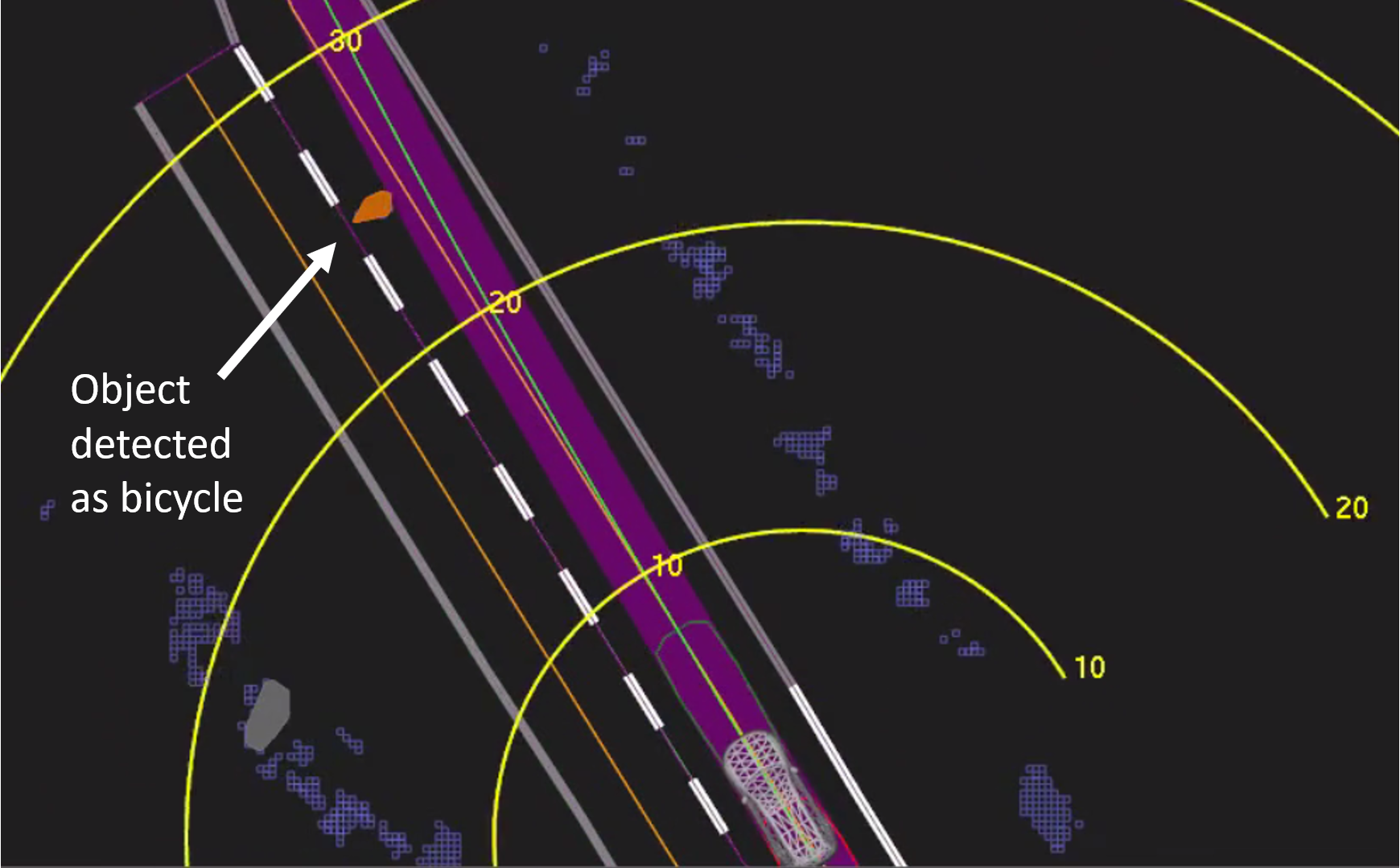
Playback of self-driving system data at 1.3 seconds before impact. Distances shown in meters.

The recorded telemetry showed the system had detected Herzberg six seconds before the crash, and classified her first as an unknown object, then as a vehicle, and finally as a bicycle, each of which had a different predicted path according to the autonomy logic. 1.3 seconds prior to the impact, the system determined that emergency braking was required, which is normally performed by the vehicle operator. However, the system was not designed to alert the operator, and did not make an emergency stop on its own accord, as "emergency braking maneuvers are not enabled while the vehicle is under computer control, to reduce the potential for erratic vehicle behavior", according to NTSB.

=== Sensor issues ===
Brad Templeton, who provided consulting for autonomous driving competitor Waymo, noted the car was equipped with advanced sensors, including radar and LiDAR, which would not have been affected by the darkness. Templeton stated "I know the [sensor] technology is better than that, so I do feel that it must be Uber's failure." Arrowood also recognized potential sensor issues: "Really what we are going to ask is, at what point should or could those sensors recognize the movement off to the left. Presumably she was somewhere in the darkness."

In a press event conducted by Uber in Tempe in 2017, safety drivers touted the sensor technology, saying they were effective at anticipating jaywalkers, especially in the darkness, stopping the autonomous vehicles before the safety driver can even see pedestrians. However, manual intervention by the safety drivers was required to avoid a collision with another vehicle on at least one instance with a reporter from The Arizona Republic riding along.

Uber announced they would replace their Ford Fusion-based self-driving fleet with cars based on the Volvo XC90 in August 2016; the XC90s sold to Uber would be prepared to receive Uber's vehicle control hardware and software, but would not include any of Volvo's own advanced driver-assistance systems. Uber characterized the sensor suite attached to the Fusion as the "desktop" model, and the one attached to the XC90 as the "laptop", hoping to develop the "smartphone" soon. According to Uber, the suite for the XC90 was developed in approximately four months. The XC90 as modified by Uber included a single roof-mounted LiDAR sensor and 10 radar sensors, providing 360° coverage around the vehicle. In comparison, the Fusion had seven LiDAR sensors (including one mounted on the roof) and seven radar sensors. According to Velodyne, the supplier of Uber's LiDAR, the single roof-mounted LiDAR sensor has a narrow vertical range that prevents it from detecting obstacles low to the ground, creating a blind spot around the vehicle. Marta Hall, the president of Velodyne commented "If you're going to avoid pedestrians, you're going to need to have a side lidar to see those pedestrians and avoid them, especially at night." However, the augmented radar sensor suite would be able to detect obstacles in the LiDAR blind spot.

=== Distraction ===
On Thursday, June 21, the Tempe Police Department released a detailed report along with media captured after the collision, including an audio recording of the 911 call made by the safety driver, Rafaela Vasquez, and an initial on-scene interview with a responding officer, captured by body worn video. After the crash, police obtained search warrants for Vasquez's cellphones as well as records from the video streaming services Netflix, YouTube, and Hulu. The investigation concluded that because the data showed she was streaming The Voice over Hulu at the time of the collision, and the driver-facing camera in the Volvo showed "her face appears to react and show a smirk or laugh at various points during the time she is looking down", Vasquez may have been distracted from her primary job of monitoring road and vehicle conditions. Tempe police concluded the crash was "entirely avoidable" and faulted Vasquez for her "disregard for assigned job function to intervene in a hazardous situation".

Records indicate that streaming began at 9:16 pm and ended at 9:59 pm. Based on an examination of the video captured by the driver-facing camera, Vasquez was looking down toward her right knee 166 times for a total of 6 minutes, 47 seconds during the 21 minutes, 48 seconds preceding the crash. Just prior to the crash, Vasquez was looking at her lap for 5.3 seconds; she looked up half a second before the impact. Vasquez stated in her post-crash interview with the NTSB that she had been monitoring system messages on the center console, and that she did not use either one of her cell phones until she called 911. According to an unnamed Uber source, safety drivers are not responsible for monitoring diagnostic messages. Vasquez also told responding police officers she kept her hands near the steering wheel in preparation to take control if required, which contradicted the driver-facing video, which did not show her hands near the wheel. Police concluded that given the same conditions, Herzberg would have been visible to 85% of motorists at a distance of 143 feet (44 m), 5.7 seconds before the car struck Herzberg. According to the police report, Vasquez should have been able to apply the brakes at least 0.57 seconds sooner, which would have provided Herzberg sufficient time to pass safely in front of the car.

The police report was turned over to the Yavapai County Attorney's Office for review of possible manslaughter charges. The Maricopa County Attorney's Office recused itself from prosecution over a potential conflict of interest, as it had earlier participated with Uber in a March 2016 campaign against drunk driving. On March 4, 2019, Yavapai County Attorney released a letter indicating there is "no basis for criminal liability" against Uber Corporation; that potential charges against the driver should be further investigated by Maricopa County Attorney; and that the Tempe Police Department should analyze the case to gather additional evidence.

=== Other factors ===
According to the preliminary report of the collision released by the NTSB, Herzberg had tested positive for methamphetamine and marijuana in a toxicology test carried out after the collision. Residual toxicology itself does not establish if or when she was under their influence, and hence an actual factor. Inhibited faculties can hypothetically factor into one's relative ability for last-minute self-preservation. However, her mere presence on the roadway far in the distance ahead of the car was the factor which invoked the machine's duty to brake; the common legal duty to avoid her and other objects being general and preexisting.

On May 24, NTSB released a preliminary incident report, the news release saying that Herzberg "was dressed in dark clothing, did not look in the direction of the vehicle... crossed... in a section not directly illuminated by lighting... entered the roadway from a brick median, where signs...warn pedestrians to use a crosswalk... 360 feet north." Six seconds before impact, the vehicle was traveling 43 mph (69 km/h), and the system identified the woman and bicycle as an unknown object, next as a vehicle, then as a bicycle. At 1.3 seconds before hitting the pedestrian and her bike, the system flagged the need for emergency braking, but it failed to do so, as the car hit Herzberg at 39 mph (63 km/h).

The forward-looking Uber dashcam did not pick up Herzberg until approximately 1.4 seconds before the collision, suggesting (as the sheriff did) that the crash may have been completely unavoidable even if Vasquez hadn't been distracted in the seconds leading up to the crash.

However, night-time video shot by other motorists in the days following the crash, plus their comments, suggest that the area may have been better illuminated than the dashcam footage, viewed in isolation, would suggest. This raises the possibility that Herzberg's appearing so late in the Uber video could merely be an indication that the camera had insufficient sensitivity or was otherwise poorly calibrated for the environment and setting in which it was operating. If these crowd-sourced re-creations are indeed representative of the visibility conditions on the actual night that the crash occurred, then Herzberg would have been visible to Vasquez as soon as there was a clear sight line had Vasquez only been looking ahead, refuting the assertion that the crash was unavoidable.

== Coordination with state government ==
Prior to the fatal incident, Arizona Governor Doug Ducey had encouraged Uber to enter the state. He signed Executive Order 2015-09 on August 25, 2015, entitled "Self-Driving Vehicle Testing and Piloting in the State of Arizona; Self-Driving Vehicle Oversight Committee", establishing a welcoming attitude to autonomous vehicle testing and an oversight committee for self-driving vehicles. According to Ducey's office, the committee, which consists of eight state employees appointed by the governor, has met twice since it was formed.

In December 2016, Ducey had released a statement welcoming Uber's autonomous cars: "Arizona welcomes Uber self-driving cars with open arms and wide open roads. While California puts the brakes on innovation and change with more bureaucracy and more regulation, Arizona is paving the way for new technology and new businesses." Emails between Uber and the office of the governor showed that Ducey was informed that the testing of self-driving vehicles would begin in August 2016, several months ahead of the official announcement welcoming Uber in December. On March 1, 2018, Ducey signed Executive Order (XO) 2018-04, outlining regulations for autonomous vehicles. Notably, XO 2018-04 requires the company testing self-driving cars to provide a written statement that "the fully autonomous vehicle will achieve a minimal risk condition" if a failure occurs.

== Aftermath ==
=== Uber ===
After the collision that killed Herzberg on March 18, 2018, Uber ceased testing self-driving vehicles in all four cities (Tempe, San Francisco, Pittsburgh, and Toronto) where it had deployed them. On March 26, Governor Ducey sent a letter to Uber CEO Dara Khosrowshahi, suspending Uber's testing of self-driving cars in the state. In the letter, Ducey stated "As governor, my top priority is public safety. Improving public safety has always been the emphasis of Arizona's approach to autonomous vehicle testing, and my expectation is that public safety is also the top priority for all who operate this technology in the state of Arizona." Uber also announced it would not renew its permit to test self-driving cars in California after the California Department of Motor Vehicles wrote to inform Uber that its permit would expire on March 31, and "any follow-up analysis or investigations from the recent crash in Arizona" would have to be addressed before the permit could be renewed. Uber acknowledged that mistakes were made in its pursuit to ultimately create a safer driving environment.

Later in the year, Uber issued a reflective 70-page safety report in which Uber stated the potential for its self-driving cars to be safer than those driven by humans. However, some of their employees worry that Uber is taking shortcuts to hit internal milestones. To be legal in all states for private use, or anywhere at the commercial level, the technology must hard code assured clear distance ahead driving.

Uber returned their self-driving cars to the roads in public testing in Pittsburgh, Pennsylvania, on December 20, 2018. Uber said they received authorization from the Pennsylvania Department of Transportation. Uber said they were also pursuing the same with cars on roads in San Francisco, California, and Toronto, Ontario. In December 2020, Uber sold its Advanced Technologies Group, which was researching automated driving systems, to Aurora Innovation.

=== Other companies ===
The incident also caused other companies to temporarily cease road testing of self-driving vehicles. Nvidia CEO Jensen Huang has stated "We don't know that we would do anything different, but we should give ourselves time to see if we can learn from that incident."

=== Legal actions ===
While Herzberg was the first pedestrian killed by a self-driving car, a driver had been killed by a semi-autonomous car almost two years earlier. A reporter for The Washington Post compared Herzberg's fate with that of Bridget Driscoll who, in the United Kingdom in 1896, was the first pedestrian to be killed by an automobile.

Legal woes for Uber were among the collision fallout. Herzberg's daughter retained an attorney and together with the husband reached an undisclosed settlement on March 28 while local and federal authorities continued their investigation. Herzberg's mother, father, and son also retained legal counsel. While a confidential settlement buried the liability issue, it suggested a sufficient legal cause of action. The abundance of event data recorders left few questions of fact for a jury to decide.

Although the Yavapai County Attorney declined to charge Uber with a criminal violation in 2019 for the death of Herzberg, a Maricopa County grand jury indicted the safety driver on one count of negligent homicide in 2020. Her trial was planned for February 2021, but has been delayed because the case was designated "complex" and the discovery process is ongoing. In July 2023 Vasquez pleaded guilty to one count of endangerment, a reduced charge, and was sentenced to three years of probation.

=== Regulation ===
The National Highway Traffic Safety Administration and the American Automobile Association had previously identified nighttime driving as an area for safety improvement. This follows similar changes in attitudes against tolerating drunk driving, starting in the late 1970s through the 1990s, and has occurred in concert with a cultural shift towards active lifestyles and multi-modal use of roadways which has been formally adopted by the National Association of City Transportation Officials.

== See also ==
- Mary Ward, the first person known to have been killed by an automobile, 1869
- Bridget Driscoll, the first pedestrian death by automobile in Great Britain, 1896
- Henry H. Bliss, the first automobile death in the Americas, 1899
- Thomas Selfridge, the first person to die in an airplane crash, 1908
- Robert Williams, the first person known to be killed by a robot, 1979
- Joshua Brown, the first person killed in a car driven by Tesla Autopilot in the United States, 2016
- KitKat, a cat killed by a self-driving car in 2025
