= Pedestrian safety =

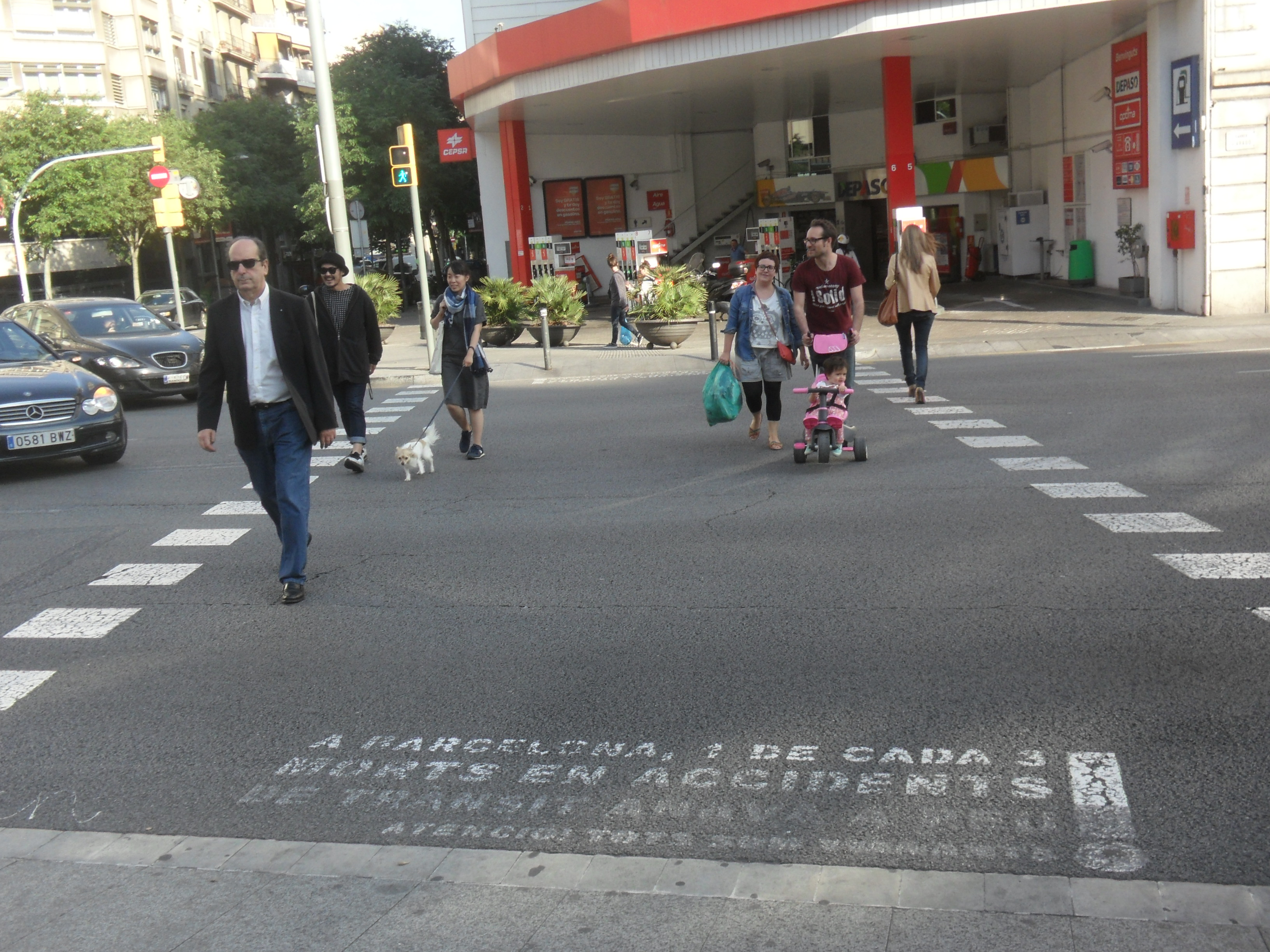
Pedestrian safety message crosswalk stencil

Improving the safety of pedestrians is an important issue. 300,000 people are killed each year due to being hit by road vehicles. The World Health Organization states that road traffic crashes are not inevitable; they are both predictable and preventable. Urban mobility policy and planning sometimes neglects walking.

Responsibility for pedestrian safety is historically contested. The idea that pedestrians are partially or wholly at fault for their injury by motorists arose in the early 20th century at least in part due to propaganda campaigns by auto lobbying groups. In some jurisdictions, these groups managed to criminalize a large category of pedestrian behaviors by introducing the concept of jaywalking.

== History and assignment of blame ==
Bridget Driscoll is often identified as the first pedestrian killed by an automobile, having been knocked to the pavement by a demonstration vehicle outside London's Crystal Palace on 17 August 1896, and thereby dying of a head injury. Several years later on 14 September 1899, Henry Bliss became the first American killed by an automobile, having been crushed by a taxicab after exiting a trolley car in New York City.

The notion of pedestrian safety emerged in the early 20th century as deaths under the tyre of the automobile grew exponentially in countries like the United States. Initially, the public generally viewed it as the motorist's responsibility to avoid hitting pedestrians. This view was contested by motordom, manifested by entities such as local chapters of what would become the American Automobile Association (AAA). These entities worked to shift some of the blame for burgeoning traffic deaths from drivers to pedestrians through multiple means. Agents of motordom, like Charlie Hayes of the Chicago Motor Club, propagandised the concept of jaywalking, which led to the criminalisation of many types of pedestrian street usage in jurisdictions that recognise the offence. Automobile "safety weeks" became venues for public shaming of pedestrians: a parade in New York City circa 1924 featured a clown, representing a jaywalker, being repeatedly struck from behind by a Model T.

AAA entered US traffic safety campaigns in the 1920s and became the leading provider of traffic safety information to schools. While independently run safety patrols made motorists stop for children in the street, AAA-operated safety patrols made children wait for the street to clear of cars before being allowed to cross. AAA also furnished materials such as coloring books inviting children to color in letters spelling out "The street is for autos". AAA's position is that drivers and pedestrians share the responsibility of keeping themselves and others on the road safe.

Western European and especially Nordic countries tend to assign more legal culpability to drivers for striking pedestrians than does the United States.

== Risks ==
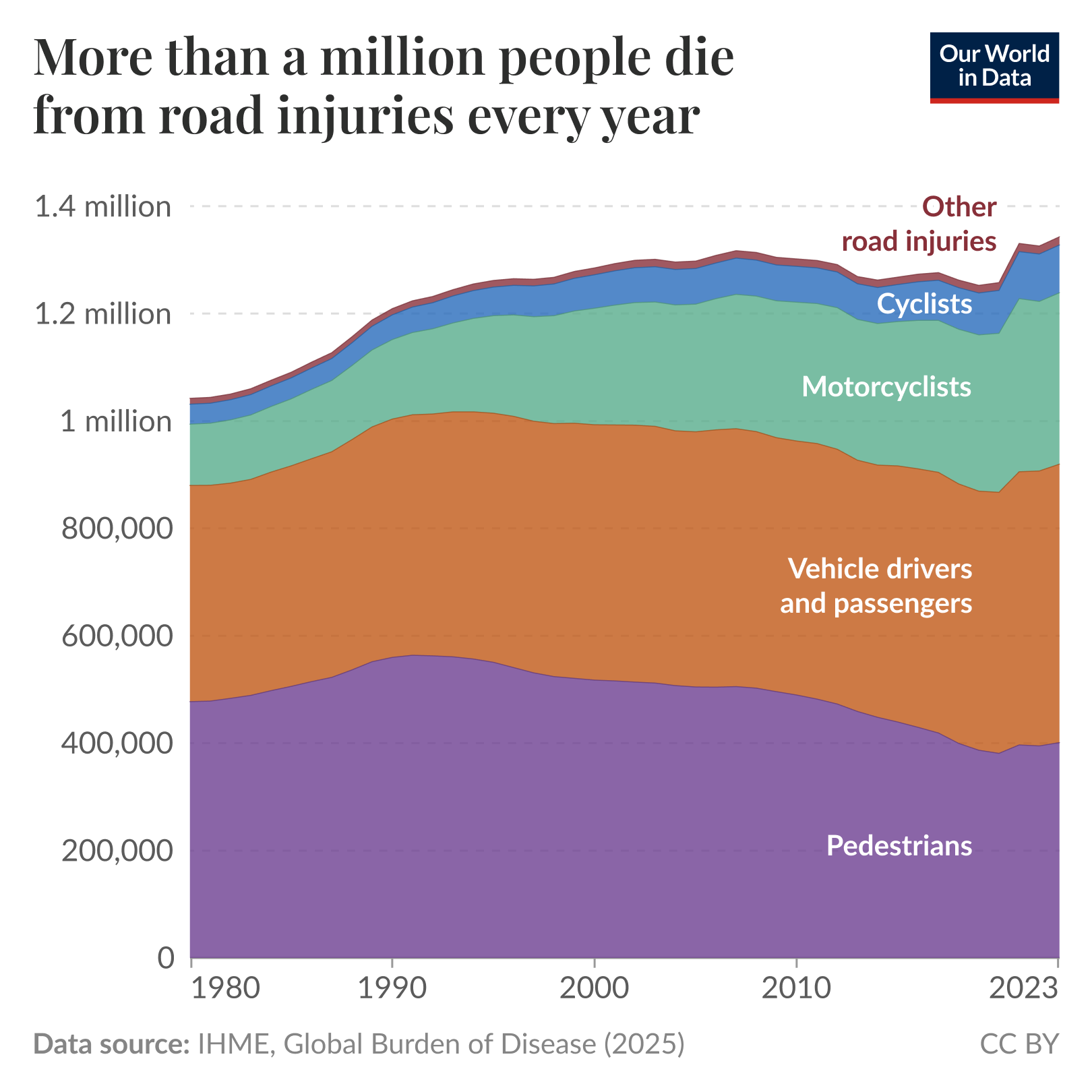
Road deaths by mode of transport.

Over 300000 pedestrians are killed each year in road crashes. Numbers vary widely between countries, and sometimes between cities in the same country. Poorer people tend to be killed more. In India, over 35000 were killed in 2023. The WHO says official statistics undercount the number killed in Africa, and estimates over 80000 were killed on the continent in 2021.

Key risks for pedestrians are well known. Among the well-documented factors are driver behaviour (including speeding and drunk driving); missing infrastructure (including footpaths, crossings, and islands); and vehicle designs that are unforgiving to pedestrians struck by a vehicle. The Traffic Injury Research Foundation describes pedestrians as vulnerable road users because they are not protected in the same way as occupants of motor vehicles.

Most pedestrian injuries occur while they are crossing a street. In the United States, 20% of pedestrian crash fatalities are linked to jaywalking, defined as improper crossing of a roadway or intersection. Most crashes involving a pedestrian occur at night. Most pedestrian fatalities are caused by frontal impact. An adult pedestrian is struck by the car's front (for instance, the bumper touches their legs), accelerating the lower part of the body forward while "the upper body is rotated and accelerated relative to the car", at which point the pelvis and thorax are hit. Then the head hits the windscreen at the velocity of the striking car. The victim then falls to the ground.

The advent of SUVs is considered a leading cause; speculation of other factors includes population growth, driver distraction with mobile phones, poor street lighting, alcohol and drugs and speeding.

Cities have had mixed results in addressing pedestrian safety through Vision Zero plans: New York City has had success. 2024 analysis of Vision Zero road upgrades in New York found an immediate reduction of about 6% in pedestrian crash incidence.

== Road design ==
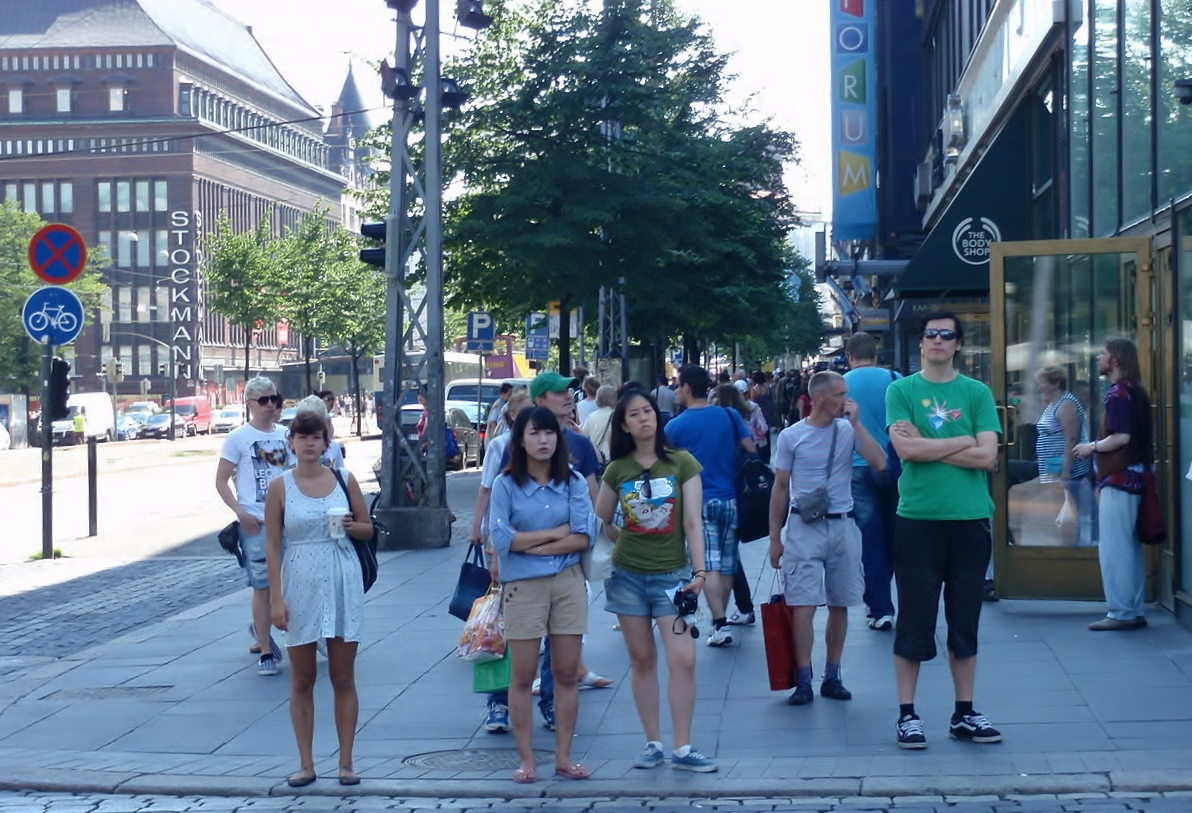
Pedestrians ready across the street next to the Forum shopping center in Helsinki, Finland

It is well documented that a minor increase in speed might greatly increase the likelihood of a crash and exacerbate resulting casualties. For this reason, the recommended maximum speed is 30 km/h (20 mph) or 40 km/h (25 mph) in residential and high pedestrian traffic areas, with enforced traffic rules on speed limits and traffic-calming measures.

Traffic lights for pedestrians are also a factor in increasing safety. Animated pedestrian traffic light showing the pan-European sign.

=== Footpaths and lack thereof ===
The design of roads and streets plays a key role in pedestrian safety. Roads are too often designed for motorized vehicles, often without accounting for pedestrian and bicycle needs. The non-existence of sidewalks and signals increases the risk for pedestrians. This defect might more easily be observed on arterial roadways, intersections, and high-speed lanes without adequate attention to pedestrian facilities. For instance, an assessment of roads in countries from many continents shows that 84% of roads are without pedestrian footpaths, while the maximum limited speed is greater than 40 km/h (20 mph). The high rate of pedestrian deaths in Africa is attributable at least in part to infrastructure development efforts focussed nearly exclusively on motorists: a study by the International Road Assessment Programme found that of the roads with the capacity for vehicle speeds in excess of 40 km/h (25 mph), less than 10% had been built with footpaths.

=== Vehicle lanes and speeds ===
Among the factors that reduce pedestrian road safety are wider lanes, roadway widening, and roadways designed for higher speeds and with more traffic lanes.

For this reason, some European cities, such as Freiburg (Germany), have lowered the speed limit to 30 km/h (20 mph) on 90% of its streets to reduce the risk to its 15 000 residents. With such a policy, 24% of daily trips are performed by foot, against 28% by bicycle, 20% by public transport, and 28% by car.

A similar set of policies to discourage car use and increase pedestrian safety has been implemented in the Northern European capitals of Oslo and Helsinki. In 2019, this resulted in both cities counting zero pedestrian deaths for the first time.

== Signs and signals ==
Hong Kong road sign

Shorter pedestrian wait times at signalised crossings reduce the likelihood of people walking on red (crossing the road against a signal), which improves safety.

== Vehicle design ==
After decades of decline, US pedestrian deaths have increased since 2009. A New York Times study concluded that higher hoods and larger vehicle blind spots from progressively larger pickups and SUVs is responsible for part of the increase.

Road vehicles designed to be slower and lighter are generally safer for pedestrians. A quarter of a million pedestrians lost their lives on the world’s roads in 2021. Despite the magnitude of the problem, most attempts at increasing pedestrian safety had historically focused solely on education and traffic regulation. Since the 1970s, crash engineers have begun to use design principles that have proved successful in protecting car occupants to develop vehicle design concepts that reduce the likelihood of injuries to pedestrians in the event of a car-pedestrian crash, or reduce the likelihood of a car-pedestrian crash in the first place.

These involve redesigning the bumper, hood (bonnet), windshield and pillar to be energy absorbing (softer) without compromising the structural integrity of the car. With the advent of ADAS (Automated Advanced Driver Assist Systems) since 2005, new pedestrian detection and crash avoidance and mitigation systems offer improvements through active rather than passive protection systems. For example, omniview technology allows a driver to see what is around the vehicle before moving. More regions are requiring heavy vehicles to have direct vision of pedestrians, rather than relying on mirrors.

Other trends in vehicle design have increased pedestrian fatalities, like increased vehicle weight and bonnet height. Taller bonnets are thought to increase the likelihood of a crash due to greater obstruction of the motorist's vision, and to increase the severity of crash injuries.

== Sociology ==
In the aftermath of a pedestrian-involved collision in the US, journalists often report that the pedestrian "darted" into the road, using language based on the National Highway Traffic Safety Administration's Model Minimum Uniform Crash Criteria (MMUCC), which police use to categorise each crash. The MMUCC defines dart or dash to mean a non-motorist suddenly entering from off the roadway. Examining federally reported crash data between 2017 and 2021, the policy director for the League of American Bicyclists questioned the plausibility of the aggregate statistic that there were 150 instances of pedestrians over the age of 75 who "darted" or "dashed" into the street before being killed in a crash.

While some reports in Africa use the word "accident", the WHO says "crash" should be preferred, as the former obscures the preventable nature of road deaths. The WHO and Bloomberg Philanthropies underwrote a study of 1000 news articles in five countries in Anglophone Africa, finding that "news in Africa typically obscures the fact that road deaths are preventable. News reports largely also fail to cover more systemic causes of road deaths such as poor infrastructure and inadequate laws, regulations and law enforcement."

Controversy exists over the extent to which criticising pedestrian behaviours constitutes victim blaming. Separately from jaywalking, which is a criminalised act in some countries, pedestrian victims of traffic crashes are also faulted for acts that are not illegal, such as not making eye contact with motorists, not giving way to motorists even when the pedestrian has right of way, wearing clothing deemed inappropriate, or wearing headphones. Media reports of pedestrian fatalities usually repeat uncritically the narrative from police accounts, and minimise the role of the motorist by passive voice constructions or by transferring grammatical agency from the motorist to the vehicle.

== Seasonality ==
In Europe, pedestrian fatalities have a seasonal factor, with 6% of annual fatalities occurring in April but 13% (twice more) in December. The reason for such a change might be complex.

== See also ==
- List of countries by traffic-related death rate
- Traffic light control and coordination
