= Marquee Theatre =

Music venue in Tempe, Arizona, US

Coordinates: 33°26′13″N 111°56′38″W

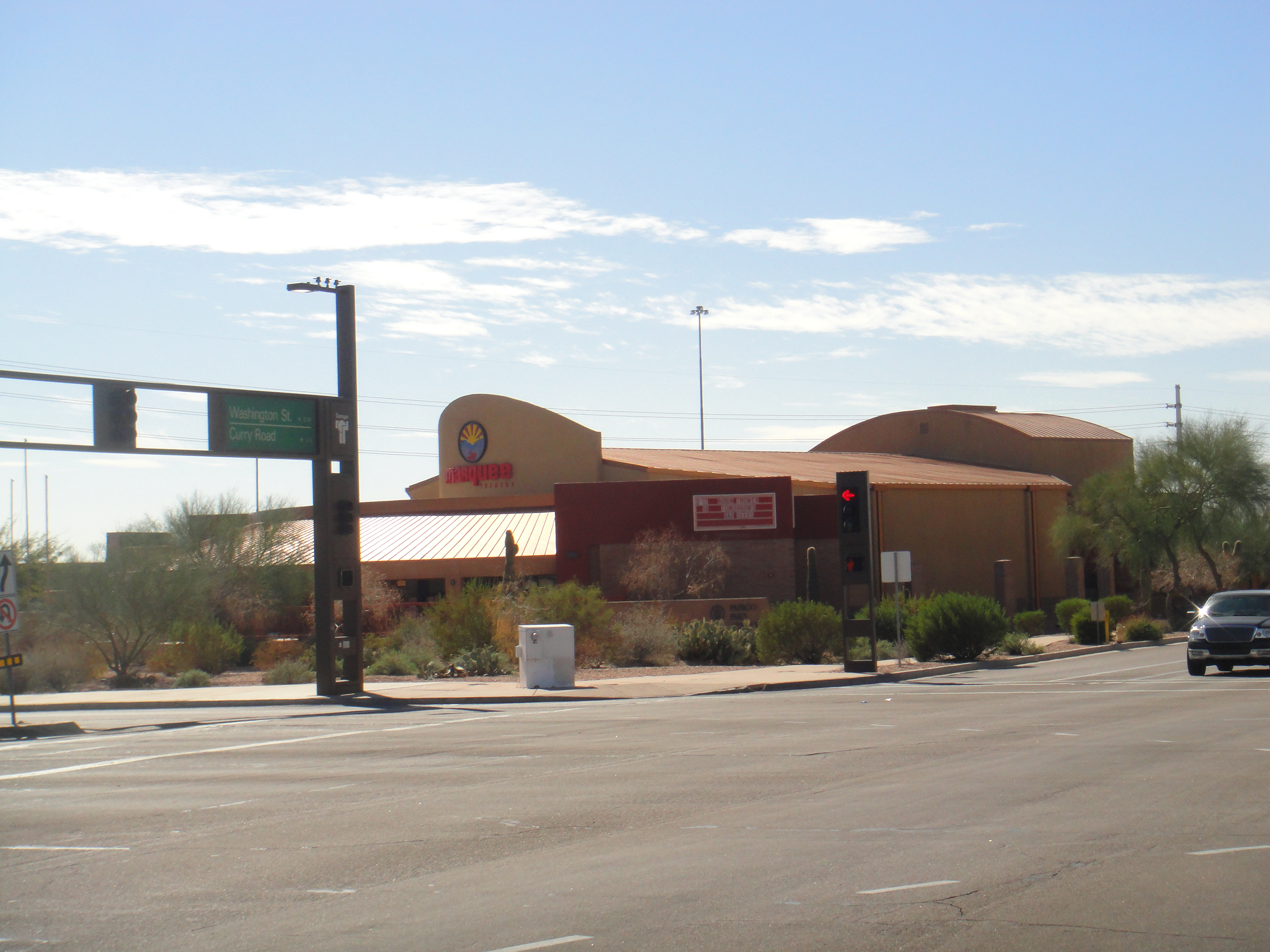
- Northeast side of the venue (c. 2011)
- Interactive map of Marquee Theatre
- Former names: Red River Opry (1993–2001)
- Address: 730 N Mill Ave; Tempe, AZ 85281
- Location: Metro Phoenix
- Owner: Lucky Man Concerts
- Capacity: 1,500

Construction
- Opened: January 22, 1993
- Reopened: March 21, 2003

Website
- Venue website

Marquee Theatre (originally known as the Red River Opry or the Red River Music Hall) is a music venue in Tempe, Arizona. The theater sits on the north side of Tempe Town Lake near the Mill Avenue Bridge, at the intersection of Mill Avenue and Washington Street, the primary business and entertainment district in Tempe.

== About ==
The venue originally opened January 1993 as the "Red River Opry" (often referred to as the "Red River Music Hall") and catered for country music. The Opry filed for bankruptcy in 2001 and closed later that year. The venue was purchased by Nobody In Particular Presents in 2002. After a year of renovations, the theatre opened in March 2003.

Tom LaPenna purchased the venue a year later. His company, Lucky Man Concerts (formerly Lucky Man Productions) has owned and operated the theatre since March 29, 2004.

The theater features festival seating and the back of the house is approximately 80 feet from the stage. It is open to all ages and alcoholic beverages are served with proper ID. Due to the Arizona smoking laws, there is no smoking permitted inside but a large outdoor patio is provided. The theatre is popular with the students of nearby Arizona State University and caters to the college-age demographic.
