= Ash Avenue Bridge =

Demolished highway bridge in Tempe, Arizona, US (1913–1991)

- The bridge in 1916
- Coordinates: 33°25′52″N 111°56′33″W
- Crossed: Salt River
- Locale: Tempe, Arizona, U.S.

Characteristics
- Design: Open-spandrel three-hinged rib arch bridge
- Material: Reinforced concrete
- Total length: 1,507 feet (459 m)
- Width: 18 feet (5.5 m) (deck width)
- No. of spans: 11

History
- Designer: James B. Girand and Carl E. Hasse
- Construction start: 1911
- Construction end: 1913
- Construction cost: $120,000
- Rebuilt: 1920, 1925
- Closed: 1933
- Demolished: 1991
- Replaced by: Mill Avenue Bridge

U.S. National Register of Historic Places
- Official name: Tempe Concrete Arch Highway Bridge
- Designated: May 7, 1984
- Reference no.: 84000743
- MPS: Tempe Multiple Resource Area

U.S. National Register of Historic Places
- Official name: Tempe Bridge
- Designated: September 30, 1988
- Delisted: October 2, 1992
- Reference no.: 88001606
- MPS: Vehicular Bridges of Arizona Multiple Property Submission

Location
- Interactive map of Ash Avenue Bridge

The Ash Avenue Bridge is a demolished road bridge in Tempe, Arizona, U.S, which formerly crossed the Salt River. The concrete open-spandrel rib arch bridge opened in 1913, using multiple advanced technologies in its design and representing a significant advance in Arizona's transportation system. Despite its pioneering design, the bridge was not designed for automobile traffic, and it was severely damaged by the Salt River's regular floods.

The bridge was replaced by the Mill Avenue Bridge in 1931, and abandoned in 1934. It was listed on the National Register of Historic Places twice, firstly in 1984 as the Tempe Concrete Arch Highway Bridge and secondly in 1988 as the Tempe Bridge. The severely deteriorated bridge was demolished in 1991. Its southern abutment remains in place, and is the centerpiece of a veterans' memorial in Tempe Beach Park.

== Background ==
The city of Tempe, Arizona was founded in the mid-19th century. The city was initially named Hayden's Ferry, after a ferry service across the Salt River established by Charles T. Hayden in the early 1870s. Railroads built bridges across the Salt River at Tempe, including the Maricopa and Phoenix in 1887 and the Phoenix and Eastern in 1904. Hayden proposed that the 1887 railroad bridge should accommodate road traffic, but his proposals were rejected by Maricopa County officials, and the ferry continued to operate.

Bridge construction across the Salt River at Tempe was complicated by multiple factors. The first railroad bridges were continually washed out by the Salt River's forceful floods. The 1887 wooden bridge failed only four years after its construction, and the 1904 steel bridge washed out in a flood in 1905.

A group of Tempe business leaders petitioned the Arizona Territorial Legislature for a bridge across the Salt River in 1908. In the spring of 1909, the legislature created the office of Territorial Engineer and instituted a road tax. This action replaced the counties as the primary funders and planners of road construction. The first and only Territorial Engineer, James B. Girand, sought to develop a network of improved roads to connect to each county seat. The legislature allocated funds for the construction of a bridge at Tempe in late 1909, which was described initially as a wagon bridge.

== Design and construction ==
The Ash Avenue Bridge was an 11-span arch bridge, constructed of reinforced concrete. Each span is an open-spandrel rib arch, with the space between both horizontal and vertical structural members left open. Additionally, each span was designed as a three-hinged arch, making it one of the earliest American examples of a hinged arch bridge.

The initial plans for the bridge, prepared under Girand's supervision, were for a 9-span closed-spandrel concrete arch bridge. For unknown reasons, the design was significantly modified by Girand's associate Carl E. Hasse to the final 11-span design.

The design of the Ash Avenue Bridge was a pioneering example of reinforced concrete bridge construction. Its combination of the open-spandrel, rib arch, and three-hinged designs was very rare in the United States in the early 1910s. One of its closest contemporaries is the 1913 Colorado Street Bridge in Pasadena, California, an open-spandrel rib-arch bridge of similar length to the Ash Avenue Bridge.

The bridge's 11 spans were set on piers of varying design, using multiple types and sizes of caissons to reach bedrock under the riverbed. Victor H. Cochrane of Kansas City, Missouri publicly criticized the bridge's pier design in a May 1912 editorial in Engineering News, arguing that the piers were too weak to function in combination with the three-hinged arch design.

Construction for the Ash Avenue Bridge began in the spring of 1911, employing a crew of prisoners from the territorial prison in Florence. The bridge was one of the final pieces of infrastructure in Arizona built with convict labor. Prisoners were confined overnight, but were not guarded while working, in an arrangement endorsed by Governor George W. P. Hunt after his election in 1912. Approximately 250 prisoners worked on the bridge from 1911 to 1913. The final construction cost of the bridge was approximately $120,000, equivalent to $2.9 million in 2025.

== Service life and replacement ==
An automobile on the bridge in August 1913

The bridge opened to traffic in 1913. It carried both local and long-distance traffic, serving as the main link between the cities of Tempe and Phoenix. It was the second road bridge over the Salt River, opening two years after the Center Street (now Central Avenue) bridge in Phoenix.

The bridge immediately became the busiest in the state upon its opening. By 1921, it carried 3,000 vehicles per day. Floods in late 1919 and early 1920 caused significant damage to the underpinnings of one of the bridge's piers. The affected pier settled downward by approximately 4 1/2 inches (11 cm) in 1919 and an additional 6 inches (15 cm) by the spring of 1920, causing significant deformation to the bridge deck. The damaged pier was repaired with new concrete footings, but it was never raised back to its original height. In 1925, the bridge was closed for two weeks to replace cracked concrete that was damaged by vibration from heavy trucks.

By the late 1920s, the bridge was in poor condition. A 1925 article in Arizona Highways magazine asserted that "its days are numbered," and a Tempe business association made a formal request to the State Highway Commission for a replacement bridge in 1928. Its deck was 18 feet (5.5 m) wide, which became insufficient for the increasing volume of traffic. Construction on a replacement bridge began in 1930, and the Mill Avenue Bridge opened to traffic in 1931.

== Abandonment ==
Failed structural members in 1990

After the Mill Avenue Bridge opened, the Ash Avenue Bridge was briefly in use as a pedestrian bridge. It was formally abandoned and closed by the State Highway Department in 1934.

The bridge was listed on the National Register of Historic Places in the 1980s. It was first added to the register in 1984 under the Tempe Multiple Resource Area, which documented historic properties in the city of Tempe. A second listing in 1988, under the Vehicular Bridges in Arizona Multiple Property Submission, discussed the bridge in the context of Arizona's road transportation system from 1863 to 1940.

The city of Tempe commissioned a study of the bridge in 1990, during the planning for the Tempe Town Lake project. The study argued that the only safe alternatives for the bridge were to either perform "significant and costly rehabilitation, repair, and modifications to the main arch ribs and other primary members" or to demolish it. The bridge was demolished in 1991. The 1988 National Register of Historic Places nomination was withdrawn after the bridge was demolished, but the 1984 listing remains active as of October 2026.

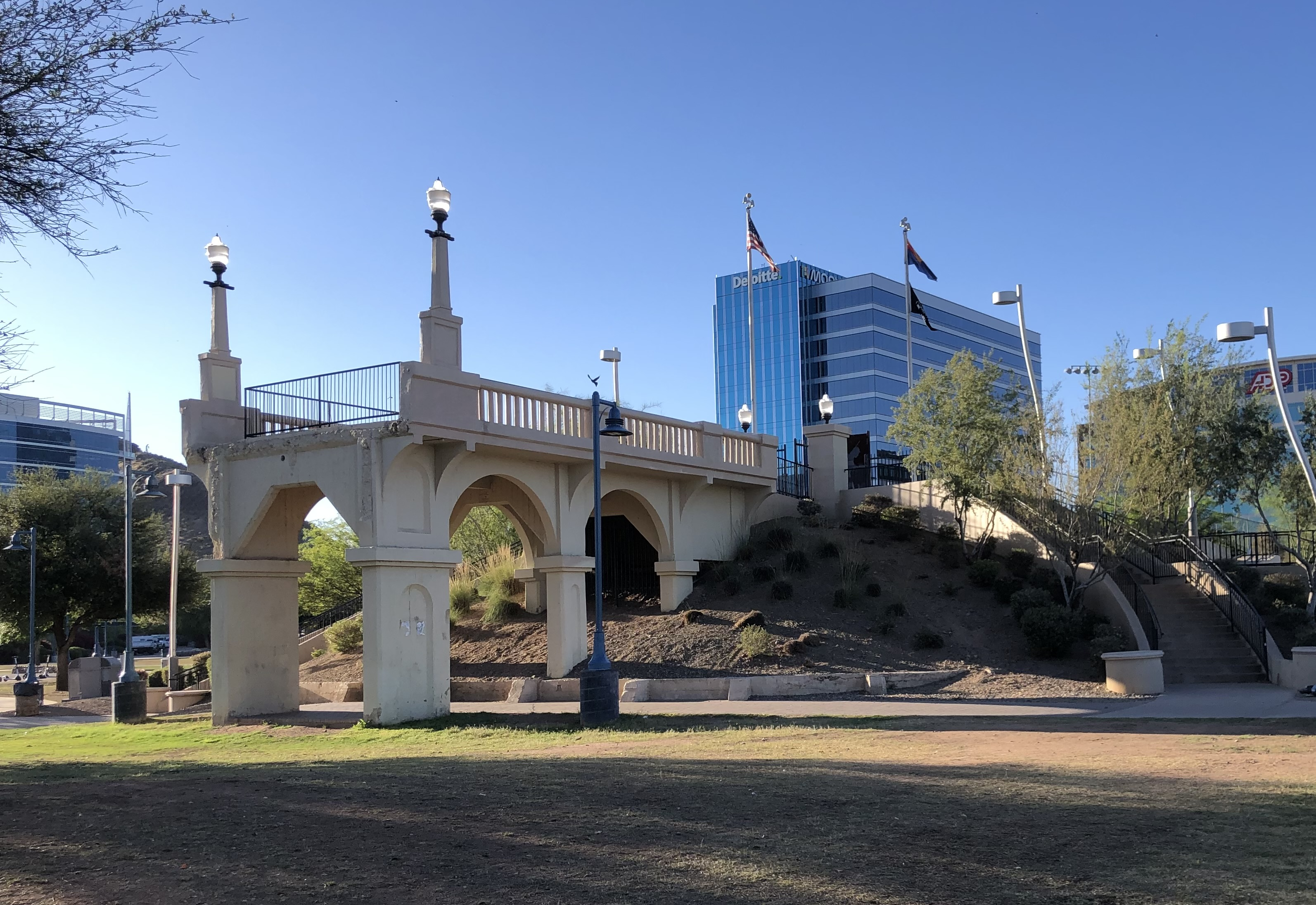
The remaining abutment in 2023

The southern abutment of the bridge was not demolished. In the early 2010s, the remaining structure was redeveloped as a veterans' memorial, honoring veterans from the state of Arizona in all branches of the United States military. The bridge abutment is open to the public as an overlook.

== Legacy ==
Piers of the Ash Avenue Bridge (foreground) and the visually similar Mill Avenue Bridge (left) in 1990

Arizona was admitted as a state in 1912, during the Ash Avenue Bridge's construction. Statehood was accompanied by a dramatic increase in highway funding, and the Arizona State Highway Department began purchasing bridge designs such as the Luten arch in addition to its in-house designs. The Mill Avenue Bridge, the Ash Avenue Bridge's successor, was the only other open-spandrel concrete arch bridge built by the state of Arizona. Its design was prepared to a much higher standard, and it withstood multiple significant floods during the late 20th century.

== In popular culture ==
The bridge was featured in the 1977 film Speedtrap.
