= Tempe Police Department =

Law enforcement agency in Tempe Arizona

- Common name: Tempe Police Department
- Abbreviation: Tempe PD
- Motto: Honor - Integrity - Loyalty - Dedication

Agency overview
- Formed: 1895; 131 years ago
- Preceding agency: Municipal Police

Jurisdictional structure
- Operations jurisdiction: Tempe, Arizona, USA
- Population: 170,000
- General nature: Local civilian police

Operational structure
- Headquarters: 120 E. Fifth St.
- Agency executive: Kenneth McCoy, Chief of Police

Website
- http://www.tempe.gov/police

The Tempe Police Department is the primary law enforcement in the City of Tempe, Arizona.

The Town of Tempe was incorporated in November 1894 and as the population increased, George Compton was elected the town's first marshal on January 14, 1895. By 1901, law enforcement expanded with the purchase of a motorcycle to assist with enforcing the town's speed ordinance. Growth continued between 1920 and 1922 and a night police officer was added to assist policing. In 1928, a German Shepherd police dog was loaned to the town by the Los Angeles Police Department to supplement the marshals’ efforts.

One additional night officer was added in the 1930s and mobility increased with the purchase of a patrol car in 1938. A short wave radio and siren would be added to the car by 1941. As the town and police force expanded, the title of marshal was changed to police chief in 1949.

As the town's population continued to grow into the 1960s and 1970s, the department continued to expand. In 1974, the department created the state's first police mounted unit; in 1975 a SWAT Team was formed and by 1979 a K-9 unit was operational.

The city of Tempe continued to grow and had more than 100,000 residents by the 1980s. The department responded to this population growth implementing community policing techniques of the time by 1988. In this same year, the department started the Citizen's Police Academy along with the Volunteers in Policing (VIP) Program.

During the 1990s, the Tempe Police Department continued to grow as events associated with a bustling downtown, Arizona State University and numerous special events grew in size and number. The department's police officers provided security and public safety for college football national championships, professional football championships and one of the nation's largest New Year's Eve block parties. In 1992, the Bike Squad was created to provide a proactive group of officers able to quickly respond for service within the congested downtown. During Fiscal Year 2003–04, Tempe Police Department had increased to 326 sworn officers and 182 civilian support employees.

The department's most recent objectives include the use of intelligence-led policing. This includes the creation of a Crime and Intelligence Center, more streamlined internal communication and improved relationships with other law enforcement and government agencies.

As of 2019, the Tempe Police Department had more than 338 sworn police officers in patrol, investigations and support areas and approximately 142 civilian staff serving a jail, identification unit, communications and records groups and numerous other support units and positions. The employees serve a community of over 170,000 residents in addition to an influx of more than 50,000 college students and thousands of people who study and work in Tempe.

== Misconduct and Controversy ==
In July 2012, press reports showed that Officer Aaron Smith had been arrested for stealing money, bikes and other equipment from police headquarters. Smith pleaded guilty to a single theft charge and was sentenced to 90 days in jail and three years probation.

On January 15, 2019, Officer Joseph Jaen responded to a 911 call about an in progress burglary of a vehicle in an alley. Footage shows Jaen exited his vehicle and hid behind a dumpster, drawing his service weapon and pointing it at a figure in a pickup truck. Jaen failed to identify himself as law enforcement, only saying "hey" when 14 year old Antonio Arce fled on foot down the alley. Jaen takes two shots at Arce's back from approximately 50 yards away, one bullet striking the teenager between the shoulder blades. Jaen pursues Arce through the alley, finding him collapsed on the street. Antonio Arce later died at the hospital. For months the Tempe Police Department refused to release information to the family and lawyers without requiring a non-disclosure agreement with a $1 million penalty, an unprecedented stipulation for the release of public records. Jaen resigned over the incident. After a year of investigating Phoenix prosecutors declined to press charges. Despite concluding that Arce did not match the description of a 40 year old suspect as reported by Jaen, Arizona being an open carry state, Arce running away from the officer, and being over 100 feet away when Jaen opened fire, the prosecutors believed they would not have won a conviction in court. Jaen was also granted an early accidental disability retirement by the retirement board in January 2020, which allows him to collect a pension. "An accidental disability is one that occurred while the employee was on the clock and permanently prevents the employee from doing his or her job."

Date	Incident Type	Civilians	Officers	Details	Outcomes	Source
July 28, 2012	Theft		Aaron Smith	Arrested for theft of equipment and evidence.	Resigned. Pleaded guilty and sentenced to 90 days jail time and 3 years probation.	
January 15, 2019	Police Shooting	Antonio Arce	Joseph Jaen	Joseph Jaen shot 14 year old Antonio Arce in the back as Arce ran down an alley.	Resigned. No charges filed. Retirement board granted Jaen disability retirement.	
June 15, 2019		Ivaughn Oakry	Ronald Kerzaya	Officer Ronald Kerzaya and other officers shocked Ivaughn Oakry 3 times with stun guns while the Oakry was holding his 1-year-old child in his home. The event was captured on body camera.	No charges filed. Oakry's attorneys have sent a notice of claim to the city seeking $5.5 million for excessive use of force, trauma and a violation of Oakry's constitutional rights.	
August 29, 2020			Ronald Kerzaya	Officer Ronald Kerzaya held a black man who was an employee of the Hawthorn Suites hotel near Loop 101 and Southern Avenue at gunpoint while responding to a call over a white man with a gun at the location. Ironically, Kerzaya has thus far proven to be the only white man with a gun on the scene. The event was captured on body camera.	No charges filed. Tempe Mayor Corey Woods released a statement calling the incident "both disturbing and disappointing". The incident is still under investigation.	
