= Death of Henry H. Bliss =

1899 automobile accident in New York City; first death due to car accidents in the US

Henry Hale Bliss
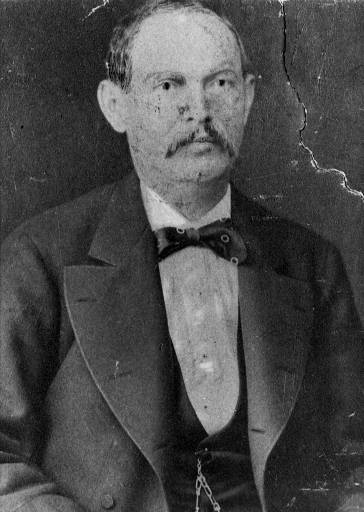
- Bliss in 1873
- Born: June 13, 1830
- Died: September 14, 1899 (aged 69); Manhattan, New York, U.S.
- Cause of death: Car crash
- Known for: First recorded instance of a person being killed in a motor vehicle collision in the United States.

Henry Hale Bliss (June 13, 1830 – September 14, 1899) was the first known person killed in a motor vehicle collision in the United States.

== Death ==
On September 13, 1899, at West 74th Street and Central Park West in New York City, Henry Hale Bliss, a 69-year-old local real estate dealer, was alighting from a south bound 8th Avenue trolley car when he was struck by the driver of an electric-powered taxicab (Automobile No. 43). Bliss hit the pavement, crushing his head and chest. He was taken by ambulance to Roosevelt Hospital, but upon arrival the house surgeon, Dr. Marny, said his injuries were too severe to survive, and Bliss died from his sustained injuries the next morning.

Arthur Smith, the driver of the taxicab, claimed that a large truck occupied the right side of the avenue, making it necessary to drive his vehicle closer to the car. Smith was arrested and charged with manslaughter, but was subsequently acquitted on the grounds that he had no malice, nor was he negligent.

The passenger of the taxi-cab, Dr. David Orr Edson, was the son of former New York City mayor Franklin Edson.

== Legacy ==
A plaque was dedicated at the site on September 13, 1999, to commemorate the centenary of this event. It reads:

Here at West 74th Street and Central Park West, Henry H. Bliss dismounted from a streetcar and was struck and knocked unconscious by an automobile on the evening of September 13, 1899. When Mr. Bliss, a New York real estate man, died the next morning from his injuries, he became the first recorded motor vehicle fatality in the Western Hemisphere. (Note: In this context "Western Hemisphere" is taken to mean "The half of the earth comprising North and South America and surrounding waters" as opposed to the true geographical definition of "for the half of Earth which lies west of the prime meridian (which crosses Greenwich, London, United Kingdom) and east of the antimeridian".) This sign was erected to remember Mr. Bliss on the centennial of his untimely death and to promote safety on our streets and highways.

The ceremony was attended by his great-granddaughter, who placed roses on the place where Bliss was struck.

== Family ==
Bliss's stepdaughter, Mary Alice Altmont Livingston, who assumed the surname "Fleming", was later tried for the murder of her mother, Bliss's ex-wife, Evelina Bliss, by means of poisoned chowder in 1895. She was found innocent.

== See also ==
- Mary Ward – (1827–1869) Anglo-Irish scientist, the first person known to have been killed by a car, Ireland, 1869. Also the first person killed by a car in the United Kingdom and in the entire Western Hemisphere.
- Bridget Driscoll – (1851/1852–1896) the first pedestrian to be killed in a collision with a car in Great Britain.
- Elaine Herzberg – (1968–2018) the first pedestrian to be killed in an autonomous motor car crash
