= Mill Avenue bridges =

Concrete arch bridges in Tempe, Arizona, US

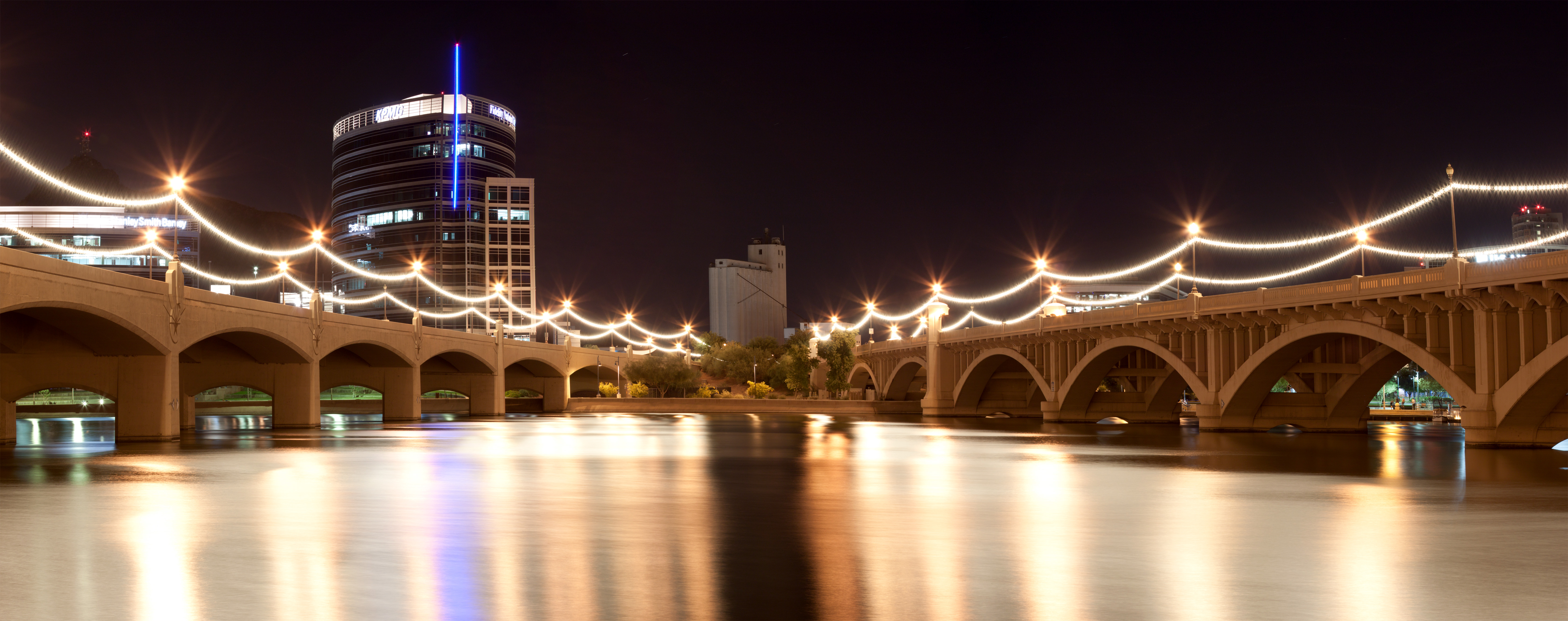
- The 1993 (left) and 1931 (right) bridges in 2011
- Coordinates: 33.4336069°N 111.9411619°W
- Carries: Mill Avenue; Historic US 80
- Crosses: Tempe Town Lake
- Locale: Tempe, Arizona, U.S.
- Owner: City of Tempe
- Preceded by: Ash Avenue Bridge

Characteristics
- Material: Reinforced concrete
- Total length: Southbound span: 1,577 feet (481 m); Northbound span: 1,510 feet (460 m)

History
- Opened: Southbound span: 1931; Northbound span: 1994

Statistics
- Daily traffic: 9,245 (Northbound AADT, 2023)
- 1931 Tempe Bridge
- U.S. National Register of Historic Places
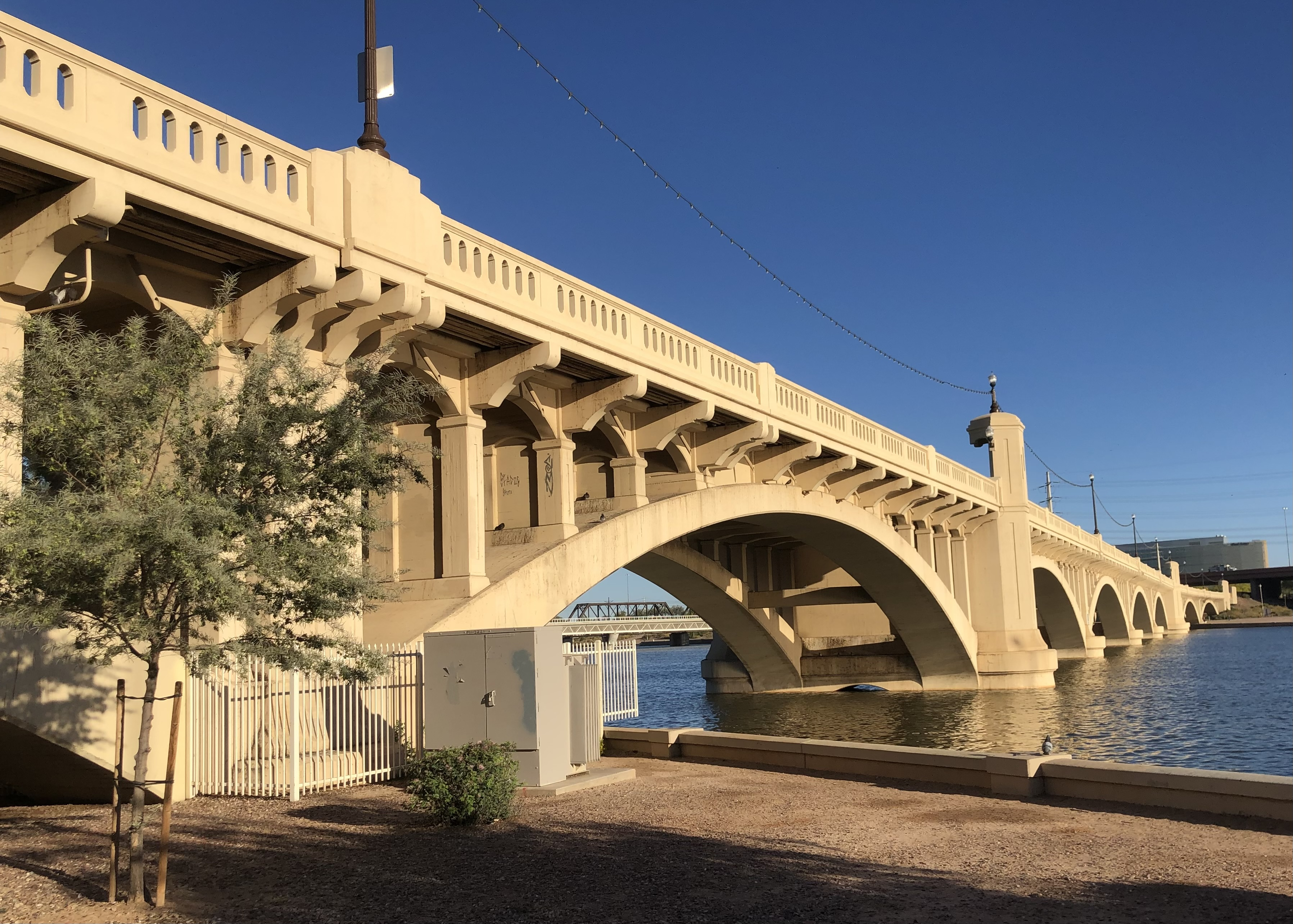
- Detail of the 1931 bridge's structure
- Built: 1931
- Architect: Ralph Hoffman
- NRHP reference No.: 81000137
- Added to NRHP: August 13, 1981

Location
- Interactive map of Mill Avenue bridges

The Mill Avenue bridges are two reinforced concrete bridges in Tempe, Arizona, U.S., carrying Mill Avenue and Historic U.S. Route 80 over the Salt River at Tempe Town Lake. The present-day southbound bridge opened in 1931, and is listed on the National Register of Historic Places as the 1931 Tempe Bridge. The northbound bridge opened in 1993, replacing a roadway across the formerly dry riverbed. Both bridges are owned and maintained by the city of Tempe.

== 1931 bridge ==
=== Background ===
The city of Tempe's first road bridge across the Salt River was the Ash Avenue Bridge, which opened in 1913. It was the second road bridge across the Salt River, and represented a major advancement in Arizona highway engineering. The Ash Avenue Bridge was undersized and structurally inadequate, and it was damaged by multiple severe floods in the 1920s. A Tempe business association made an appeal to the State Highway Commission in May 1928, requesting a new bridge across the Salt River at Tempe. The request was approved by the commission, using federal-aid highway funds.

=== Design and construction ===
The 1931 Mill Avenue bridge was designed by Ralph Hoffman, who was hired as a staff bridge engineer around 1920. Hoffman's design for the Mill Avenue bridge was visually similar to its predecessor the Ash Avenue Bridge, specifying an open-spandrel arch rib design constructed from reinforced concrete. The bridge is 1,577 feet (481 m) long across ten arched spans, with a 36-foot (11 m) roadway and 5-foot (1.5 m) sidewalks on either side. The deck of the bridge features eight hexagonal pedestrian rest stations, which form a visual extension of the bridge's vertical structure.

The State Highway Department surveyed and planned the bridge, and the surveyors recommended a minor change to the bridge's location after discovering a shallow granite ridge underneath the riverbed. Relocating the bridge to place its foundations in shallow bedrock reduced costs substantially over the alternative of drilling foundations 50 feet (15 m) into the caliche riverbed. Bids for the construction were opened in January 1930, and the Lynch-Cannon Engineering Company of Los Angeles was awarded the contract for $397,608, equivalent to $6.1 million in 2025.

Construction began in late March 1930, using a concrete plant built adjacent to an existing gravel plant in the riverbed. As construction began on the ninth pier, the construction crews discovered that the surveyors had not found bedrock at its planned location. The surveyors had instead drilled down to a large boulder, which they assumed to be bedrock. The actual bedrock at the location of the ninth pier was located, and additional excavation work was required. Despite the delay, concrete pouring for the main structure was complete by May 1931, with additional concrete work continuing until June 3.

=== Opening ===
The Mill Avenue bridge opened to traffic in July 1931 with little ceremony. At the time of its completion, it was the longest highway bridge in the state of Arizona. The Mill Avenue and Ash Avenue bridges were the only open-spandrel concrete arch bridges built in Arizona, with most other 1920s concrete arch bridges using the Luten arch design or derivatives of it. A two-day grand opening ceremony was held on April 29–30, 1933, presided over by Governor Benjamin Baker Moeur.

=== Unbridged crossing and flooding ===
The Mill Avenue bridge was subject to frequent flooding in the early years of its service life, including a 1940–41 flood that produced water flows of an estimated 100,000 cubic feet per second (2,800 m^{3}/s). The construction of dams upstream of the Phoenix area left the Salt River with less and less flow throughout the mid-20th century, and traffic volumes over the bridge increased substantially in the same time period. The State Highway Department constructed a roadway on the riverbed in 1961, which carried northbound traffic when no water was flowing in the river. The roadway was rebuilt after being washed out in a 1966 flood, which also destroyed a similar riverbed crossing in Scottsdale.

During a series of major floods from the 1960s through the 1980s, the Mill Avenue bridge generally remained open, even as other bridges in the region were closed for repairs. The bridge withstood 120,000 cu ft/s (3,400 m^{3}/s) of water flow in a 1965 flood, and 200,000 cu ft/s (5,700 m^{3}/s) in 1980. During the 1980 flood, all but two of the Salt River bridges were temporarily closed. The Mill Avenue bridge remained open, carrying all road traffic from Phoenix to the East Valley. To relieve traffic on the Mill Avenue bridge, the Arizona Department of Transportation (ADOT) arranged a temporary commuter rail service over the nearby Southern Pacific railroad bridge. The commuter rail service, nicknamed the "Hattie B." after First Lady of Arizona Harriet C. Babbitt, carried a total of 46,000 passengers over two weeks.

=== Historic designation ===
The 1931 bridge was listed on the National Register of Historic Places in 1981. The bridge's National Register nomination praised its design and construction, concluding that "After 50 years of hard service, the Tempe Bridge remains in exceptionally fine structural condition. The excellence of its design has permitted it to withstand traffic and flood stresses far beyond the intent of the original engineers."

== 1993 bridge ==
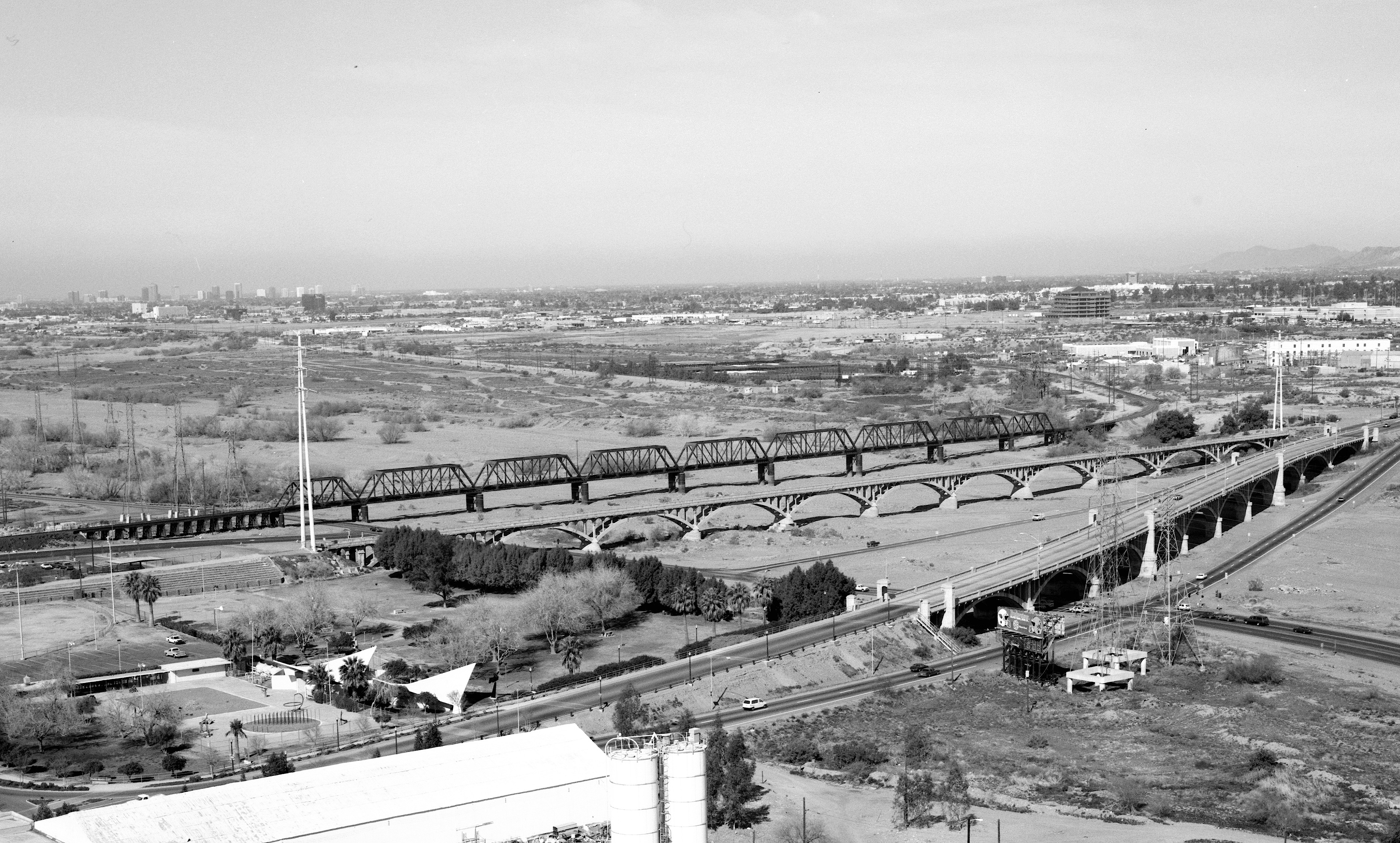
The Salt River at Tempe in 1989. Left to right: Southern Pacific railroad bridge, Ash Avenue Bridge, 1931 Mill Avenue Bridge

=== Tempe Town Lake plans ===
The 1931 Mill Avenue bridge held strong against the floods of the 1970s and 1980s, in part due to its strong foundations in bedrock. In the aftermath of the 1980 flood, the Arizona Department of Transportation instituted higher standards for new Salt River bridges, requiring them to withstand 200,000 cu ft/s (5,700 m^{3}/s) of water flow.

The floods occurred after years of discussion about the management of the Salt River, which included a 1966 flood control and property development proposal by a group of Arizona State University architecture students and faculty. The Tempe Rio Salado Commission was formed in 1987 by the city of Tempe, with the goal of redeveloping Tempe's portion of the Salt River. Planning for the Tempe Rio Salado Project was completed in 1990, and included flood control, redevelopment of properties along the river, and the creation of an artificial lake with recreational facilities. The artificial lake, now known as Tempe Town Lake, was completed in 1999.

=== Construction and opening ===
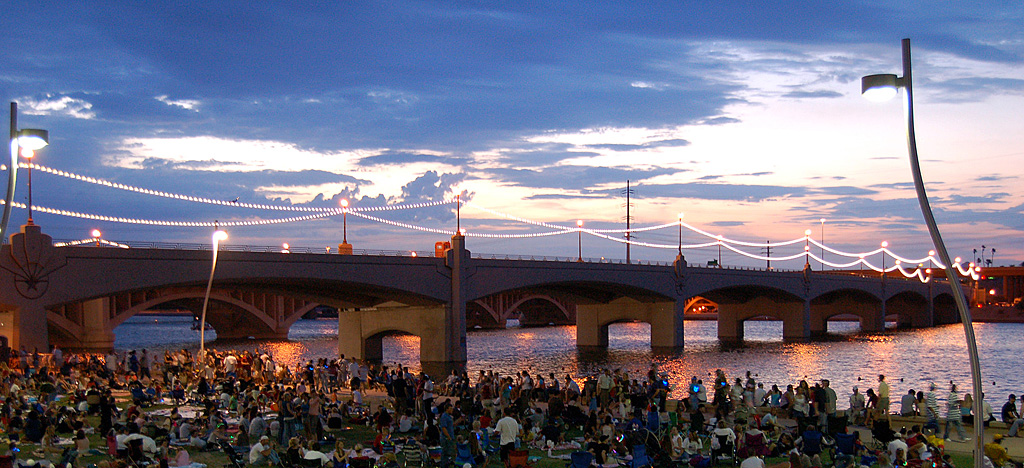
The bridges on Independence Day 2006

Construction on a second Salt River bridge at Tempe began in 1992 as part of the Rio Salado Project. The Second Mill Avenue Bridge cost $6.9 million, equivalent to $14.2 million in 2025. Like its earlier sibling, the Second Mill Avenue Bridge is constructed from reinforced concrete. A flood in January 1993 destroyed wooden forms in the riverbed, delaying the bridge's opening from a planned date in July 1993.

The second bridge opened to traffic on December 8, 1993, 11 months to the day after its construction site was damaged by the January flooding. A formal opening ceremony was held in February 1994, hosted by Tempe mayor Harry Mitchell and attended by over 2,000 members of the public.

=== 21st century reconfiguration ===
In 2018, the northern side of the northbound bridge was the site of a fatal collision involving a prototype self-driving car operated by Uber, which resulted in the death of 49-year-old pedestrian Elaine Herzberg. The collision was an early instance of a fatality related to self-driving cars, and received significant media coverage. The 2018 crash occurred as Herzberg was crossing Mill Avenue at a median that featured decorative bricks, which appeared similar to a pathway. The Uber self-driving car failed to properly detect Herzberg as she crossed the street with her bicycle, and the Uber employee monitoring the prototype car's systems was not paying attention to the road at the time of the crash. Following the 2018 crash, the decorative brick at the northern bridge approach was replaced with rocks, and additional signs were installed.

The lighting on the Mill Avenue bridges was replaced with LED bulbs in 2023, as part of a $22 million streetscape project in downtown Tempe.
