= Death of Bridget Driscoll =

First pedestrian victim of an automobile collision

Bridget Driscoll
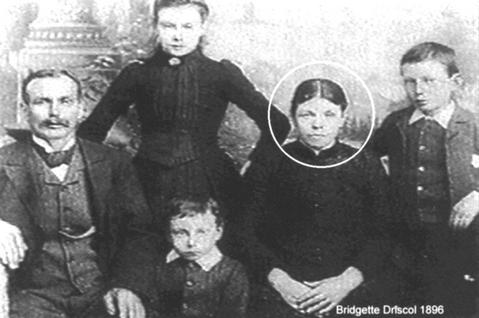
- Bridget Driscoll (circled)
- Born: Bridget Swift; 1851/1852; Ireland
- Died: 17 August 1896 (aged 44); Croydon, Surrey, England
- Resting place: Queen's Road Cemetery
- Known for: First recorded pedestrian to be killed by a motor car in Great Britain

The death of Bridget Driscoll (née Swift; c. 1851 – 17 August 1896) was the first recorded case of a pedestrian killed in a collision with a motor car in Great Britain.

Driscoll was born in Ireland but living in Croydon, Surrey with her husband and children at the time of her death. She had planned a three-day trip to London to attend a League of the Cross festival. She was in the company of her teenage daughter May and her friend Elizabeth Murphy and was crossing Dolphin Terrace in the grounds of the Crystal Palace in London when she was struck by the driver of a car belonging to the Anglo-French Motor Carriage Company that was being used to give demonstration rides. One witness described the car as being driven at "a reckless pace, in fact, like a fire engine".

Although the car's maximum speed was 8 miles per hour (13 km/h), it had been limited deliberately to 4 miles per hour (6.4 km/h), the speed at which the driver, Arthur James Edsall of Upper Norwood, claimed to have been travelling. His passenger, Alice Standing of Forest Hill, alleged he modified the engine to allow the car to go faster, but another taxicab driver examined the car and said it was incapable of exceeding 4.5 miles per hour (7.2 km/h) because of a low-speed engine belt. The collision happened just a few weeks after a new act of parliament had increased the speed limit for cars to 14 miles per hour (23 km/h), from 2 miles per hour in towns and 4 miles per hour in the countryside.

The jury returned a verdict of "accidental death" after an inquest lasting some six hours. The coroner, Percy Morrison (Croydon division of Surrey), said he hoped "such a thing would never happen again". The Royal Society for the Prevention of Accidents estimated 550,000 people had been killed on UK roads by 2010.

== See also ==
- Mary Ward (scientist), first motor vehicle fatality in the world, in Ireland (1827–1869)
- Henry H. Bliss (1830–1899), first motor vehicle fatality in the Americas
- Harrow on the Hill § Street accident fatality, first motor car driver fatality in Great Britain (1899)
- Elaine Herzberg, first pedestrian killed by an autonomous motor car (2018)
