= Tempe Town Lake =

Waterbody in Tempe, Arizona

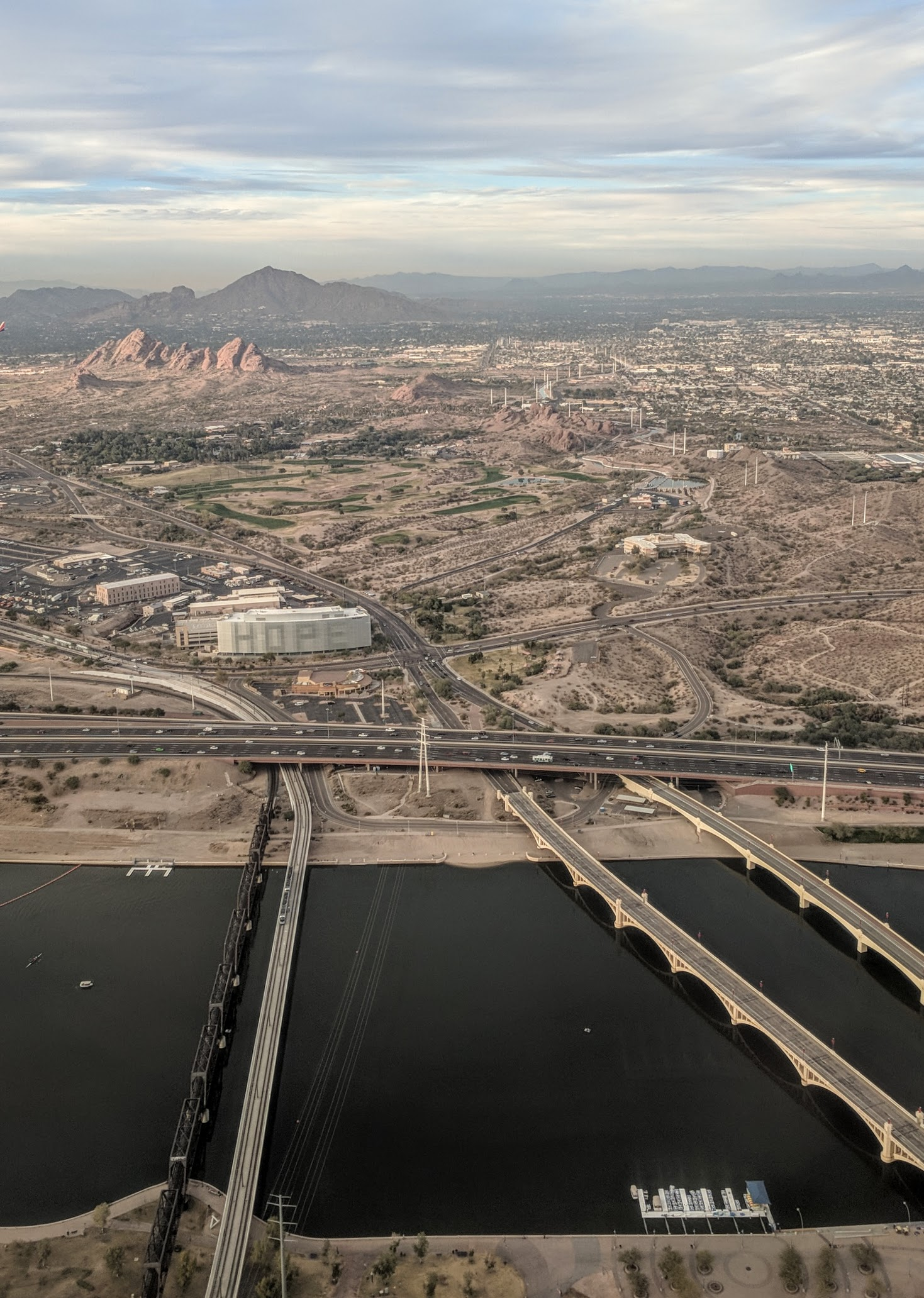
- Bridges across the Tempe Town Lake on the Salt River, with Tempe Beach Park in the foreground

- Location within Arizona
- Location: Tempe, Arizona, United States
- Coordinates: 33°25′56″N 111°55′55″W
- Lake type: Reservoir
- Primary inflows: Central Arizona Project; Salt River; Indian Bend Wash
- Primary outflows: Salt River
- Basin countries: United States
- Built: August 8, 1997
- First flooded: June 2, 1999
- Max. length: 2 mi (3.2 km)
- Max. width: 1,200 ft (370 m)
- Surface area: 224 acres (0.91 km^{2})
- Average depth: 16 ft (4.9 m)
- Max. depth: 19 ft (5.8 m)
- Water volume: 977 million US gallons (3,700,000 m^{3})
- Surface elevation: 1,150 ft (350 m)
- Settlements: Tempe

Tempe Town Lake is an artificial perennial reservoir located just north of Tempe Butte at the confluence of the intermittent Salt River and the ephemeral Indian Bend Wash in Tempe, Arizona, United States. The reservoir receives most of its water from the Colorado River through the Central Arizona Project.

On July 20, 2010, a portion of the west side of the dam that contained the water in the lake collapsed, sending a flood of water into the Salt River and draining the lake.

== History ==
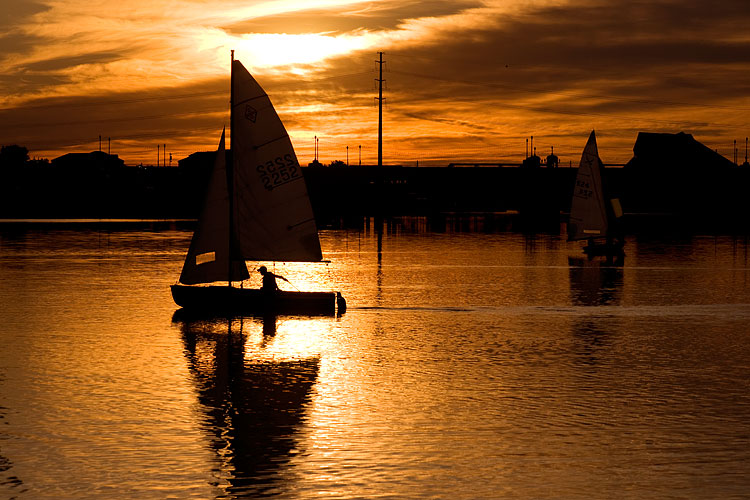
Sailboats at Tempe Town Lake

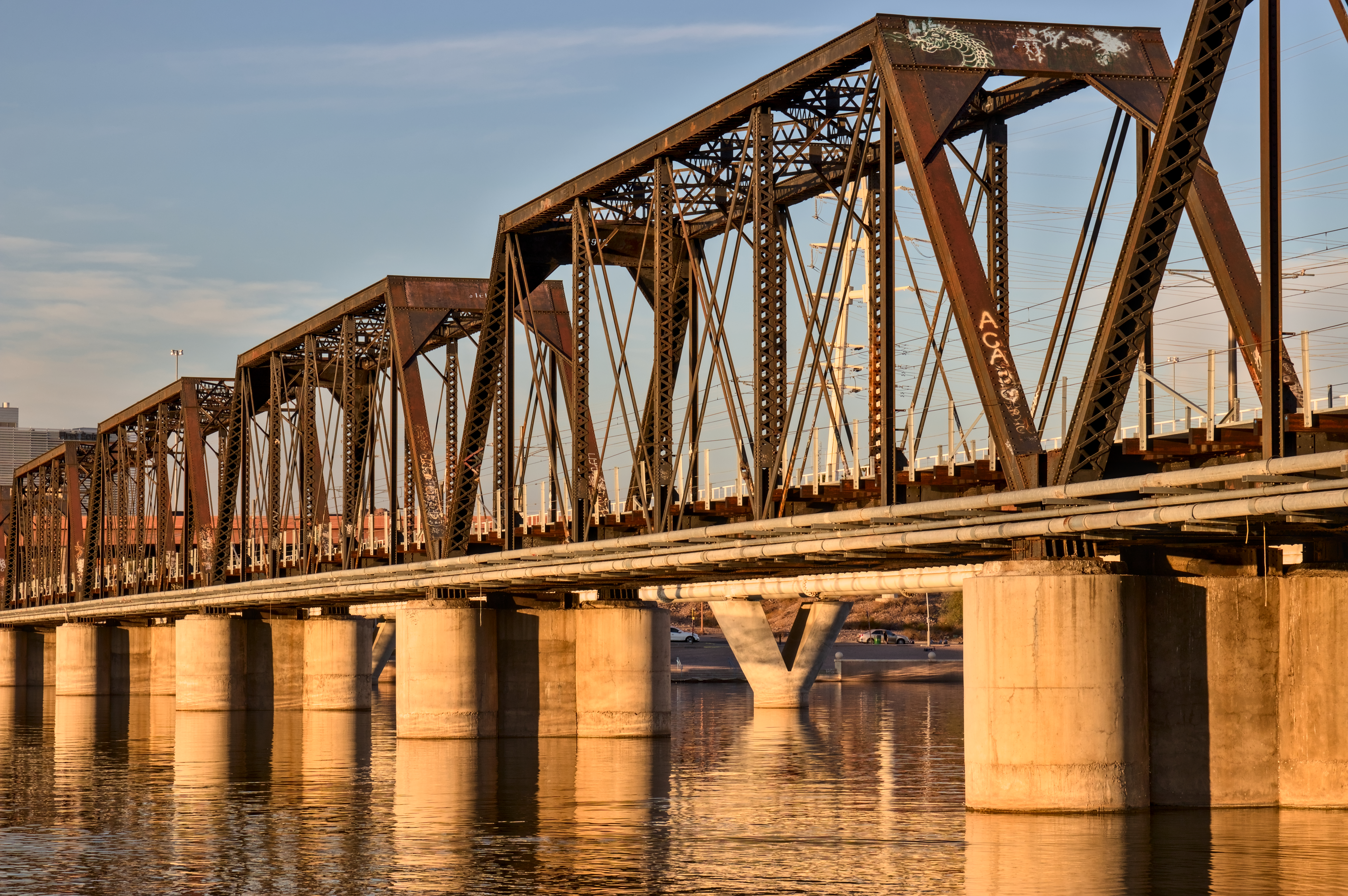
Tempe Town Lake Railroad bridge, built in 1912, from the southwest

In March 1989, Tempe adopted the Rio Salado Master Plan which represented the culmination of more than 20 years of environmental land planning. Studies of water quality and usage, the Mill Avenue Bridges and ASU recreation ensued and programming began. A groundbreaking ceremony near Tempe Beach Park marked the beginning of construction of the river channelization. The Rio Salado Master Plan showed a Town Lake concept with a continuous body of water between the north and south shores. Previously, the lake concept included islands; this concept was modified to meet the flow capacity of the river channel.

In 1995, the city added more staff to the team dedicated to the Rio Salado project and began construction of a mile long bike path along the south bank of the river. The path features public art at a number of spots along the way. The city began the Town Lake design report and completed another financial capacity study and landscape designs for portions of the parks. The next year, the consultant completed construction drawings for the Tempe Town Lake and the city designated 800 acres (3.2 km^{2}) of area including the lake as Rio Salado Park. On March 19, 1997, requests for bids were sent out for the lake construction. The city awarded contacts for construction of the lake on June 12, and groundbreaking ceremonies were held on August 8.

Water from the Central Arizona Project (CAP) started flowing into Tempe Town Lake on June 2, 1999, and by July 14, the lake was declared full. On November 7, Tempe Town Lake was opened to the public.

== Tempe Beach Park ==
Originally built in 1931, Tempe Beach Park was completely renovated in 1999 as part of the construction of Town Lake. The park connects to the five miles (8.0 km) of paths for bicycling, jogging or in-line skating that circle the lake.

=== Activities ===
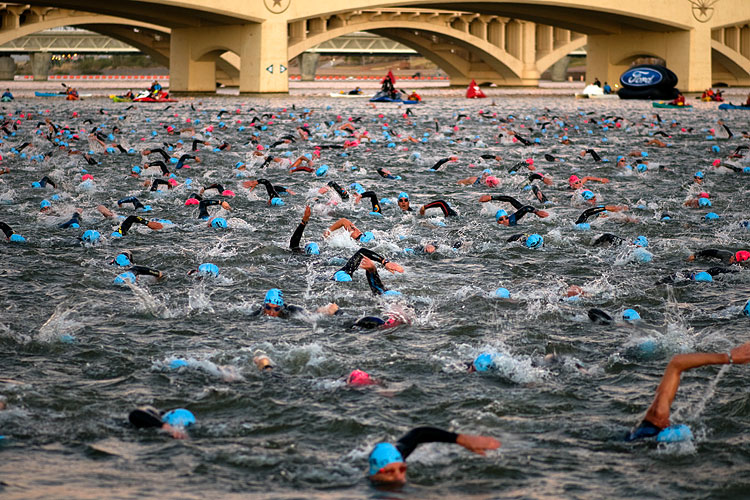
Ironman Arizona – November 23, 2008

The historic baseball field plays host to baseball and softball games, as well as carnival games.

In 2002, the $1.3 million Splash Playground was opened in Tempe Beach Park. The one-acre (4,000 m^{2}) playground was both a way for kids to have fun in the water, and to learn about the water cycle before closing in 2017. The water kept flowing across the playground, where it was eventually collected, filtered, cleaned, and re-circulated in a state-of-the-art system.

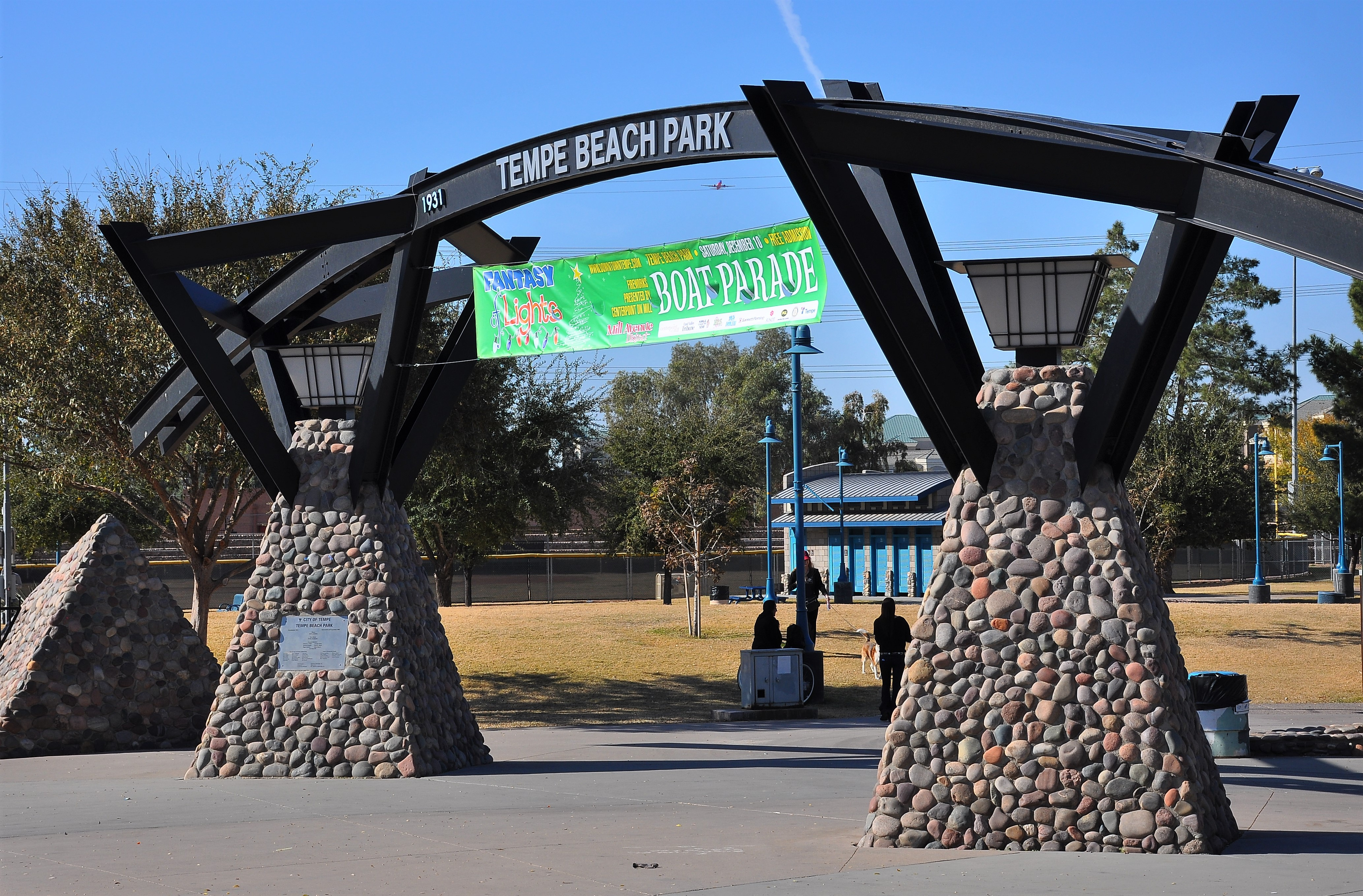
Tempe Beach Park entrance

The amphitheater accommodates 5,000 people for concerts or outdoor trade shows.

Boat Rentals of America operates its boat concession out of Tempe Beach Park.

Sailing classes are available from the Arizona Sailing Foundation, and sailing activities for all ages are available through ASF, Arizona State University Sailing Club and the Arizona Yacht Club. Private sailboat owners can launch their boats for sailing from the Tempe Town Lake Marina on the north bank of the lake. All boat owners must have permits for their boats from the City of Tempe.

Several rowing clubs practice and race on the lake, including Rio Salado Rowing Club, Arizona State University's Rowing Club, Tempe Town Lake Rowing, and Tempe Junior Crew, as well as many private owners. All boat owners must have licenses.

The Arizona Dragon Boat Association, the Gila Dragons Dragon Boat Team, Phoenix Heat Canoe Club, Dragon Riders, and Phoenix Fire Dragons, and several outrigger clubs all have their home on the lake.

Panorama of the lake

=== Events ===
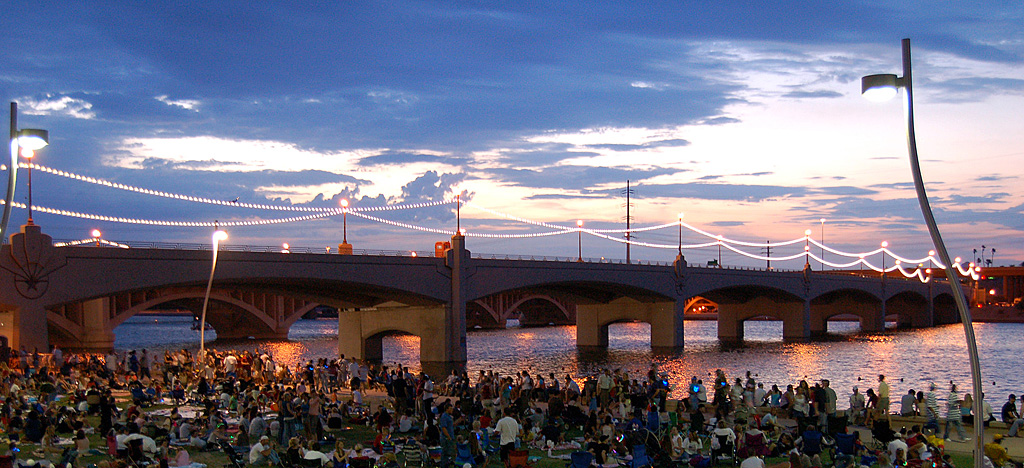
Tempe Town Lake at sunset on the Fourth of July with crowd waiting for the annual fireworks display with the Mill Avenue Bridges in the background

Annual events at Tempe Beach Park include the Fiesta Bowl New Year's Eve Block Party, Circle K Tempe Music Festival, Oktoberfest, APS Fantasy of Lights, Fourth of July fireworks show, and AVP Pro Beach Volleyball (now held in Glendale as of 2007).

There are numerous charity walks and events at Tempe Town Lake, including the AIDS Walk Arizona & 5k Run and the Walk to Save Animals.

The lake is the host of multiple triathlon events, including the Tempe International Triathlon, Life Time Tri, and Ironman Arizona Triathlon. The Ironman Arizona Triathlon each November. The 2.4-mile (3.9 km) swim portion of the race is held in Tempe town lake.

Several regattas for rowing, sailing, and dragon boating occur throughout the year. There is also the annual Rowers Triathlon, which consists of a 4,000 meter erg piece, body circuits, and a five kilometer run.

== Description ==
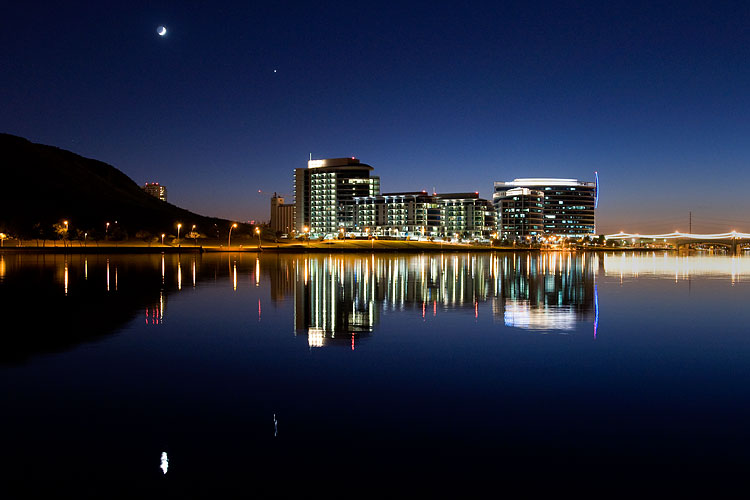
Tempe Town Lake at night, with the city's skyline in the back

The lake was completed in 1999, using inflatable rubber barriers in the riverbed to confine water within its boundaries. It is nearly two miles (3.2 km) long, with an average surface area of 224 acres (0.91 km^{2}), and an average depth of 16 feet (4.9 m), for a total average volume of 977 million US gallons (3,700,000 m^{3}). The maximum depth of the lake reaches 19 feet (5.8 m). The lake was initially filled with one billion US gallons (3,800,000 m^{3}) of water purchased from the Central Arizona Project. Evaporation and other water losses of 1.7 million US gallons (6,400 m^{3}) per day are compensated through additional purchase of CAP water, exchanges of reclaimed water, and long-term storage credits. Seepage losses are virtually nil, thanks to a system that recaptures virtually all seepage and pumps it back into the lake.

A park surrounds the area, along with office and residential highrises such as SouthBank, Grigio, Northshore Condominiums, Onyx Tower Condominiums, Rio West, Plaza Del Rio and Hayden Ferry Lakeside. The lake has fishing and boating (by permit and by day rental which can be purchased at the Tempe Public Library). The lake also hosts a small marina on the northern shore. Tempe Beach Park is home to several major annual events including Tempe's yearly Independence Day Celebrations and the Tempe Music Festival.

== Fishing ==
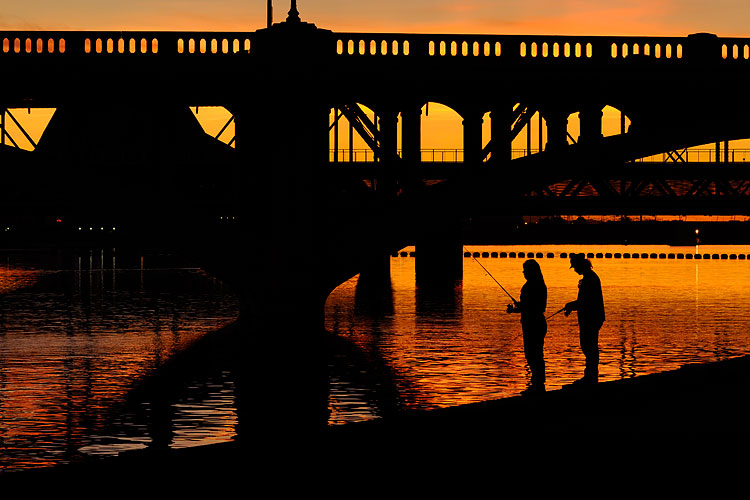
Fishing at Tempe Town Lake

Tempe Town Lake is stocked with rainbow trout on a monthly basis from November to February. Other species found in the lake naturally include largemouth bass, yellow bass, tilapia, carp, channel catfish and bluegill. An Arizona fishing license is required to fish in the lake. All motor vehicles are required to have a four stroke marine engine.

== Emergency warning system ==
To keep users of the lake safe from flash floods on the river in the mountains upstream of Tempe, high winds, lightning, other severe weather and man-made disasters, an emergency warning system was needed.

The system combines weather information, weather sensors, communications equipment, visual warnings, audible warnings, and public education to help lake users assess their personal safety and respond accordingly. The Town Lake emergency warning system (EWS) is based on three scenarios; Watch, Warning, and Evacuation.

Each of the three steel towers contains Whelen outdoor warning sirens and strobe beacons used as a warning medium. Under high wind conditions, two white strobes will flash in accordance with wind speed. The higher the wind speed, the faster the flash. If lightning is detected in the area, a sensor automatically activates a amber colored strobe, and in the event of evacuation (i.e. weather, natural disaster, man-made disaster, dam break, or other emergencies), the sirens roar in the steady "alert" tone and the red strobe is activated. Both remain active until the lake is re-opened.

Each of the towers is powered by DC voltage, through a series of attached solar panels.

The system has been in operation since November 1999 and has successfully kept the lake safe during monsoon season and various emergencies, including the 2010 dam break and the 2020 train derailment on a bridge over the lake.

== Dam ==
The prior dams were made up of three main elements:

- Strong, flexible, rubber coated fabric tube which is fixed securely to a concrete base slab by clamping bars and anchor bolts
- An operating system which controls inflation and deflation of the tube
- An automatic safety device which ensures tube deflation in flood situations

Each section of dam, or bladder, was about 240 feet (73 m) long, weighed 80,000 pounds (36 metric tons), and was more than one inch (2.5 cm) thick. At times, a small amount of water could be seen flowing over the top of the west dams, creating a 19-foot (5.8 m) waterfall. This water was then recaptured by a recirculation system and pumped back into the lake.

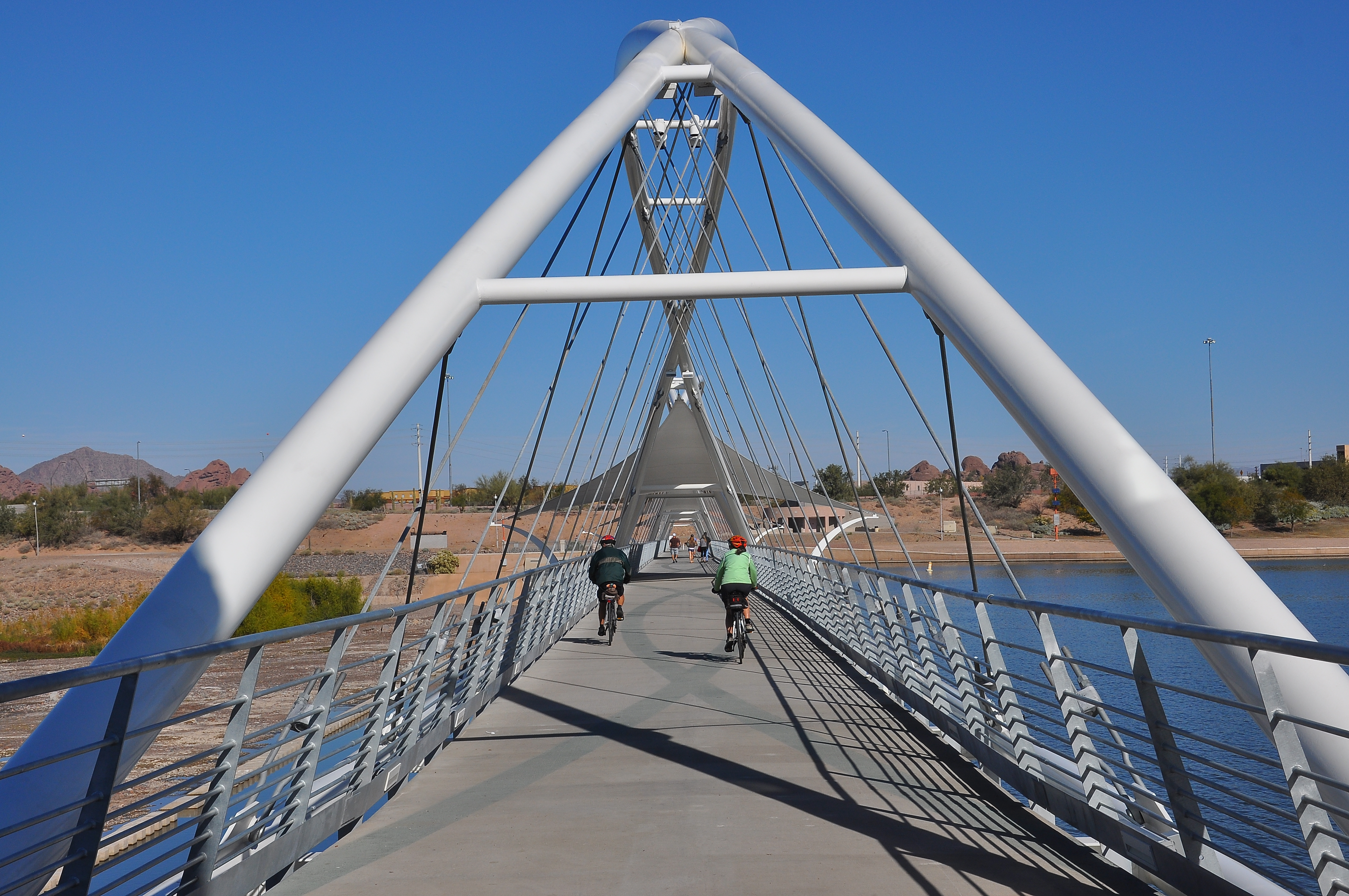
Tempe Dam Pedestrian & Bike Bridge

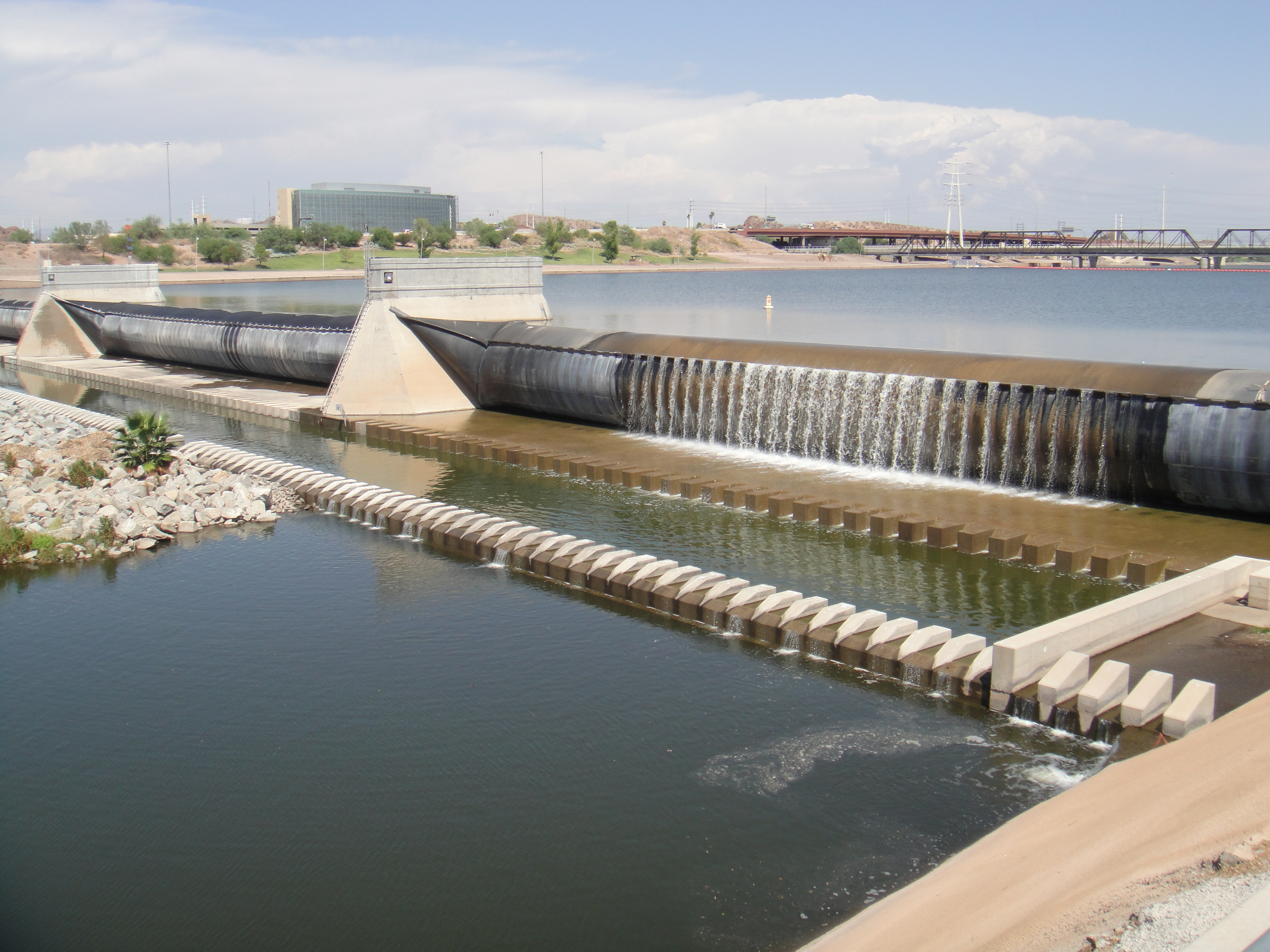
View of the West Dam holding back the lake

The east dams were five feet (1.5 m) high and sat on a two-foot (61 cm) concrete base. The west dams were 16 feet (4.9 m) high and sat on a three-foot (91 cm) base.

Tempe's old dams were computer controlled to maintain air pressure of six pounds per square inch (41 kPa). They could be controlled individually to within 1/2 inch (13 mm) and could be lowered incrementally depending on the flood conditions. Due to rapid deterioration of the west dams, the City of Tempe had worked out an agreement to replace them with manufacturer Bridgestone. Replacement costs were expected to reach $2.5 million USD. Work was scheduled to begin in the spring of 2010 in conjunction with a new $6.3 million USD pedestrian bridge that will cross over the tops of the west dams. However, due to the high amount of rainfall in the winter and upstream runoff in the spring, the project had been postponed until July.

In 2014 Tempe began work on a new dam 100 feet (30 m) west of the dam in place at the time. Construction was completed in the spring of 2016. The dam features seven steel gates, the largest of their kind in the world at over 100 feet (30 m) long and weighing 230,000 pounds (100 metric tons).

=== Dam break ===
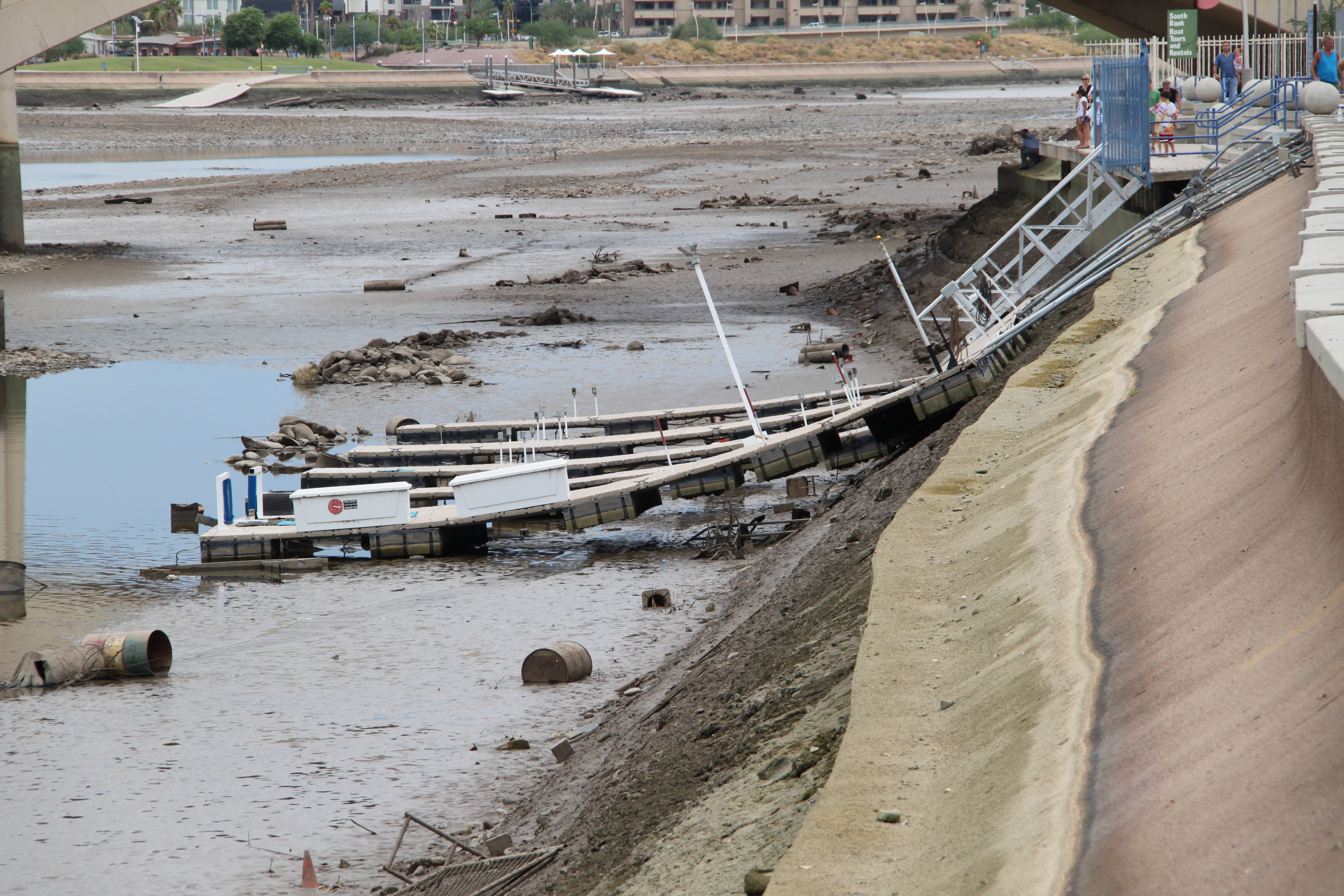
The collapse of the lake's west dam drained the lake into the Salt River, exposing debris and trash under the area that the lake used to occupy.

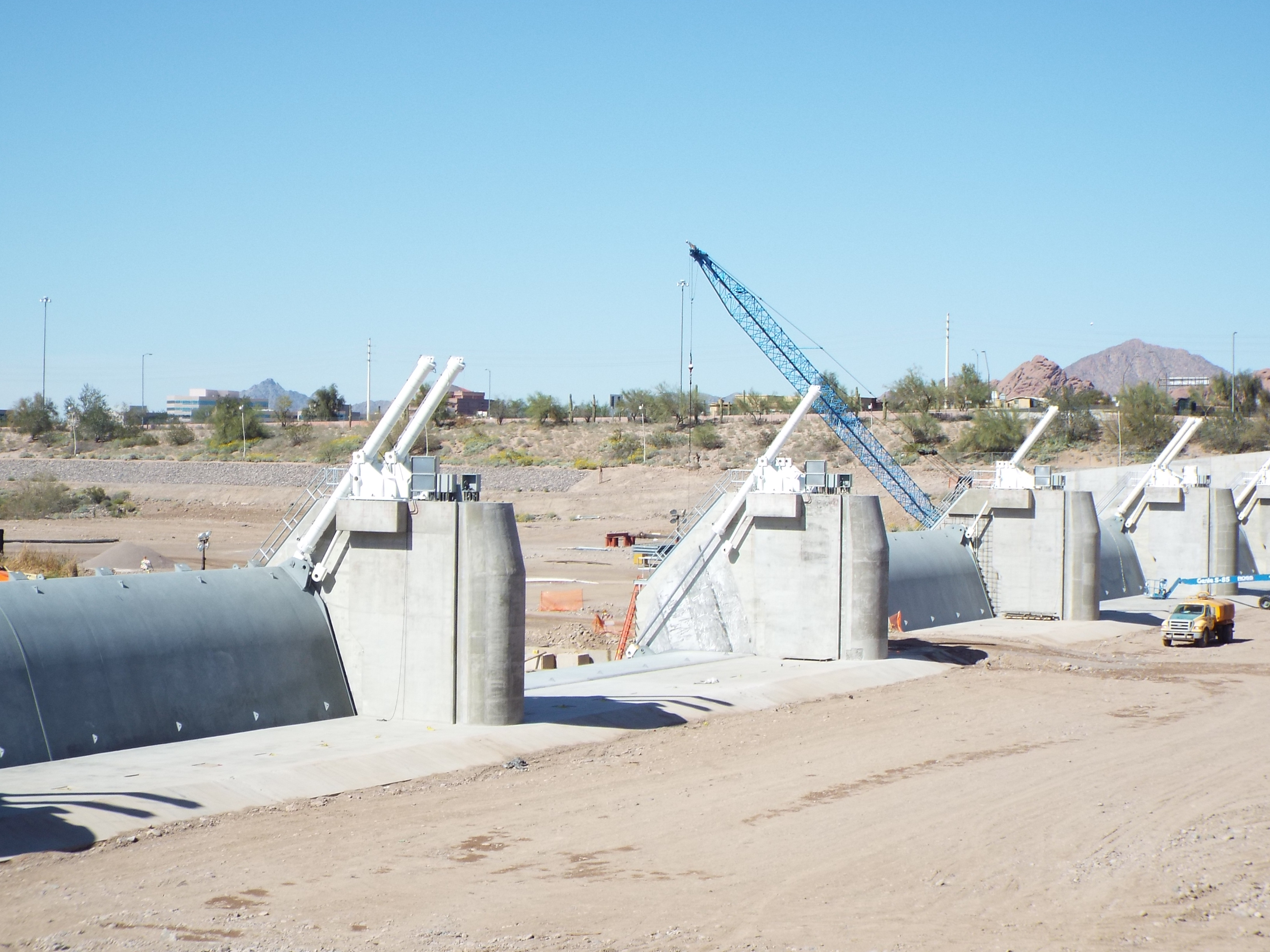
The new Tempe Lake West Dam during its construction in 2016

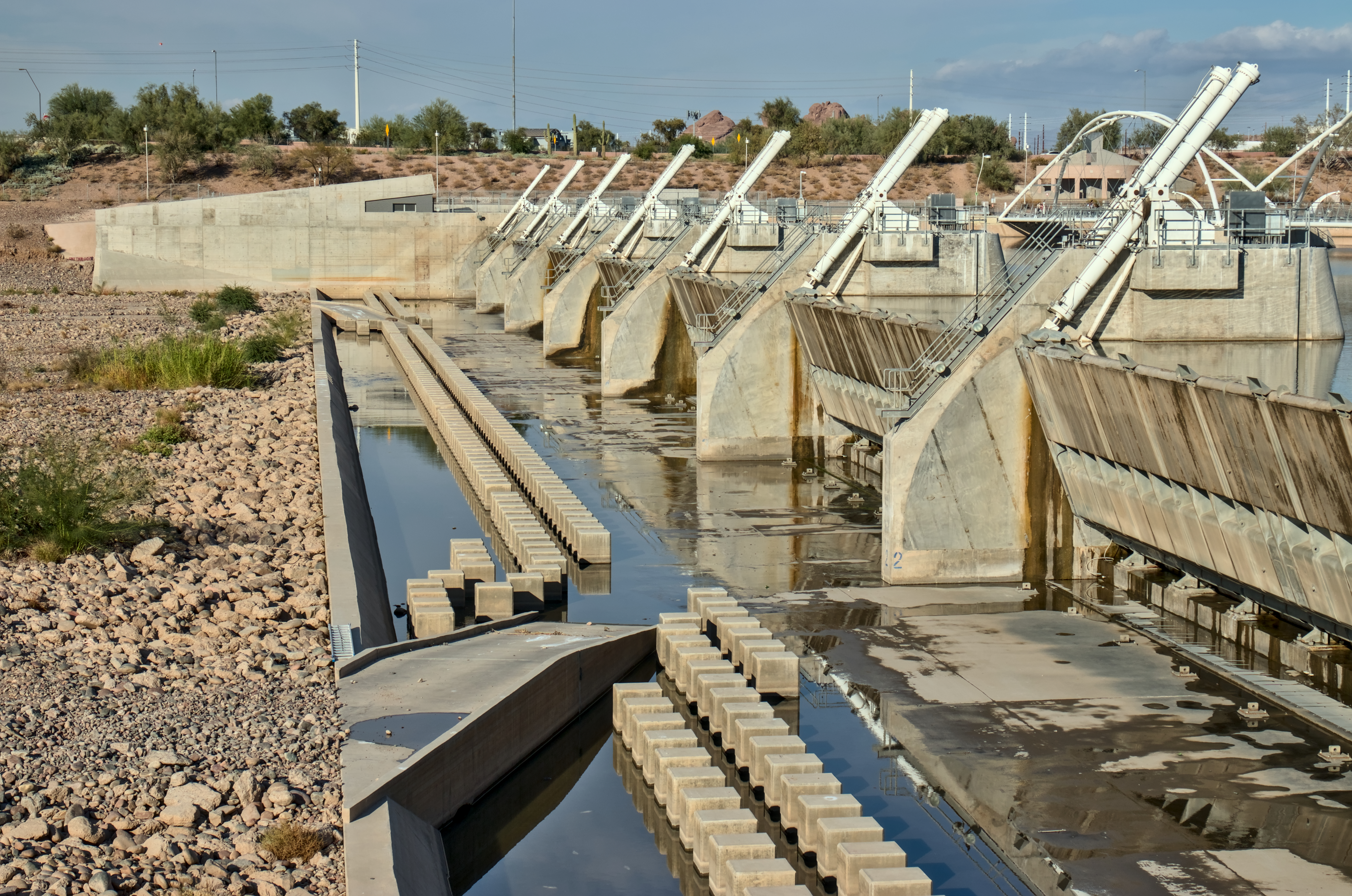
The completed Tempe Town Lake Dam from the southwest

At approximately 9:45 pm MST on July 20, 2010, one section of the inflatable dam on the west end burst, thus releasing water up to 15,000 cubic feet per second (420 m^{3}/s) into the normally dry Salt River bed. The lake began draining immediately. Emergency workers rushed to clear the area and the lake's outdoor warning sirens started wailing, both within minutes. By the next morning the lake had lost about three fourths of its normal water. The dam breach left some areas of the lake with three feet of water or less; the average lake depth is about 16 feet (4.9 m). Most of the 10,000 fish in the lake were swept downstream, but those that remained were expected to die within five days; fishing was not expected to resume until a year after the lake refilled.

City officials indicated that they expected to reopen the lake by November 1, and that if the lake was reopened by then, the dam collapse's economic impact would be "fairly light." The city indicated that replacements for two of the remaining bladders had already been delivered and would be installed as soon as possible. The replacement for the failed section was delivered to Tempe by the middle of August. The city built a cofferdam to allow the lake to be refilled while the northernmost bladder was replaced at a later date.

Some of the fish that had temporarily survived the dam break and were left stranded in shallow pools of water in the lake bed were scooped out and fed to a captive six-foot-long (1.8 m) alligator in the parking lot of the Tempe Center for the Arts on Friday, July 23. Most of the fish removed from the lake were to be fed to other denizens of the Phoenix Herpetological Society, where the alligator has lived since 2005.

On October 8, 2010, SRP crews began refilling the lake. Water used to refill the lake was brought down the Salt River reservoir system from Roosevelt Lake east of the Phoenix area. Tempe officials chose to use a portion of their allotment of Lake water since the Lake was filled to capacity at the time. This method saved the city hundreds of thousands of dollars versus the alternative of filling it with Colorado River water from the CAP. After about two and a half weeks, the lake was reopened for normal water activities on October 26, 2010.

== Notable water releases ==
The Salt River bed in the Phoenix metropolitan area is often either dry or flowing to a trickle, with the river's water being entirely diverted to agricultural and other uses upriver. Since Tempe Town Lake uses artificial structures and the natural riverbed to form the lake, the inflatable dams confining the lake must be lowered in periods of high runoff to permit the passage of the Salt River itself. The lake has released water on multiple occasions as the river levels rise normally due to heavy rain or winter snow runoff.

On December 31, 2004, the eastern dam was lowered for the first time since its construction. Heavy rains in the Salt River watershed required the release of 20,000 cubic feet (570 m^{3}) of water per second into the Salt River. The dams are designed to handle a maximum flow of 64,000 cubic feet per second (1,800 m^{3}/s). Additional releases occurred in February 2005, January 2008, and February 2009.

== Tempe Town Lake Bridge ==
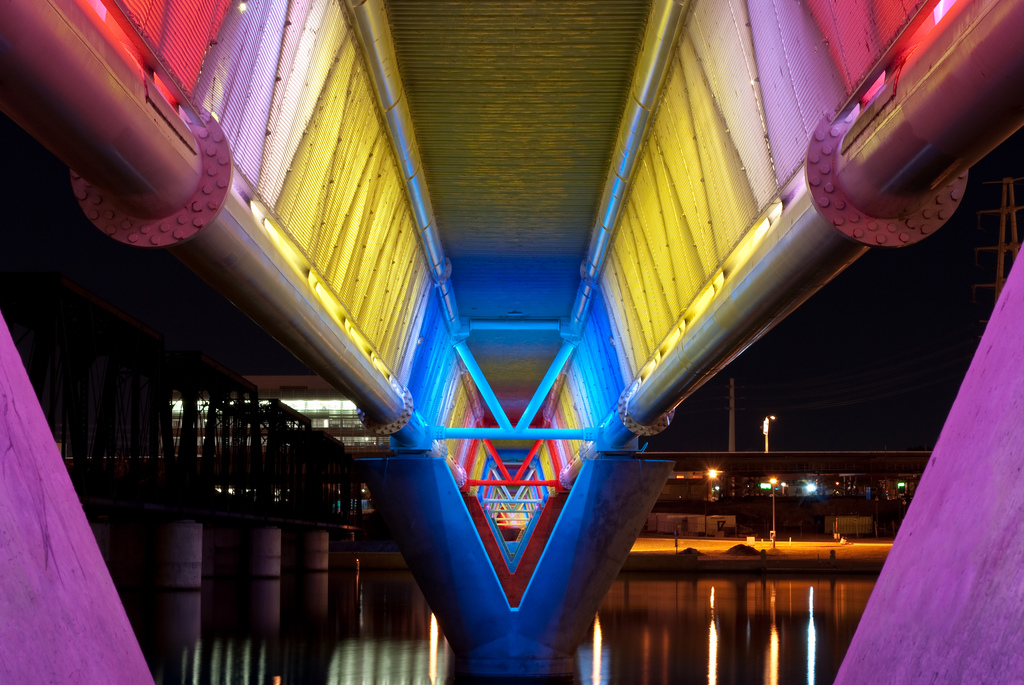
Tempe Town Lake Valley Metro Rail Bridge

The Valley Metro Rail project began building this bridge (designed by T. Y. Lin International) over Tempe Town Lake, starting in the first quarter of 2005. The lighting ceremony for the bridge, which was the celebration for the completion of the most important parts of the bridge, was held on Saturday, December 9, 2006 during the APS Fantasy of Lights Boat Parade. The project was completed as of December 27, 2008, when the light rail line was officially opened to the public. The LED light display that occurs each time a train passes overhead at dark casts varying colors onto the lake, increasing the aesthetic quality of the bridge at night.

== See also ==
- Mill Avenue
