= U.S. Route 95 in Arizona =

Section of United States Numbered Highway in Arizona

U.S. Route 95
- US 95 highlighted in red

Route information
- Maintained by ADOT, Yuma County, City of Yuma, City of Somerton and City of San Luis
- Length: 123.36 mi (198.53 km) Includes overlap of 19.17 miles (30.85 km) with I-10 and I-10 BL
- Existed: June 27, 1960–present
- History: Established as SR 95 in 1936

Major junctions
- South end: Calle 1 to Fed. 2 at the Mexican border in San Luis
- I-8 in Yuma; I-10 / SR 95 in Quartzsite
- North end: I-10 / US 95 at the California state line in Ehrenberg

Location
- Country: United States
- State: Arizona
- Counties: Yuma, La Paz

Highway system
- United States Numbered Highway System; List; Special; Divided; Arizona State Highway System; Interstate; US; State; Scenic Proposed; Former
← SR 93	→ SR 95

U.S. Route 95 (US 95) is a major U.S. Highway in the American state of Arizona. Starting at the Mexican border in San Luis, US 95 acts as the main highway north through Gadsden, Somerton and Yuma before arriving in Quartzsite. Between Quartzsite and the California border on the Colorado River in Ehrenberg, US 95 runs entirely concurrent with I-10. Part of US 95 between San Luis and Yuma is maintained by local governments instead of the Arizona Department of Transportation, which maintains the remainder of the route.

US 95 is one of Arizona's younger U.S. Highways, having been established in the state on June 27, 1960. In earlier years, the Arizona section of US 95 was a southern extension of Arizona State Route 95. The route between Quartzsite and San Luis was also the first segment of SR 95 to be commissioned by the Arizona State Highway Department. US 95 used to have major junctions with US 80 in Yuma and US 60/US 70 in Quartzsite, until all three routes were removed from southwestern Arizona between 1969 and 1982.

== Route description ==
U.S. Route 95 (US 95) begins at the United States Customs and Immigration checkpoint station on the Mexican border in San Luis, Arizona. From there, the route proceeds north to Urtuzuastegui Street, where it becomes a one-way pair around downtown San Luis. US 95 northbound takes Urtuzuastegui Street to William Brooks Avenue to D Street to Main Street, while southbound US 95 takes Archibald Street from Main Street to Urtuzuastegui Street. The original alignment through the downtown district of San Luis, Main Street, is now maintained by the city of San Luis. On the north end of downtown, Cesar Chavez Boulevard provides direct access to Arizona State Route 195 (SR 195). Continuing north from San Luis, US 95 enters the rural landscape of southwestern Yuma County. The highway goes almost perfectly straight north, paralleling the Colorado River and international border to Gadsden. Through Gadsden, US 95 is called Main Street. Immediately north of Gadsden, US 95 curves east, then north a second time, curving east again at the Horn Lateral Irrigation Canal. US 95 becomes Main Street again as it passes through Somerton. On the east side of Somerton, US 95 angles to the northeast for short distance, before turning straight north at County 15th Street. Entering Yuma, US 95 becomes South Avenue B and continues to a junction with West 16th Street, where it heads east. At 4th Avenue, US 95 intersects with the Interstate 8 Business Loop (I-8 Business) at a signaled intersection. I-8 Business acts as both the main street through Yuma and a section of Historic US 80.

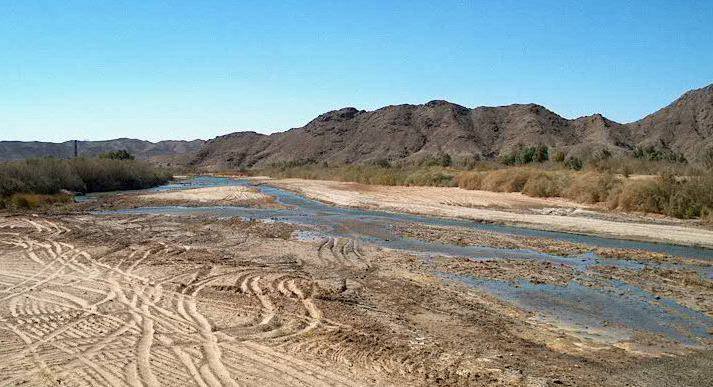
The Gila River as seen from US 95 near Yuma.

East of I-8 Business, US 95 crosses over the Union Pacific Railroad on an overpass before arriving at a diamond interchange with Interstate 8 (I-8). US 95 continues east of the interchange to Araby Road, where state maintenance of the route takes over. After passing the main campus of Arizona Western College, US 95 curves north through Blaisdell and exits the Yuma metropolitan area. Near Dome, US 95 intersects with an early alignment of the old main highway between Yuma and Phoenix, before crossing the Gila River over a bridge. To the west of the Gila River bridge lies the abandoned McPhaul Suspension Bridge, which once carried US 95 over the Gila River until it was replaced in 1968 by the current US 95 bridge and routing. US 95 continues north through the Yuma Proving Ground, passing the access road for the Laguna Dam, the Laguna Army Airfield, and the General Motors Desert Proving Ground. US 95 straddles the line between Yuma County and La Paz County through some small mountains, passing a United States Border Patrol checkpoint before permanently entering La Paz County and La Paz Valley. Entering Quartzsite, US 95 becomes Central Boulevard and passes under I-10, arriving at a signaled intersection with I-10 Bus. and the southern terminus of SR 95 at Main Street. SR 95 continues north on Central Boulevard to Lake Havasu City which is home to the London Bridge, while US 95 heads left onto Main Street. At I-10 Exit 17, US 95 joins the interstate and runs concurrent with I-10 west out of Quartzsite. US 95 runs entirely concurrent with I-10 past Exit 11 at Dome Rock Road, Exit 5 at Morgantown and a weigh station before entering Ehrenberg. After passing Exit 1 for the Ehrenberg–Parker Highway, both US 95 and I-10 continue across the Colorado River bridge into Blythe, California.

== History ==
U.S. Route 95 was a late addition to Arizona's U.S. Highway system, having been extended into the state around 1960 during the dawn of the Interstate Highway System. Though it is a short section of highway, only traveling between Ehrenberg and San Luis at the Mexico–United States border, it also serves as the main north–south highway to the cities of Yuma, San Luis, and Quartzsite. The history of US 95 in Arizona dates back to 1936, when it was first established as Arizona State Route 95 and to a network of territorial era wagon roads.

=== Background ===
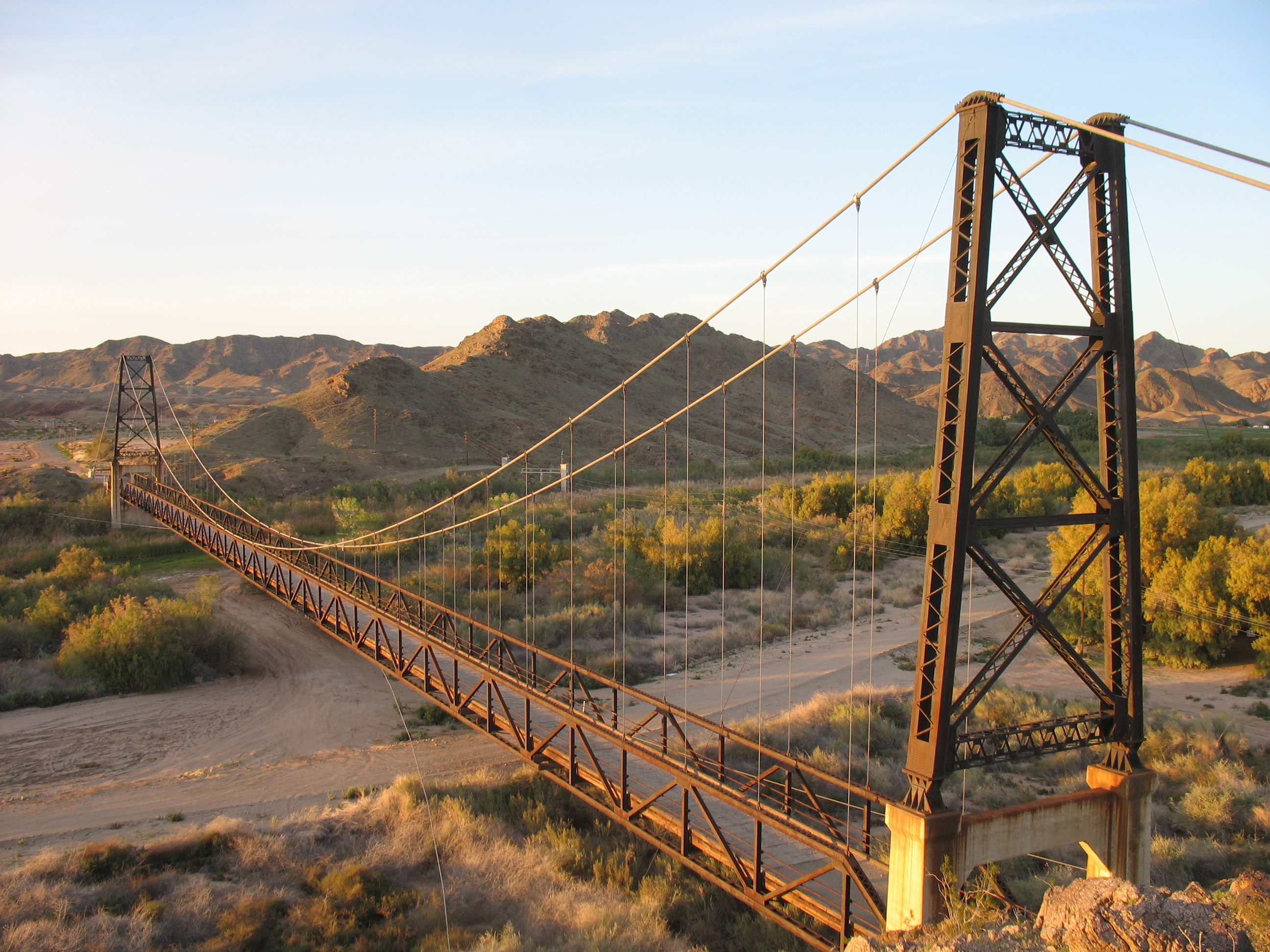
The McPhaul Suspension Bridge carried SR 95, later US 95, across the Gila River between 1936 and 1968.

The history of U.S. Route 95 in Arizona dates back to a network of primitive wagon roads between Quartzsite and San Luis. By 1925, the wagon road between San Luis and Yuma had become a fully paved county road with a gravel road connecting the paved road in Yuma to Araby. A graded dirt county road had also been constructed over some of the old wagon roads between Dome and Quartzsite. In 1928, the Arizona State Highway Department contracted the Levy Construction Company of Denver, Colorado to construct a new suspension bridge across the Gila River on the county road between Dome and Quartzsite. Construction began the same year and was completed in 1929. The new McPhaul Suspension Bridge not only carried the county road over the river but replaced the older more destruction prone Antelope Hill Highway Bridge upstream. The Antelope Hill Bridge was constantly destroyed by Gila River flooding and had to be reconstructed every time a major flood occurred. This made the county road and the McPhaul Bridge the primary north to south crossing of the Gila River in Yuma County. By 1935, the county road from Dome to Quartzsite was still unpaved.

The road between Dome and Araby had more historical significance, once being a section of the Gila Trail and later Cooke's Wagon Road. This was a route extensively used by Native Americans, Spanish missionaries, United States Army personnel during the Mexican–American War, and prospectors heading to California during the 1848 gold rush. It was this same section between Araby and Dome that was first maintained by the Arizona government during the territorial days as part of the East–West Territorial Road. Following statehood, the old territorial road had become part of the new Borderland Highway. This new highway was one of Arizona's first state highways. After the passage of the Federal Aid Highway Act of 1921, the western section of the Borderland Highway was renamed the Yuma–Phoenix Highway. On November 11, 1926, the Phoenix–Yuma Highway became part of the U.S. Highway System. Thus, U.S. Route 80 became the first U.S. Highway designation over what is now Arizona's section of US 95. However, the time period in which the highway from Araby to Dome was designated as US 80 was short lived. In 1928, US 80 was moved onto a shorter newly constructed alignment through Telegraph Pass. As such, Araby to Dome highway reverted to a county road. The road between Ehrenberg and Quartzsite, also previously served by unmaintained wagon roads, became a graded dirt county road by 1925. On September 9, 1927, this county road became part of the newly designated Arizona State Route 74 (SR 74). On June 8, 1931, SR 74 was replaced by US 60, when the latter highway was extended through Arizona to Los Angeles, California. What had started out as a simple county road between the Colorado River and Quartzsite was now the main highway from Los Angeles to Phoenix.

=== Establishment of Route 95 ===
Historical SR 95 and US 95 route markers

1927 design

1941 design

1956 design

1960 design (Southbound)

1960 design (Northbound)

1963 design

1971 design (used after 1991)

On May 26, 1936, the paved county road through San Luis and Somerton to US 80 in Yuma was taken over by the Arizona State Highway Department and designated as State Route 95 (SR 95). On June 20, 1938, the county roads between US 80 in Yuma and Quartzsite became part of a northern extension of SR 95 to SR 72 in Bouse. Now a fully maintained state route, SR 95 was one of several highways funded by the Works Progress Administration (WPA) projects during the Great Depression. More specifically, the section of SR 95 between Yuma and Somerton was the part of the highway improved by the WPA. In 1938, the highway between San Luis and Yuma was widened, while the highway between Yuma and Quartzsite was heavily rebuilt and realigned. By 1939, all the unpaved sections of SR 95 had been surfaced with gravel and oiled down. In July 1939, the Yuma County Board of Supervisors passed a resolution to pave SR 95 between US 80 and the McPhaul Bridge. The state followed up with the county resolution by putting out construction bids to pave this section of the highway. The contract was awarded to the Lewis Brothers of Phoenix on December 15 at a price of $68,898. The paving project was completed between the McPhaul Bridge and Yuma in 1940. The pavement had been extended northward from the McPhaul Bridge to the Yuma Proving Grounds by 1942. During the rest of World War II, no further improvements were made to SR 95 and the highway remained unaltered by war's end in 1946.

Improvement of SR 95 re-commenced on July 29, 1949, when a contract was awarded to two separate private contractors repave part of the highway 35 miles (56 km) north of Yuma. On January 18, 1951, SR 95 was re-routed away from an older routing from US 80 down 10th Street over the Southern Pacific Railroad down a route with many twists and turns to a new alignment from US 80 along 16th Street south of downtown to an intersection with the old alignment. At the time, 16th Street served the old Panther Field airport and the Silver Spur Rodeo Grounds. The new alignment was built by the Johnson Construction Company of Tucson at a cost of $88,168. The older route was handed over to Yuma County. Also by 1951, the remainder of SR 95 between the Yuma Proving Grounds and Quartzite had been fully paved. Due to the very indirect route of SR 95 west of US 80, Yuma County constructed and paved an extension of 16th Street between US 80 and SR 95. The 16th Street extension and shortcut opened on July 8, 1953. On June 27, 1960, U.S. Route 95 was extended into Arizona from Blythe, California to Quartzsite, Arizona via US 60/US 70 through Ehrenberg. US 95 then replaced all of SR 95 between Quartzsite and San Luis. The US 95 extension had been requested by both California and Arizona earlier that year and approved by the American Association of State Highway Officials. On April 21, 1965, US 95 was re-routed on the west side of Yuma between Avenue B and US 80 from its older alignment to a straighter alignment down the western segment of 16th Street. Before 1965, US 95 (and earlier SR 95) had gone a few blocks further north on Avenue B to 1st Street, where it turned south sharing a wrong way concurrency with US 80 down 4th Avenue to 16th Street. In 1968, the McPhaul Bridge was replaced by a newer replacement bridge. Rather than be abandoned to the county, the approaches to the bridge and bridge itself were completely abandoned. Despite the fact it no longer carries traffic, the McPhaul Bridge is still standing today. On August 13, 1981, the historic suspension bridge was added to the National Register of Historic Places.

=== Later changes ===
On February 13, 1969, the US 70 designation was removed from the highway between Ehrenberg and Quartzsite and truncated to Globe. This left US 60 and US 95 the only remaining U.S. Highways on the route. By 1971, US 60 and US 95 between Quartzsite and Ehrenberg had been rebuilt into a freeway and was now also signed as Interstate 10, save for a small section beginning at the east end of Ehrenberg and traveling over the Colorado River and the main street through Quartzsite. On May 24, 1974, US 60 through Quartzsite, including the western section concurrent with US 95, was designated I-10 Business. Between 1977 and 1978, US 80 had been truncated further east to Benson with I-8 Business taking its place as the major highway junction with US 95 in Yuma. In 1982, US 60 was truncated to Brenda and the designation removed from the I-10/US 95 overlap. On November 16, 1984, the Arizona Department of Transportation (ADOT) took ownership of several city streets in San Luis and established the US 95 Truck route between the San Luis border crossing and US 95 at the southern end of downtown San Luis.

Following the interstate construction, there were no major changes to US 95 until the early 21st Century. Most of US 95 from the north end of downtown San Luis to Araby Road east of Yuma was given up by ADOT in stages. On February 20, 2009, maintenance and ownership of US 95 through Somerton was handed over to the town itself. This was followed by the transfer of US 95 to the city of San Luis from G Street and Juan Sanchez Boulevard to County 22nd Street on March 19, 2010. On July 16, 2010, ADOT gave up ownership of US 95 from 32nd Street to Araby Road to the city of Yuma. Lastly on November 19, 2010, whatever sections of US 95 were still owned by ADOT between Yuma and downtown San Luis were transferred to different local jurisdictions depending on the location of each section. Despite the fact ADOT no longer owns US 95 between Yuma and San Luis, the designation is still recognized along the abandoned route. Today, ADOT maintains a different state highway between Araby Road and San Luis, known as State Route 195. In 2015, US 95 Truck in San Luis was retired from the State Highway System, after US 95 was re-routed through downtown. Between D Street and Urtuzuastegu Street, US 95 was removed from Main Street. Northbound US 95 was re-routed down 1st Avenue and D Street (former US 95 Truck) while southbound US 95 was re-routed down Archibald Street and Urtuzuastegu Street. As of December 31, 2020, the most recent ADOT State Highway System Log no longer lists any section of US 95 between I-8 and San Luis within the state highway inventory, suggesting all of US 95's southernmost section is now locally owned and maintained.

== Major intersections ==
County	Location	mi	km	Exit	Destinations	Notes
Yuma	San Luis	0.00	0.00		Calle Uno	San Luis Port of Entry; continuation beyond international border with Mexico
Yuma	San Luis	0.56	0.90		Cesar Chavez Boulevard to SR 195 north	Future SR 195
Yuma	Yuma	23.03	37.06		Fourth Avenue (BL 8 / Historic US 80)	Former US 80
Yuma	Yuma	23.96	38.56		South end state maintenance	
Yuma	Yuma	23.96– 24.09	38.56– 38.77		I-8 – Phoenix, Tucson, San Diego	I-8 exit 2
Yuma	Yuma	24.09	38.77		North end state maintenance	
Yuma		29.08	46.80		Araby Road	South end state maintenance
La Paz	Quartzsite	104.19 18.96	167.68 30.51		SR 95 north (Central Boulevard north) / BL 10 east (Main Street east) to I-10 east – Parker, Phoenix	Mileposts change to reflect I-10 BL mileage; southern end of I-10 BL concurrency; southern terminus of SR 95; I-10 BL is former US 60 / US 70
La Paz	Quartzsite	18.92	30.45		North end state maintenance	
La Paz	Quartzsite	17.67	28.44		South end state maintenance	
La Paz	Quartzsite	17.53 17.54	28.21 28.23		Quartzsite Boulevard south (BL 10 west) I-10 east – Phoenix	Milepost change to reflect I-10 mileage; northern end of I-10 BL concurrency; southern end of I-10 concurrency
La Paz		11.99	19.30	11	Dome Rock Road	Exit numbers follow I-10
La Paz	Ehrenberg	5.87	9.45	5	Tom Wells Road	Exit numbers follow I-10
La Paz	Ehrenberg	0.72	1.16	1	Ehrenberg, Parker	Exit numbers follow I-10
Colorado River		0.00	0.00	Arizona–California line		
Colorado River		0.00	0.00		I-10 west / US 95 north – Los Angeles	Continuation into Blythe, California
1.000 mi = 1.609 km; 1.000 km = 0.621 mi: Concurrency terminus

== See also ==
U.S. Route 95
Previous state: Terminus	Arizona	Next state: California
