= Antelope Hill Highway Bridge =

Historic bridge in Yuma County, Arizona

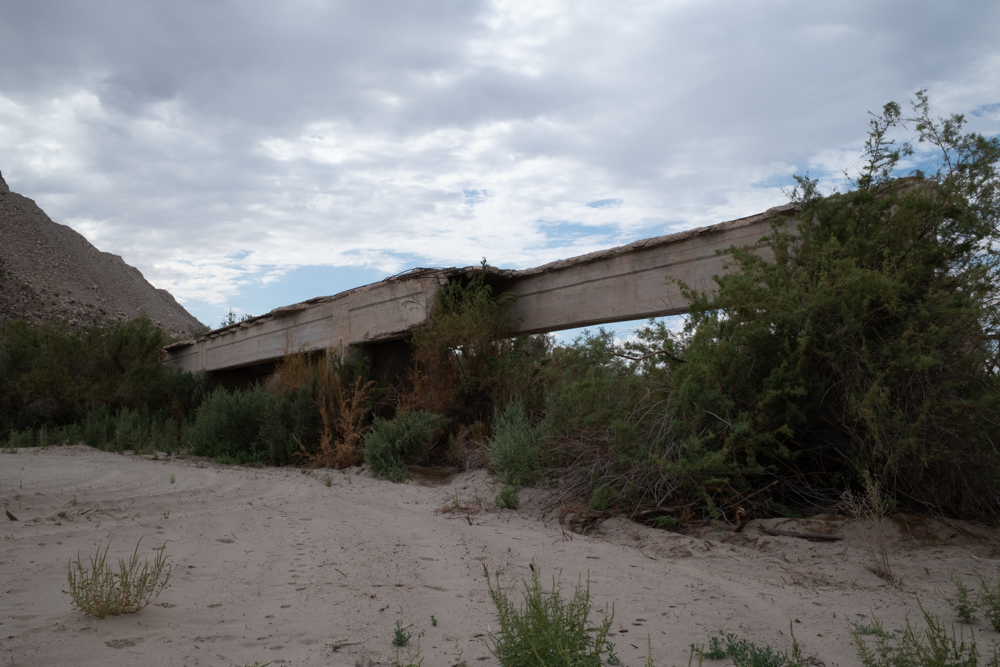
- The ruins of the old bridge in 2025
- Coordinates: 32°43′8″N 114°0′43″W
- Carried: Ocean to Ocean Highway (formerly)
- Crossed: Gila River
- Locale: Yuma County, Arizona
- Named for: Antelope Hill, Arizona
- Owner: Yuma County

Characteristics
- Design: Twin concrete girder multi-span bridge
- Material: Concrete
- Pier construction: Timber
- Total length: 975 feet (297 m)
- Width: 18 feet (5 m)
- Traversable?: No
- Longest span: 65 feet (20 m)
- No. of spans: 15

History
- Architect: Lamar Cobb
- Constructed by: Perry Borchers (initially); Arizona Highway Department aided by Arizona State Penitentiary convict labor (Winter 1914 onward)
- Construction start: 1914
- Construction end: 1915
- Opened: 18 August 1915
- Rebuilt: 1917; 1918
- Collapsed: After 1929
- Closed: 1929
- Replaced by: Gillespie Dam Bridge; McPhaul Suspension Bridge
- Antelope Hill Highway Bridge
- U.S. National Register of Historic Places
- Location within Arizona Location within the United States
- Nearest city: Tacna, Arizona
- Coordinates: 32°43′8″N 114°0′43″W
- Area: 0.4 acres (0.16 ha)
- Built: 1914 to 1915
- Built by: Perry E. Borchers (started); Arizona State Highway Department (finished) with Arizona State Penitentiary convict laborers
- Architectural style: Concrete Girder
- MPS: Vehicular Bridges in Arizona MPS
- NRHP reference No.: 79003444
- Added to NRHP: June 28, 1979

Location
- Interactive map of Antelope Hill Highway Bridge

The Antelope Hill Highway Bridge (also known as the Antelope Hill Bridge) is a historic bridge over the Gila River in Tacna, Arizona, U.S. It was built between 1914 and 1915 as a ten-span concrete girder bridge. The bridge served as an integral piece of the Ocean to Ocean Highway between Yuma and Phoenix from 1915 to 1922, when it was bypassed by an alternate route through Gila Bend, paralleling the Gillespie Dam. The bridge and original highway were bypassed mainly due to damage caused by flooding along the river floodplain it was constructed on. After being repurposed for traffic traveling north from Yuma, the bridge was finally abandoned in 1929 following completion of the McPhaul Suspension Bridge. The ruins of the old bridge are currently listed on the National Register of Historic Places.

== History ==
In 1912, Arizona state engineer Lamar Cobb surveyed two different locations to construct an auto bridge over the Gila River. One location was near the town of Dome while the other was located further east along the river at the base of Antelope Hill. Cobb chose the latter as the preferred site for a new bridge. In 1913, engineers working within Cobb's office designed a multiple span concrete girder bridge, with the concrete sections measuring 1,000 feet (305 m) in length. This did not include the length of the approach spans to be constructed of timber trestle structures. The longest single-span would measure 65 feet (20 m) long. In total, the new bridge would have 15 separate spans. Guard rails on the bridge would be constructed from steel piping.

Cobb opened competitive bidding for the bridge in December 1913. However, the state initially rejected every bid, wishing to use prison labor to construct the bridge instead of contracted labor. The bridge had to be redesigned when Cobb calculated there wasn't an adequate amount of manpower in the Arizona prison system to match the project's size. Having reworked his original plans, Cobb once again opened the project to competitive bidding, awarding the contract to an individual named Parry Borchers in 1914. Construction began in June 1914 but stopped soon afterward due to Borchers defaulting on his loans. Several months later, a winter flood badly damaged the incomplete structure. Borchers' failure to complete the project resulted in the state taking over construction and completing the bridge using prison labor. The Antelope Hill Highway Bridge was finally opened to traffic on August 18, 1915. The event was marked with a celebratory gala picnic attended by thousands of individuals.

The bridge was originally part of the main highway between Yuma and Phoenix, known as the Ocean to Ocean Highway. The route also carried several auto trails such as the Dixie Overland Highway, Bankhead Highway and Old Spanish Trail. It was partly rebuilt in 1917-1918 after the 1916 flood washed away the northern approach to the bridge; the modification added five more concrete spans and a wooden trestle. Washouts and destruction of the bridge by flooding were common due to its placement on a weak soil area along the Gila River floodplain. Damage to the bridge came to be expected every time a major flood event occurred on the lower Gila River. Two particularly large floods in November 1919 and February 1920 not only damaged the bridge but completely submerged it as well as washed out a large section of the highway it served. This led to the Arizona Highway Department deciding to construct an entirely different route to bypass the floodplain altogether. In 1922, construction of an alternate route through Gila Bend was completed. The new route crossed the Gila River with a concrete apron at the foot of the Gillespie Dam. The apron itself would be replaced five years later by the new Gillespie Dam Bridge. This effectively ended the purpose for which the Antelope Hill Highway Bridge was constructed. The alternate route became the new main highway to Phoenix and was designated as part of U.S. Route 80 in 1926. US 80 would later be replaced by Interstate 8.

Despite no longer being the main route between Yuma and Phoenix, the Antelope Hill Highway Bridge was still utilized as the main route for traffic traveling north from Yuma. However, costly flood damage continued, causing the Antelope Hill Highway Bridge to be completely abandoned in 1929. It was subsequently replaced by the McPhaul Suspension Bridge as the main north–south auto connection from Yuma. The new bridge later became part of U.S. Route 95 before being abandoned itself. Despite total abandonment, the Antelope Hill Highway Bridge has been listed on the National Register of Historic Places since June 28, 1979. Where the replacement McPhaul Bridge and Gillespie Dam Bridge are still intact, the years of flood damage and abandonment have left what remains of the Antelope Hill Highway Bridge in ruins. The Antelope Hill Highway Bridge remains can still be accessed by foot from Roll Road, but the path to the bridge is impassable to vehicles. The Antelope Hill Highway Bridge is one of only three surviving twin concrete girder bridges in Arizona, with the other two being the Santa Cruz Bridge and Hell Canyon Bridge.

== See also ==
- Agua Caliente, Arizona – Ghost town once served by the bridge.
- Gillespie Dam Bridge
- Ocean to Ocean Bridge
- McPhaul Suspension Bridge
- Dixie Overland Highway
- Bankhead Highway
- Old Spanish Trail (auto trail)
- Antelope Hill, Arizona
- List of bridges on the National Register of Historic Places in Arizona
- National Register of Historic Places listings in Yuma County, Arizona
