= Arizona State Route 195 =

Highway in Arizona

State Route 195
- Robert A. Vaughan Expressway
- SR 195 highlighted in red

Route information
- Maintained by ADOT
- Length: 22.08 mi (35.53 km)
- Existed: 2009–present

Major junctions
- South end: Avenue E½ near San Luis
- North end: I-8 in Yuma

Location
- Country: United States
- State: Arizona
- Counties: Yuma

Highway system
- Arizona State Highway System; Interstate; US; State; Scenic Proposed; Former
← US 191	→ Loop 202

State Route 195 (SR 195), also known as the Robert A. Vaughan Expressway, is a 22.08-mile (35.53 km) state highway in Yuma County, Arizona, United States, that serves the Yuma area. It begins in Yuma east of downtown, intersecting with Interstate 8 (I‑8) and heads south and then west, coming to an end at the intersection with Avenue E½ near San Luis.

== Route description ==
SR 195 exists as mainly a divided highway that has been designed to be upgraded to a freeway in the future. It is officially named the Robert A. Vaughan Expressway, honoring the then-director of the Yuma Metropolitan Planning Organization during the highway's planning.

== History ==
The only connection from I-8 to the San Luis Port of Entry was US 95, which runs as a surface street through the downtown business districts of Yuma, San Luis and Somerton. The area has experienced significant population growth since the 2000 Census. In the period from 2000 to 2005, the city of Yuma grew in population by 9.3%, the city of San Luis grew by 41.3%, and the town of Somerton grew by 38.6%, and anticipation that the growth trend will continue has fueled concerns about increasing traffic congestion. Additionally, the Yuma Metropolitan Planning Organization (YMPO) has estimated that commercial truck traffic through the San Luis port to increase to over 12,000 daily by 2015.

Planning for the construction of SR 195 was implemented in response to these concerns. As of 1999, YMPO has secured an agreement with the state Department of Transportation to assist with funding for the project. In addition to addressing traffic concerns for the area, the highway will provide access for a proposed new port of entry east of San Luis. YMPO envisions these projects, along with potential expansion of cargo operations at the Yuma International Airport, as being parts of a concerted effort to increase the area's importance in regional and international trade and commerce. SR 195 was planned on November 15, 2002.

Construction of the northern end of SR 195 began in late October 2007, and was completed September 2009.

== Junction list ==
The entire route is in Yuma County.

Location	mi	km	Destinations	Notes
	5.50	8.85	Avenue E½ to US 95	Temporary southern terminus; road continues west as Cesar Chavez Boulevard
	6.01	9.67	Avenue E – Commercial Port of Entry	
Yuma	26.95	43.37	BL 8 / Historic US 80 (32nd Street)	
Yuma	27.61	44.43	I-8 / Gila Ridge Road / Araby Road to US 95 – Phoenix, Tucson, San Diego	Dumbbell interchange; northern terminus; I-8 exit 7; Araby Rd. serves Exceptional Community Hospital
1.000 mi = 1.609 km; 1.000 km = 0.621 mi
