= Business routes of Interstate 8 =

Interstate 8 Business

Location
- Country: United States

Highway system
- Interstate Highway System; Main; Auxiliary; Suffixed; Business; Future

There are five business routes of Interstate 8 (I-8).

The portions of the I-8 business routes through California are mostly unsigned. All Interstate business routes in California are assigned by the California Department of Transportation (Caltrans), but are not maintained by Caltrans unless they overlay other routes of the state highway system. Local authorities may request route assignment from the Caltrans Transportation System Information Program, and all requests require approval of the executive committee of the American Association of State Highway and Transportation Officials (AASHTO).

== El Cajon loop ==
Interstate 8 Business
- Location: El Cajon–Lakeside, California
- Length: 8.15 mi (13.12 km)

Business Loop 8 (I-8 Bus.) begins as El Cajon Boulevard at an interchange with I-8, loosely paralleling the freeway on the northern side. The loop passes through Bostonia and Lakeview before ending at the Lake Jennings Park Road interchange with I-8.

Major intersections
The entire route is in San Diego County.

Location	mi	km	Destinations	Notes
El Cajon	0.00	0.00	I-8 west (Mission Valley Freeway)	Western terminus; I-8 exit 15; no access to I-8 east
El Cajon			Chase Avenue, Boulevard Place	Partial interchange eastbound, at-grade intersections westbound
El Cajon	3.77– 3.86	6.07– 6.21	I-8 east (Mission Valley Freeway)	I-8 west exit 20A; no access to I-8 west
Lakeside	7.98– 8.15	12.84– 13.12	I-8 – San Diego, El Centro	Eastern terminus; road continues south as Lake Jennings Park Road
1.000 mi = 1.609 km; 1.000 km = 0.621 mi: Incomplete access

== Alpine loop ==
Interstate 8 Business
- Location: Alpine, California

Business Loop 8 (I-8 Bus.) in Alpine spanned from I-8 exit 30 to exit 33 and was mostly former US 80 along Alpine Drive.

== El Centro loop ==
Interstate 8 Business
- Location: El Centro, California
- Length: 4.25 mi (6.84 km)

Business Loop Interstate 8 (I-8 Bus.) is a business loop route that diverges from I-8 in El Centro, California, to pass through the downtown area. I-8 Bus. originates and terminates with I-8 and acts as a direct link to El Centro as I-8 bypasses the downtown area.

The I-8 Bus. path through El Centro traces roughly three sides of a rectangle with I-8 constituting the fourth side. I-8 Bus. begins at its western terminus with I-8 by going north along Imperial Avenue. When I-8 Bus. reaches the intersection of Adams Avenue it turns east along that road. Along this stretch, I-8 Bus. is joined by State Route 86 (SR 86) which approaches from the north along Imperial Avenue, and by Imperial County Route S80 which approaches from the west along Adams Avenue. The three routes continue joined as Adams Avenue ends and turns south along Fourth Avenue where S80 then turns to continue east. I-8 Bus. and SR 86 continue south running concurrent until I-8 Bus. reaches its eastern terminus with I-8.

Only the portion of I-8 Bus. that runs concurrently with SR 86 is maintained by the state. Along its concurrency with SR 86, I-8 Bus. is designated as part of the Juan Bautista de Anza National Historic Trail.

Major intersections
The entire route is in El Centro, Imperial County.

mi	km	Destinations	Notes
0.00– 0.33	0.00– 0.53	I-8 (Kumeyaay Highway) – San Diego, Yuma	Western terminus; I-8 exit 114
1.69	2.72	SR 86 north (Imperial Avenue north) / CR S80 west (Adams Avenue west) – Brawley, Los Angeles	Western end of SR 86/CR S80 concurrency; former US 99 north/US 80 west
2.90	4.67	CR S80 east (Main Street) – Holtville	Eastern end of CR S80 concurrency; former US 80 east
4.19– 4.25	6.74– 6.84	I-8 (Kumeyaay Highway) / SR 86 south (4th Street south) – San Diego, Yuma	Eastern terminus; eastern end of SR 86 concurrency; former US 99 south; I-8 exit 115
1.000 mi = 1.609 km; 1.000 km = 0.621 mi: Concurrency terminus

== Winterhaven–Yuma loop ==
Interstate 8 Business State Business Route 8 (1)
- Location: Winterhaven, California – Yuma, Arizona
- Length: 14.84 mi (23.88 km)
- Existed: 1966–present

A map of the Winterhaven–Yuma business loop. The route is highlighted in red.

Business Loop 8 (I-8 Bus. or I-8 BL) begins at an interchange with I-8 and Winterhaven Drive in Winterhaven, California. The loop continues east, paralleling I-8 to the north and running concurrently with CR S24. I-8 Bus. then goes through downtown Winterhaven before CR S24 continues east and I-8 Bus. continues south, crossing I-8 again as well as the Colorado River into Yuma, Arizona. Passing to the west of Yuma Quartermaster Depot State Historic Park, I-8 BL goes through downtown Yuma as Fourth Avenue, intersecting US 95 after several blocks. The business loop curves to the east as 32nd Street, passing along the north side of Yuma International Airport and the south side of the Yuma Conservation Garden. East of the airport, I-8 BL passes through less-developed areas of eastern Yuma before ending at I-8.

It is one of very few Interstate business loops that is interstate in the sense of crossing a state line. The Arizona segment of the business loop is also a section of Historic US 80.

The segment in Winterhaven between the California–Arizona state line and I-8 was never relinquished to local control after the decommissioning of US 80 and remains a California state highway. It carries the unsigned designation of Route 8U (for "unrelinquished").

Major intersections

State	County	Location	mi	km	Destinations	Notes
California	Imperial		0.00	0.00	I-8 – El Centro, Yuma	Western terminus; I-8 exit 170
California	Imperial	Winterhaven	0.39	0.63	CR S24 west (Araz Road)	Western end of CR S24 concurrency; former US 80 west
California	Imperial	Winterhaven	1.66	2.67	CR S24 east (Picacho Road)	Eastern end of CR S24 concurrency; former US 80 east
California	Imperial		2.01	3.23	I-8 – San Diego	Northern end of SR 8U; I-8 exit 172
Colorado River			2.18 0.00	3.51 0.00	California–Arizona state line (southern end of SR 8U)	
Arizona	Yuma	Yuma	0.29	0.47	Historic US 80 west (1st Street)	Western end of Historic US 80 concurrency
Arizona	Yuma	Yuma	2.13	3.43	US 95 (16th Street) to I-8 – Quartzsite, San Luis	
Arizona	Yuma	Yuma	10.47	16.85	SR 195 south (Araby Road) to I-8	
Arizona	Yuma	Yuma	12.16– 12.66	19.57– 20.37	I-8 / Historic US 80 ends	Eastern terminus; eastern end of Historic US 80 concurrency, road continues as Frontage Road; I-8 exit 9
1.000 mi = 1.609 km; 1.000 km = 0.621 mi: Concurrency terminus

== Gila Bend loop ==
State Business Route 8 (3)
- Location: Gila Bend, Arizona
- Length: 5.96 mi (9.59 km)
- Existed: 1973–present

A map of the Gila Bend business loop. The route is highlighted in red.

State Business Route 8 (3) (also known as SR 8 Bus.) begins at an interchange with I-8 west of Gila Bend before passing under the freeway, continuing east and merging with SR 85 at a truck stop. As Pima Street, the two highways continue through downtown Gila Bend before I-8 BL turns south away from SR 85 as Butterfield Trail and ending at I-8 at a diamond interchange.

Major intersections
The entire route is in Maricopa County.

Location	mi	km	Destinations	Notes
Gila Bend	117.28– 117.93	188.74– 189.79	I-8 / Historic US 80 begins / Frontage Road – San Diego	Western terminus; westbound entrance and eastbound exit; western terminus of Historic US 80; I-8 exit 115
Gila Bend	118.41	190.56	SR 85 south to I-8 east – Ajo, Mexico	Western end of SR 85 concurrency
Gila Bend	120.23	193.49	Historic US 80 east (Old Highway 80)	Eastern end of Historic US 80 concurrency; former US 80 east
Gila Bend	120.28	193.57	SR 85 north (Pima Street) to I-10 – Phoenix, Los Angeles	Eastern end of SR 85 concurrency
	122.93– 123.18	197.84– 198.24	I-8 to I-10 – Tucson	Eastern terminus; I-8 exit 119
1.000 mi = 1.609 km; 1.000 km = 0.621 mi: Concurrency terminus; Incomplete access
