= Gillespie Dam Bridge =

NRHP registered place in Maricopa County, Arizona

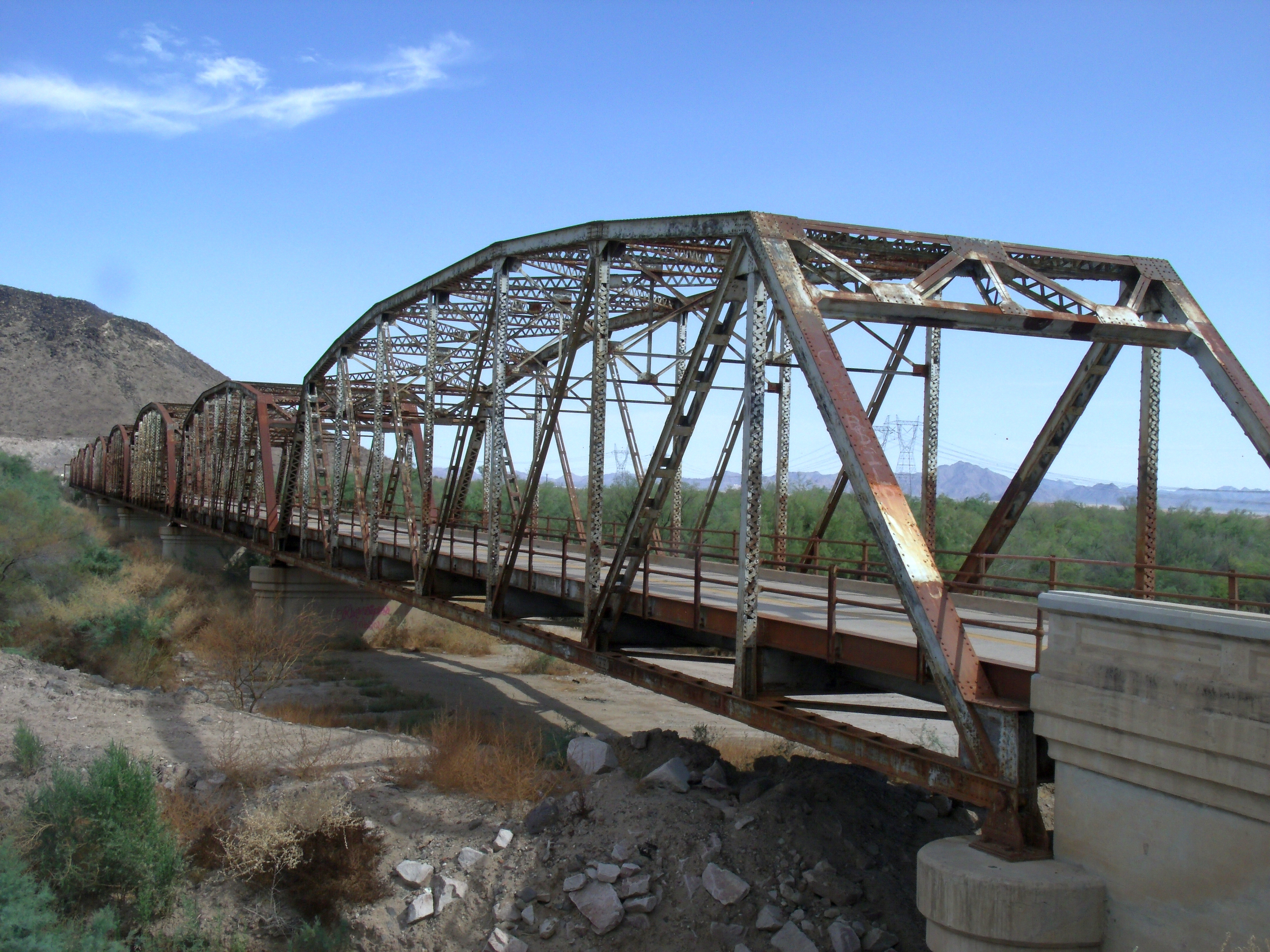
- Coordinates: 33.227261°N 112.769413°W
- Carries: Old US 80 Highway; Historic US 80
- Crosses: Gila River
- Locale: Maricopa County, Arizona, US
- Named for: Gillespie Dam
- Owner: Maricopa County, Arizona
- Maintained by: Maricopa County Department of Transportation (MCDOT)
- Inventory No.: 08021

Characteristics
- Design: Through truss bridge
- Material: Steel
- Pier construction: Concrete
- Total length: 1,662 ft (507 m)
- Width: 25 ft (8 m)
- Longest span: 336 ft (102 m)
- No. of spans: 9
- Piers in water: 8

History
- Designer: Ralph Hoffman
- Constructed by: Lee Moor Construction Company
- Construction start: January 1926
- Construction end: August 1927
- Construction cost: $320,000 ($4.64 million as of 2024)
- Opened: August 21, 1927
- Rebuilt: 2011–2012
- Replaces: Gillespie Dam auto apron Antelope Hill Highway Bridge
- Replaced by: SR 85 bridges over the Gila River
- Gillespie Dam Bridge
- U.S. National Register of Historic Places
- Location within Arizona Location within the United States
- Nearest city: Arlington, Arizona
- Coordinates: 33°13′38″N 112°46′09″W
- Area: 0.72 acres (0.29 ha)
- Built: 1927
- Built by: Lee Moor Construction Company, Arizona Highway Department
- MPS: Vehicular Bridges in Arizona MPS
- NRHP reference No.: 81000136
- Added to NRHP: May 5, 1981

Location
- Interactive map of Gillespie Dam Bridge

The Gillespie Dam Bridge (sometimes referred to as the Gillespie Dam Highway Bridge) is a through truss bridge spanning the Gila River in Maricopa County, in the U.S. state of Arizona. The bridge was constructed to bypass a concrete apron through the river in front of the Gillespie Dam, which was often closed due to flooding. Construction of the bridge started in 1925 and completed in 1927. From its opening until 1956, the bridge was part of U.S. Route 80 (US 80), a transcontinental highway between San Diego, California and Tybee Island, Georgia. The bridge was restored in 2012 by Maricopa County for the Arizona Centennial and now includes an educational interpretive center for visitors. The bridge became part of Historic US 80 in 2018.

== History ==
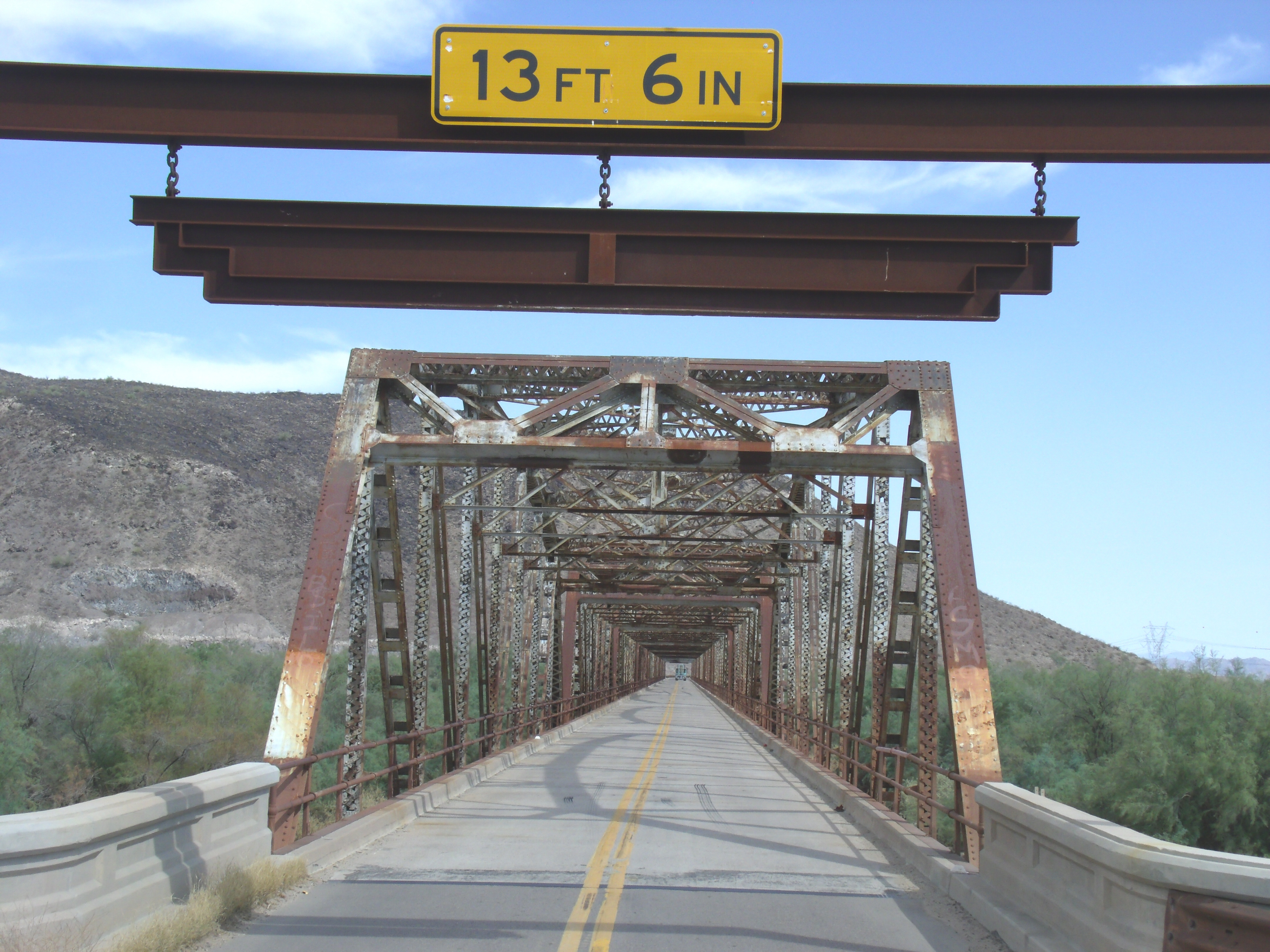
The western approach of the Gillespie Dam Bridge.

The Ocean-to-Ocean Highway was established in 1911 after delegates from California, Arizona and New Mexico met in Phoenix. The purpose of the new route was to establish an all weather transcontinental highway through the state and two territories. Between Yuma and Phoenix, a section of highway 200 miles (320 km) long traveled through Dome and Wellton before crossing to the north side of the Gila River, and passing through Agua Caliente, Arlington and Buckeye. Maintenance of the route was originally split between Yuma and Maricopa counties.

In 1912, state highway engineer Lamar Cobb began planning the construction of a dedicated bridge across the Gila River, surveying potential sites near Antelope Hill and Dome. Ultimately, the Antelope Hill location won out. Construction on the timber and concrete girder Antelope Hill Highway Bridge began in 1914. The bridge measured 1,000 feet (300 m) in length. Originally the state wanted to use prison labor to construct the bridge, but had instead let Cobb hire out construction work to an individual named Perry Borchers. However, after beginning work on the bridge in June 1914, Borchers defaulted and a flood the following winter badly damaged the incomplete bridge. The state returned to the original solution of using unpaid prisoners and finished the bridge in 1915. Between 1917 and 1923, the Ocean-to-Ocean Highway became part of the Dixie Overland Highway, Bankhead Highway and Old Spanish Trail auto trails.

However, problems began to plague the Yuma to Phoenix section of the Ocean-to-Ocean Highway. Not only was the highway between Antelope Hill and Arlington built on weak soil, but on the Gila River floodplain as well. A flood on November 24, 1919 badly damaged the highway as did a second flood in February 1920. Flooding was also taking its toll on the Antelope Hill Bridge, with the structure being washed out every time a large flood happened. The timber approach trestles had to be replaced every time and the concrete sections constantly repaired. While the concrete girder design made it stronger against automobiles than a steel bridge, it was weaker against the heavy forces of desert flash flooding. Furthermore, the bridge was built on one of the most turbulent sections of the river.

Due to the mounting problems, the Arizona Highway Department decided in 1920 to re-route the Ocean-to-Ocean Highway between Wellton and Arlington south of the river through Gila Bend. But due to Arlington being on the north side of the Gila River, a new crossing of the Gila would have to be established. An odd solution came in the form of agricultural businessman Frank A. Gillespie and the Gillespie Land and Irrigation Company. In 1921, Gillespie and his company constructed the Gillespie Dam, a concrete irrigation dam, spanning the Gila River. After plans for a bridge across the dam fell through, the Highway Department decided instead to build a temporary concrete apron at the foot of the dam to allow cars to drive through the river until the state could build a dedicated bridge across the Gila. The apron was completed and opened to traffic in 1922. However, when river conditions proved temperamental or treacherous, the apron was either shut down or several cars had to be tied together into a long train before crossing.

Three years after the construction of the concrete apron, the Arizona Highway Department began planning for a dedicated bridge again. Preliminary survey work by means of sounding and boring was conducted in April 1925. The Highway Department consulted bridge engineer R. V. Leeson of the Topeka Bridge and Iron Works for advice. Due to the recurring problems the state of Arizona had with concrete girder bridges, Leeson suggested the state turn to building a multiple span steel through truss bridge instead. Highway Department engineer Ralph Hoffman worked with Leeson to design a multiple span Camelback through truss bridge. The abutments and piers would reach 25 feet (7.6 m) below the riverbed into solid bedrock. The deepest pier would reach 43 feet (13 m) below the riverbed. Each individual through truss section would be 200 feet (61 m) long would weigh 3,000,000 pounds (1,400,000 kg) total. The roadway would be made of heavily reinforced steel and concrete, able to handle two 15-ton trucks at once. The Camelback or Parker truss design was standard on many other steel truss bridges. The bridge would also be a Federal Aid Project.

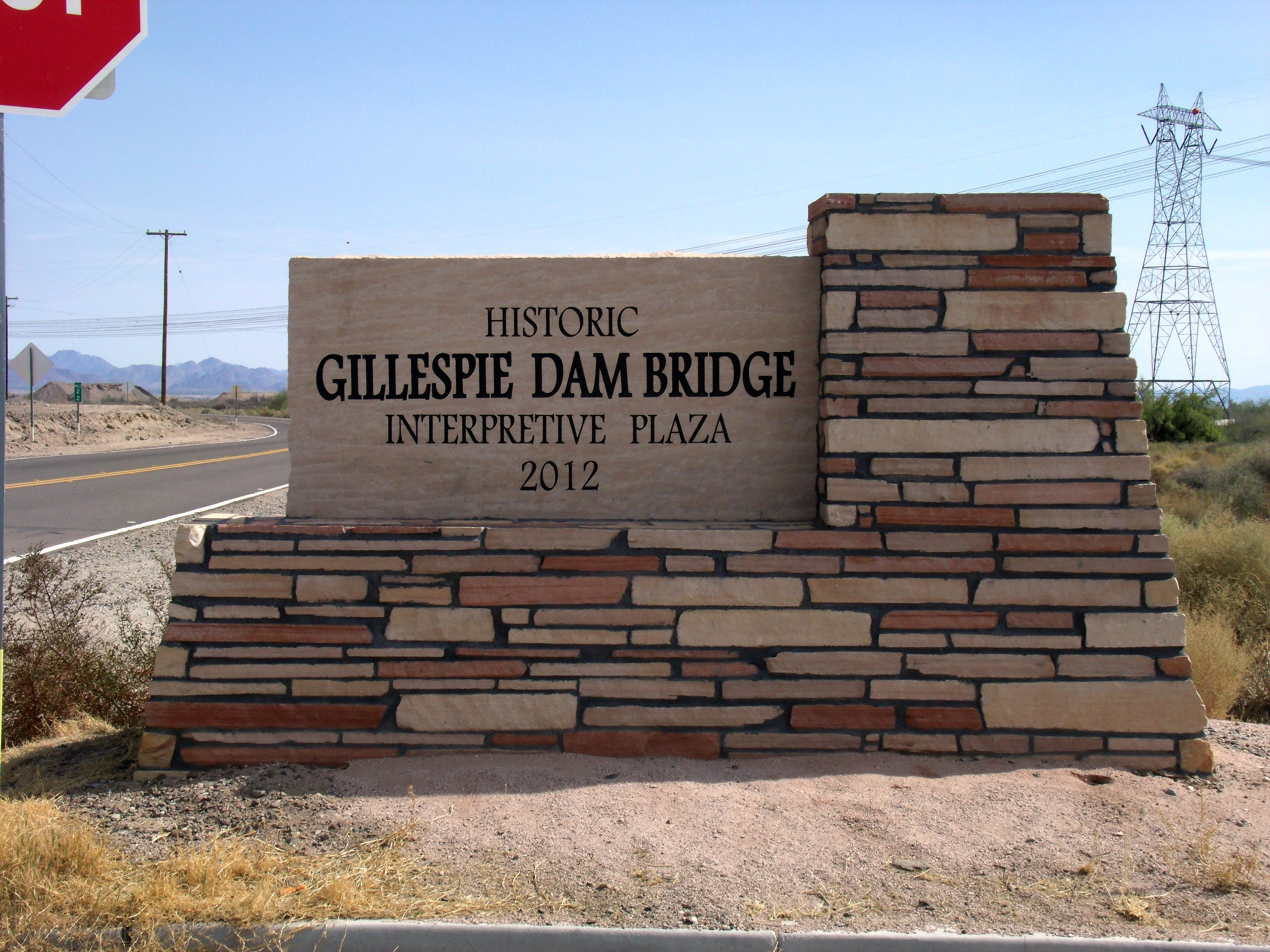
A welcome sign for the Gillespie Dam Interpretive Plaza.

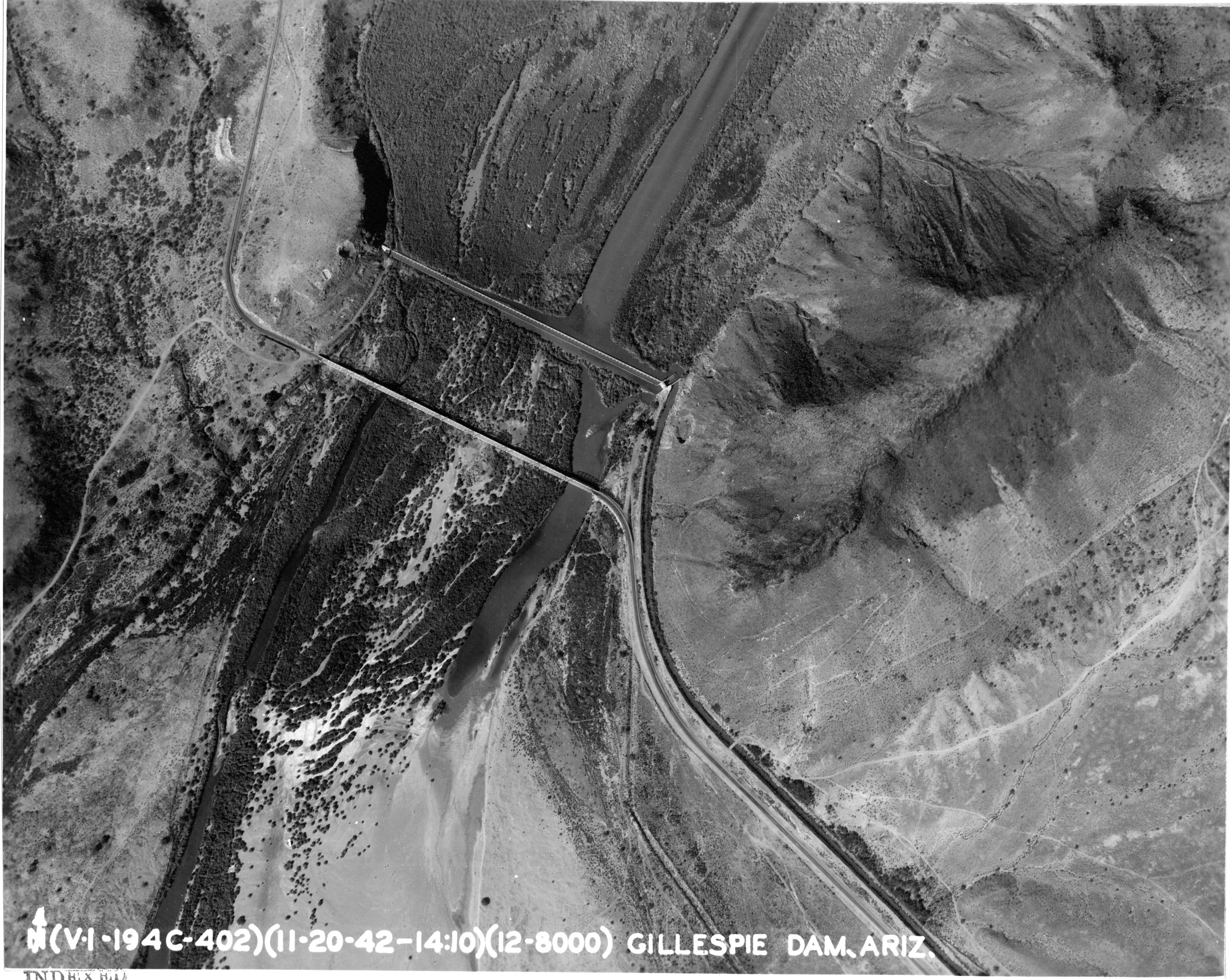
Bridge in the 1940s

In January 1926, the Highway Department began negotiations with potential contractors. Eleven construction companies responded with various bids. The Lee Moor Construction Company of El Paso, Texas, won the contract for quoting the lowest of all potential bidders. The same month, construction workers immediately began constructing the piers for the new bridge. Whilst excavating and drilling the foundations for some of the piers, groundwater often flooded two of the newly dug holes. Large 12-inch (30 cm) and 16-inch (41 cm) water excavation pumps had to be used, each pump able to remove between 3,600 US gallons (14,000 L) and 4,500 US gallons (17,000 L) per minute. The pumps ran for five weeks until construction of the piers was complete. On November 11, 1926, the Ocean-to-Ocean Highway became part of the new transcontinental highway U.S. Route 80, part of a new numbered federal highway system, which ran from San Diego, California to Tybee Island, Georgia.

Whilst starting construction of the bridge sections in February 1927, a catastrophic flood on the Gila River occurred. It was severe enough to close the US 80 dam apron for six days, and caused large amounts of equipment and materials needed for the bridge construction to be washed away. This was enough to delay the construction by two months. The Lee Moor team would return to work in the spring of 1927 to continue construction work. Once the steel truss sections were erected, final work began on pouring the concrete roadway, painting the steel trusses and installing guard rails. The new Gillespie Dam Bridge officially opened to traffic on August 1, 1927. Cars could now freely cross the Gila River without worrying about water conditions. The overall construction cost totaled $320,000 (which is $4.64 million as of 2024).

Upon completion, the bridge became one of the longest highway structures in the state of Arizona and was at first the longest steel bridge as well. The bridge was added to the National Register of Historic Places on May 5, 1981. Throughout the 1920s and 1930s, US 80 received many upgrades and modifications to its roadway including pavement. Despite constant modernization, the Gillespie Dam Bridge remained part of mainline US 80 until 1956, when a new alignment was built to the east. Today, this newer alignment is part of Arizona State Route 85, as the US 80 designation was removed from Maricopa County in 1977.

In 1993, a violent flood on the Gila River destroyed the Gillespie Dam. The surge of water also caused minor damage to the bridge by causing some of its support piers to settle. However, due to its strong steel truss design and the fact the concrete support piers were sunk into the bedrock, the bridge didn't collapse. The bridge's design is also the reason for its longevity. From 2011 to 2012, the Gillespie Dam Bridge underwent a $7.3 million restoration by Maricopa County. The project included strengthening of the concrete piers and steel truss sections, as well as replacement of the roller bearings and construction of the Gillespie Dam Interpretive Plaza. The Gillespie Dam Bridge and Boulder Creek Bridge are the only surviving multiple-span steel through truss bridges in Arizona. On September 21, 2018, the Gillespie Dam Bridge along with Old US 80 Highway were designated as part of Historic U.S. Route 80 by the Arizona Department of Transportation.

== See also ==
- Ciénega Bridge
- List of bridges documented by the Historic American Engineering Record in Arizona
- List of bridges on the National Register of Historic Places in Arizona
- National Register of Historic Places listings in Maricopa County, Arizona
- Ocean to Ocean Bridge
