= PPEP, Inc. =

Non-profit organization in the United States

Portable Practical Educational Preparation
- Founded: August 24, 1967
- Founder: Dr. John David Arnold
- Location: Tucson, Arizona
- Website: www.ppep.org

Portable Practical Educational Preparation, also known as PPEP, Inc., is a non-profit organization in the United States that was founded in 1967 by Dr. John David Arnold. Its motto is, "Dedicated to Improving the Quality of Rural Life". PPEP, Inc. is headquartered in Tucson, Arizona. The organization also provides their services outside of Tucson, primarily in Arizona. PPEP, Inc. employs over 550 staff members and is considered southern Arizona's 99th largest employer.

== History ==
On August 24, 1967, PPEP was awarded a $19,000 grant from the Committee for Economic Opportunity. Dr. John David Arnold was able to provide practical educational preparation to southern Arizona farm labor camps. This was all done aboard a 1957 Chevy bus. PPEP was officially incorporated on December 10, 1969.

== Education ==
PPEP TEC High Schools are a set of 11 charter high schools in southern Arizona, which provide programs and services to meet the needs of 15- to 21-year-old students enrolled in grades 9–12. PPEP TEC High Schools delivers a self-paced curriculum that is aligned with the Arizona Academic Standards. PPEP also is the charter holder for Arizona Virtual Academy, an online school.

== Social services ==
Encompass is a department of PPEP, Inc., which focuses in improving the lives of people with disabilities.

== Behavioral health ==
Project PPEP Behavioral Health Counseling services provides assistance in Substance Abuse, General Mental Health, Children services, Title XIX, DUI Treatment, Education, and Screenings, as well as Domestic Violence. They are a state licensed.
