= PPEP TEC High Schools =

Location
- 1840 E. Benson Highway; Tucson, Arizona; United States; 32.16966°N 110.944502°W

Information
- Type: Public Charter High School
- Motto: "Striving for Academic Excellence"
- Established: 1995
- School district: PPEP TEC High Schools
- Grades: 9-12
- Colors: Silver, Maroon
- Mascot: Pumas
- Newspaper: The Rock
- Affiliation: PPEP, Inc.
- Website: www.ppeptechs.org

PPEP TEC High Schools is a set of 6 charter high schools located across Arizona. They are publicly financed and their goal is to provide an alternative educational program for students aged 15–21, grades 9–12. PPEP TEC High Schools is an affiliate of PPEP, Inc.

The focus of the schools are on high academic standards, technology and school-to-work programs. Because it is a public school, all students from ages 15–21 may attend. PPEP specializes in helping sons and daughters of migrant and seasonal farmworkers in rural Arizona, at-risk students, high school dropouts or students who are in employment.

== Philosophy and background ==
PPEP TEC High Schools offer a self-paced curriculum that allows students to progress through courses on an individual level. Classes typically offer a low student-to-teacher ratio.

Students receive a high school diploma and are held to the same Arizona academic standards and assessments as other schools in Arizona. Education through PPEP TEC is free for all students.

== Locations ==
There are a total of 6 charter high schools across Arizona.

- 1 in Tucson, Arizona
  - Celestino Fernández Learning Center Google Map
- 1 in Somerton, Arizona
  - Jose Yepez Learning Center Google Map
- 1 in Douglas, Arizona
  - Raul H. Castro Learning Center Google Map
- 1 in San Luis, Arizona
  - César Chavez Learning Center Google Map
- 1 in Sierra Vista, Arizona
  - Colin L. Powell Learning Center Google Map
- 1 in Casa Grande, Arizona
  - Alice S. Paul Learning Center Google Map

Some locations offer different sessions from morning, afternoon, and evening.
