= McPhaul Suspension Bridge =

United States historic place in Yuma County, Arizona

- U.S. National Register of Historic Places
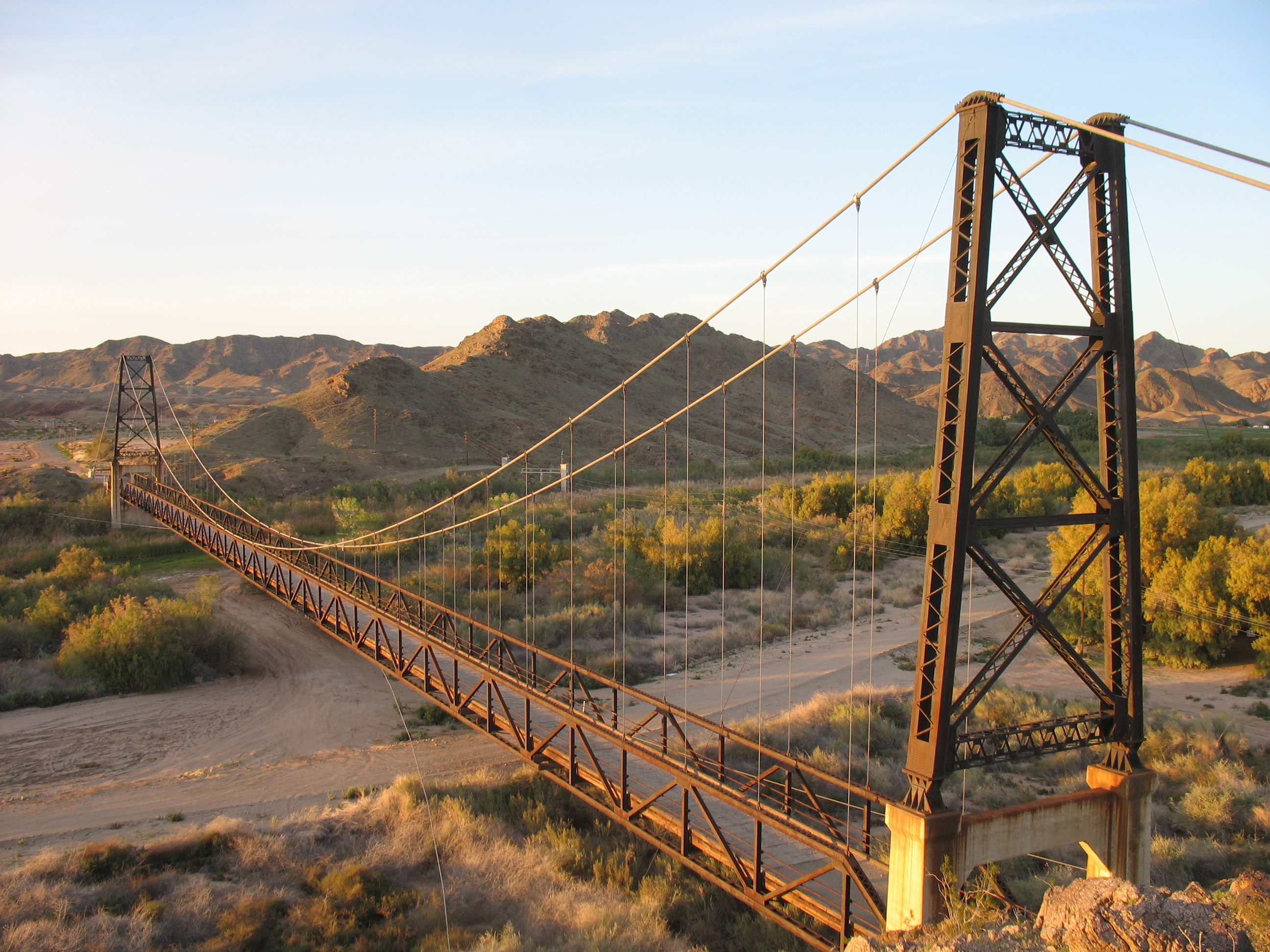

- Location in Arizona Location in United States
- Location: west of Dome, Arizona
- Coordinates: 32.759444°N 114.420556°W
- Area: 0.4 acres (0.16 ha)
- Built: 1929
- Built by: Levy Construction Co.
- Engineer: Ralph Modjeski (Consulting Engineer)
- Architectural style: Warren-type pony truss
- MPS: Vehicular Bridges in Arizona MPS
- NRHP reference No.: 81000140
- Added to NRHP: August 13, 1981

The McPhaul Suspension Bridge, sometimes known as Yuma, Arizona's Bridge to Nowhere, is a suspension bridge that used to carry a section of Arizona Route 95 (AZ SR 95, which later became US 95). The bridge is listed on the National Register of Historic Places. The bridge, which was named for local Yuma resident Henry Harrison McPhaul, was built over the Gila River in 1929 and replaced in 1968 when it was deemed insufficient for modern transportation needs. At only 16 feet (4.9 m) wide, the bridge was too narrow for a US numbered highway (in fact, even when built in 1929 it would have been too narrow, as the US highway system required two 9 feet (2.7 m) lanes). A dam and replacement bridge were built and the river was rerouted.

The bridge is 1,184 feet (361 m) long in total, with a deck width of 16 feet (4.9 m). Its main span is a 798 feet (243 m) Warren-type pony truss bridge suspended by cables from rocker type towers. The span is held by two steel cables 5.75 inches (146 mm) in diameter and 1,300.7 feet (396.5 m) long. It has two approach spans, 57 feet (17 m) and 114 feet (35 m) long, and approach roadways 140 feet (43 m) and 75 feet (23 m) long.

== See also ==
- List of bridges on the National Register of Historic Places in Arizona
