= Gillespie Dam =

Dam in Maricopa County, Arizona

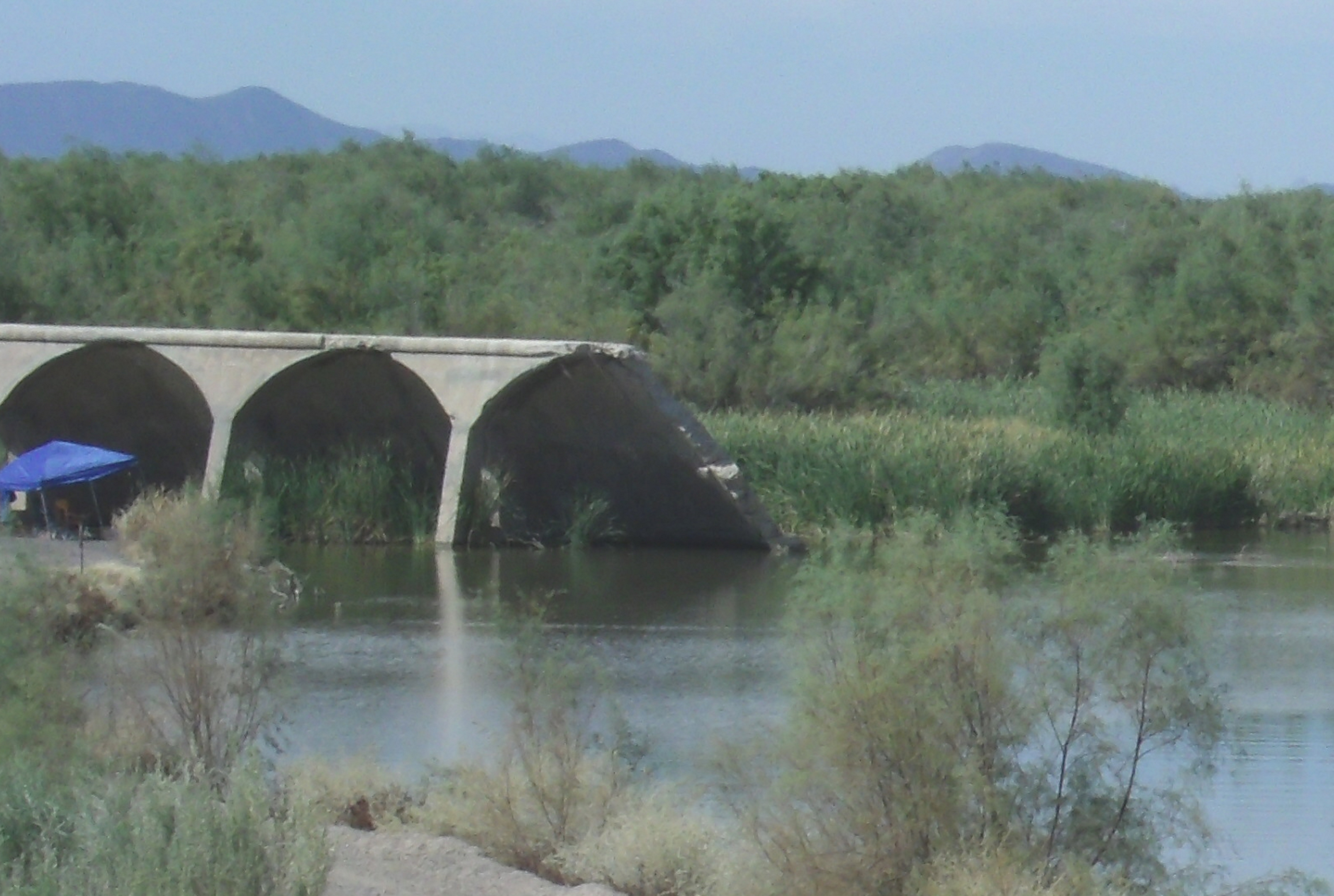
- The Gila River flows freely through the breached dam.
- Interactive map of Gillespie Dam
- Official name: Gillespie Dam
- Location: Maricopa County, Arizona, US
- Coordinates: 33°13′45″N 112°46′10″W
- Purpose: Irrigation
- Status: Decommissioned
- Opening date: 1921
- Demolition date: 1993

Dam and spillways
- Type of dam: Gravity dam
- Impounds: Gila River
- Height: 80 feet (24 m)
- Length: 1,700 feet (520 m)

Reservoir
- Creates: Gillespie Dam Reservoir (former)

The Gillespie Dam is a concrete gravity dam located on the Gila River between the towns of Buckeye and Gila Bend, Arizona. The dam was constructed during the 1920s for primarily irrigation purposes. It was key to the development of a 72,000-acre (29,000 ha) parcel owned by "millionaire" W.S. Gillespie of Tulsa, Oklahoma, initially allowing for irrigation of 10,000 acres (4,000 ha). A portion of the dam failed unexpectedly in 1993 during unusually heavy rains.

== History ==
The Gillespie Dam was constructed circa 1920 by a local rancher, Frank Gillespie (Gillespie Land and Irrigation Company), to replace an existing structure. As the dam was located at an important river crossing that would later become U.S. Route 80, the Arizona Highway Department – the predecessor to the Arizona Department of Transportation – constructed a concrete apron at the foot of the dam to allow for vehicular crossings. As the dam was a simple spillover construction, during times of heavy runoff cars would have to be pulled through the flow by trucks, and during floods could not cross at all.

In anticipation of the formation of the United States Highway System in 1926, the Highway Department commissioned the construction of the Gillespie Dam Bridge, a steel truss bridge just downstream from the dam. The bridge was completed and opened to traffic on August 1, 1927, at a cost of US$320,000 (equivalent to US$5,931,000 in 2025). The bridge, which was at the time the longest highway bridge in the state of Arizona, was immediately incorporated into the highway system as Route 80. The bridge carried US 80 traffic until 1956 when the highway was decommissioned, devolving to a county highway, thus placing the bridge under Maricopa County care. The bridge was added to the National Register of Historic Places on May 5, 1981.

== Townsite ==
The dam was also to have supported a new town of Gillespie that was to be built 12 miles (19 km) west of Gila Bend along the Southern Pacific Railroad. Gillespie was reported to have planned to spend $1,000,000 building the town, including "graded streets, cement sidewalks, business blocks and a hotel, many residences, water and lighting systems and all other modern conveniences."

== Failure ==
The winter months of 1993 saw unusually high rainfall amounts that resulted in record flows through central Arizona rivers and streams, including the Salt River, a major tributary to the Gila upstream from the Gillespie Dam. At approximately 10:30 on the morning of January 9, the dam failed when a segment approximately 120 feet (37 m) in length collapsed into the river. While the precise cause of the failure is unknown, the extreme flooding was almost certainly a contributing factor. The precise size of the flood was not recorded due to equipment failure, but an estimate based upon a high-water mark recorded on USGS equipment yielded a peak flow of approximately 200,000 cubic feet (5,700 m^{3}) per second, corresponding to a predicted 65-year flood, or a flood of a magnitude anticipated only once per 65 years. The previous high, recorded during similarly disastrous floods in 1980, had been 178,000 cubic feet (5,000 m^{3}) per second.

Due to the failure, three underground natural gas lines were exposed and later severed by the floodwaters. The bridge downstream survived, and was deemed safe for travel.

The remnants of the dam remain in place and the area is largely accessible to the public. A small earthen embankment exists to divert water into nearby canals for the Paloma Irrigation and Drainage District.

== Gallery ==
The Gillespie Dam
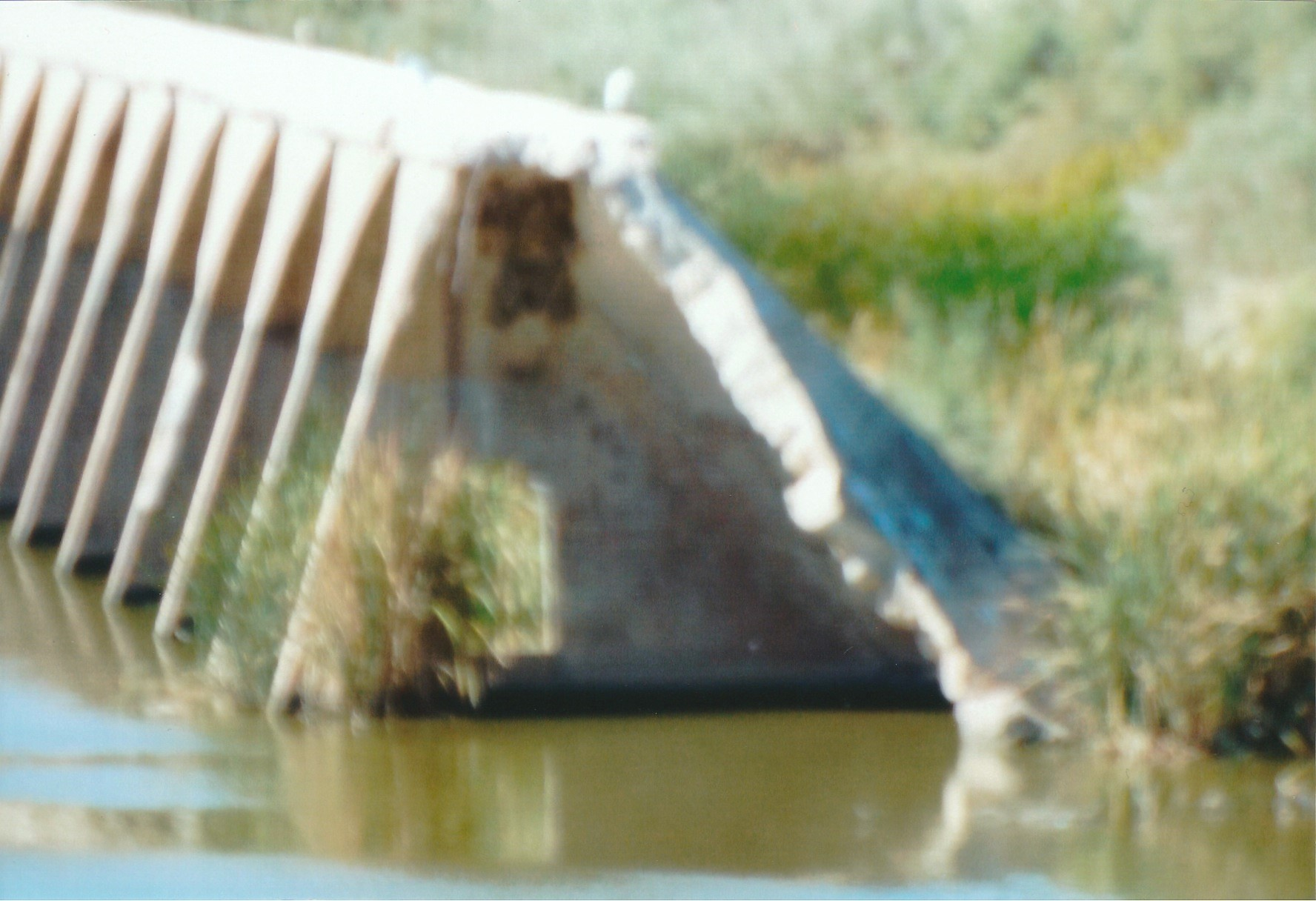
Ruins of the dam

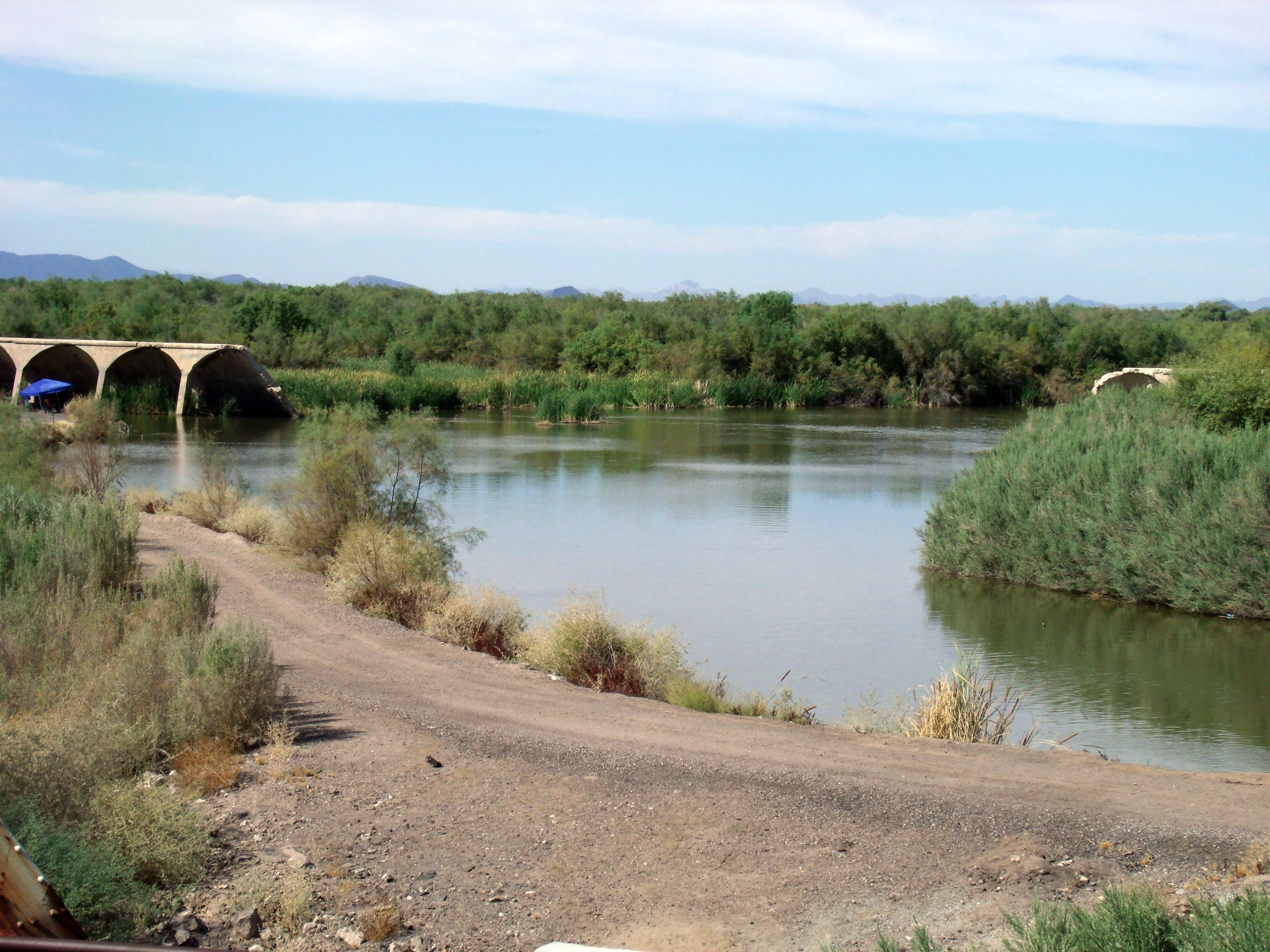
The ruins of the dam

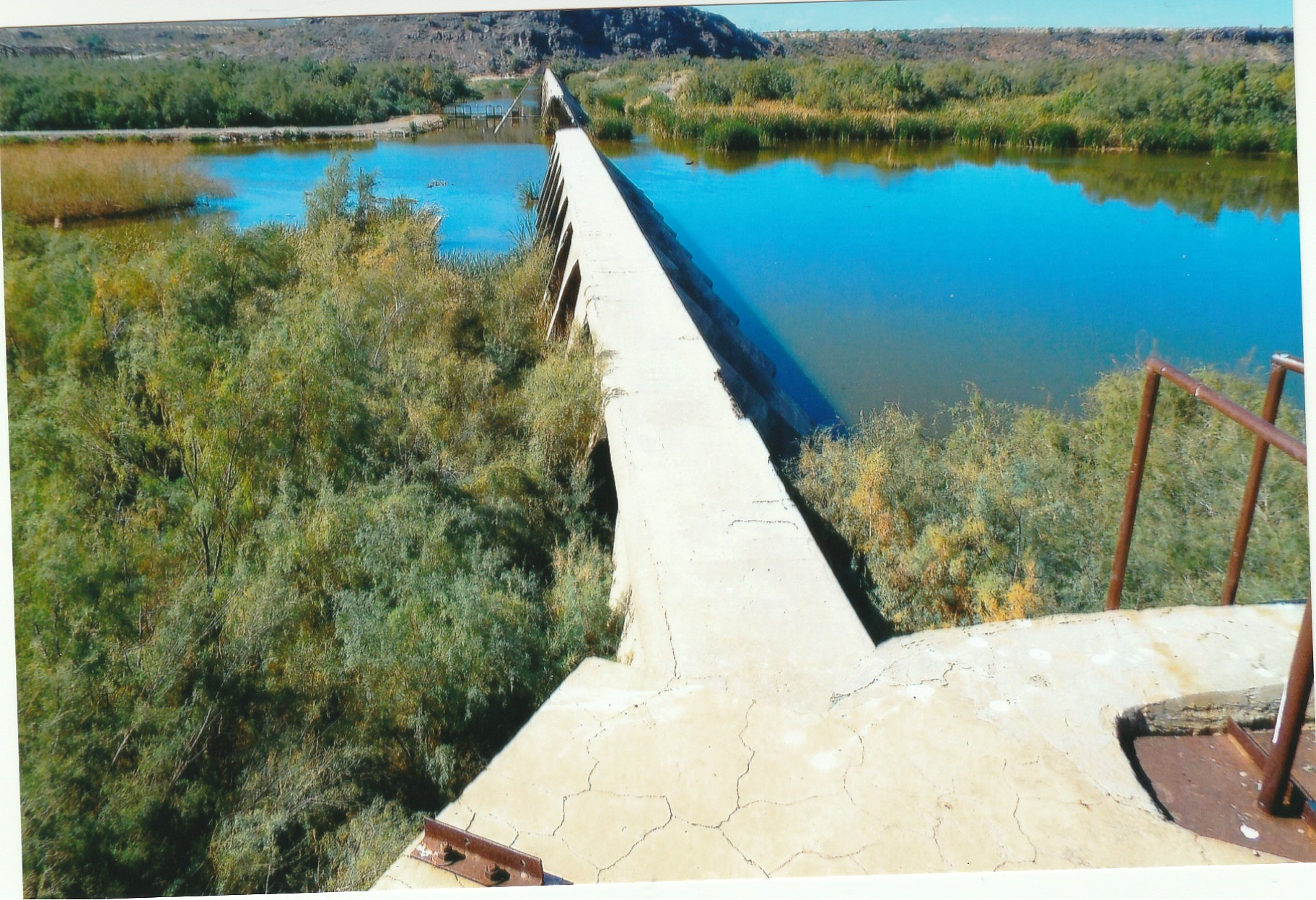
Different view of the dam

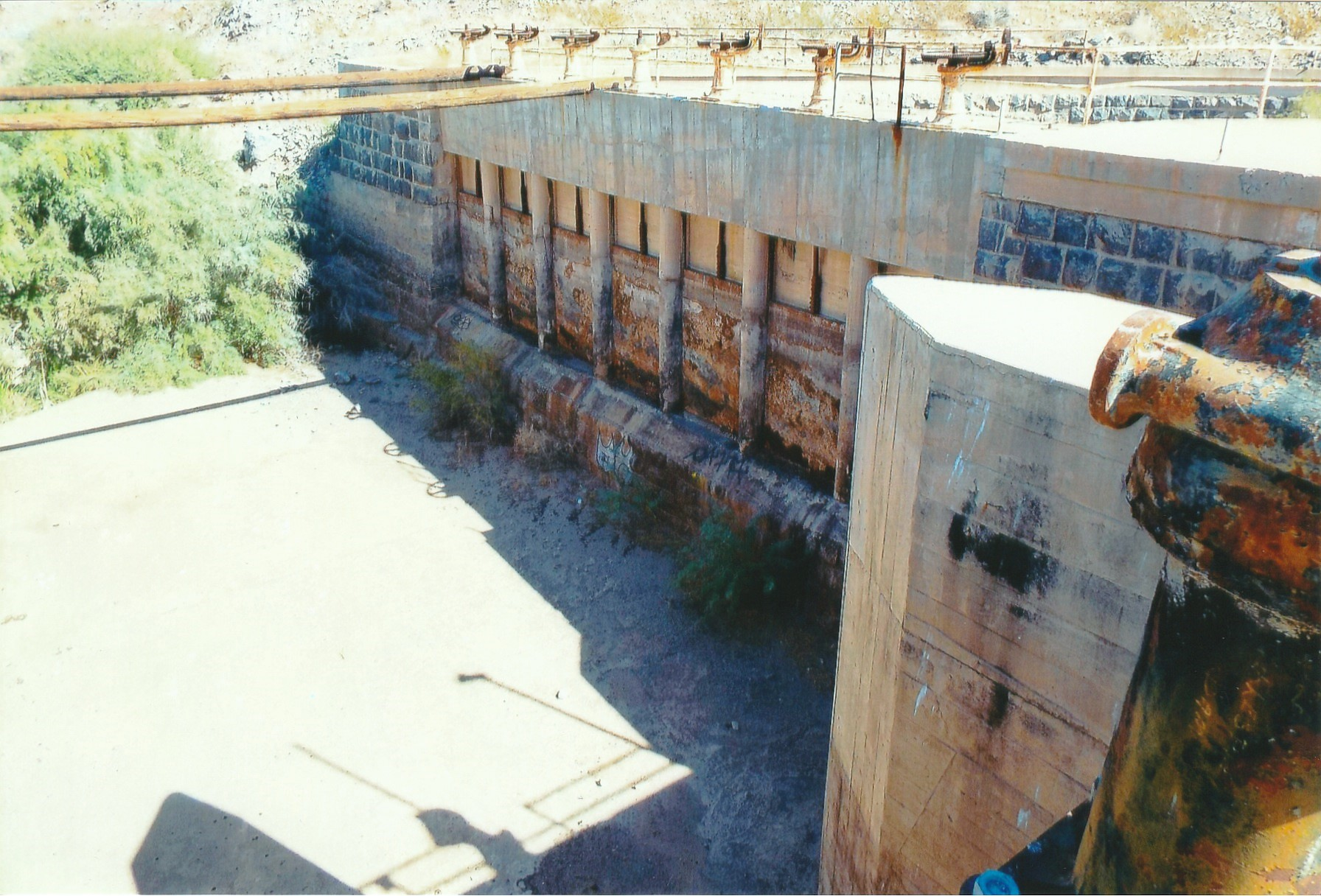
The Gillespie Dam

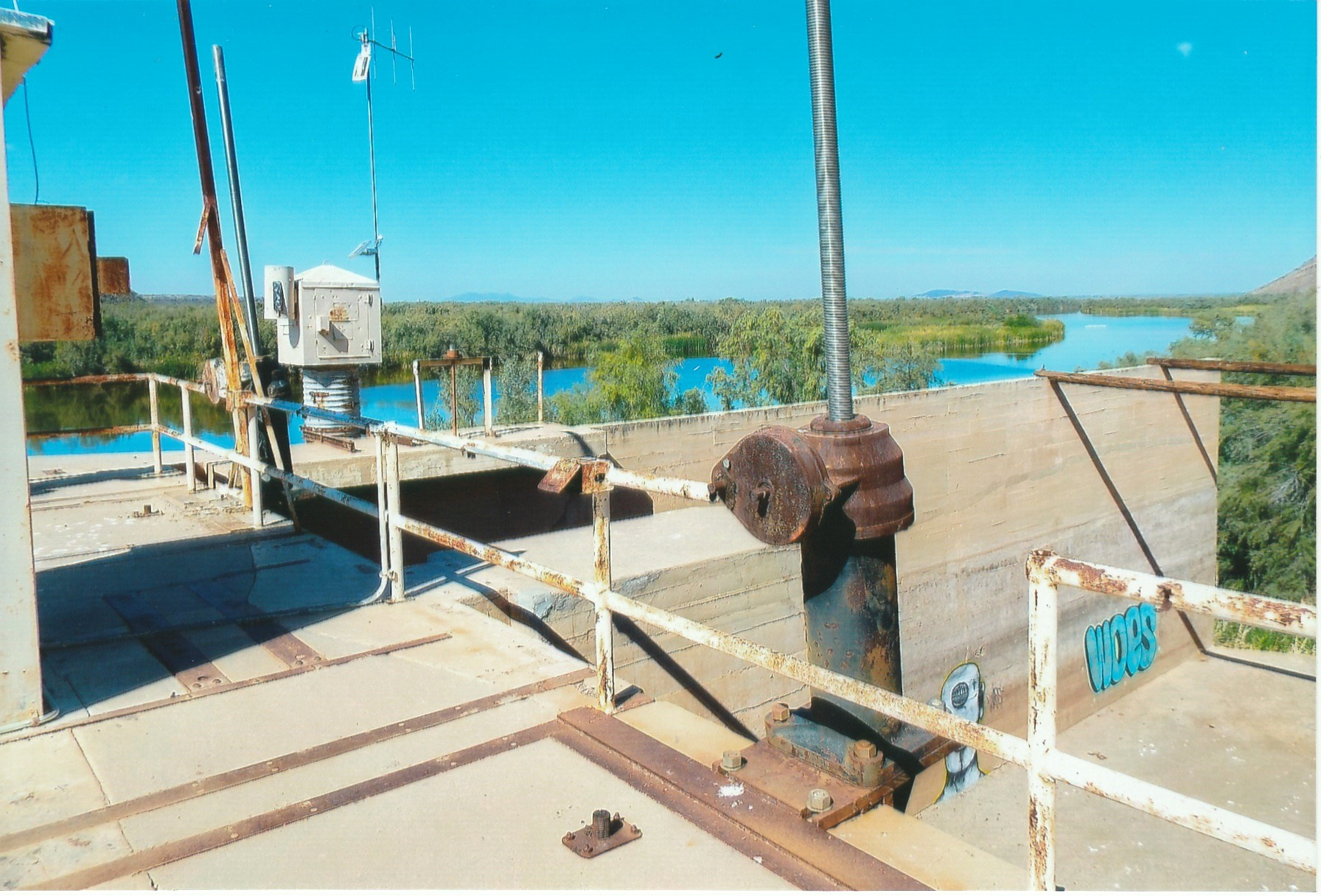
Rusted equipment on the dam

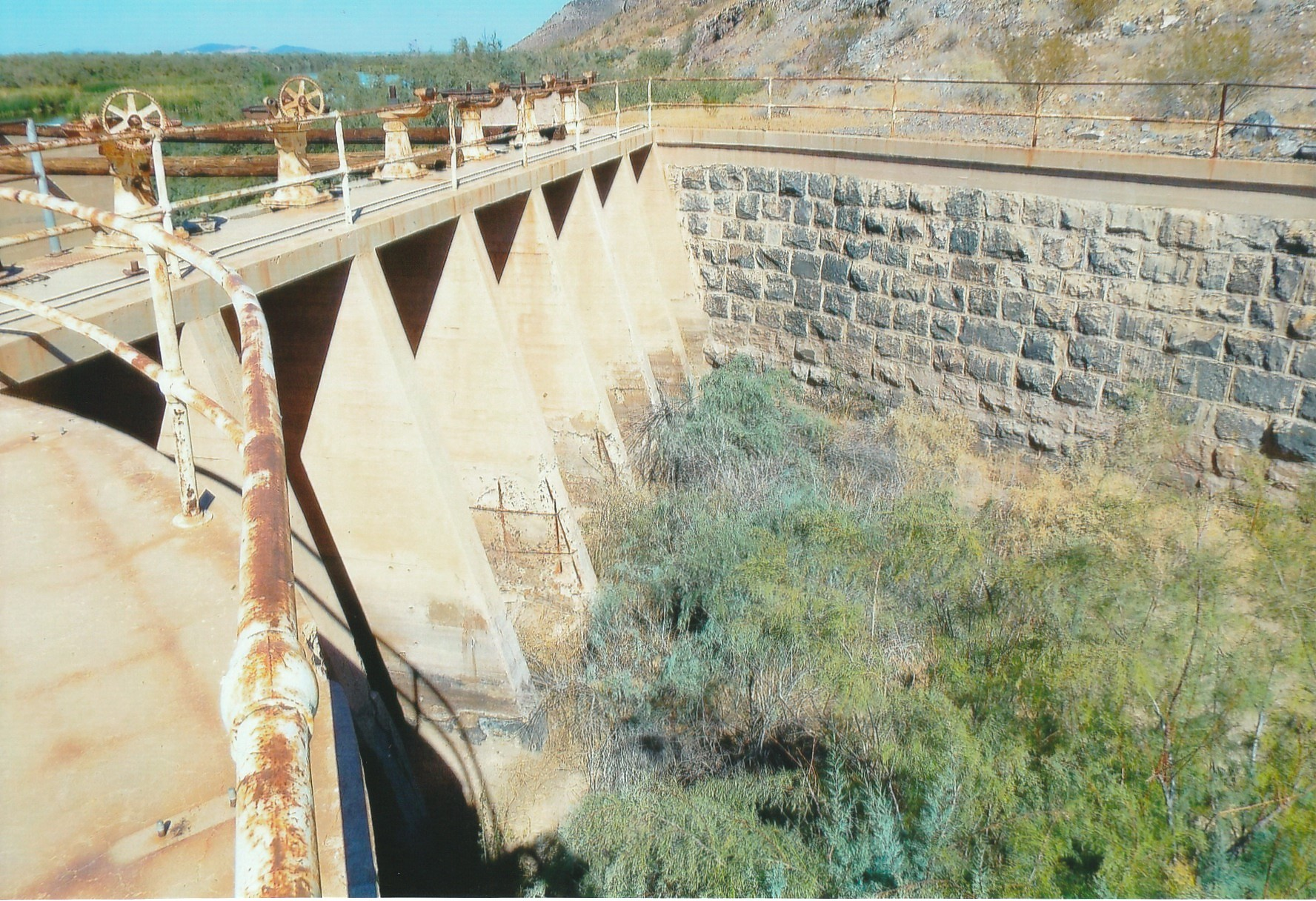
More rusted equipment on the dam
The Gillespie Dam Bridge
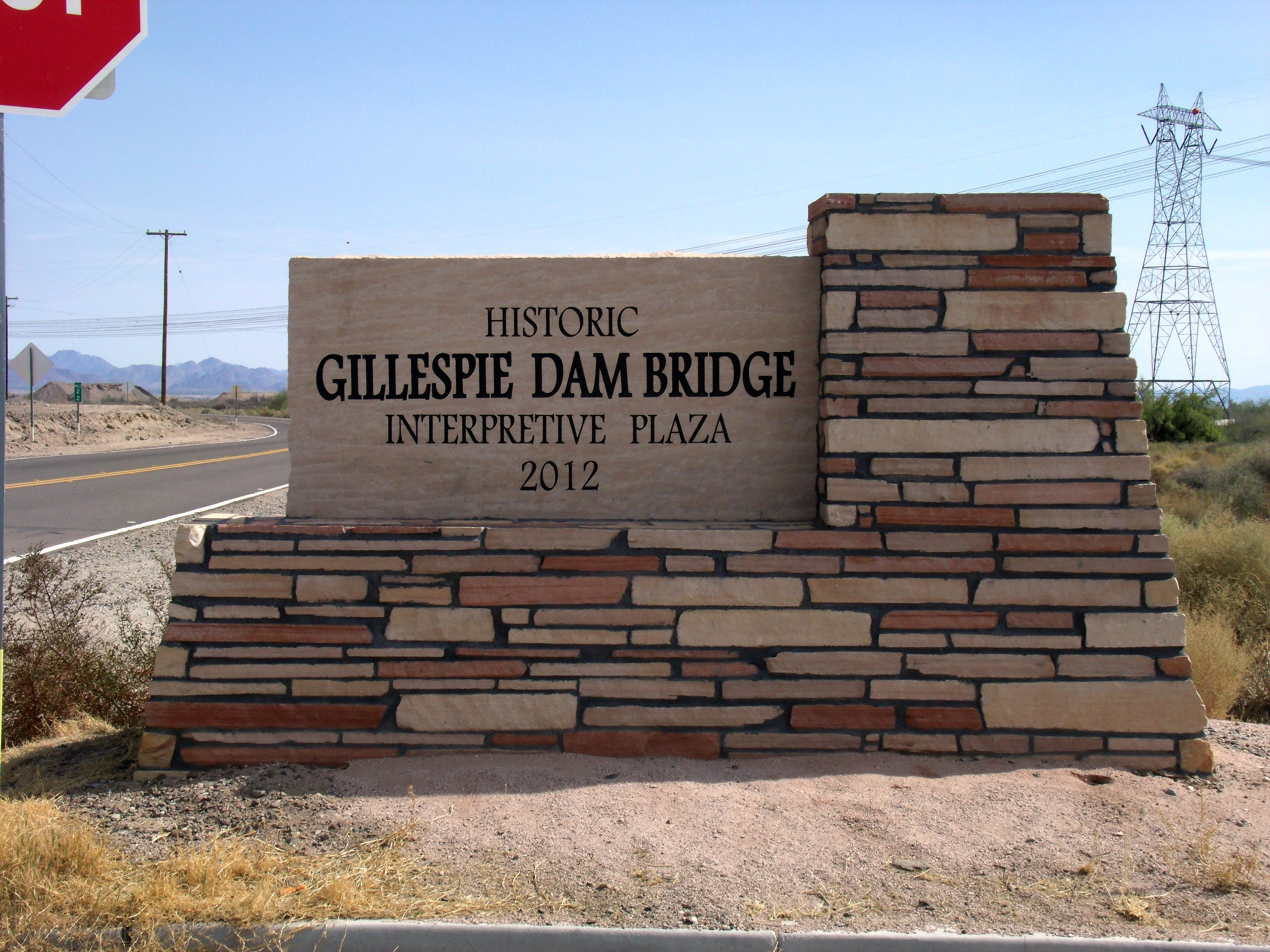
The historic Gillespie Dam Bridge marker

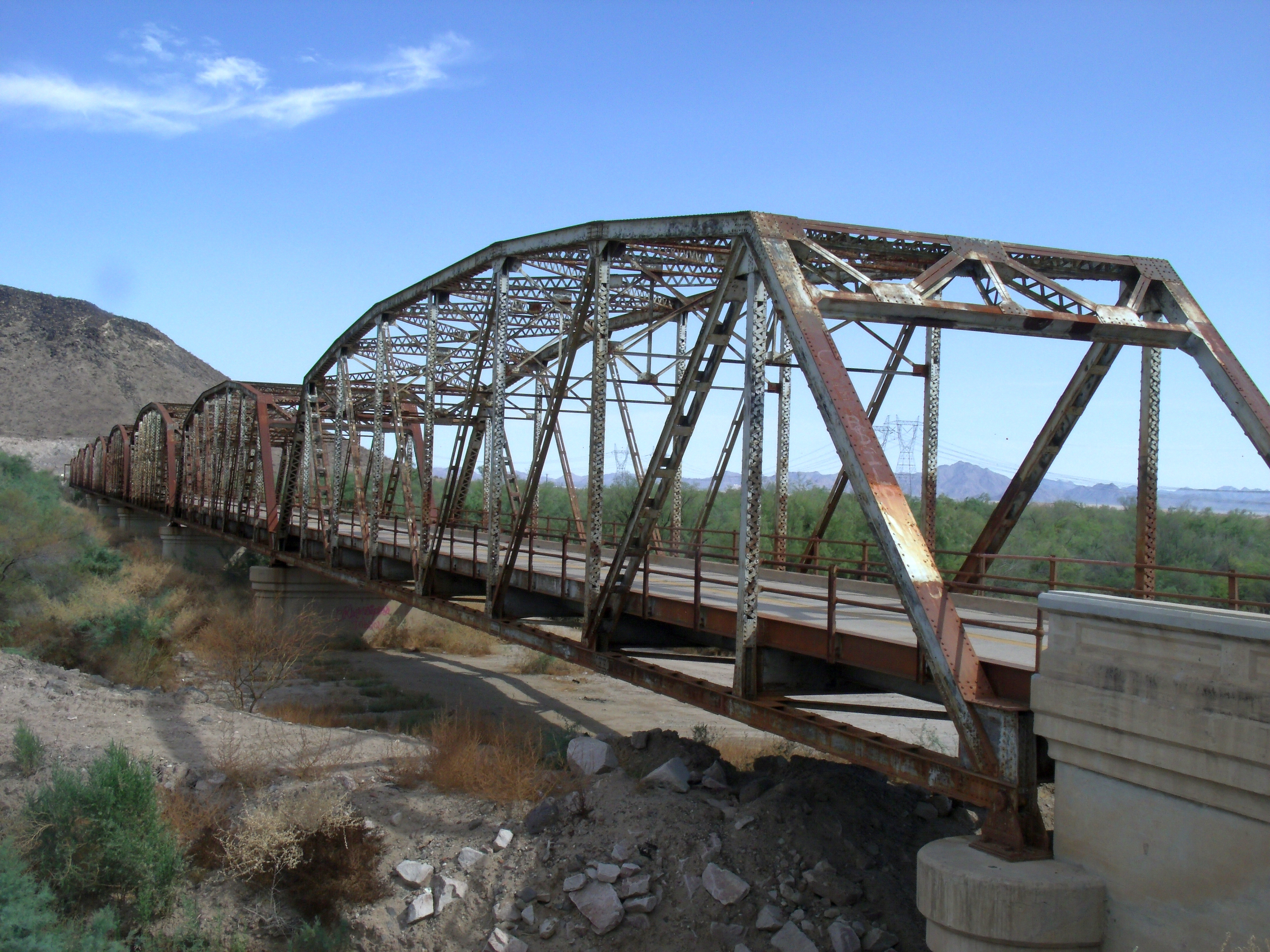
The historic Gillespie Dam Bridge

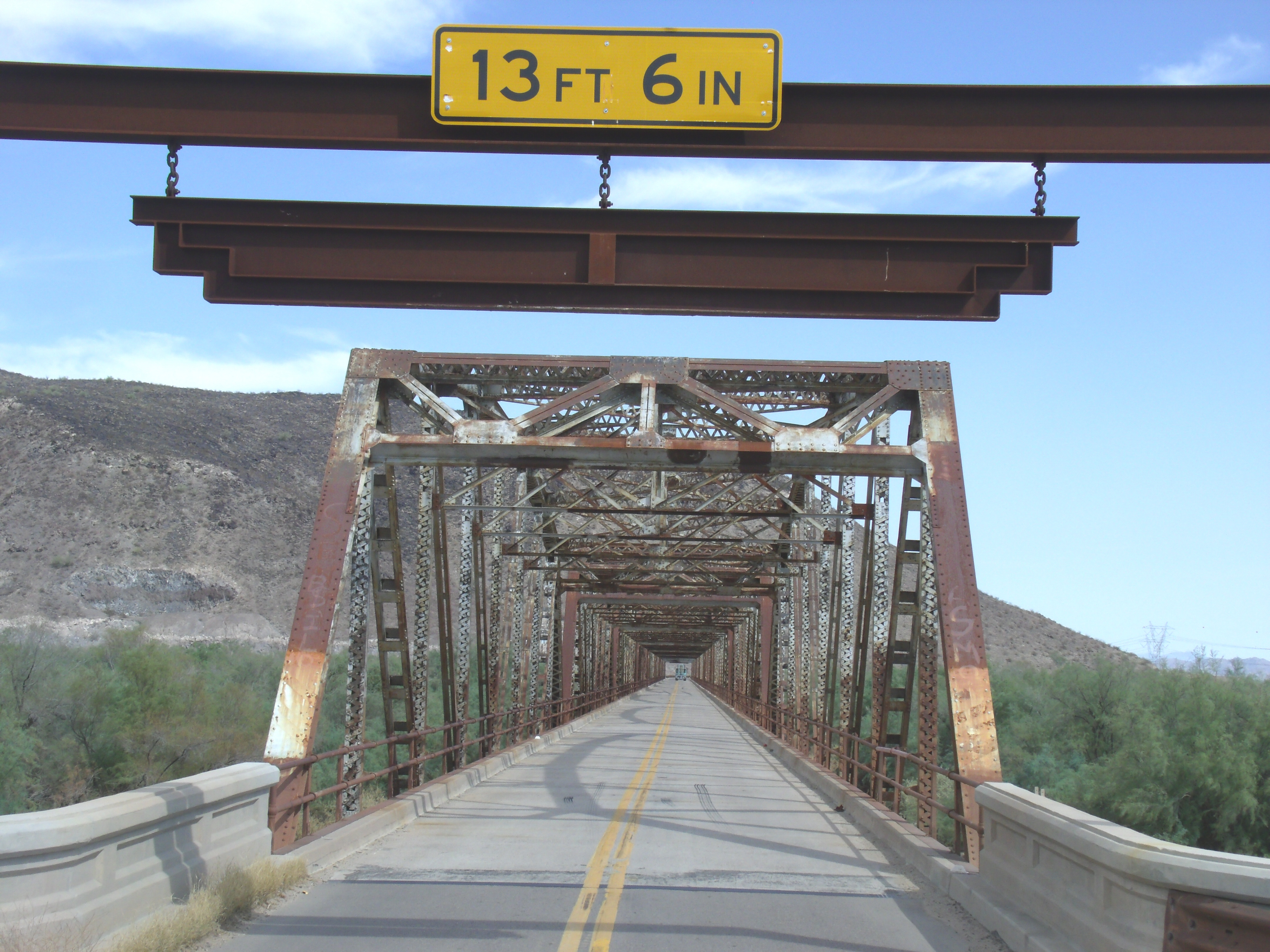
Front view of the bridge

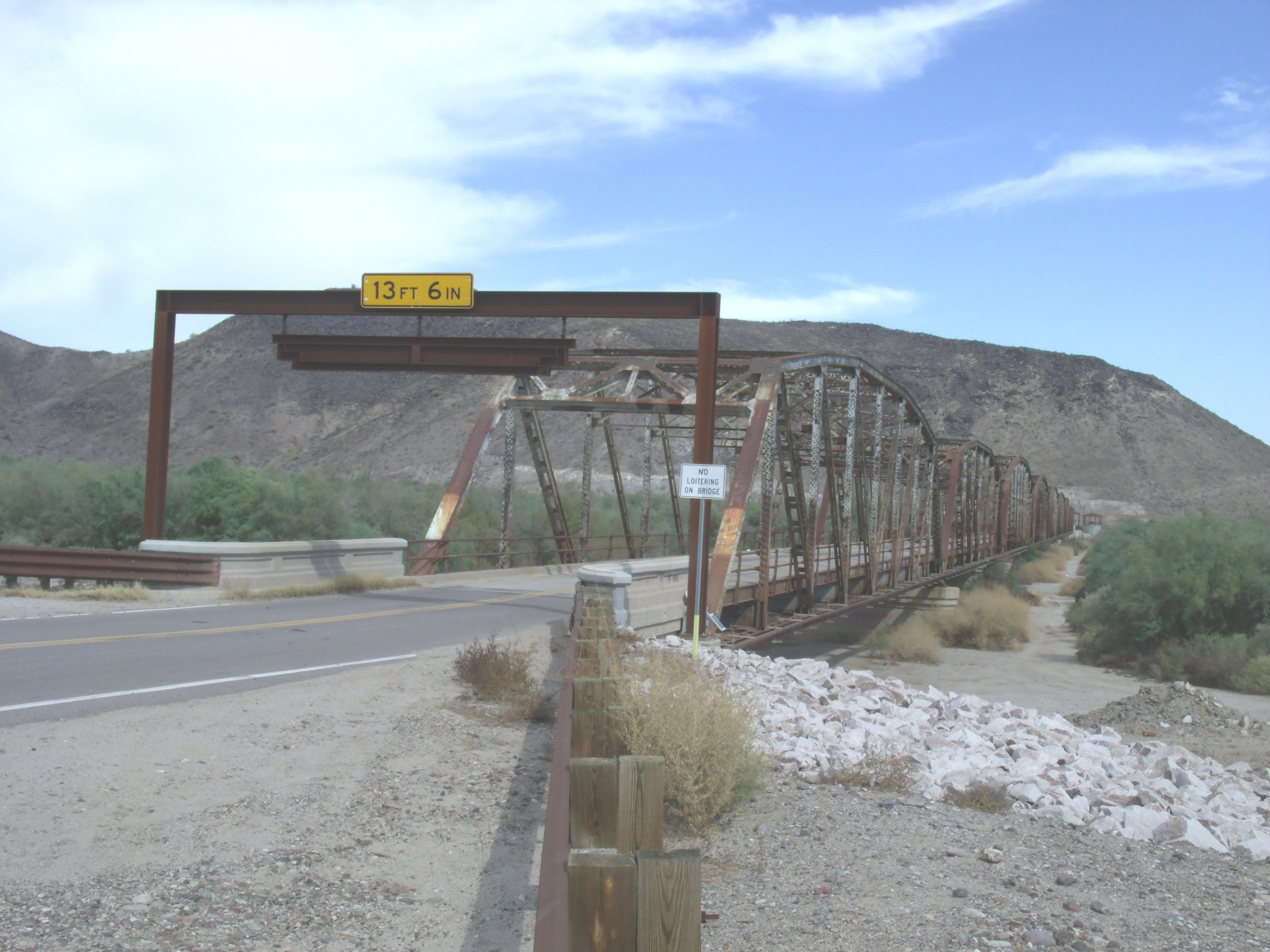
Different view of the bridge
