= San Luis II Port of Entry =

Commercial port of entry on the United States-Mexico border

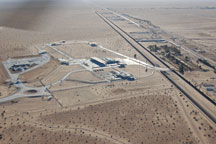
- San Luis II Port of Entry

Location
- Country: United States
- Location: Area Service Highway, San Luis, AZ 85349
- Coordinates: 32.4617°N 114.6988°W

Details
- Opened: 2010

Statistics
- 2011 Cars: 0
- 2011 Trucks: 34,190
- Pedestrians: 0

The San Luis II Port of Entry is a commercial port of entry, in that it only accepts commercial trucks entering the United States for inspection. It connects San Luis, Arizona with San Luis Río Colorado, Sonora. Passenger cars and pedestrians are directed to cross at the San Luis downtown crossing. The Port of Entry was built 5 miles east of the downtown crossing in 2010 in an effort to divert the commercial truck traffic and ease congestion. Roads connecting to Interstate 8 were improved to support the additional traffic.

== See also ==
- List of Mexico–United States border crossings
