= San Luis Port of Entry =

Border crossing between Mexico and the U.S.

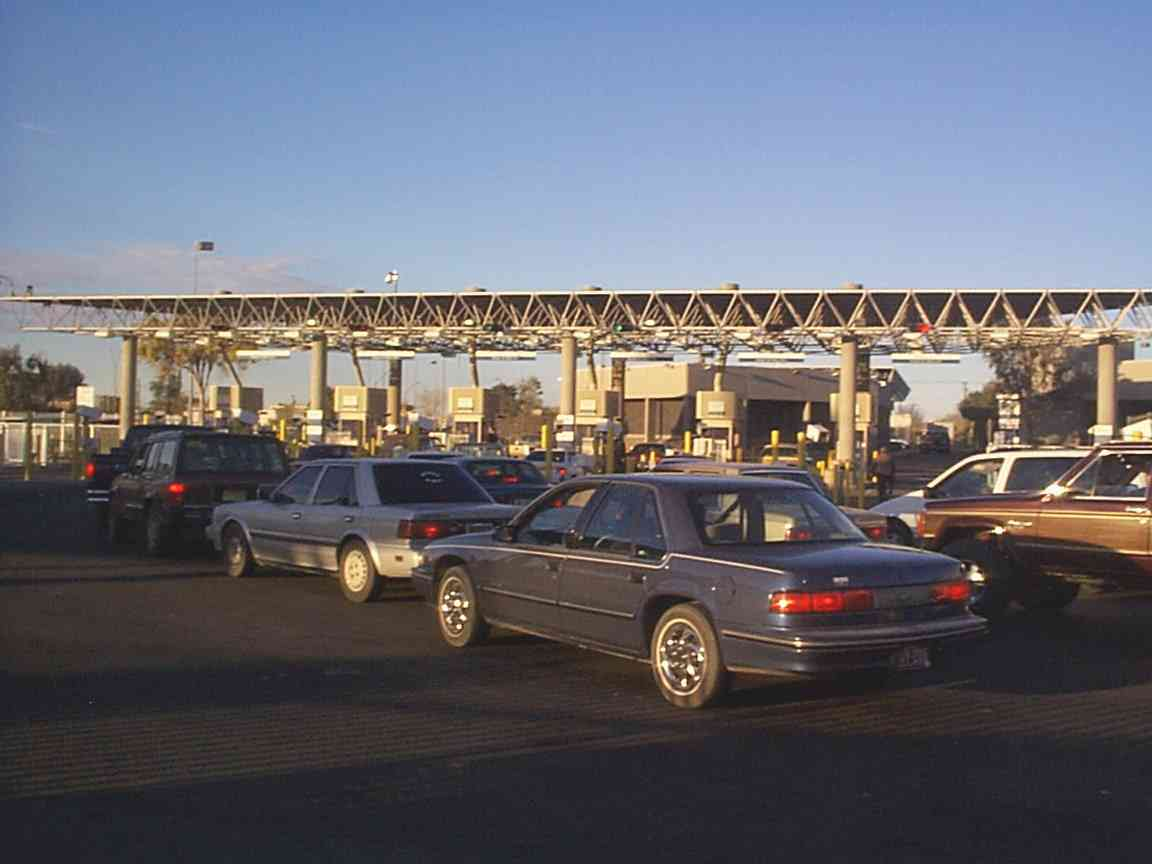
- San Luis Border Inspection Station

Location
- Country: United States
- Location: Highway 95 & International Border, San Luis, AZ 85349
- Coordinates: 32.485339°N 114.782120°W

Details
- Opened: 1930

Statistics
- 2023 Cars: 3,282,785
- 2011 Trucks: 0
- 2023 Pedestrians: 2,290,808

Website
- http://www.cbp.gov/contact/ports/san-luis

The San Luis Port of Entry has been a busy US port of entry since the early 1900s. It connects San Luis, Arizona, to San Luis Río Colorado, Sonora. It connects to U.S. Route 95 on the north and Mexican Federal Highway 2 as well as Sonora State Highway 40 on the south.

In 2010, all commercial truck traffic was diverted to the new San Luis II Port of Entry 5 miles to the east. In 2012, two additional inspection lanes were added to the port facility. .

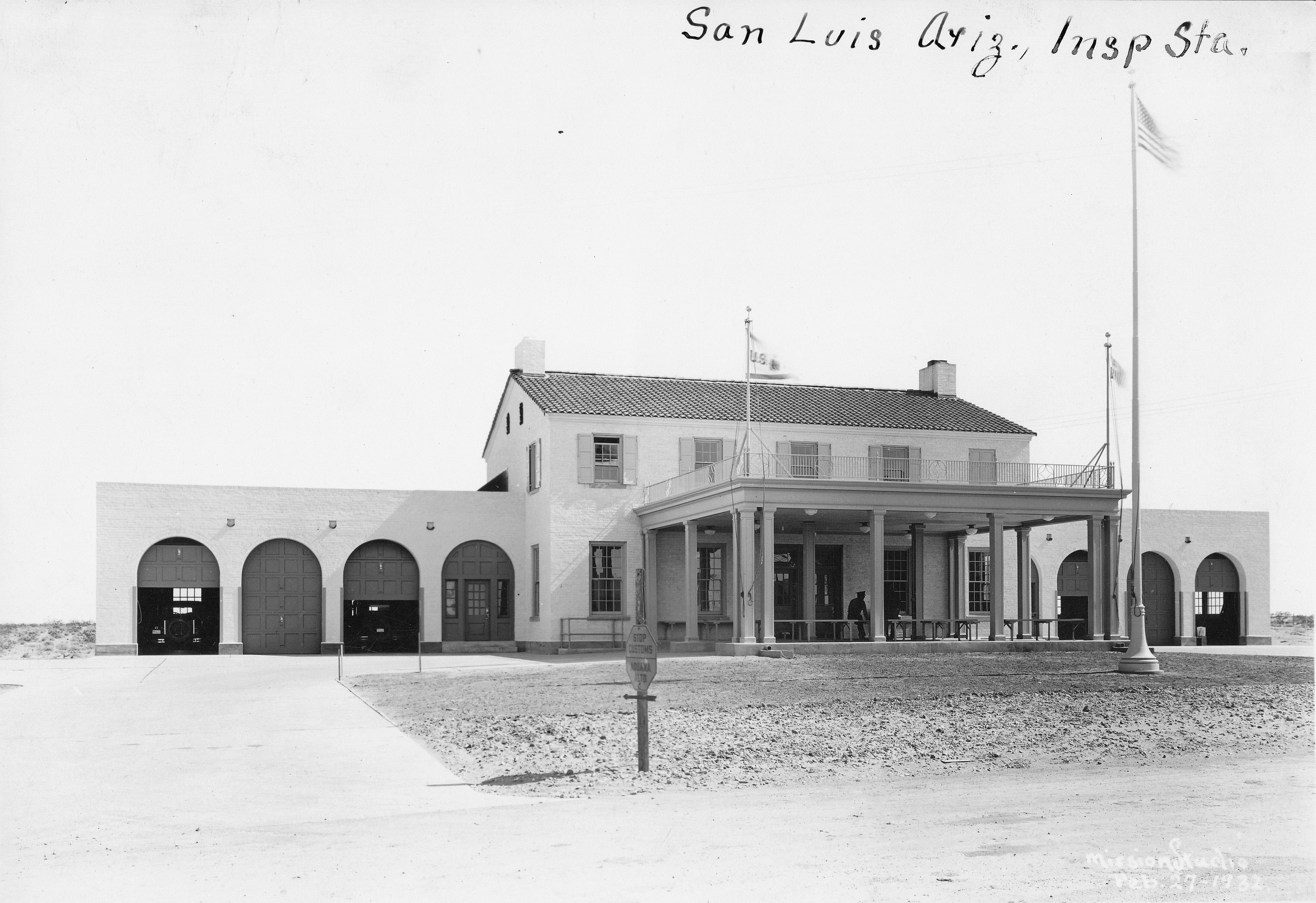
Former US Border Station at San Luis AZ as seen in 1932

The US built a Spanish revival brick border station in 1932. It replaced this building with the current facility in 1986. In 1952, Mexico built a border station that spanned the entire roadway, leaving only narrow portals for vehicles to pass. This configuration probably limited the size of the trucks that could use the crossing.

Traffic entering the United States must first travel west parallel to the border before turning right at the port of entry. This configuration prevents northbound traffic from creating congestion in the middle of San Luis Río Colorado.

== See also ==
- List of Mexico–United States border crossings
