= San Luis, Arizona =

City in Arizona, United States

San Luis
- City
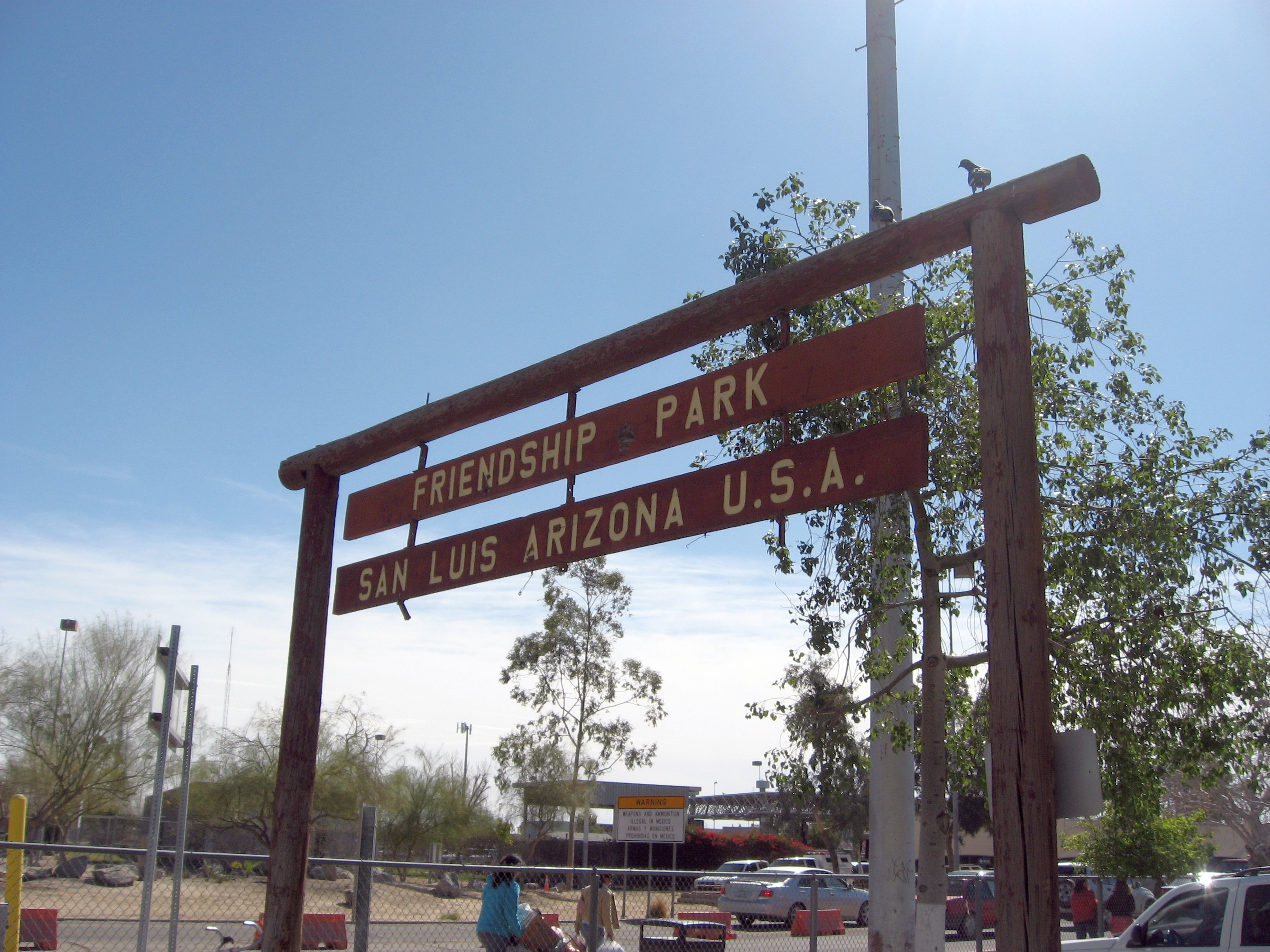
- Friendship Park

- Seal

- Location of San Luis in Yuma County, Arizona.

- Location in Arizona Location in the United States
- Coordinates: 32°29′35″N 114°44′26″W
- Country: United States
- State: Arizona
- County: Yuma
- Founded: 1930
- Incorporated: 1979

Government
  - Type: Council-Manager
  - Body: San Luis City Council

Area
  - Total: 34.10 sq mi (88.32 km^{2})
  - Land: 34.03 sq mi (88.13 km^{2})
  - Water: 0.073 sq mi (0.19 km^{2}) 0.11%
- Elevation: 167 ft (51 m)

Population (2020)
  - Total: 35,257
  - Density: 1,036.2/sq mi (400.08/km^{2})
- Time zone: UTC-7 (MST)
- ZIP code: 85349, 85336
- Area code: 928
- FIPS code: 04-63470
- GNIS feature ID: 2411795
- Website: www.sanluisaz.gov

San Luis is a city in Yuma County, Arizona, United States. The population was 35,257 at the 2020 census. It is part of the Yuma County Metropolitan Statistical Area. San Luis, located in the southwest corner of the state directly adjacent to Mexico's Federal Highway 2 at San Luis Río Colorado, Sonora, was the second fastest-growing city or town in Arizona from 1990 to 2000. According to 2025 Census Bureau estimates, the population of the city is 42,030.

== History ==
The city was established in 1930 with the opening of a border-crossing station. In the last twenty years it has registered an accelerated population increase, going from 1,946 inhabitants in 1980, to approximately 20,000 in the year 2005. The city annexed over 16,000 acres (65 km^{2}) of land between 2006 and 2012, thereby increasing the availability of land for residential, commercial and industrial growth in the eastern part of town where the new commercial port of entry will be constructed.

== Geography ==
San Luis is located adjacent to the U.S.-Mexico border, opposite San Luis Río Colorado, Sonora. The lowest point in Arizona (70 feet/21 meters) is located on the Colorado River in San Luis, where it flows out of Arizona and into Sonora.

According to the United States Census Bureau, the city has a total area of 26.5 square miles (68.63 km^{2}), of which 26.4 square miles (68.38 km^{2}) is land and 0.04 square miles (0.10 km^{2}) (0.11%) is water.

The Gulf of Santa Clara is located 70 miles (110 km) south of San Luis and sits on the northernmost point of the Gulf of California, at its confluence with the Colorado River.

=== Climate ===
Climate data for San Luis, Arizona
Month	Jan	Feb	Mar	Apr	May	Jun	Jul	Aug	Sep	Oct	Nov	Dec	Year
Record high °F (°C)	88 (31)	93 (34)	101 (38)	106 (41)	115 (46)	122 (50)	124 (51)	119 (48)	118 (48)	110 (43)	98 (37)	89 (32)	124 (51)
Mean daily maximum °F (°C)	70 (21)	73 (23)	79 (26)	86 (30)	94 (34)	102 (39)	106 (41)	105 (41)	101 (38)	90 (32)	77 (25)	68 (20)	88 (31)
Mean daily minimum °F (°C)	42 (6)	43 (6)	48 (9)	53 (12)	60 (16)	68 (20)	76 (24)	78 (26)	72 (22)	59 (15)	48 (9)	41 (5)	57 (14)
Record low °F (°C)	19 (−7)	21 (−6)	27 (−3)	34 (1)	35 (2)	50 (10)	56 (13)	52 (11)	43 (6)	33 (1)	26 (−3)	23 (−5)	19 (−7)
Average precipitation inches (mm)	0.38 (9.7)	0.37 (9.4)	0.32 (8.1)	0.12 (3.0)	0.06 (1.5)	0.06 (1.5)	0.49 (12)	0.38 (9.7)	0.45 (11)	0.18 (4.6)	0.16 (4.1)	0.72 (18)	3.69 (92.6)
Source: weather.com

== Demographics ==
Historical population
Census	Pop.	Note	%±
1970	189		—
1980	1,946		929.6%
1990	4,212		116.4%
2000	15,322		263.8%
2010	25,505		66.5%
2020	35,257		38.2%
2023 (est.)	37,966	▲	7.7%
U.S. Decennial Census

=== 2020 census ===
As of the 2020 census, San Luis had a population of 35,257. The median age was 31.7 years. 27.6% of residents were under the age of 18 and 7.5% of residents were 65 years of age or older. For every 100 females there were 126.7 males, and for every 100 females age 18 and over there were 136.4 males age 18 and over.

70.3% of residents lived in urban areas, while 29.7% lived in rural areas.

There were 7,685 households in San Luis, of which 60.8% had children under the age of 18 living in them. Of all households, 63.7% were married-couple households, 9.3% were households with a male householder and no spouse or partner present, and 22.8% were households with a female householder and no spouse or partner present. About 7.5% of all households were made up of individuals and 3.1% had someone living alone who was 65 years of age or older.

There were 7,966 housing units, of which 3.5% were vacant. The homeowner vacancy rate was 0.3% and the rental vacancy rate was 3.5%.

Racial composition as of the 2020 census
Race	Number	Percent
White	8,190	23.2%
Black or African American	969	2.7%
American Indian and Alaska Native	415	1.2%
Asian	27	0.1%
Native Hawaiian and Other Pacific Islander	8	0.0%
Some other race	13,968	39.6%
Two or more races	11,680	33.1%
Hispanic or Latino (of any race)	31,749	90.1%

=== 2000 census ===
As of the census of 2000, there were 15,322 people, 6,525 households and 2,876 families residing in the city. The population density was 796.3 people per square mile. There were 3,325 housing units at an average density of 125.8 per square mile (48.6/km^{2}). The racial makeup of the city was 63.2 White, 0.3% Black or African American, 1.5% Native American, 0.2% Asian, and 2.8% from two or more races. 98.7% of the population were Hispanic or Latino of any race.

There were 5,953 households, out of which 71.5% had children under the age of 18 living with them, 72.1% were married couples living together, 19.8% had a female householder with no husband present and 7.1% were non-families. 3.9% of all households were made up of individuals, and 5.7% had someone living alone who was 65 years of age or older. The average household size was 4.20 and the average family size was 4.33.

In the city, the population was spread out, with 35.6% under the age of 18, 12.9% from 18 to 24, 34.1% from 25 to 44, 13.4% from 45 to 64, and 4.0% who were 65 years of age or older. The median age was 26 years. For every 100 females, there were 126.5 males. For every 100 females age 18 and over, there were 144.6 males.

The median income for a household in the city was $30,637 and the median income for a family was $22,368. Males had a median income of $20,770 versus $14,149 for females. The per capita income for the city was $5,377. About 36.3% of families and 35.8% of the population were below the poverty line, including 38.5% of those under age 18 and 44.3% of those age 65 or over.

== Economy ==
Retail trade, agriculture and manufacturing form a large portion of the local economy. Another significant segment is the light industry located on both sides of the U.S./Mexico border. San Luis is an excellent site for labor-intensive manufacturing and assembly plants.

San Luis is contiguous with the neighboring San Luis Rio Colorado, Sonora. The San Luis I Land Port of Entry is the main transportation crossing between the two cities, connecting US Highway 95, Mexican Federal Highway 2, and Sonora State Highway 40. Together they share the San Luis cotton growing area.

Arizona State Prison Complex – Yuma is located on the corner of Avenue B and Cesar Chavez Boulevard, in San Luis. ASPC-Yuma provides housing to an average population of 2,279 convicted male felons. ASPC–Yuma is also a major employer in Yuma County, employing 755 full-time employees. Moreover, it is a provider of inmate work crews utilized by members of local, state and community organizations. Among other duties, ASPC-Yuma has a Wildland Fire Crew that consists of one sergeant, two correctional officers and twenty inmates that assists in fighting fires throughout Arizona.

San Luis Detention Facility was opened in 2007. The facility is owned by the San Luis Detention Facility Development Corporation, a subsidiary of the city, and is operated by LaSalle Corrections. The facility is located on the eastern edge of the city near the Arizona State Prison Complex. It has 464 beds to hold detainees, primarily for violations of immigration laws, from federal authorities. Approximately 80 full-time employees are employed by the facility.

=== Top employers ===
According to the City's 2014 Comprehensive Annual Financial Report, the top employers in San Luis are:

#	Employer	# of Employees
1	Gadsden Elementary School District	845
2	ACT Advanced Call Center Technologies	812
3	Arizona State Prison Complex – Yuma	800
4	Factor Sales	396
5	Walmart	297
6	City of San Luis	243
7	San Luis Regional Detention Center	123

== Sports ==
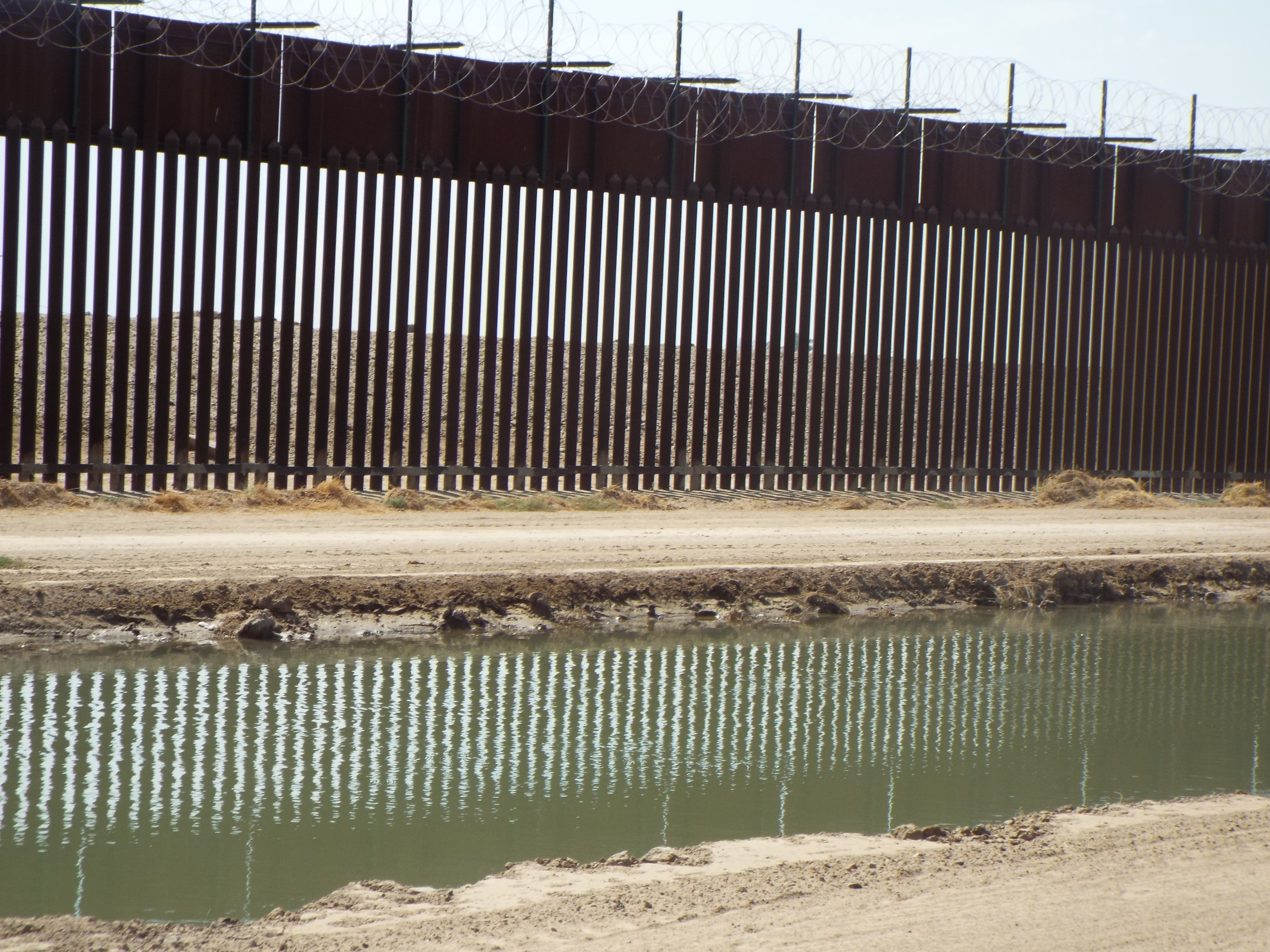
Border wall between the United States and Mexico in San Luis

San Luis has become the new home of an Arizona Winter League independent professional baseball franchise, the San Luis Atleticos, which began play in January 2009. The team represents not only their home city, but Mexico as well.

== Government ==
The city of San Luis uses a Council-Manager form of government, where the seven-member council appoints a city manager, city attorney, city engineer, city magistrate, chief of police and fire chief. The mayor is Nieves Riedel, and the city manager is Jenny Torres.

From 1996 to 2006, the city was in a plagued by a wave of recalls. The City had six different mayors in a 10-year period and went through almost two dozen council members during that time.

In January 2012, the city made national news when Alejandrina Cabrera, a city council candidate, was banned from running for office because it was claimed that she was not proficient enough in English. Yuma County Superior Judge John Nelson issued an order on January 25 stating that Cabrera's name be stricken from the ballot. Mayor Juan Carlos Escamilla had filed a lawsuit requesting that the court determine Cabrera's qualification to run for office based on her English skills. Cabrera had previously launched two unsuccessful recall campaigns against Escamilla, after the council raised utility rates. She claimed that the lawsuit was politically motivated. The issue was of national importance because it was reminiscent of Jim Crow Laws enacted in the southern United States between 1876 and 1965.

== Education ==
=== Public schools ===
Gadsden Elementary School District:

- Arizona Desert Elementary School
- Cesar Chavez Elementary School
- Desert View Elementary School
- Ed Pastor Elementary
- Gadsden Elementary School
- Rio Colorado Elementary School
- San Luis Middle School
- Southwest Junior High School

Somerton Elementary School District:

- Sun Valley Elementary School

Yuma Union High School District:

- San Luis High School

PPEP TEC High Schools:

- Cesar Chavez Learning Center

=== Private schools ===
Harvest Preparatory Academy, a private elementary school, is located in San Luis.

=== Higher education ===
Arizona Western College operates a campus in San Luis.

== Media ==
=== Newspapers ===
- Bajo el Sol is a weekly newspaper
- San Luis AZ News, a local weekly.

== Infrastructure ==
=== Transportation ===
San Luis is served by Yuma County Area Transit, which connects with Greyhound Lines in Yuma.

U.S. Route 95 connects the city to Yuma, as does Arizona State Route 195. The San Luis Port of Entry and the San Luis II Port of Entry for trucks and commercial vehicles connect the town to San Luis Río Colorado, Sonora, Mexico.
