= Dome, Arizona =

Ghost town in Yuma County, Arizona

- Ghost town
- Location within Arizona Location within the United States
- Coordinates: 32°45′19″N 114°21′44″W
- Country: United States
- State: Arizona
- County: Yuma
- Founded: 1858
- Abandoned: 1940
- Elevation: 194 ft (59 m)

Population (2011)
  - Total: 0
- Time zone: UTC-7 (MST (no DST))
- Post Office opened: December 24, 1858
- Post Office closed: July 14, 1863

Dome (O'odham: Hi:lo) is a ghost town located in Yuma County, in southwestern Arizona, United States. It is located in the Dome Valley south of the Gila River. Originally Swiveler's Station, 20 miles (32 km) east of Fort Yuma on the Butterfield Overland Mail route, a post office was established here in 1858. It was first under the name of Gila City, the nearby boomtown one and a half miles (2.4 km) west of Swiveler's, but the post office closed July 14, 1863, after most of the town was swept away in the Great Flood of 1862, and then abandoned for the La Paz gold rush along the Colorado River. After the railroad passed by the site and an attempt at large scale mining of the placers began, a new post office was established as Dome in 1892 but soon closed when the attempt failed. Subsequently it opened and closed several times before finally closing in 1940.

Today the site lies along the Union Pacific's Sunset Route and a road that follows the old Overland stage route, south of the Wellton-Mohawk canal and Gila River. All that remains on the site is a large adobe building, one small adobe remnant and foundations. There is a cemetery nearby to the west.
