= U.S. Route 80 in New Mexico =

Segment of American highway

U.S. Highway 80
- 1951 alignment of US 80 highlighted in red

Route information
- Maintained by NMDOT
- Length: 191 mi (307 km) Mileage reflects US 80 as it was in 1951.
- Existed: November 11, 1926–October 12, 1991
- History: Western terminus in Anthony after 1989

Major intersections (in 1951)
- West end: US 80 at the Arizona state line
- NM 9 near Rodeo; NM 14 in Road Forks; US 70 from Lordsburg to Las Cruces; NM 180 in Lordsburg; NM 81 near Wilna; US 260 / NM 11 in Deming; US 85 from Las Cruces to Anthony; NM 28 in Las Cruces
- East end: US 80 / US 85 in Anthony

Location
- Country: United States
- State: New Mexico
- Counties: Hidalgo, Grant, Luna, Doña Ana

Highway system
- United States Numbered Highway System; List; Special; Divided; New Mexico State Highway System; Interstate; US; State; Scenic
← NM 78	→ NM 80

U.S. Route 80 (US 80) was a major transcontinental highway in the U.S. state of New Mexico from November 11, 1926, to October 12, 1991. Nationally, US 80 stretched from San Diego, California to Tybee Island, Georgia, going through southern New Mexico from El Paso, Texas, through the towns of Las Cruces, Deming and Lordsburg before entering Arizona. US 80 was completely replaced by Interstate 10. State Road 80 is a remnant of this route.

== Route description ==
US 80 entered New Mexico at the Texas state line in Anthony. Prior to 1956, US 80 used the current routing of SH 20 and NM 478. From there, US 80 continued north through Berino and Vado into Las Cruces. After 1956, US 80 followed present day NM 460 and the western I-10 frontage road, before rejoining the older alignment in Las Cruces.

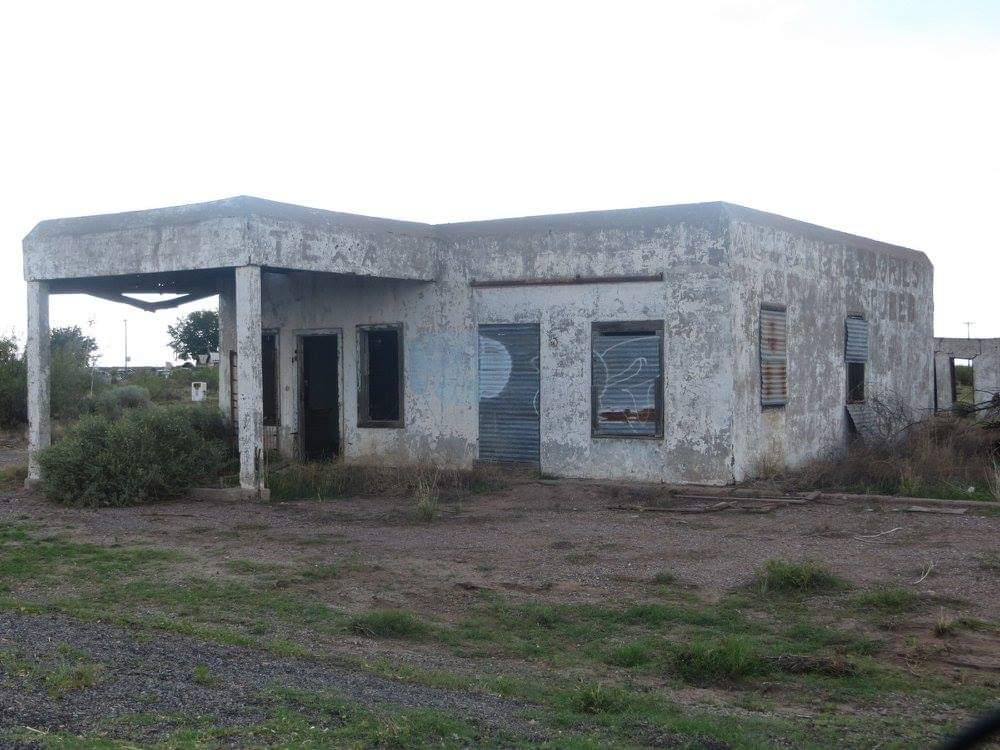
An abandoned 1930s Texaco gas station on NM 418 (old US 70/US 80) west of Deming.

Originally, US 80 continued north on Main Street through the heart of downtown Las Cruces. For a while, the city made Main Street into a Pedestrian street. As of 2016, Main Street is no longer pedestrian only and is now passable by car. From Main, US 80 used Las Cruces Avenue, Hadley Avenue, Valley Drive and Picacho Avenue (US 70) to head west out of Las Cruces. At later dates, US 80 bypassed this route and took Main Street straight to Picacho Avenue. US 80 continued west on Picacho Avenue to I-10. Airport Road, the north frontage road was part of US 80. Past Exit 127, US 80 took I-10's current routing to Exit 116.

The older routing took NM 549 west. NM 549 passes over the Union Pacific Railroad at the ghost town of Cambray before continuing northeast for a few miles before intersecting again with I-10. NM 549 curves along the southern end of the Interstate, while the original alignment of US 80 took a different path. This bisected road is still accessible by crossing I-10 at Exit 102 and taking Micro Road northeast to the now abandoned alignment. US 80 continued west on NM 549 then west on I-10 Business Loop and through Deming, New Mexico. In 1926, US 80 used Doña Ana Road, De Baca Road and NM 377 before rejoining NM 549. The later routing of US 80 used I-10 from Exit 116 to the I-10 Business Loop.

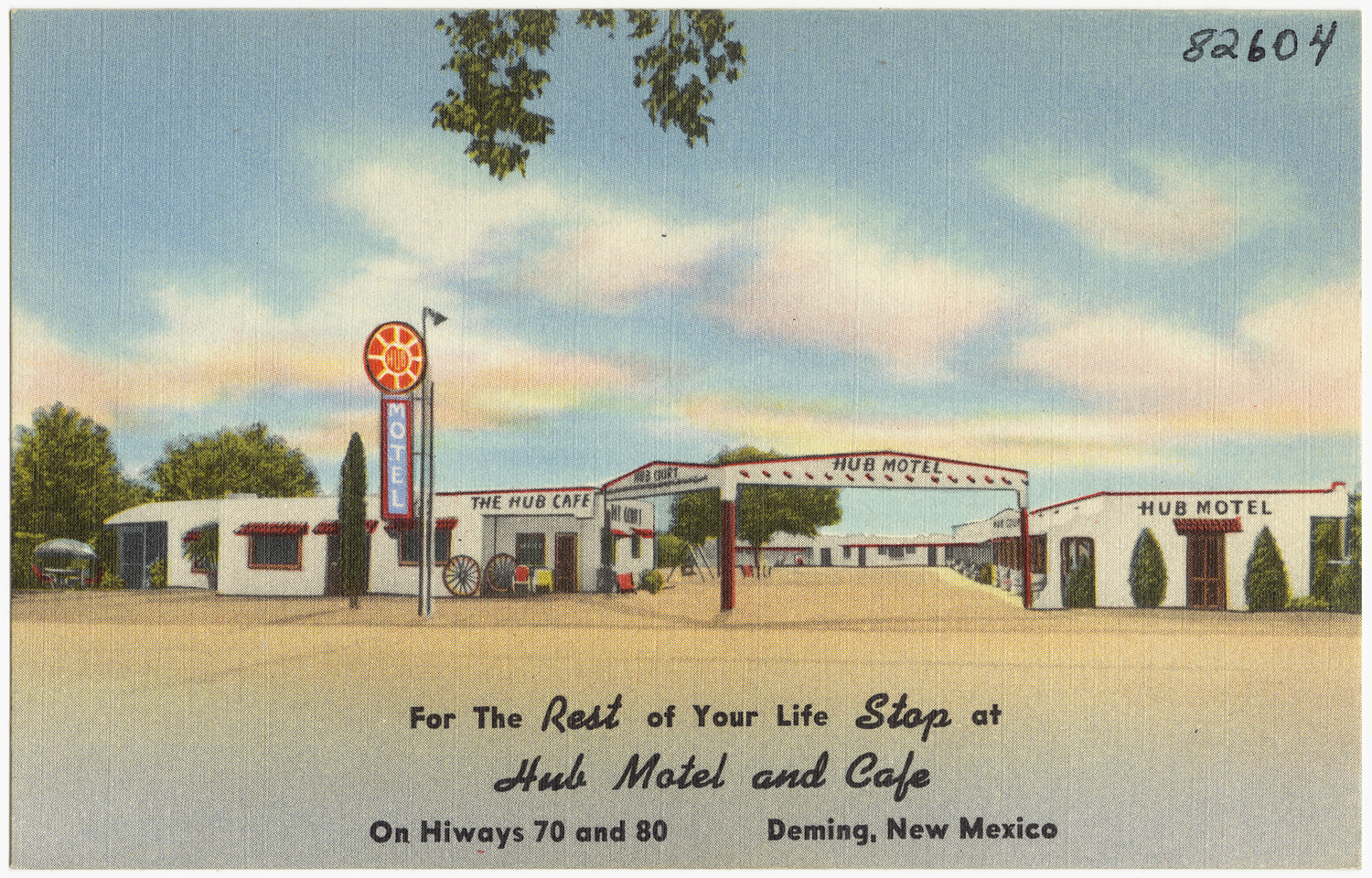
Postcard of the Hub Motel and Cafe on US 70 and US 80 in Deming.

Though US 80 later took Pine Street through town and followed I-10 west towards Lordsburg, New Mexico. The roadbed of this route sometimes appears as frontage roads on the northern and southern sides of the Interstate. The older alignment followed Spruce Street west then took NM 418 out of town to Exit 62. Along I-10 heading west to Lordsburg, sections of old US 80 are sometimes visible on the northern side of the Interstate next to the railroad tracks. In Lordsburg, US 80 took Motel Drive through town before returning to the route of I-10. There are some old motels and businesses from the era of US 80 left within Lordsburg. An older abandoned US 80 is still visible between I-10 and the railroad tracks west of town.

In Road Forks, I-10 splits away from US 80 which headed south. I-10 between Road Forks and Arizona was once NM 14, which along with SR 86 in Arizona, created a time saving bypass around US 80 between Road Forks and Benson, Arizona. Today, what was US 80 between Arizona and Road Forks is now known as NM 80. Older sections of highway can be viewed alongside the current road, including an old gradual curve in Rodeo. South of Rodeo, US 80 travelled across the Arizona state line and continued west along SR 80 to Douglas.

== History ==
Early US 80 sign.

Beginning in 1909, New Mexico started using a numbering system for its highways. The first of these was New Mexico Territorial Road 1 (later State Road 1 or NM 1). NM 1 was joined by NM 4 the same year. NM 1 ran from the Texas state line in Anthony north to the Colorado state line near Raton. Further to the west, NM 4 ran from the Arizona state line near Rodeo to a junction with NM 1 in Las Cruces. By 1923, the western end of NM 4 was truncated to Lordsburg. The route between Lordsburg and Rodeo was taken over by NM 42. In 1917, the Dixie Overland Highway was established from San Diego, California to Savannah, Georgia, extending through New Mexico. This auto trail entered New Mexico from the east through Texas, going through Roswell back into Texas to El Paso, before heading back into New Mexico through Mesilla Park, Deming and Lordsburg before aiming southwest into Arizona towards Douglas. Between 1920 and 1923, the Dixie Overland was joined by the Bankhead and Old Spanish Trail highways west of El Paso.

By 1925, the Joint Board on Interstate Highways under the Secretary of Agriculture and American Association of State Highway Officials (AASHO), proposed a numbered transcontinental highway system across the country. The proposed system was approved on November 11, 1926. All of NM 4, part of NM 42, the southernmost section of NM 1 became part of U.S. Route 80. Child route US 180 was established between US 80 in Arizona and US 85 in Caballo. The state highway system within New Mexico was renumbered and reworked extensively to accommodate the new U.S. Highway System by 1927 into well marked State Road system. Many overlapping State Road designations along the new U.S. Highways were truncated or eliminated. NM 1 was greatly truncated to make way for US 80 and US 85 while NM 4 and NM 42 were fully decommissioned in favor of US 80 and US 180.

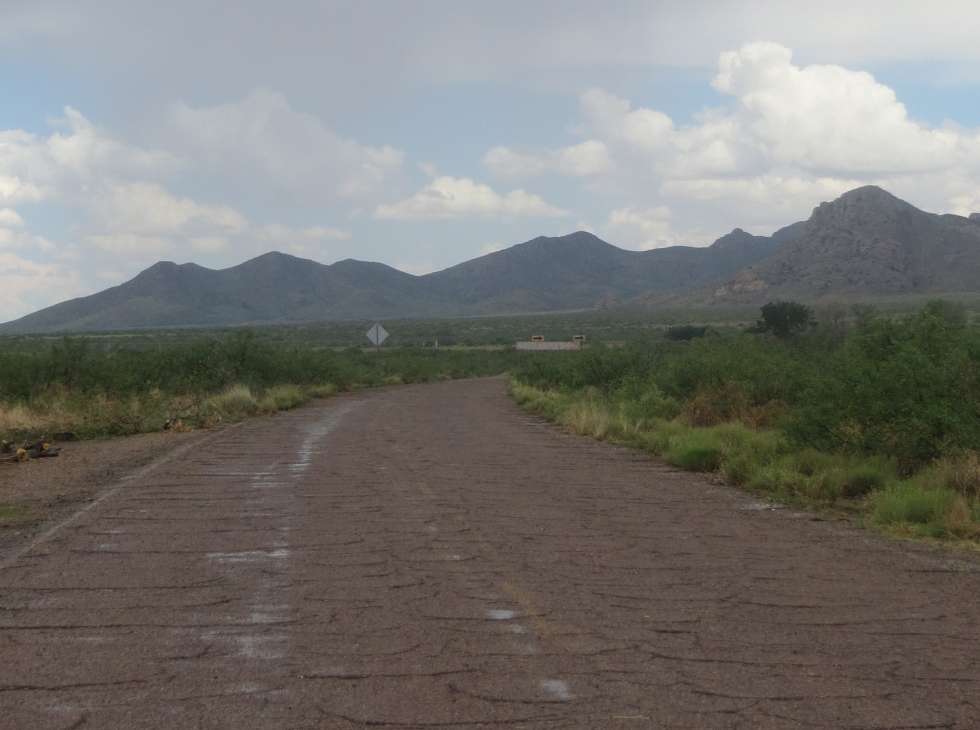
An abandoned section of 1960s US 80 in Rodeo.

Changes to the routing of US 80 began in 1926. An older routing to Cambray via Aden from Mesilla Park was abandoned in favor of a route through Las Cruces. Between 1930 and 1935, US 70 was realigned heavily due to the extension of US 60 into New Mexico. The re-routing made US 70 concurrent with US 80 between Lordsburg and Las Cruces and eliminated the original US 180. US 260 was established along part the earlier route of US 70 and NM 11 to US 80 in Deming. From 1934 to 1935, the route was slightly altered between Arizona and Road Forks, eliminating an exceptionally long curve over the railroad tracks in Rodeo for a more modest curve into town. The route between Cambray and Deming was also straightened out. US 80 was moved onto a newer road further south from the railroad tracks and straightened out between Road Forks and Deming.

In 1943, US 180 was re-established heading west through part of New Mexico along US 62 to US 80 in El Paso. On October 7, 1961, US 180 was extended over US 80 from El Paso to Deming and replaced US 260. In the 1950s, a new section of US 80 was constructed around the older route between Anthony and Las Cruces, bypassing many of the towns along the Rio Grande. Two further new sections were constructed between Lordsburg and Las Cruces, bypassing the route through Cambray between Deming and Las Cruces and the older alignment from Gage to Deming.

Establishing the Interstate Highway system marked the beginning of the end for US 80. By 1965, Interstate 10 had replaced large sections of US 80. Between 1964 and 1969, US 80 was removed entirely from California. Arizona followed by retiring most of its portion of US 80 on October 28, 1977. On October 6, 1989, the AASHTO approved Arizona and New Mexico's request to remove US 80 from Arizona and most of New Mexico. US 80 had its western terminus truncated to Anthony near the Texas border. In 1991, both New Mexico and Texas requested the removal of US 80 between Anthony and Dallas, citing US 80 as being un-needed, due to being consistently multiplexed with I-10, I-20 and I-30. On October 12, 1991, the AASHTO agreed to this proposal and truncated US 80 to its current western terminus at I-30 in Dallas, Texas.

== Major intersections ==
This list follows the 1951 alignment.

County	Location	mi	km	Destinations	Notes
Hidalgo	Rodeo	0	0.0	US 80 west – Douglas	Arizona state line
Hidalgo	Rodeo	8	13	NM 9 east – Columbus	
Hidalgo	Road Forks	32	51	NM 14 west – Steins	NM 14 continued into Arizona as SR 86 west – Tucson
Hidalgo	Lordsburg	49	79	NM 180 east – Silver City	
Hidalgo	Lordsburg	49	79	US 70 west to Arizona	Western terminus of concurrency with US 70
Grant		75	121	NM 81 south – Hachita	
Luna	Deming	109	175	US 260 west – Hurley	
Luna	Deming	109	175	NM 11 south – Columbus	
Doña Ana	Las Cruces	168	270	US 70 east – Alamogordo	Eastern terminus of concurrency with US 70
Doña Ana	Las Cruces	168	270	US 85 north – Truth Or Consequences	Northern terminus of concurrency with US 85
Doña Ana	Las Cruces	169	272	NM 28 south – Mesilla	
Doña Ana	Anthony	192	309	US 80 east / US 85 south – El Paso	Texas state line
1.000 mi = 1.609 km; 1.000 km = 0.621 mi: Concurrency terminus

== See also ==
- U.S. Route 66 in New Mexico

U.S. Route 80
Previous state: Arizona	New Mexico	Next state: Texas
