= U.S. Route 80 =

Numbered Highway in the United States

U.S. Route 80
- US 80 highlighted in red

Route information
- Length: 1,035 mi (1,666 km)
- Existed: November 11, 1926–present
- History: Original terminus at US 101 in San Diego, CA. Truncated to Dallas, TX by 1991.

Major junctions
- West end: I-30 / US 67 on the Dallas–Mesquite, TX city line
- I-20 / I-59 in Meridian, MS; I-65 / I-85 in Montgomery, AL; I-185 in Columbus, GA; I-75 in Macon, GA; I-16 in Macon, GA; I-95 in Pooler, GA
- East end: SR 26 / Butler Avenue/Inlet Avenue/Tybrisa Street on Tybee Island, GA

Location
- Country: United States
- States: Texas, Louisiana, Mississippi, Alabama, Georgia

Highway system
- United States Numbered Highway System; List; Special; Divided
← US 79	→ US 81

U.S. Route 80 or U.S. Highway 80 (US 80) is a major east–west United States Numbered Highway in the Southern United States, much of which was once part of the early auto trail known as the Dixie Overland Highway. As the "0" in the route number indicates, it was originally a cross-country route, from the Pacific Ocean to the Atlantic Ocean. Its original western terminus was at Historic US 101 in San Diego, California. However, the entire segment west of Dallas, Texas, has been decommissioned in favor of various Interstate Highways and state highways starting in 1967, being truncated to its current west end in 1991. Currently, the highway's western terminus is at an interchange with Interstate 30 (I-30) on the Dallas–Mesquite city line. Its eastern terminus is on Tybee Island, Georgia, near the Atlantic Ocean. Between Longview, Texas, and Cuba, Alabama, US 80 runs parallel to or concurrently with Interstate 20. It also currently runs through Dallas, Texas; Shreveport, Louisiana; Jackson, Mississippi; Montgomery, Alabama; Columbus, Georgia; Macon, Georgia; and Savannah, Georgia.

== Route description ==
Lengths
	mi	km
TX	161	259
LA	199	320
MS	157	253
AL	218	351
GA	300	483
Total	1,035	1,666

=== Texas ===
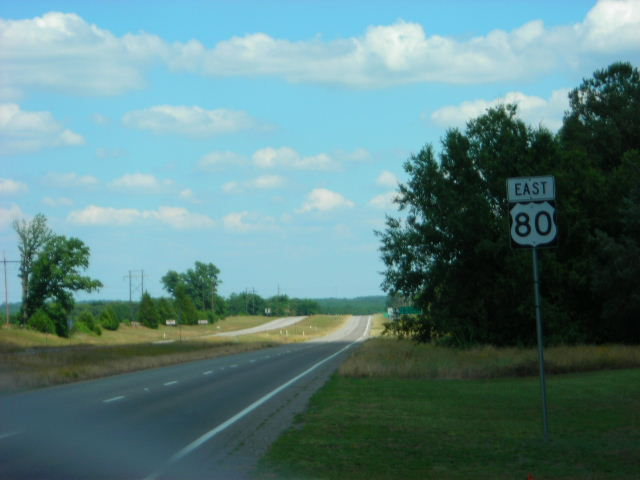
US 80 eastbound in rural Texas

Modern US 80 begins as a significant component of the urban freeway system of Dallas, Texas. With Spur 557, it serves as the shortest freeway route from the central and northern portions of Dallas to I-20, heading east towards Shreveport, Louisiana.

From its origin at I-30 in eastern Dallas, through its interchange with the I-635 "LBJ" Loop, to its junction with I-20 southwest of Terrell, US 80/Spur 557 is a full Interstate-grade, limited-access freeway. (This freeway was originally built as I-20 but was rerouted south of Dallas in 1971 and 1991.) In western Terrell, US 80 leaves the freeway, which continues southeast as Spur 557 to I-20, while US 80 runs north of I-20 through a number of small towns and cities, including Terrell, Mineola, Longview, and Marshall. It rejoins I-20 for about five miles (8.0 km), before splitting to pass through downtown Waskom before crossing into Louisiana.

=== Louisiana ===
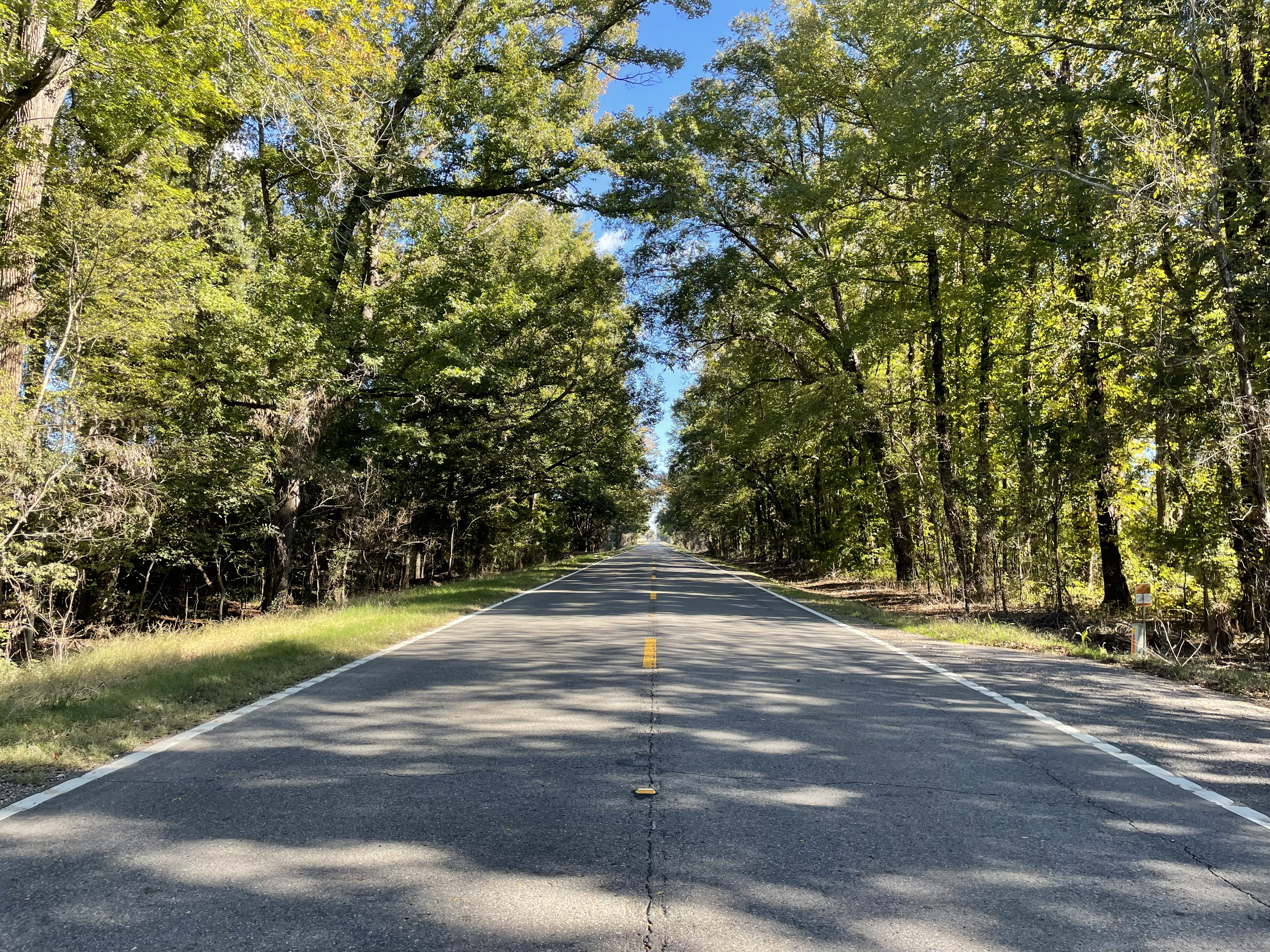
US 80 east in Madison Parish, Louisiana

US 80 is parallel to the newer I-20, which has supplanted it as a long-distance route, for the entirety of its length in Louisiana.

The highway crosses the state line from Texas into Caddo Parish as a two-lane road and crosses over to the south of I-20 without connecting with the freeway. It passes through the town of Greenwood where it meets US 79 coming north from Texas, and these two routes run concurrently eastward from there to Minden. US 79/US 80 crosses over I-20 again, this time at an interchange, and enters the city of Shreveport as Greenwood Road. The highway passes over I-220 without an interchange and continues east to an intersection with Jefferson Paige Road where it expands to four undivided lanes and enters the main part of the urbanized area. US 171 ends at US 79/US 80 at the intersection with Hearne Avenue. At this intersection, the road narrows to two through lanes. US 80 intersects I-20 again just east of here. At Mansfield Road (old US 171), the highway name changes to Texas Avenue and angles northeast through an industrial area. The road skirts the I-20/I-49 interchange and expands to four lanes for its final approach to downtown. At the west edge of downtown, eastbound jogs one block east on Crockett Street and two blocks north on Common Street north to Texas Street; westbound jogs one block south from Texas Street down Common to Texas Avenue. US 79/US 80 passes through downtown Shreveport on Texas Street before crossing the Red River on the 1930s vintage Long–Allen Bridge and entering Bossier City and Bossier Parish.

Through Bossier Parish, US 79/US 80 comprises a major urban and suburban arterial (East Texas Street) carrying a minimum of four lanes. In the eastern reaches of the parish, and continuing into Webster Parish, it is a divided highway. The road intersects the east end of I-220 at an interchange. US 79/US 80 stays to the north of I-20, except for a stretch east of Haughton where it strays to the south for a period, skirting the north edge of the Louisiana Army Ammunition Plant. At Dixie Inn, the highway intersects US 371. In Minden, US 79 separates from US 80 and continues its northeasterly trajectory toward Arkansas.

East of Minden, US 80 crosses to the south of I-20 and serves the Bienville Parish towns of Gibsland and Arcadia. Entering Lincoln Parish, the highway serves Simsboro and Grambling before entering Ruston (via West California Avenue) and overlapping US 167 on a north–south couplet of streets (Vienna Street/Trenton Street) through the business district. US 80 resumes its eastward path on the north side of Ruston and exits the city on East Georgia Avenue.

Between Ruston and Monroe the highway serves the small communities of Choudrant and Calhoun. Now on the north side of the interstate, it enters Ouachita Parish and approaches the Monroe area as a two-lane road. US 80 crosses Louisiana Highway 143 (LA 143) and enters West Monroe on Cypress Street, where it continues south into the business district and widens to a four-lane urban arterial. At junction LA 34 (Bridge Street), US 80 makes a left turn, angling northeast, and crosses the Ouachita River, entering the city of Monroe. As Louisville Avenue it passes north of downtown, but the downtown area can be accessed via Business US 165 which intersects US 80 at North 5th/North 6th Street and becomes concurrent from there to the east. Louisville Avenue rapidly becomes a heavily commercialized urban arterial and remains so as it passes through the city, eventually curving southwestward and meeting the intersection with Desiard Street.

As Desiard Street, US 80 immediately meets mainline US 165, on its expressway bypass alignment, at a diamond interchange. Eastward from there, US 80 passes through suburban areas until it meets LA 139, where it is forced to turn off its four-lane alignment at an intersection which favors LA 139 traffic. Now a two-lane road, US 80 continues east through northeast Louisiana, passing through Richland and Madison parishes and serving the communities and towns of Start, Rayville (intersection with US 425), Delhi (intersection with LA 17), Tallulah (intersection with U.S. Route 65), Mound, and Delta.

Just west of Delta, US 80 turns off its original route and runs a short distance south to an interchange with I-20. The original alignment of US 80 into Delta is now designated as LA 3218. The original US 80 Mississippi River Bridge remains active as a rail bridge but the roadway portion is closed to traffic. Today, US 80 runs concurrent with the interstate around Delta to the state line, bypassing the town and crossing the Mississippi River bridge into Vicksburg, Mississippi.

=== Mississippi ===
In Mississippi, US 80 is referred to as "Highway 80" and exists primarily as a two-lane road except in the Jackson area, where it expands to four lanes.

US 80 out of Louisiana runs concurrently with I-20 across the Mississippi River through Vicksburg, to Clinton. When US 80 reaches the western edge of Clinton, it separates to pass directly through the cities of Clinton, Jackson, Flowood, Pearl, and Brandon. After Brandon, US 80 runs parallel to I-20 for the next 100 miles (160 km) through the towns of Pelahatchie, Morton, Forest, Lake, Newton, Hickory, and Chunky. East of Chunky, US 80 once again merges with I-20 until it separates again in Meridian, where it merges with US 11 as a two-lane highway heading through the town of Toomsuba and finally ending at the Alabama state line.

=== Alabama ===
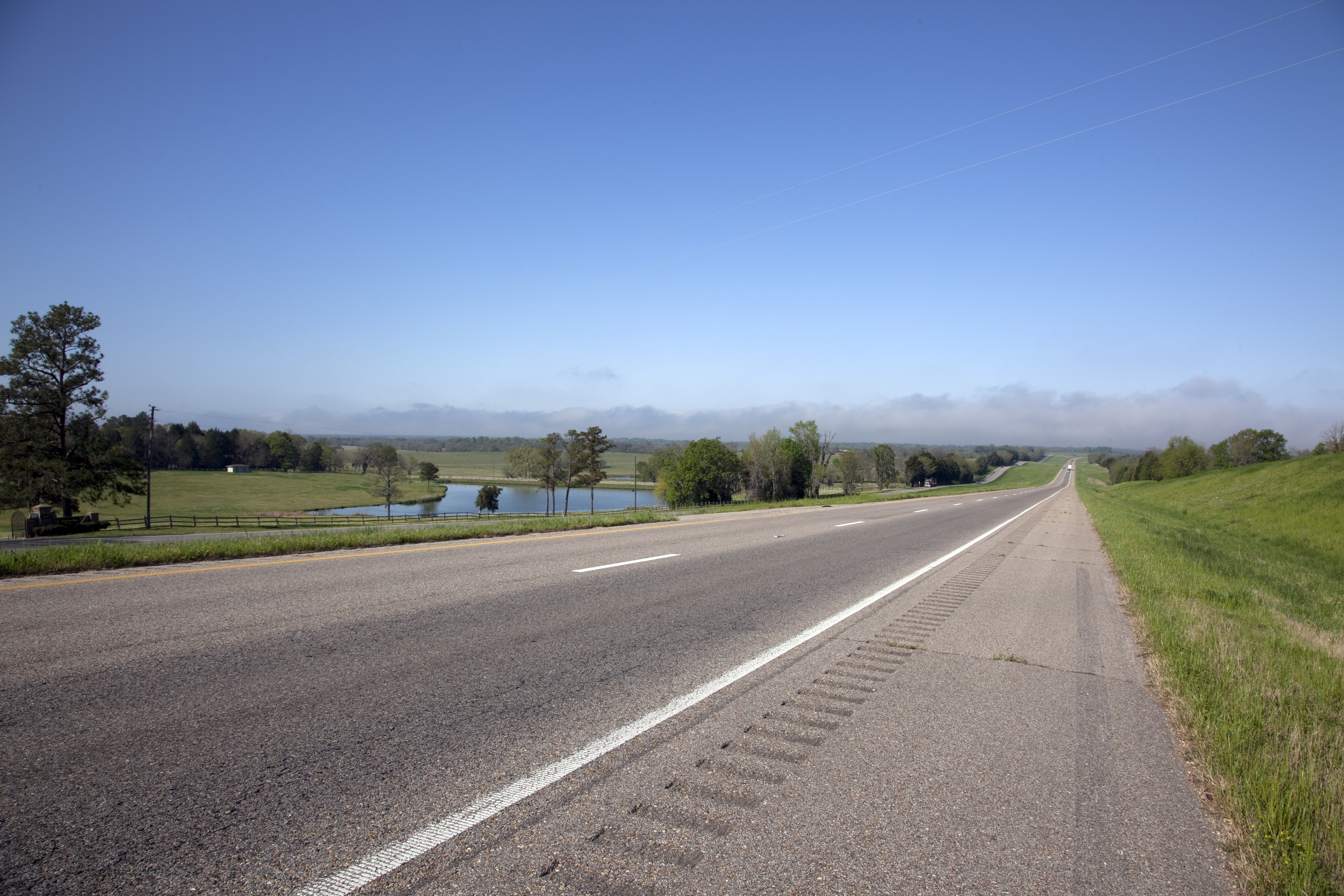
US 80 through Lowndes County, Alabama.

In Alabama, US 80 enters the state near and parallel with I-20 in Cuba. It is co-signed with US 11 until it splits at Cuba and runs east across the center of the state. It is a major highway through Alabama, going through Demopolis and Selma. It continues to Montgomery, where it continues east through Shorter and Tuskegee and leaves the state in Phenix City.

The routing from Meridian, Mississippi to Cuba, Alabama originally ran along its current route but for some 30 years it traveled along I-20 and I-59. However, the routing reverted to the original road early in the 2000s. It is internally designated by the Alabama Department of Transportation as State Route 8 (SR 8).

=== Georgia ===
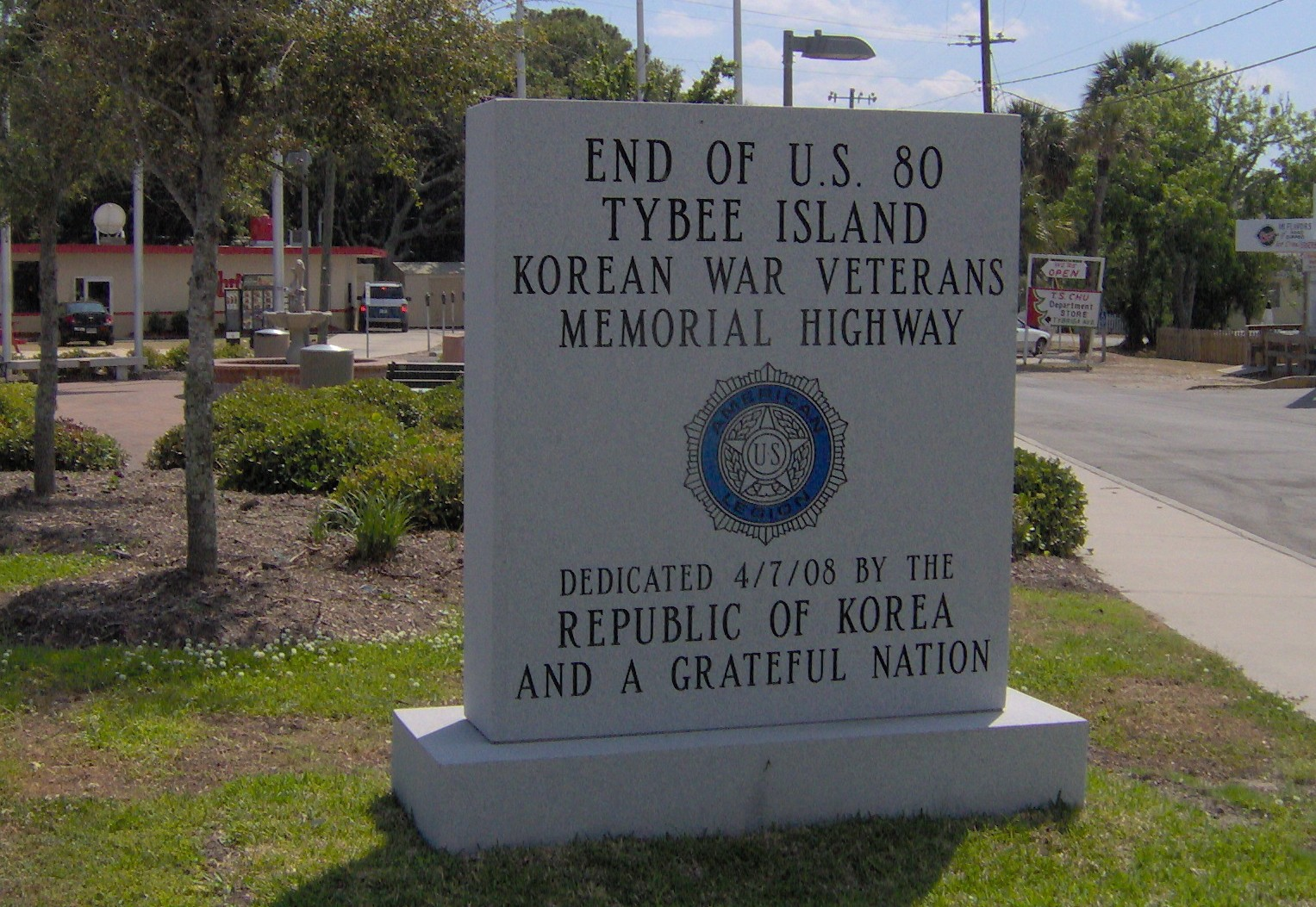
The end of US 80 on Tybee Island

US 80 crosses the Chattahoochee River from Alabama into Columbus, where it proceeds along J. R. Allen Parkway through the northern section of the city. Past Columbus, the road meanders through rural Georgia for roughly 50 miles (80 km) en route to Macon, where it crosses I-75 and I-16. US 80 passes through downtown Macon via Eisenhower Parkway and parallels the northern boundary of Ocmulgee National Monument just east of the city.

Beyond Macon, US 80 turns southeastward, passing through the cities of Dublin, Swainsboro and Statesboro and running roughly parallel to I-16. On the outskirts of Savannah, US 80 crosses I-95 and follows Louisville Road into the city's downtown area. After briefly merging with I-516, US 80 continues eastward along Victory Drive, just south of Savannah's historic district. At the community of Thunderbolt, US 80 crosses the Wilmington River and proceeds across the islands and marshes along the Atlantic Coast east of Savannah. There it crosses the Lazaretto Creek onto Tybee Island. The final stretch of US 80 follows Butler Avenue across Tybee Island. A small monument at the intersection of Butler and Tybrisa Street marks the end of the highway.

== History ==
Official Dixie Overland Highway sign from 1918

Established in 1914 by the Automobile Club of Savannah, the Dixie Overland Highway auto trail was the first major route connecting San Diego, California and Savannah, Georgia. The Dixie Overland Highway Association debated on a definitive western end point for the highway in southern California. California politicians Stanley Hufflund and Ed Fletcher convinced the association in an August 1918 meeting to choose San Diego over Los Angeles. Fletcher was responsible for a grassroots campaign years earlier that resulted in the construction of the Plank Road across the Algodones Dunes in 1915. The Plank Road was the final link in the main highway to San Diego. The association agreed to make San Diego the Dixie Overland Highway's western terminus in 1919 and elected Fletcher as the association's president. The highway now followed most of what would become US 80, except between Sweetwater, Texas and El Paso. The section of future US 80 through Odessa, Midland and Abilene was instead part of the Bankhead Highway. Other sections of future US 80 were designated as parts of the Lee Highway and the Old Spanish Trail.

In April 1925, the Secretary of Agriculture established the Joint Board on Interstate Highways under the United States Bureau of Public Roads. The board began planning what would become the United States Numbered Highway System. One of the planned highways was US 80 between Savannah and San Diego. The board's highway system proposal was submitted by the Secretary of Agriculture to the newly formed American Association of State Highway Officials (AASHO), which made changes and revisions to the route before adopting the finalized system. On November 11, 1926, all the proposed highways in the system, including US 80, were officially designated. Ed Fletcher continued his involvement with the route after it became US 80, becoming president of the newly formed US 80 Highway Association. During his time with the association, Fletcher lobbied the federal government to pay for improvements to the highway and actively promoted US 80 to motorists.

US 80 was advertised as the first all-weather coast-to-coast route for auto travelers. Originally, its western terminus was in San Diego at US 101, and its eastern terminus in Savannah at US 17. When first commissioned, the highway was approximately 2,726 miles (4,387 km). By 1931, it had been shortened to 2,671 miles (4,299 km) and the eastern terminus extended to Tybee Island. According to the United States Department of Agriculture Bureau of Public Roads, only 798 miles (1,284 km) were considered "improved" roadway in 1931, being paved with brick, concrete or macadam. The remainder was surfaced of lesser materials such as gravel or dirt. In 1947, the U.S. Highway 80 Association (not to be confused with Fletcher's earlier organization) was founded to promote business and tourism along US 80 from Savannah to San Diego. Tourism and travel had sharply declined on the entire route since the 1930s. In 1949, the Association was divided into three divisions: The western division, in Tucson, Arizona; the central, in Colorado City, Texas; and the eastern, in Ruston, Louisiana. The U.S. Highway 80 Association resolved to offer membership to businesses along the route, print promotional booklets and strip maps, and pay for billboard ads to attract tourists to drive US 80 from coast to coast. The Association hoped it would also induce travelers on U.S. Route 66 to consider US 80 instead.

Throughout the 1950s, US 80 grew to become a popular highway that often competed with US 66. At one point, more cars were recorded entering California on US 80 than on US 66. Like US 66, US 80 become a keystone highway in American car culture. This renaissance was short-lived, however, with the creation of the Interstate and Defense Highway System in 1957. Four Interstates were slated to replace US 80 as a major highway: Interstate 8 between San Diego and Yuma, Arizona; Interstate 10 between Tucson and Pecos, Texas; Interstate 20 between Pecos and Meridian, Mississippi; and Interstate 16 between Macon, Georgia and Savannah. Between 1964 and 1991, US 80 was slowly removed in increments between Dallas and San Diego. It was considered obsolete to the western states, which favored the new Interstate highways. As such, US 80 is no longer an active U.S. Highway in California, Arizona, New Mexico and western Texas. Today, I-8, I-10 and I-20 have replaced US 80 between Dallas and San Diego. Notable surviving sections of old US 80 include the entirety of both New Mexico State Road 80 and Arizona State Route 80, and all of County Route S80 in Imperial County, California. Other former sections of US 80, particularly in California and parts of Arizona, carry the title Old Highway 80 or similar variations of that name. Multiple efforts are being made to designate whole sections of US 80 as an historic route. California became the first state to recognize Historic U.S. Route 80 in 2007. As of 2018, California, Arizona and Louisiana recognize former and current sections of US 80 as an historic route.

For a time known as the "Broadway of America", US 80's history is second only to US 66 in American highway folklore, as several significant historical events have occurred on or near US 80. Bonnie and Clyde were ambushed on LA 154, just south of US 80 near Gibsland, Louisiana. Coincidentally, Clyde Barrow was buried with his brother just off former US 80 in Dallas. Lee Harvey Oswald was captured at the Texas Theatre on Jefferson Street in Oak Cliff, which at the time was a business spur of US 80. Much of the former route in Arizona between Yuma and Gila Bend follows the marching routes used by General Stephen Watts Kearny's army as well as Lieutenant Colonel Philip St. George Cooke and the Mormon Battalion to California during the Mexican–American War. Further east on old US 80 (now AZ 80) near the New Mexico and Arizona state line stands a monument marking the place where the Apache warrior Geronimo surrendered to the United States Army in 1886. In Tombstone, the O.K. Corral, site of the infamous gunfight, is on the south side of Fremont Street, an old alignment of US 80. US 80 was the route taken by the 1965 Selma to Montgomery marches in Alabama during the American Civil Rights Movement. Prior to the successful march, the Edmund Pettus Bridge on US 80 in Selma was the site of the infamous Bloody Sunday event, where marchers were beaten and wounded by local law enforcement and armed vigilantes. In downtown Dallas, President John F. Kennedy was shot in Dealey Plaza just blocks from Commerce Street, which was part of US 80 and Business US 80.

=== California ===
Historic Route sign seen on California US 80

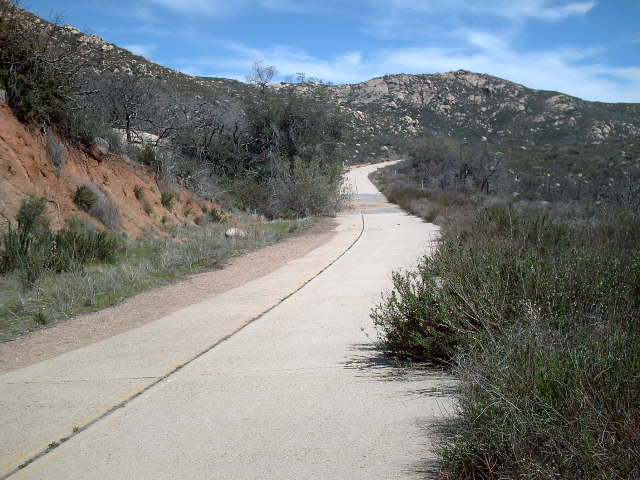
A section of old US 80 (Wildwood Glen Lane) now closed to vehicular traffic west of Descanso Junction, California

US 80 originally had its western terminus in San Diego. It was gradually decommissioned between 1964 and 1974 as I-8, through San Diego and Imperial counties, was completed.

Most former sections of US 80 in San Diego County are no longer part of the state highway system, with only small segments serving as extensions of CA 79 and CA 94. The southernmost section of the Cabrillo Freeway in San Diego is another exception, now designated as CA 163. The freeway between downtown and Washington Street served as part of US 80 from the late 1940s up until the mid-1950s.

The highway started at a junction with 12th Avenue and Market Street, which at the time was US 101 (also decommissioned in San Diego County). In later years, US 80 was extended down Market Street to Pacific Highway when US 101 was rerouted along the water around downtown. US 80 followed 12th Avenue, Park Boulevard and El Cajon Boulevard northeast out of the San Diego metro area. Most of old US 80 between El Cajon and Jacumba remains intact, often utilizing the original concrete roadway. Old US 80 often stays close to I-8. Sometimes it serves as the north or south frontage road or a parallel county road through communities such as Alpine, Willow, Guatay, Live Oak Springs and Boulevard. Often, the road through San Diego County is called Old Highway 80. In Descanso Junction, the pre-interstate route follows Wildwood Glen Lane from a dead end on the north side of I-8 to CA 79. The majority of the road was closed to traffic in 2005. Old US 80 heads south, touching the Mexican border, then passes through Jacumba before being subsumed into I-8 at Desert View Tower. Through the In-Ko-Pah Gorge, old US 80 is impassable by car and often can only be seen from the side of I-8.

Former US 80 through most of the Imperial Valley is now part County Route S80 and CA 115. From the junction with CA 115 and I-8 to Gordon's Well, US 80 acts as the north frontage road to the Interstate. It is known as Evan Hewes Highway from State Route 115 to Gordon's Well. From SR 115 to Gordon's Well it crosses the east Highline Lateral Eight, passes by the BLM Hot Springs and Holtville Hot Springs, the Brock Reservoir at Warren H. Brock Reservoir, Gordon's Well RV Park and Storage and Duner's Diner. It has junctions with a road that leads to California State Route 98, Brock Research Center Road and Gordon's Well Road. All have connections to I-8. At Grays Well, a dead end section of US 80 exists on the south side of I-8 as Grays Well Road. Today it serves as an access road for recreationists visiting the Algodones Dunes and viewing the 1916 Old Plank Road, the first highway across the dunes to Yuma and an immediate predecessor to US 80. Crumbled remains of the original asphalt US 80, built in 1926, can be seen here too. The I-8 north frontage road through the hamlet of Felicity is also a section of old US 80. It is known as Center of The World drive that runs from Ogilby road to Sidewinder road. In Winterhaven, the old route takes Araz Road past the ruins of Araz Stage Station, an old stop on the Butterfield Overland Stage Line, to I-8 Business. The Business Route into Yuma is the final alignment, while the original used part of County Route S24 and Picacho Road to take the 1914 Ocean to Ocean Bridge into Yuma. The California State Legislature declared the entirety of former US 80 in California as Historic U.S. Route 80 in 2007.

=== Arizona ===
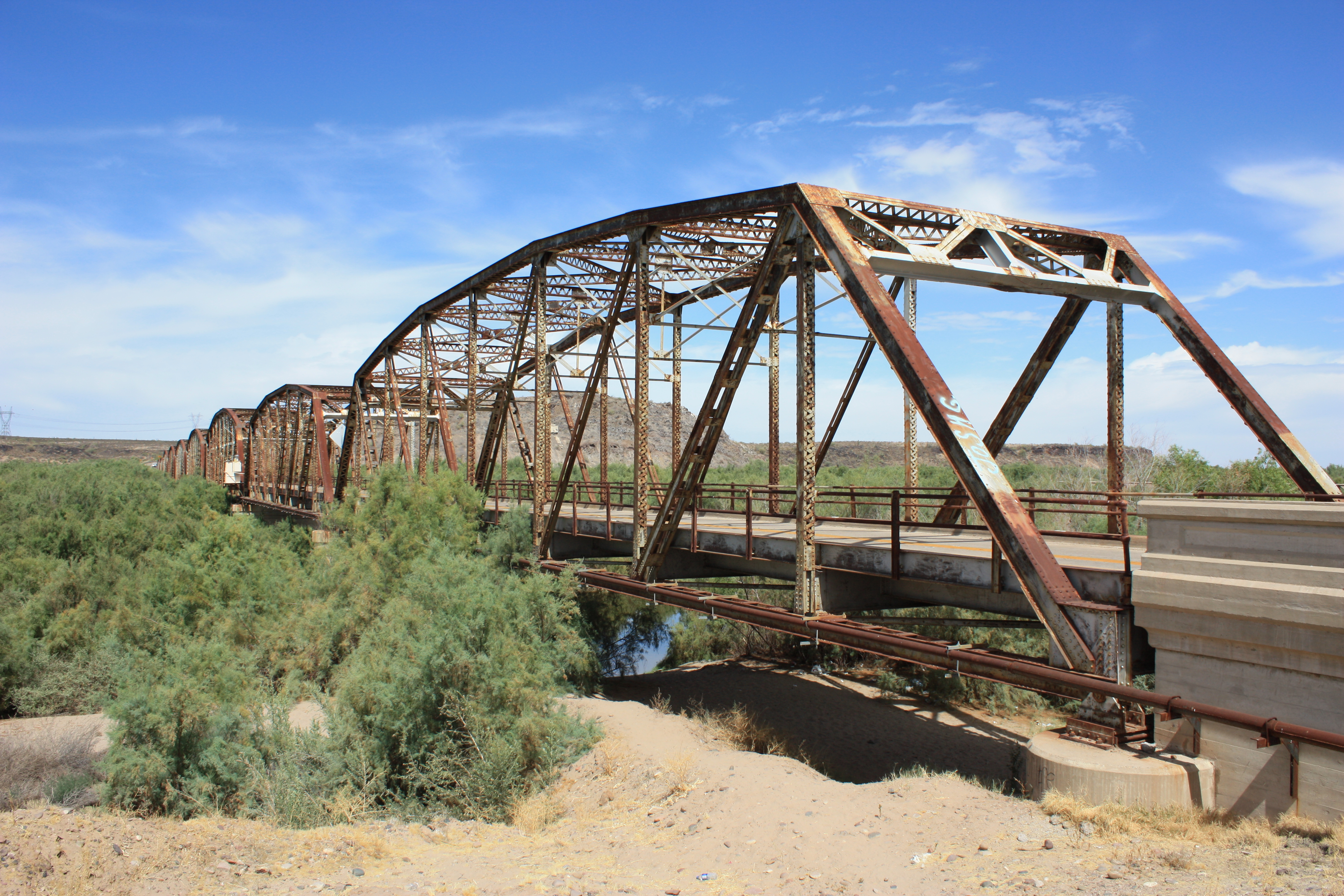
The historic Gillespie Dam Bridge over the Gila River. Built in 1927, it once carried US 80.

In Arizona, US 80 was first established in 1926 and took a route through Yuma, Phoenix, Tucson and Douglas. Between 1977 and 1989, US 80 was removed from Arizona in favor of I-10 and I-8. Much of US 80 in Arizona remains intact and completely undisturbed by I-8 and I-10, as both Interstates were constructed on more direct routes through Casa Grande and Willcox respectively, where US 80 was often a very long and indirect route through the state.

US 80 originally entered Arizona on land north of the Colorado River and crossed over into Yuma on the Ocean To Ocean Bridge, following Penitentiary Avenue and 1st Street to 4th Avenue (I-8 Business). After 1956, US 80 came into Arizona on I-8 Business to an intersection with the earlier route. US 80 then proceeded to follow I-8 Business past US 95 through Yuma. It then followed I-8 from Yuma through Telegraph Pass to Ligurta, where it split off onto Old Highway 80. US 80 headed east a few miles north of I-8 through Wellton and Tacna to Mohawk, where it rejoined I-8. The route split off again south of I-8 through Dateland and followed the south frontage road to Aztec, rejoining I-8 again.

In Theba, US 80 split off again as the south frontage road east to I-8 Business through Gila Bend to AZ 85. AZ 85, between Gila Bend and Buckeye, is the only section of former US 80 west of Dallas not bypassed by an Interstate. Though AZ 85 is itself a bypass of the original route through Arlington and Cotton Center. Today the older route is known as Old US 80 Highway. In Buckeye, US 80 took MC 85/Buckeye Road east through Goodyear and Avondale into Phoenix.

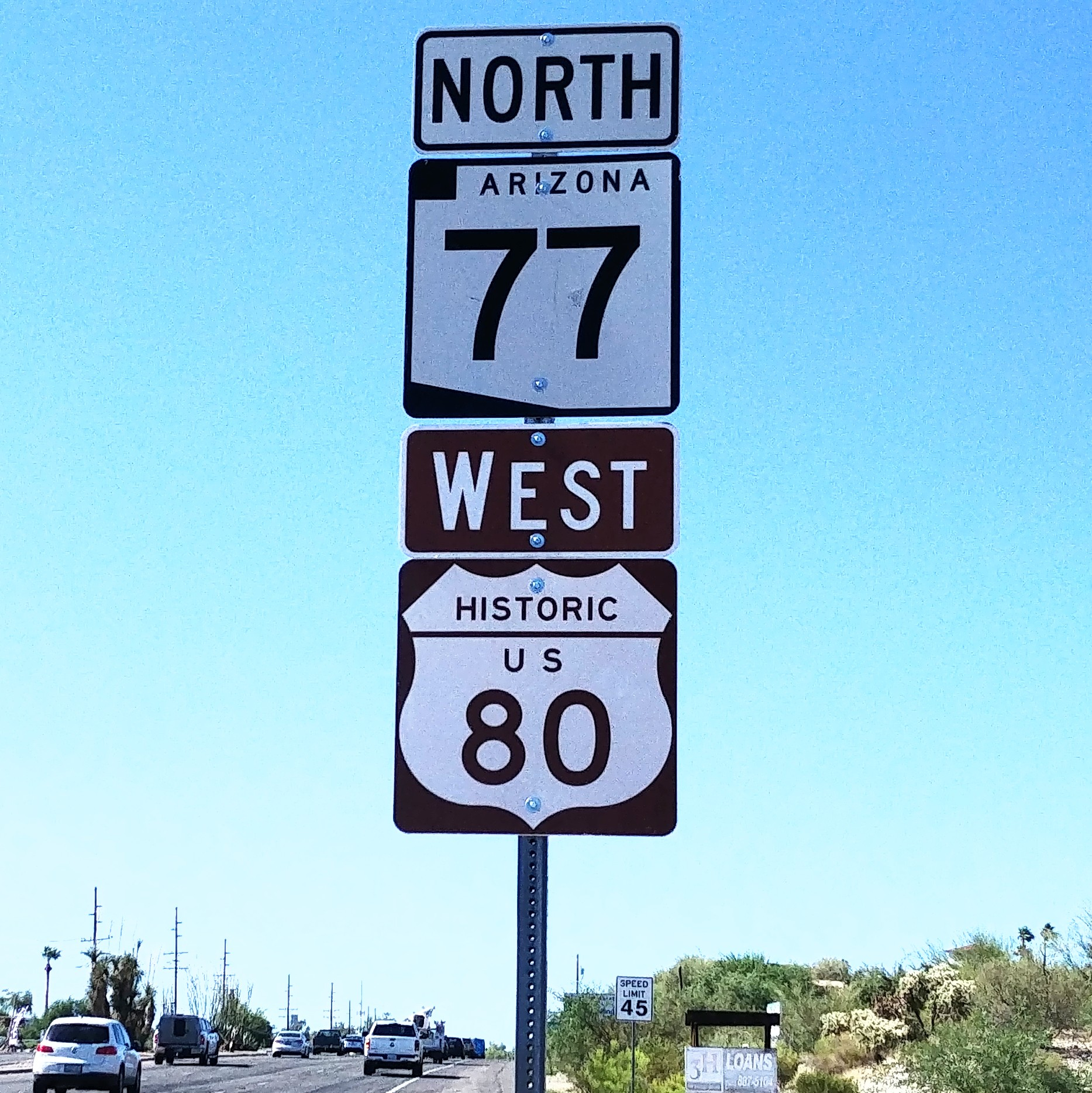
AZ 77 and Historic US 80 running concurrent through Tucson.

From Buckeye Road, US 80 travelled north on 17th Avenue, then east on Van Buren Street through the Phoenix metro area. Van Buren changes its name several times to Mill Avenue in Tempe, Main Street in Mesa and Apache Trail/Old West Highway through Apache Junction, before US 80 joined the route of US 60 to Florence Junction. Today, US 80 from Florence Junction through Florence to Tucson consists of AZ 79, AZ 79 Business and AZ 77 south of Oracle Junction. In Tucson, US 80 continued south on Oracle Road past West Miracle Mile. The highway used Drachman Street, Stone Avenue, 6th Avenue and Benson Highway to I-10 east of town.

For the most part, US 80 followed I-10 east to Benson. Near Vail, an older section of US 80 still exists as the north frontage road and Marsh Station Road. In Benson, US 80 took I-10 Business to AZ 80, where it headed southeast to Tombstone. AZ 80 takes its number from the former U.S. Highway and makes up the majority of the former route through Cochise County through Tombstone, Bisbee and Douglas to NM 80 at the New Mexico state line. The earlier routing in Bisbee took Old Divide Road and Main Street through town, while the older Douglas route used G Avenue, 10th Street and A Avenue.

US 80 had a major impact on developing Arizona's car culture and at times, would compete with US 66 In overall popularity. At one point in the mid-1950s, more people entered California through Arizona on US 80 than on US 66. In Tucson there are over 281 extant historic motels and structures along the original US 80 alignment, especially on the Miracle Mile and Benson Highway segments. Part of former US 80 through Tucson was added to the National Register of Historic Places in December 2017 as the Miracle Mile Historic District. On September 21, 2018, the Arizona Transportation Board designated the old alignment of US 80 as a state Historic Road connecting with the designation in California. The alignment was nominated by the Tucson Historic Preservation Foundation.

=== New Mexico ===
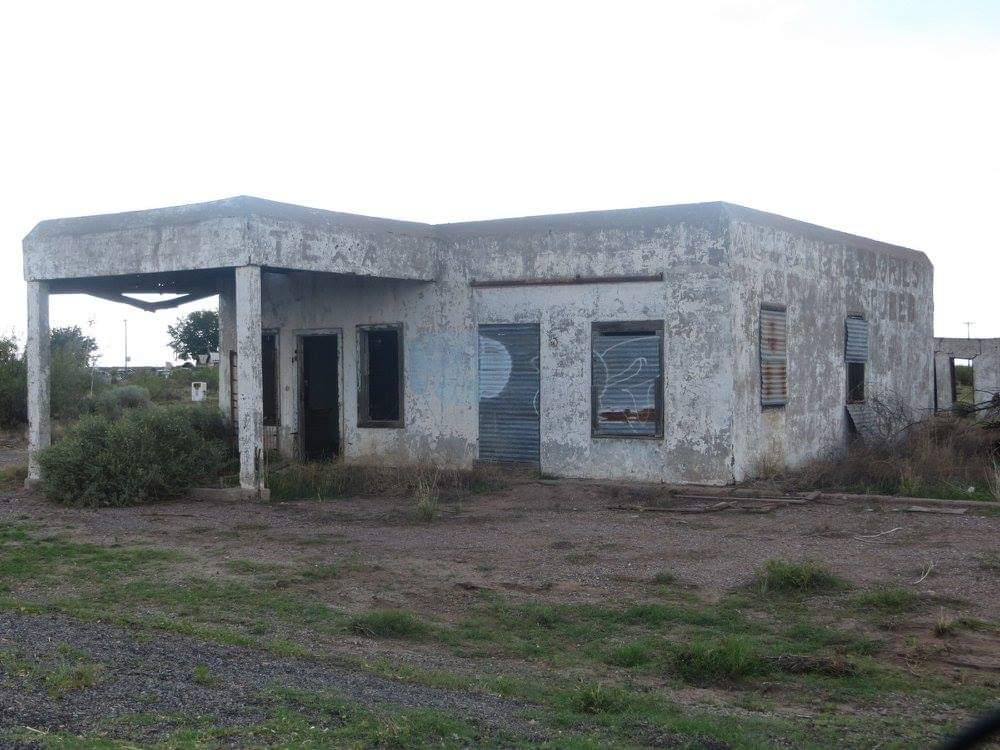
An old Texaco station, now abandoned on the side of NM 418 (former US 70 and US 80)

Through New Mexico, US 80 travelled through Lordsburg, New Mexico, Deming and Las Cruces. Between 1989 and 1991, US 80 was removed from New Mexico since it was supplanted almost entirely by I-10.

US 80 entered New Mexico on present day NM 80 passing through Rodeo before heading north to join the route of I-10 at Road Forks. Between Road Forks and the Texas border, US 80 was often the subject of major realignment.

The later routings generally follow what is now I-10, US 70, US 180 and I-10 Business through Lordsburg and Deming, between Road Forks and Las Cruces. From Las Cruces, US 80 used Valley Drive, the I-10 west frontage road and NM 460 to reach SH 20 in Texas.

The older routings utilized a now abandoned roadway between the Union Pacific Railroad and I-10 from Road Forks to Deming. Older US 80 followed present day I-10 Business and US 70 through Lordsburg. The older route through Deming followed NM 418 into Deming, then east on Spruce Street, I-10 Business/US 180 and NM 549 through Cambray back to I-10. Where NM 549 takes on the form of the south frontage road, US 80 followed a now abandoned railbed northwest of Cambray for a short distance before rejoining the route of NM 549. Older US 80 then followed US 70 and NM 478 through Las Cruces to NM 460 and SH 20 at the Texas border.

=== Texas ===
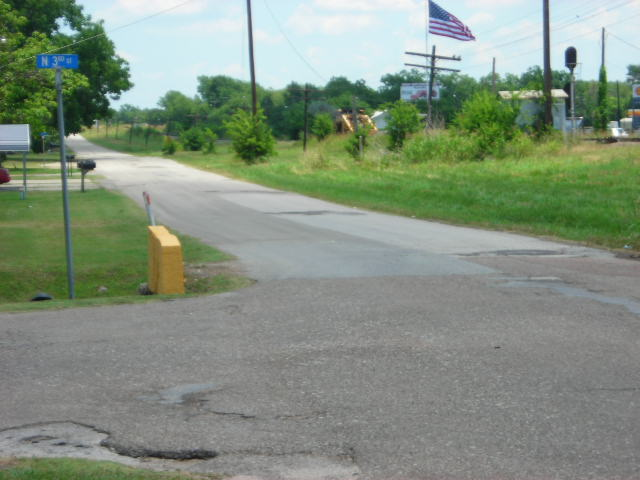
Old US 80 in Wills Point, Texas

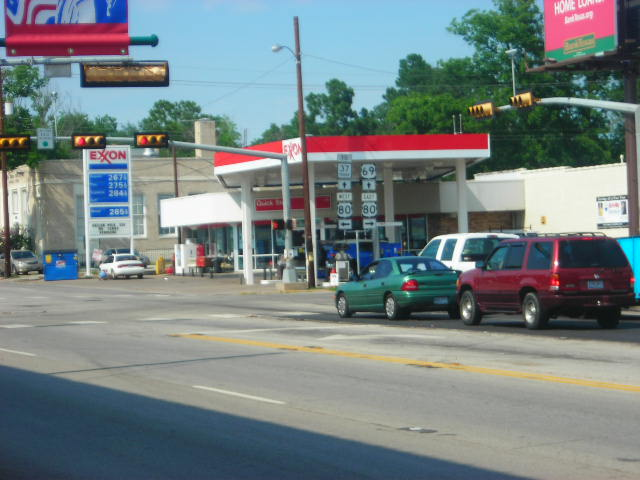
The junction of US highways 69 and 80 in Mineola, Texas

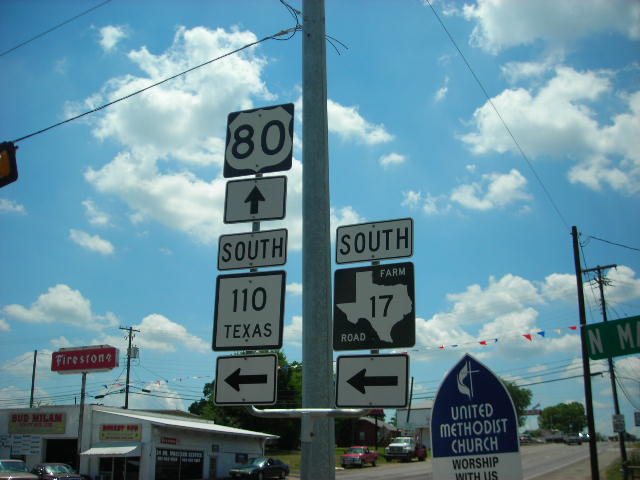
US 80 in Grand Saline, Texas

From the New Mexico border, US 80 (concurrent with US 85) formerly passed through the Mesilla Valley communities of Anthony, Vinton, and Canutillo. State Highway 20 (SH 20) follows the original US 80/US 85 route. I-10 bypassed the original US 80 routing in western El Paso County, and now parallels the old US 80 route a few miles east until crossing it at the current junction with SH 20, where I-10 continues through El Paso, then heads off southeast towards San Antonio. SH 20 follows the old alignment of US 80 until downtown El Paso. Exiting El Paso, I-10 mostly follows the former routing of US 80, but bypassing smaller towns in the Trans-Pecos that were formerly on US 80 (such as Van Horn). I-10 then has a junction with I-20 outside of Kent. I-20 then follows former US 80 all the way to Fort Worth, bypassing many old sections of US 80 on the way. They are as follows:

- SH 20 from New Mexico via El Paso to I-10 near McNary, bypassed 1969
- Business Interstate 10-C (Bus. I-10-C) through Sierra Blanca (originally Loop 416 and Business U.S. Highway 80, Bus. US 80), bypassed 1965
- Bus. I-10-D through Van Horn (originally Loop 51 and Bus. US 80), bypassed 1975
- Bus. I-20-B through Pecos and Barstow, part of US 80 until its 1991 truncation
- Spur 57 through Pyote and Wickett, part of US 80 until its 1991 truncation
- Bus. I-20-D through Monahans, part of US 80 until its 1991 truncation
- Bus. I-20-E through Odessa and Midland, part of US 80 until its 1991 truncation
  - Spur 268 and SH 158 through downtown Midland (originally Bus. US 80), bypassed in 1953
- Business Interstate 20-F through Stanton (originally Loop 214), part of US 80 until its 1991 truncation
- Bus. I-20-G through Big Spring (originally Loop 402 and Bus. US 80), bypassed 1965
- Bus. I-20-H through Westbrook (originally Loop 333), bypassed 1958
- Bus. I-20-J through Colorado City (originally Loop 377 and Bus. US 80), bypassed 1963
- Bus. I-20-K through Loraine (originally Loop 316), bypassed 1957
- Bus. I-20-L through Roscoe (originally Loop 237), bypassed 1959
- Loop 170 past Sweetwater Municipal Airport, bypassed 1946
- Bus. I-20-M through Sweetwater (originally Loop 432 and Bus. US 80), bypassed 1966
- Bus. I-20-N through Trent (originally Loop 319), bypassed 1957
- Bus. I-20-P through Merkel (originally Loop 39), bypassed 1959
- Bus. I-20-Q through Tye (originally Loop 320), bypassed 1957
- Bus. I-20-R through Abilene (originally Loop 355 and Bus. US 80), bypassed 1961
- Farm to Market Road 18 (FM 18) east of Abilene, bypassed 1951
- Bus. I-20-T through Baird (originally Loop 425), bypassed 1966
- FM 2945 west of Cisco, bypassed 1964
- SH 206, SH 6 and SH 112 through Cisco and Eastland, part of US 80 until its 1991 truncation
- Farm to Market Road 3363 (FM 3363) through Olden, bypassed 1976
- Loop 254 through Ranger, part of US 80 until its 1991 truncation
- Spur 312 and US 180 through Weatherford, part of US 80 until its 1991 truncation

In Fort Worth, I-20 breaks off the old US 80 route at I-30's junction with I-20, which is also I-30's western terminus. Just east of the junction, I-30 leaves the pre-1991 route of US 80, now Spur 580. Old US 80 travels due east on Spur 580 to US 377 (Camp Bowie Boulevard), where it heads northeast to the junction with I-30. At I-30, US 377 and former US 80 join the freeway into downtown Fort Worth; the old route—along Camp Bowie Boulevard and Lancaster Avenue—was once Bus. US 80.

The old route along Camp Bowie Boulevard in Fort Worth turned onto Lancaster Avenue to follow it to SH 180 under the Interstate 35W and Interstate 30 freeways, where the highway begins and follows SH 180 on Lancaster Avenue in Fort Worth, Division Street in Arlington, Main Street in Grand Prairie and Davis Street in Dallas.

Just east of downtown Fort Worth, US 80 split from I-30 onto present SH 180 until 1991. Approaching downtown Dallas, the older route of US 80 used Fort Worth Avenue and Commerce Street, designated Loop 260 and Bus. US 80 in 1952. (US 80 had bypassed that route by 1939, but it was SH 1 until 1952.) The later US 80 continued east on Davis Street, turning north at Zang Boulevard (Loop 354 until 1991), shifting to a route via SH 180 to I-35E after 1961. Through and east of downtown, the route before it was rerouted onto present I-30 used Commerce Street, Parry Avenue, Haskell Avenue, Grand Avenue and Samuell Boulevard. (This was not assigned a number or a business route designation when it was bypassed.) In eastern Dallas, the old route merges with the present freeway at Town East Boulevard, shortly after present US 80 begins at the split from I-30. US 80 eastbound, that ran from Fort Worth Avenue to Zang Boulevard near Oak Cliff along SH 180 in Dallas, made a left turn onto Zang Boulevard to follow it onto the Jefferson Viaduct and Market Street to make a right onto Commerce Street. Westbound US 80 turned off of Elm Street to go onto Houston Street to follow it, the Houston Street Viaduct and Zang Boulevard all the way to Davis Street (SH 180), where it turned right to follow it from there to Camp Bowie Boulevard in Fort Worth. In downtown Dallas, US 80 followed Commerce Street eastbound and Elm Street westbound. On Commerce Street in Dallas, US 80 goes onto Second Avenue to follow it to Main Street where it makes a left turn onto Main Street and a left onto First Avenue to head onto Robert B Cullum Boulevard to merge onto eastbound I-30/US 67 to follow that all the way to present US 80. Westbound US 80 breaks away from westbound I-30/US 67 to head onto First Avenue to make a left on Exposition Avenue to head onto Elm Street where it goes left to follow it into downtown Dallas.

FM 688 is the old alignment through Forney, bypassed in 1959 by the present freeway. Most of this route was a spur of FM 740 until 1960.

=== Louisiana ===
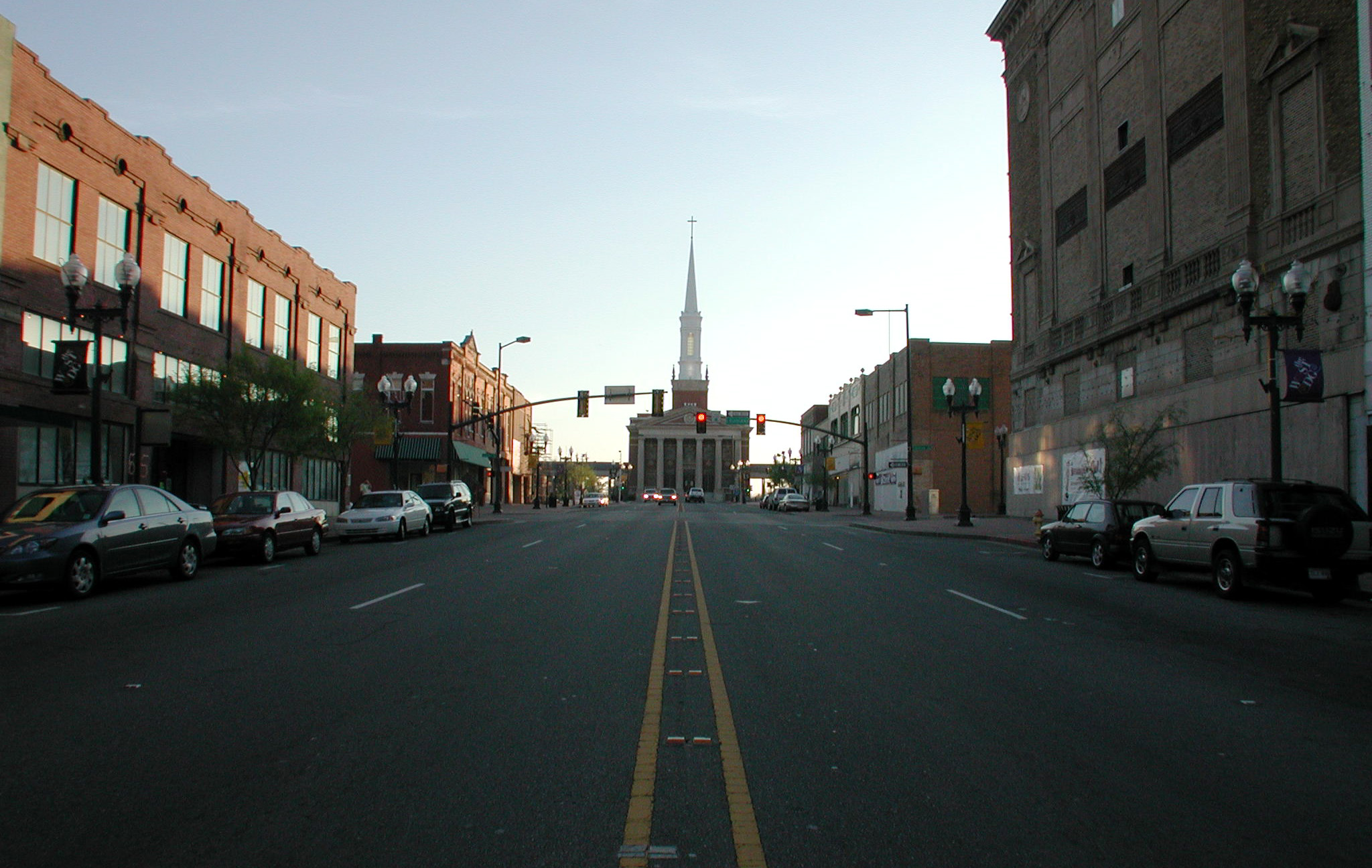
View down Texas Street, a section of US 80 in downtown Shreveport

US 80 was routed along the existing Dixie Overland Highway throughout Louisiana. Since 1921, this auto trail had also carried the designations of State Route 1 west of Shreveport and State Route 4 from Shreveport eastward. These routes remained co-signed with US 80 until the 1955 Louisiana Highway renumbering. The few significant changes to the alignment of US 80 over the years have resulted from the addition or replacement of bridges along the route, improvements that were largely carried out during the 1930s and the mid-1950s. The biggest project involved the construction of the first Vicksburg Bridge across the Mississippi River in 1930. This was followed by new bridges across the Red River at Shreveport–Bossier City (Long–Allen Bridge, 1933) and the Ouachita River in Monroe (P.M. Atkins Bridge, 1936). In both cases, new alignments carried traffic eastward from the bridges, bypassing the original routes through Bossier City and downtown Monroe. Minor relocation of the highway has also resulted from overpasses replacing several at-grade railroad crossings, as US 80 parallels what is now the Kansas City Southern Railway throughout the state.

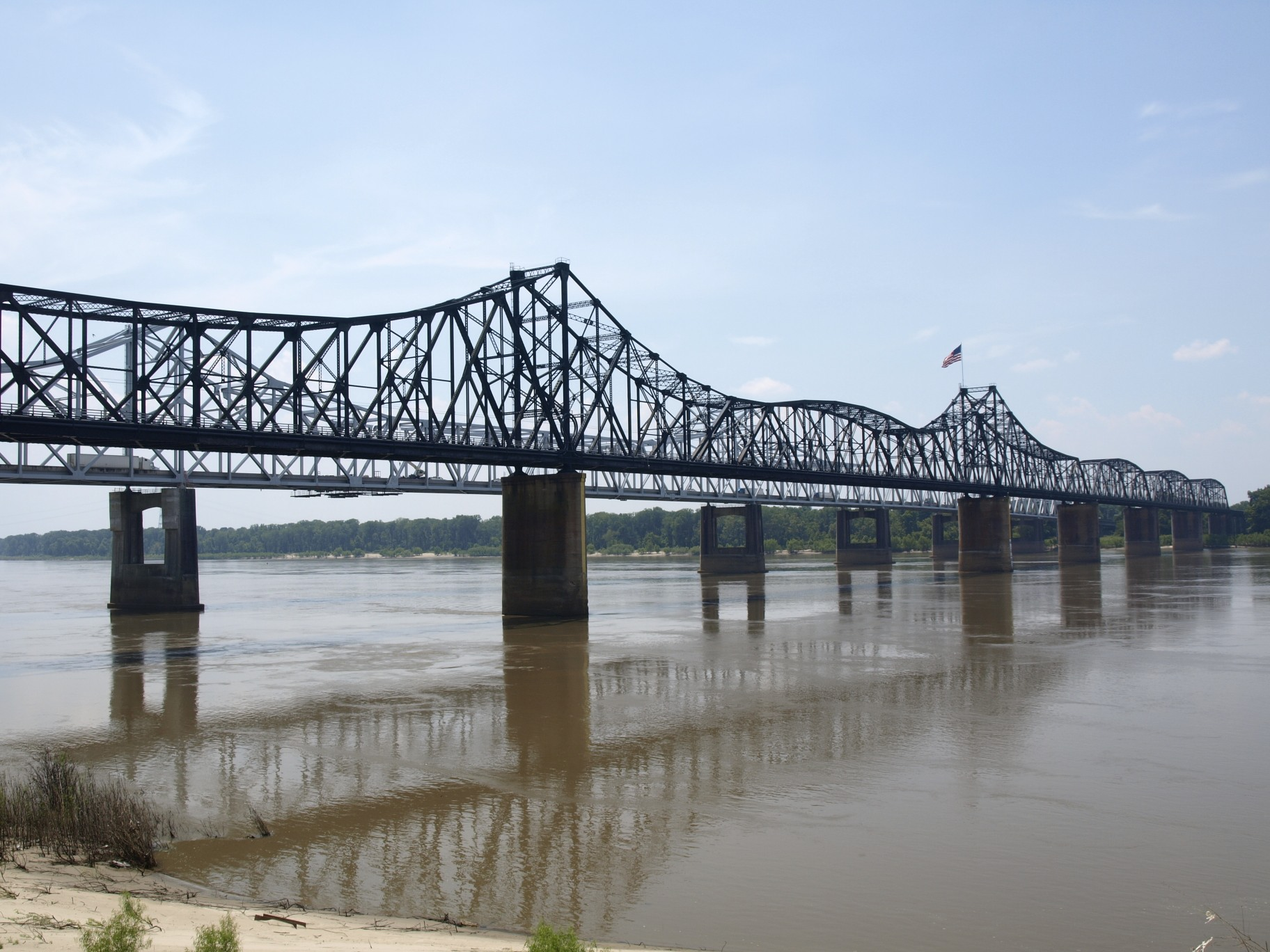
Old Vicksburg Bridge across the Mississippi River

The opening of I-20 parallel to US 80 occurred in stages between 1960 and 1977. This gradually transformed US 80 from being the major highway across northern Louisiana to serving local traffic along the I-20 corridor. However, the highway has remained physically independent from I-20 with one exception. In 1980, the closing of the old Vicksburg Bridge to vehicular traffic resulted in US 80 being shifted onto the newer I-20 Vicksburg Bridge to cross the Mississippi River.

=== Alabama ===
What is now US 80 in Alabama was previously designated as Alabama State Road 26 (SR 26) between 1924 and 1928. During the 1928 Alabama State Route renumbering, pre-1928 SR 26 was replaced by Alabama State Route 8 (SR 8). Today, SR 8 is still the internal designation for US 80 throughout the state, except for the section bypassing Selma (which is part of SR 14 and SR 41) and the westernmost section in the western part of the state, concurrent with US 11 (designated as SR 7). The segments of SR 8 not part of US 80 are an unsigned spur between SR 8's western terminus at I-20 and the US 80 Business route through Selma. The current routing of US 80 between Cuba and Livingston was originally designated as SR 162. US 80 generally followed the route of present-day SR 28 and US 11 between Cuba and Livingston. In 1955, US 80 was moved onto this newer highway, which was more direct and bypassed Coatopa, Livingston and York. The transition of US 80 and SR 8 to the new highway effectively retired the SR 162 designation. Despite the Dixie Overland Highway no longer being an active highway, the state of Alabama still legally recognizes the entire length of US 80 through the state under this name.

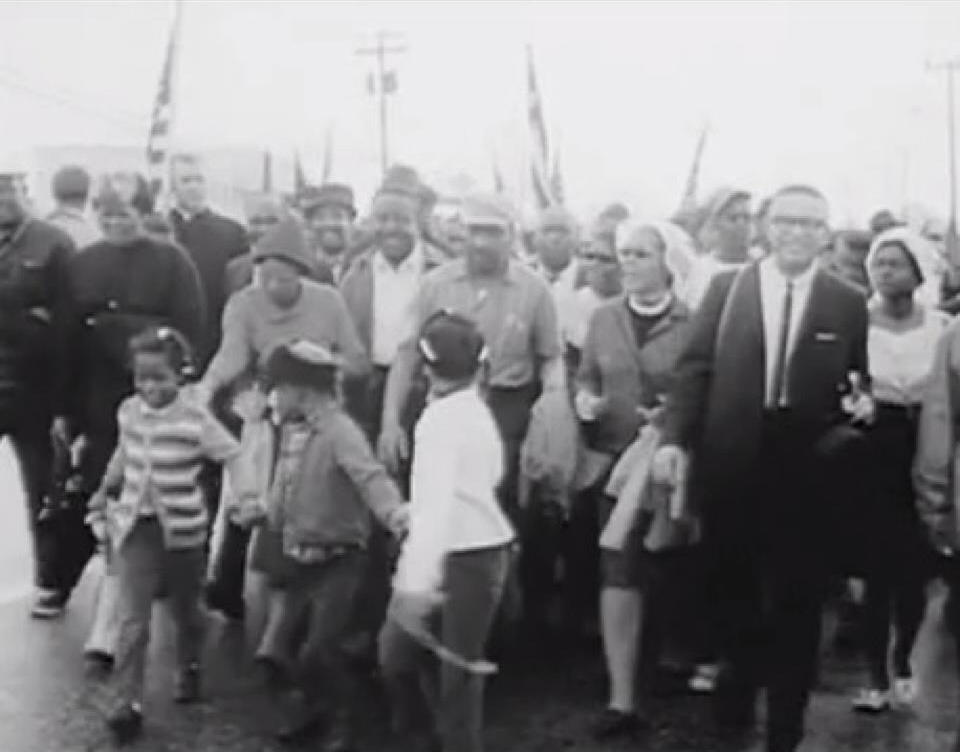
Demonstrators walking down US 80 in Montgomery on the last day of the Selma to Montgomery marches on March 25, 1965.

In 1965, the Edmund Pettus Bridge in Selma, then part of US 80, was the site of the infamous Bloody Sunday event. The Alabama National Guard, Selma and Dallas County law enforcement as well as armed non-law enforcement individuals brutally beat and trampled Civil Rights protesters with police batons, horses and barbed wire bats, bringing a pre-mature end to an attempted march to Montgomery. The brutality was captured on national television, sparking nationwide outrage regarding the abuse suffered by the protesters. Following Bloody Sunday, the 1965 Selma to Montgomery marches followed US 80 between the two cities. In 1996, this route was designated by the National Park Service as the Selma to Montgomery National Voting Rights Trail. An interpretive center is located along the route in Lowndes County and the various sites used as campgrounds are marked along the route. Today, the old section of US 80 through Selma, including the Edmund Pettus Bridge, is signed as US 80 Business.

== Major intersections ==
Texas
I-30 / US 67 on the Dallas–Mesquite city line
I-635 in Mesquite
US 69 in Mineola
US 271 in Gladewater
US 259 in Longview
Future I-369 / US 59 in Marshall
I-20 west-southwest of Jonesville. The highways travel concurrently to west of Waskom.
Louisiana
US 79 in Greenwood. The highways travel concurrently to Minden.
I-20 in Greenwood
US 171 in Shreveport
I-20 in Shreveport
US 71 in Shreveport
I-220 in Bossier City
US 371 in Dixie Inn
I-20 southeast of Minden
US 167 in Ruston. The highways travel concurrently through Ruston.
I-20 east of Calhoun
US 165 in Monroe
US 425 in Rayville
US 65 in Tallulah
I-20 in Delta. The highways travel concurrently to Clinton, Mississippi.
Mississippi
US 61 in Vicksburg. The highways travel concurrently through Vicksburg.
I-220 in Jackson
US 51 in Jackson
I-20 in Brandon
I-20 in Brandon
I-20 east-southeast of Lake
I-20 west-southwest of Meridian. The highways travel concurrently to Meridian.
I-59 in Meridian. The highways travel concurrently to Meridian.
US 11 in Meridian. The highways travel concurrently to Cuba.
I-20 / I-59 west of Kewanee
Alabama
US 43 in Demopolis. The highways travel concurrently through Demopolis.
US 31 in Montgomery
I-65 in Montgomery. The highways travel concurrently through Montgomery.
I-65 / US 82 in Montgomery. US 80/US 82 travels concurrently through Montgomery.
US 331 in Montgomery
US 82 / US 231 in Montgomery. US 80/US 231 travels concurrently through Montgomery.
I-85 / Future I-685 / US 231 in Montgomery. I-685/US 80 will travel concurrently to east-northeast of Mount Meigs. I-85/US 80 travels concurrently to northwest of Waugh.
US 29 in Tuskegee. The highways travel concurrently to Tuskegee National Forest.
US 280 / US 431 in Phenix City. The highways travel concurrently through Phenix City.
Georgia
I-185 in Columbus
US 27 in Columbus
US 19 south-southwest of Salem. The highways travel concurrently for approximately 2.1 miles (3.4 km).
US 341 in Roberta
I-475 in Macon
US 41 in Macon
I-75 in Macon
US 129 in Macon. The highways travel concurrently through Macon.
I-16 in Macon
US 23 in Macon. The highways travel concurrently to west of Crystal Springs.
US 441 in Dublin
US 319 in Dublin. The highways travel concurrently to East Dublin.
US 221 north-northeast of Norristown
US 1 in Swainsboro
US 25 in Hopeulikit. The highways travel concurrently to Statesboro.
US 25 / US 301 in Statesboro
US 280 in Blitchton
I-95 in Pooler
I-516 in Garden City. The highways travel concurrently to Savannah.
I-516 / US 17 in Savannah. The highways travel concurrently through Savannah.
Butler Avenue/Inlet Avenue/Tybrisa Street in Tybee Island

== See also ==
- Bankhead Highway
- Special routes of U.S. Route 80

=== Related routes ===
- U.S. Route 180
- U.S. Route 280
- U.S. Route 380

Browse numbered routes
← US 79	LA	→ LA 81
← US 78	MS	→ US 82
