= KPSA-FM =

- Lordsburg, New Mexico; United States
- Frequency: 98.5 MHz
- Branding: 98.5 The Planet

Programming
- Format: Classic rock

Ownership
- Owner: Cochise Media Licenses, LLC

History
- First air date: 1986 (as KXKK at 97.7)
- Former call signs: KXKK (1984–1997); KQTN (1997–2002)
- Former frequencies: 97.7 MHz (1989–2022)

Technical information
- Licensing authority: FCC
- Facility ID: 29027
- Class: A
- ERP: 250 watts
- HAAT: −41 meters (−135 ft)
- Transmitter coordinates: 32°20′56.5″N 108°42′22″W

Links
- Public license information: Public file; LMS

KPSA-FM (98.5 FM, "98.5 The Planet") is a radio station licensed to serve Lordsburg, New Mexico, United States. The station, established in 1986, is currently owned by Cochise Media Licenses, LLC. The station is a member of the New Mexico Broadcasters Association.

== Programming ==
KPSA-FM broadcasts a classic rock music format. In addition to its usual music programming, KPSA-FM broadcasts Major League Baseball games as a member of the Arizona Diamondbacks radio network.

== History ==
=== Launch ===
This station received its original construction permit from the Federal Communications Commission on May 22, 1984. The new station was assigned the KXKK call sign by the FCC on August 6, 1984.

In October 1986, permit holders Charles R. Crisler and John W. Krehbiel, doing business as Interstate 10 Broadcasting of New Mexico, applied to the FCC to transfer the permit for the still-under construction KXKK to a new corporation called Interstate 10 Broadcasting of New Mexico, Inc. The transfer was approved by the FCC on June 30, 1987, and the transaction was consummated on August 18, 1987. After several extensions and engineering modifications, KXKK finally received its license to cover from the FCC on September 22, 1989, broadcasting on 97.7 MHz.

=== KQTN ===
In July 1994, after an aborted attempt to sell the station the previous year, Interstate 10 Broadcasting of New Mexico, Inc., reached an agreement to sell this station to Loretta L. Farrier. The deal was approved by the FCC on June 14, 1995, and the transaction was consummated on August 14, 1995. The new owner had the FCC change the station's call sign to KQTN on January 31, 1997.

In May 1998, Loretta L. Farrier, announced a deal to sell KQTN to LuRunn Broadcasting System, LLC. The deal was approved by the FCC on September 1, 1998, and the transaction was consummated on October 20, 1998. In October 1999, LuRunn Broadcasting System owner Phillip H. Runnels applied to transfer control of this station to Dewey Matthew Runnels as part of a multi-station deal valued at $180,000. The transfer was approved by the FCC on December 20, 1999, and the transaction was consummated on January 20, 2000. At the time of the transfer, KQTN's signal was dark. Shortly thereafter, the company changed its name to Runnels Broadcasting System, LLC.

=== KPSA-FM ===
Facing financial difficulties, the broadcast license for KQTN was involuntarily transferred in August 2002 from Runnels Broadcasting System, LLC, to Runnels Broadcasting System, LLC, as Debtor-In-Possession. The transfer was approved by the FCC and consummated on September 19, 2002. The station was assigned new call sign KPSA-FM by the FCC on October 22, 2002.

As the financial issues continued, the license was again involuntarily transferred, this time from Runnels Broadcasting System, LLC, as Debtor-In-Possession to Linda S. Bloom acting as bankruptcy trustee for Runnels Broadcasting System, LLC. The transfer was approved by the FCC on January 7, 2005, and the transaction was consummated on January 10, 2005. In February 2006, with approval from the bankruptcy court, trustee Linda S. Bloom reached an agreement to sell KPSA-FM to SkyWest Media subsidiary SkyWest Licenses New Mexico, LLC, as part of a three-station deal valued at $565,000. The deal was approved by the FCC on March 28, 2006, and the transaction was consummated on June 1, 2006.

=== Sale ===
In July 2009, SkyWest Media, through its Skywest Licenses New Mexico, LLC, subsidiary, reached an agreement to sell this station to Cochise Media Licenses, LLC, as part of a three-station deal in exchange for $552,000 in debt forgiveness. SkyWest Media is owned by Ted Tucker Jr. and Cochise Media Licenses is owned by his father, Ted Tucker Sr. This application was accepted for filing on July 13, 2009, and granted on October 9, 2009.

Previous logo

== Construction permit ==
KPSA-FM applied to the FCC in July, 2010 for a construction permit that would allow them to change broadcast frequencies to 97.9 MHz, dramatically increase its effective radiated power from 250 to 43,000 watts, raise its antenna to 622 meters (2,041 ft) in height above average terrain, and relocate its transmitter site northeast to 32°34'57"N, 108°25'29"W. The improvements will increase the coverage area of the KPSA-FM broadcast signal. The FCC granted the permit on August 26, 2010, and the permit is scheduled to expire on August 26, 2013.

Effective July 26, 2022, KPSA-FM was licensed to operate on 98.5 MHz.
