= Road Forks, New Mexico =

Unincorporated community in New Mexico, United States

- Unincorporated community
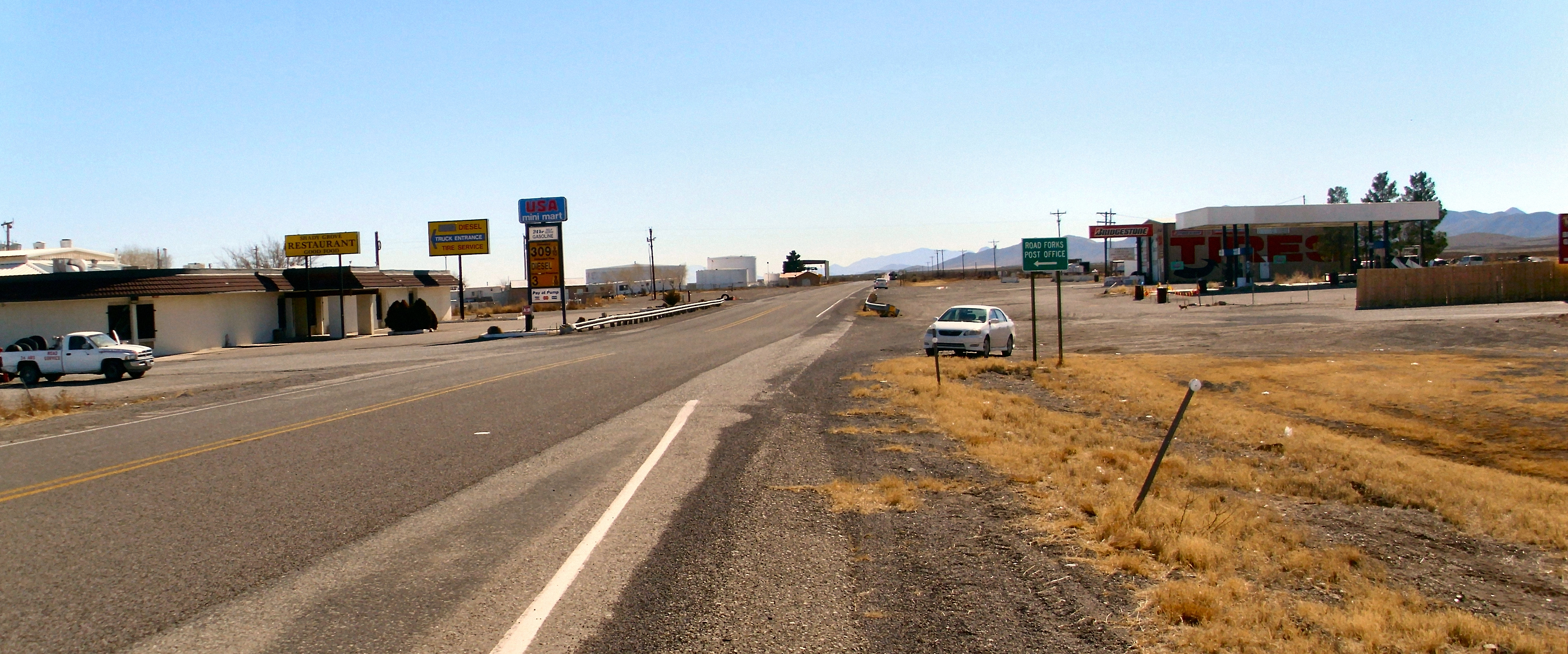
- Looking south from Interstate 10

- Location within New Mexico Location within the United States
- Coordinates: 32°14′23″N 108°57′10″W
- Country: United States
- State: New Mexico
- County: Hidalgo
- Established: 1925
- Elevation: 4,193 ft (1,278 m)
- Time zone: UTC-7 (Mountain (MST))
  - Summer (DST): UTC-6 (MDT)
- ZIP codes: 88045
- Area code: 575
- GNIS feature ID: 893996

Road Forks is an unincorporated community in western Hidalgo County, New Mexico, United States, in the southwestern corner of the state. It is 6.2 miles (10 km) east of the Arizona border, due east of Stern's Mountain, and at the junction of Interstate 10 and New Mexico State Road 80 (Historic U.S. Route 80). It is 15 miles (24 km) southwest of the city of Lordsburg and 3 miles (4.8 km) east of Steins. Road Forks had a post office from shortly after its founding in 1925 until 1955, when postal services were transferred to Lordsburg.

== History ==
Road Forks was founded in 1925 by Mr. and Mrs. G. H. Porter, who gave it its name.
