= The Simmons & Wright Company =

- The Simmons-Wright Company
- U.S. National Register of Historic Places
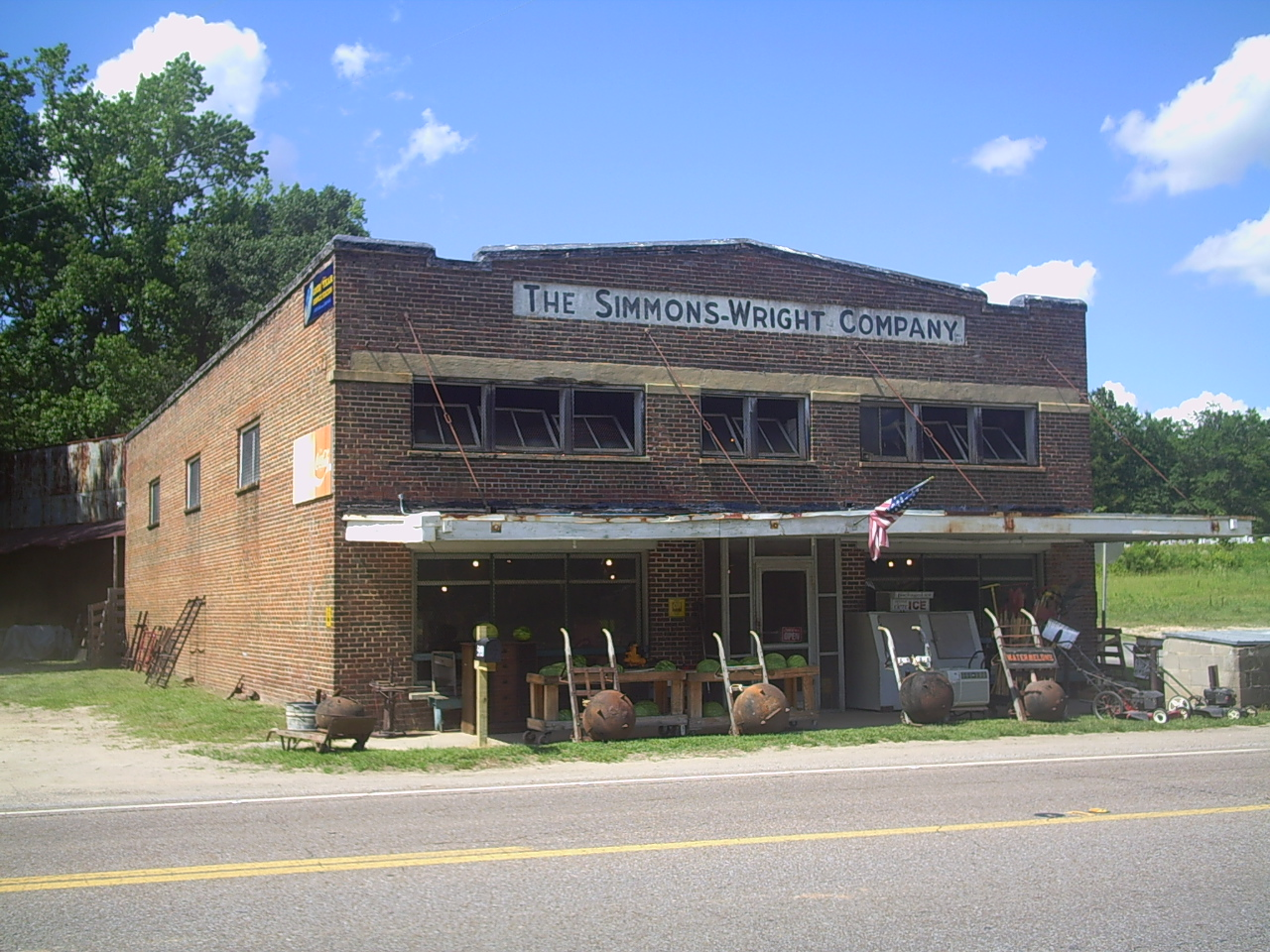
- Simmons - Wright Company in 2010

- Location within Mississippi Location within the United States
- Location: Kewanee, Mississippi
- Nearest city: Meridian, Mississippi
- Coordinates: 32°25′28″N 88°26′20″W
- Area: 2.4 acres (0.97 ha)
- NRHP reference No.: 08000198
- Added to NRHP: March 13, 2008

The Simmons - Wright Company is a historic general store established in 1884 in Kewanee, Mississippi, a small town just outside Meridian in Lauderdale County. The building was listed on the National Register of Historic Places in 2008.

== History ==
The store was originally built in 1884 by William Simmons and Tom Wright before what is now known as US Highway 11/80 was built. What is now the back of the store then faced the Old Dixie Highway, which ran west through Meridian and east all the way to Key West, Florida. The site was most likely chosen because of its close proximity to the railroad, so trains could stop and unload cargo for local farmers.

Though the store still operates today, the period in which business thrived began with its establishment in 1884 and lasted until the 1960s. The company relied heavily on the cotton industry and the many farmers that needed supplies in the area. In the 1880s, the store included a blacksmith shop, a gristmill for grinding corn and wheat, a cotton gin, and a sawmill and carried everyday items such as groceries, clothing, and other necessities. During the Great Depression, customers who built up a tab at the store were allowed to pay it off with cotton. The owner would purchase cotton from them. If the cotton was insufficient to pay the customer's tab in its entirety, the owner would allow the tab to roll over to the next year.

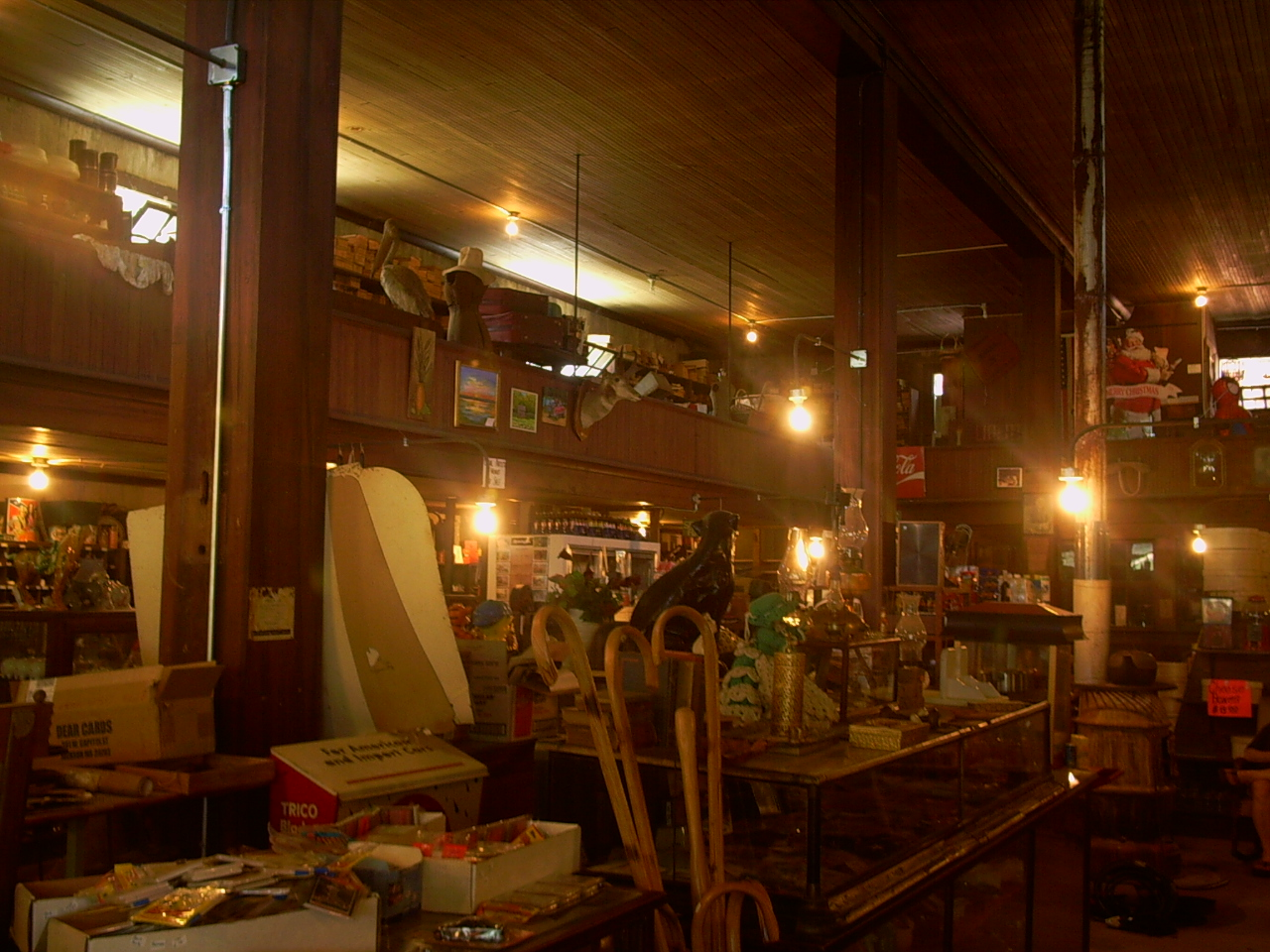
Inside view of the store

A fire destroyed the original store building in 1926, but it was rebuilt in the same year using brick instead of wood, of which the original store was built. The current building is two stories tall with a porch on the front (south) facade. A wood awning covers the porch and is suspended by cables which attach to the front of the building. The roof is flat, bordered by a parapet wall, which is capped with a concrete belt that peaks in the center. The interior contains many wood shelves and glass showcases in which merchandise is displayed and stored. The second floor contains a wrap-around balcony, which is accessed via a staircase in the rear of the building. The entire store is open except for an office room in the back of the first floor and a closet on the second floor. There is a wood-burning stove on the first floor for heating during the winter, and though there is no air conditioning in the building, there are fans throughout the building for use during the summer heat.

Behind the store, there is a warehouse built-in 1926. It is built on brick pilings and constructed of wood and aluminum. There is a brick enclosure on the south side of the building that was used to store ice for the store. Also on the site are a cotton gin, blacksmith shop, and multiple seed storage buildings made mostly of wood and tin. These buildings were mainly used in the production of cotton. There are also older, deteriorated buildings on the site, including an older cotton gin, a shed, a gristmill, and a sawmill.

== The company today ==
In the early 1950s, C.H. Ryan bought 52% ownership of the store; the remainder was passed down to Rowena, Bo, and Jean Simmons through the will of William Simmons, one of the original owners of the company. Bernice Simmons owned the company from the mid-1970s until her death in 1998. Since then, the store has been owned by Gary and Janice Pickett. Gasoline fueling tanks were added to the front of the store at some point but removed in the 1980s.

Today, the store still operates and sells antiques, hardware, seed and feed for animals, and small farming equipment. The store also continues to sell groceries such as those that might be found in a convenience store as well as the store's famed hoop cheese.

In 2009, film makers working on the Robert Downey, Jr. movie, Due Date, shot video of the Simmons - Wright store that may be used in the film.
