= Dixie Overland Highway =

Auto trail in the United States

Dixie Overland Highway

Route information
- Existed: 1914–present

Major junctions
- West end: San Diego, CA
- East end: Savannah, GA

Location
- Country: United States

Highway system
- Auto trails

The Dixie Overland Highway was an auto trail across the southern United States. It was conceived in July 1914 by the Automobile Club of Savannah, which envisioned a practical all-year driving route from Georgia to California. It was originally developed as a cross-country route, from the Pacific Ocean to the Atlantic Ocean making history as the first ever ocean to ocean highway route. In 1925, the federal Joint Board on Interstate Highways created U.S. Route 80, largely following the route of the Dixie Overland Highway.

== History ==
Established in 1914 by the Automobile Club of Savannah, the Dixie Overland Highway auto trail was the first major route connecting San Diego, California, and Savannah, Georgia. In July 1914, the Automobile Club of Savannah, Georgia, made a path-finding tour across the state of Georgia to Columbus. They found a practical route, constructed road made up about one-half of the route. A meeting was held in Columbus. It was determined to secure the construction of the entire highway. The cross Georgia highway continued to stretch the idea suggested by the pioneers, and a sea-to-sea highway.

An association was formed, officers were elected, and a plan of operation agreed voted upon. Construction was promoted and the use of the highway would be through the states of Georgia, Alabama, Mississippi, Louisiana, Texas, New Mexico, Arizona, and California. After investigating and researching where the most efficient points of interest would be in order to determine the location of the highway, a practical route was found, connecting the cities of Savannah, Columbus, Montgomery, Selma, Meridian, Jackson, Vicksburg, Shreveport, Dallas, Fort Worth, Alamogordo, El Paso, Lordsburg, Douglas, Phoenix, Yuma, San Diego, and Los Angeles, which were almost guaranteed to never be snowbound, and provide all-year road access.

It was then developed that the Dixie Overland Highway when constructed would be the shortest, straightest, and only year-round, ocean-to-ocean highway, in the United States. All highways east of the Mississippi and the most of those west of the river, were laid out for north and south travel. Making history as one of the most useful and historically important highways in the south. Especially valuable for military purposes due to the short distance freight.

The first meeting of the Dixie Overland Highway Association was held in Columbus on July 17, 1914, to celebrate the arrival of the pathfinders from Savannah. An organization was appointed. The following year, on July 24, the association met in Savannah for its second meeting. It received reports that the highway project was then about 50 percent constructed. The members then formed a permanent organization. On February 14, 1917, the Dixie Overland Highway Association was incorporated in the state of Georgia for a 20-year period as a nonprofit organization, Its purposes are to foster the construction and use of a highway from Savannah, Georgia, to Los Angeles, California, through eight states, seventy-four counties and nearly two hundred towns and villages; to strive for uniform, wise and equitable road legislation in the states of Georgia, Alabama, Mississippi, Louisiana, Texas, New Mexico, Arizona and California; to aid in bringing about efficient road administration; to seek continuous and systematic maintenance of all roads and their classification according to traffic requirements; to promote cooperation in 'units' or 'locals' on the parts of towns, cities, communities, precincts and other political subdivisions; to mark the highway; to give publicity to its historical character, by monuments, guide-books, bulletins and other printed matter; to affiliate and cooperate with other good roads associations. The Dixie Overland Highway Association debated on a definitive western end point for the Dixie Overland Highway in southern California. California politicians Stanley Hufflund and Ed Fletcher convinced the association in an August 1918 meeting to choose San Diego over Los Angeles. In May 1919, the Executive Committee of the Dixie Overland Highway Association approved San Diego as the western terminus and elected Colonel Ed Fletcher to be president of the association.

== Colonel Ed Fletcher ==
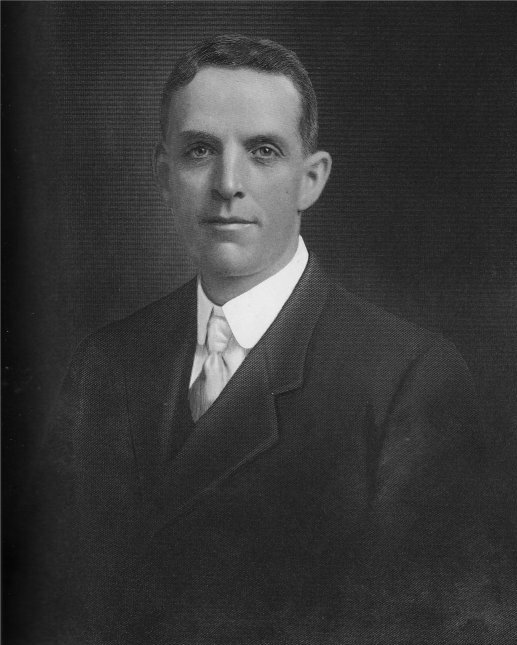

Colonel Ed Fletcher began his San Diego career as a produce merchant, but branched out into water and land development. He and other San Diego boosters recognized that one of the main obstacles to its development was Los Angeles. Early in the century, Los Angeles, unlike San Diego, had a direct rail link to the east. In his self-published 1952 book Memoirs of Ed Fletcher, he described the celebration of the construction of the Dixie Overland Highway as a "gala occasion." Fletcher reprinted a tribute written two decades later called "A crystallized Hope" in the tribute it was stated that, "Newspapers in the southwest corner of America tell of another remarkable achievement—the completion of a national highway between San Diego and Phoenix with only 20 miles [32 km] unpaved between El Paso and San Diego. Twenty years ago this thing was projected as a dream of a super-realtor in San Diego, Ed Fletcher, and in the mind and heart of Governor Hunt, of Arizona. When the thing was started the projectors had to go by rail by way of Los Angeles in order to get to Yuma."

In December 1911, 84 delegates from Arizona, California, and New Mexico met in Phoenix, Arizona, to form the Ocean-to-Ocean Transcontinental Highway Association. The goal was to select a route and promote construction of a highway across the country. Colonel Fletcher continued promoting a transcontinental route for San Diego. In 1912, he joined with other prominent San Diego citizens who raised $3,000 (equivalent to $97,700 in 2024) as prize money and challenged Los Angeles interests to a race to Phoenix. Residents of Phoenix added $1,000 (equivalent to $32,600 in 2024) in prize money. The competition began with a pathfinder race. Fletcher drove San Diego's entry, a Franklin provided by the Tribune-Gazette, from San Diego by way of El Centro, a distance of 360 miles (580 km). He arrived in Phoenix after a trip of 19 hours. The Los Angeles entry traveled by way of Blythe, a distance of about 425 miles (684 km)—or would have if the car had not broken down in the desert. The vehicle never reached Phoenix. The race had been part of a series of races that began in 1908, when the Automobile Club of Southern California conceived the idea as a way of promoting the Good Roads Movement.

There were raised many concerns about building the road from San Diego to Georgia, such as the sand dunes and desert territory that would need to be crossed, Fletcher continued to stay an activist and fight for the road to be built in San Diego. After years of fighting, Fletcher convinced the association in an August 1918 meeting to choose San Diego over Los Angeles. In May 1919, the Executive Committee of the Dixie Overland Highway Association approved San Diego as the western terminus, and elected Fletcher to be president of the association.

== U.S. Route 80 today ==
Historic Route sign seen on California US 80

Although The Dixie Overland Highway may contemporaneously be known as U.S. Route 80 (US 80), it was still the first road to reach the goal of developing an ocean-to-ocean highway system. The United States Numbered Highway System was created in November 1926, turning the Dixie Overland Highway into US 80. The only parts of the DOH that were not incorporated into US 80 were three sections in Georgia, two short sections in Alabama, and one across western Texas. US 80 today runs 161 miles (259 km). The entire segment west of Dallas, Texas, has been decommissioned in favor of various Interstate Highways and state highways. Currently, the highway's western terminus is at an interchange with Interstate 30 (I-30) on the Dallas–Mesquite, Texas city line. The highway's eastern terminus is in Tybee Island, Georgia near the interchange of I-516 and US 17 in Savannah, at the intersection of State Route 26, Butler Avenue, Inlet Avenue, and Tybrisa Street, near the Atlantic Ocean. Between Jonesville, Texas, and Kewanee, Mississippi, US 80 runs parallel to or concurrently with I-20. US 80 also currently runs through Dallas, Texas; Shreveport, Louisiana; Jackson, Mississippi; Montgomery, Alabama; Columbus, Georgia; Macon, Georgia; and Savannah, Georgia.

Throughout the 1950s, US 80 grew to become a popular highway that often competed with US 66. At one point, more cars were recorded entering California on US 80 than on US 66. Like US 66, US 80 would grow to become a keystone highway in shaping American car culture. This period of renaissance would be short lived, with the creation of the Interstate and Defense Highway System in 1957. Four Interstates were slated to replace US 80 as a major highway; Interstate 8 between San Diego and Yuma, Arizona, Interstate 10 between Tucson and Pecos, Texas, Interstate 20 between Pecos and Meridian, Mississippi and Interstate 16 between Macon, Georgia and Savannah.

Between 1964 and 1991, US 80 was slowly removed in increments between Dallas and San Diego. US 80 was seen as obsolete to the western states, which favored the new Interstate highways in its place. As such, US 80 is no longer an active U.S. Highway in California, Arizona, New Mexico and western Texas. Today, I-8, I-10 and I-20 have largely replaced US 80 between Dallas and San Diego. Notable surviving sections of old US 80 include the entirety of both New Mexico State Road 80 and Arizona State Route 80, and all of County Route S80 in Imperial County, California. Other former sections of US 80, particularly in California and parts of Arizona, carry the title Old Highway 80 or similar variations of that name. Multiple efforts are working to designate whole sections of US 80 as a historic route. California became the first state to recognize Historic U.S. Route 80 in 2007. As of 2018, the states of California, Arizona and Louisiana recognize former and current sections of US 80 as a historic route.

== See also ==
- Good Roads Movement
- U.S. Route 62
