= Cambray, New Mexico =

- Unincorporated community
- Location within New Mexico Location within the United States
- Coordinates: 32°13′32″N 107°19′29″W
- Country: United States
- State: New Mexico
- County: Luna
- Established: 1892
- Elevation: 4,219 ft (1,286 m)
- Time zone: UTC-7 (Mountain (MST))
  - Summer (DST): UTC-6 (MDT)
- ZIP codes: 88030
- GNIS feature ID: 898524

Cambray is a locality in eastern Luna County, New Mexico at an elevation of 4,219 feet (1,286 m). It is located one mile west of the Doña Ana county line. Cambray was first a water stop on the Southern Pacific Railroad, then a stop along U.S. Route 70 and U.S. Route 80. When the highway was realigned in 1956, Cambray slowly fell into decline and became a ghost town.

== History ==
Cambray was established in 1892, and the Southern Pacific Railroad drilled a well to create a water stop. The location was recognized by the United States Postal Service as a mailing destination in 1893. The main automobile route through Cambray was originally part of State Road 4. In 1917, the Dixie Overland Highway, a transcontinental auto trail, was established over Route 4 through Cambray and became the main highway between Deming and El Paso, Texas.

The Bankhead Highway was added to the route in 1920, followed by the Old Spanish Trail in 1923. On November 11, 1926, the highway was added to the newly created U.S. Highway System as U.S. Route 80. Cambray would enjoy a short but successful second life as a stop along the new US 80 and US 70 when the latter highway was also designated over the route. During the 1930s, the Civilian Conservation Corps constructed a highway overpass over the Southern Pacific Railroad and built several irrigation canals as part of the New Deal program.

The CCC workers were housed in an auto court on the side of US 80 in Cambray and did most of their business at the town's general store. During the mid 20th Century, Cambray enjoyed a peak population of 75 residents. The end of the small town's success arrived in 1956, when US 70 and US 80 were re-aligned onto a new highway bypassing Cambray. Today, the newer route is part of Interstate 10. The population fell to a single family and the roadside businesses closed. Many of the abandoned buildings fell into disrepair as Cambray became a ghost town. The only dedicated road serving Cambray is still the former route of US 70 and US 80, now New Mexico State Road 549.

== See also ==
- U.S. Route 80 in New Mexico
- U.S. Route 70 in New Mexico
- Interstate 10
- List of ghost towns in New Mexico
