= Kewanee, Mississippi =

- Unincorporated community
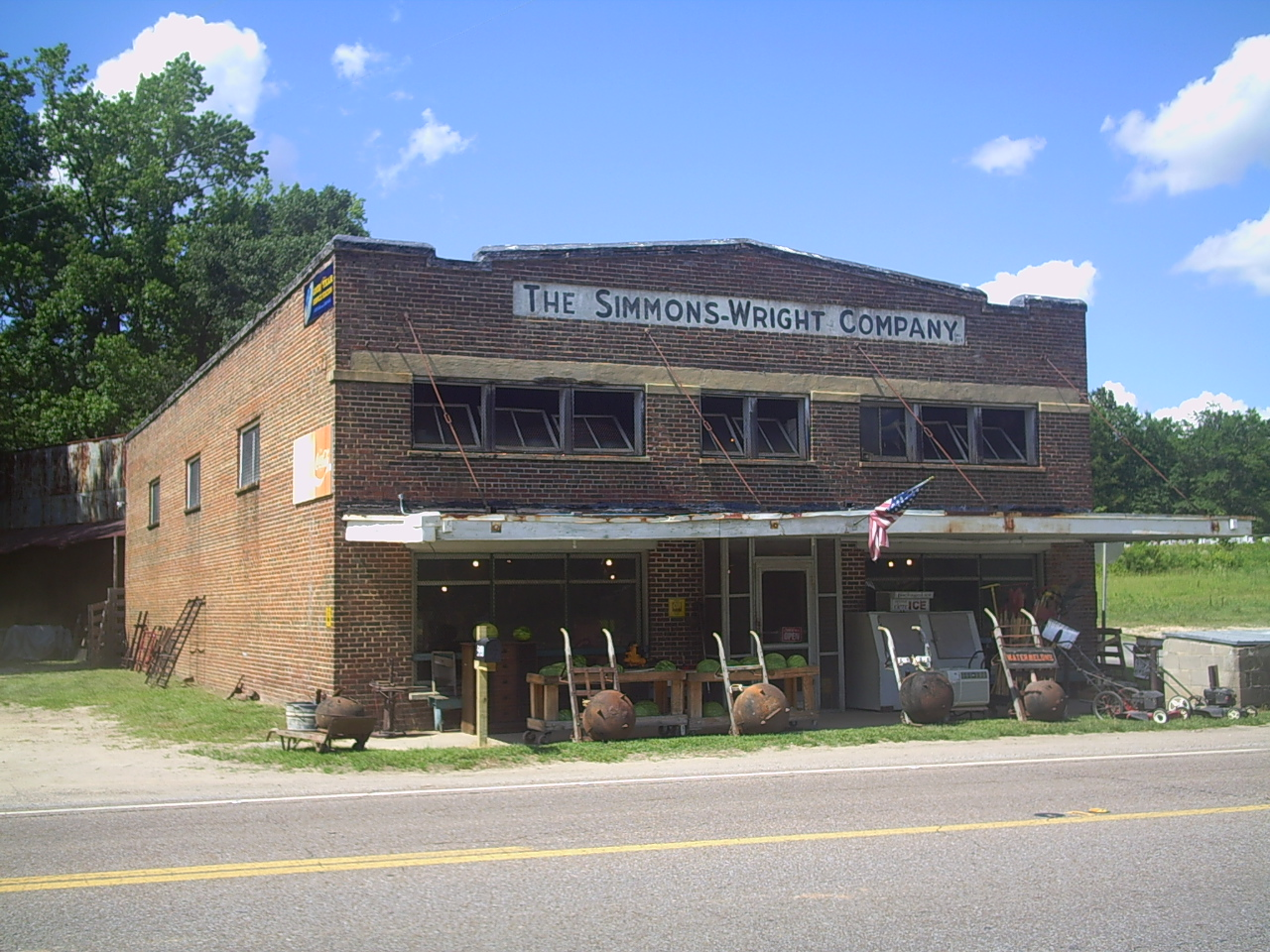
- The Simmons & Wright Company in Kewanee

- Location within Mississippi Location within the United States
- Coordinates: 32°25′27″N 88°26′18″W
- Country: United States
- State: Mississippi
- County: Lauderdale
- Elevation: 282 ft (86 m)
- Time zone: UTC-6 (Central (CST))
  - Summer (DST): UTC-5 (CDT)
- Area codes: 601 & 769
- GNIS feature ID: 691977

Kewanee is an unincorporated community in Lauderdale County, Mississippi, United States. Kewanee is located along U.S. Route 11 and U.S. Route 80 16 miles (26 km) east-northeast of Meridian. The community is located on the former Alabama Great Southern Railroad and in 1900 had a population of 50 people.

The community's name may be a transfer from Kewanee, Illinois.

The Simmons & Wright Company, listed on the National Register of Historic Places, is located in Kewanee.
