= Lordsburg, New Mexico =

- City
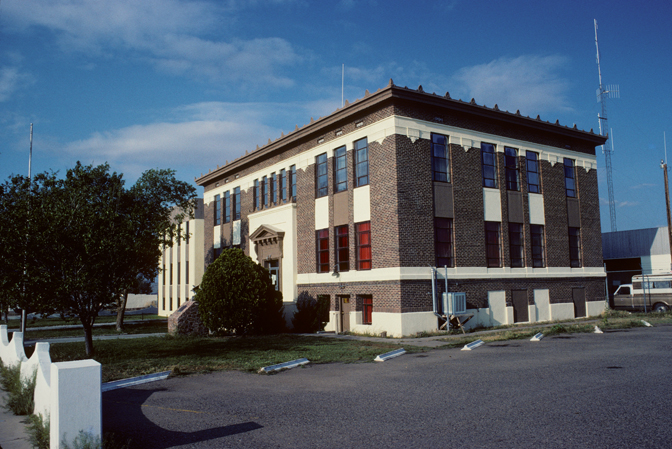
- Hidalgo County Courthouse in Lordsburg

- Location of Lordsburg in New Mexico

- Location in the United States
- Coordinates: 32°20′38″N 108°42′08″W
- Country: United States
- State: New Mexico
- County: Hidalgo
- Founded: 1880

Government
  - Mayor: Robert Barrera

Area
  - Total: 8.42 sq mi (21.82 km^{2})
  - Land: 8.42 sq mi (21.82 km^{2})
  - Water: 0 sq mi (0.00 km^{2})
- Elevation: 4,269 ft (1,301 m)

Population (2020)
  - Total: 2,335
  - Density: 277.2/sq mi (107.01/km^{2})
- Time zone: UTC-7 (MST)
  - Summer (DST): UTC-6 (MDT)
- ZIP codes: 88009, 88045
- Area code: 575
- FIPS code: 35-42180
- GNIS feature ID: 2410872
- Website: cityoflordsburg.com

Lordsburg is a city in and the county seat of Hidalgo County, New Mexico, United States. Hidalgo County includes the southern "bootheel" of New Mexico, along the Arizona border. The population was 2,335 at the 2020 census.

== History ==
Lordsburg was founded in 1880 on the route of the Southern Pacific Railroad. The Continental Divide Trail starts at the Crazy Cook Monument and travels through Lordsburg. Local lore is that Billy the Kid washed dishes in Lordsburg hotel kitchens such as the Stratford Hotel, and La Fonda, the historic "inn at the end of the Santa Fe Trail" during his teenage years.

=== New Mexico state song ===
Lordsburg is the birthplace of the official New Mexico state song, "O Fair New Mexico". It was written by Lordsburg resident Elizabeth Garrett, the blind daughter of famed sheriff Pat Garrett. In 1917, Governor Washington Ellsworth Lindsey signed the legislation making it the official state song. In 1928, John Philip Sousa presented Governor Arthur T. Hannett and the people of New Mexico an arrangement of the state song embracing a musical story of the Indian, the cavalry, the Spanish and the Mexican.

=== Lordsburg Municipal Airport ===
The Lordsburg Municipal Airport (KLSB) began operations in the mid-1920s and was the first airport in New Mexico. Initially the airfield was a cleared parcel of land where pilots could take off and land in any direction. Dirt runways were later constructed. In 1927, Lordsburg was one of the stops on Charles Lindbergh's transcontinental Spirit of Saint Louis air tour. In the early 1950s the airport was served by the original Frontier Airlines (1950–1986), which flew DC-3s on a route from El Paso to Phoenix that included stops at Las Cruces, Deming, and Lordsburg, as well as Clifton, Safford, and Tucson, Arizona. In the mid-1970s one runway had to be relocated to permit the construction of Interstate 10 around Lordsburg and a new paved runway was then constructed. The airport is owned by the City of Lordsburg and is southeast, about one mile outside the city limits.

=== World War II ===
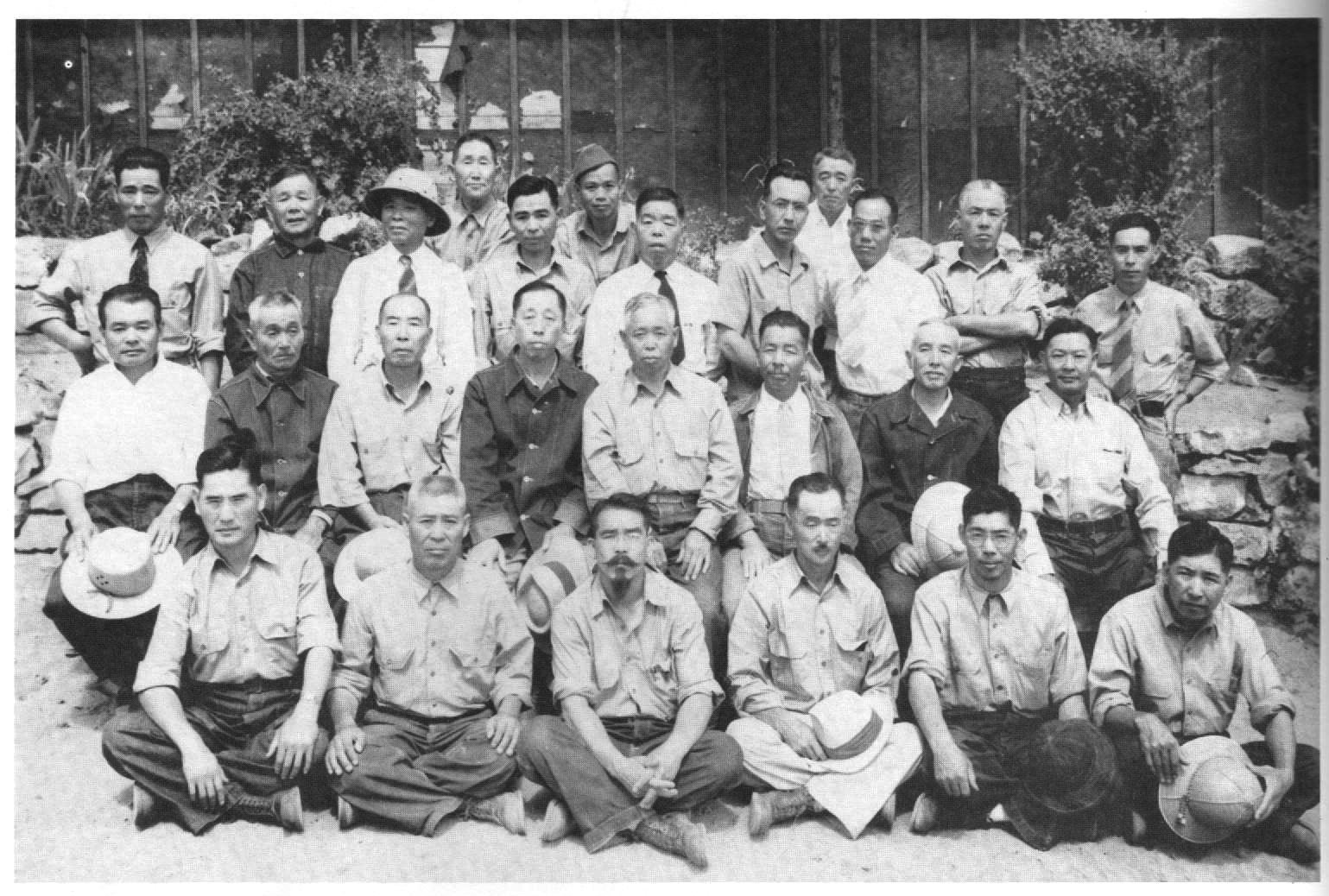
Japanese internees from the Monterey, Salinas, and Watsonville areas of California, at Camp Lordsburg in New Mexico during World War II. 1942-43

Lordsburg held as many as 1,500 Japanese Americans in a Japanese American internment camp operated by the U.S. Army during World War II. On July 27, 1942, shortly after the Lordsburg Internment Camp was opened, Private First Class Clarence Burleson, a sentry at the facility, allegedly shot two Japanese American internees under questionable circumstances. One of the victims, Hirota Isomura, apparently died instantly. The other, Toshiro Kobata, died before dawn. After a military investigation and court-martial, Burleson was found to have lawfully killed the two men. The camp operated until July 1943. The incident inspired an episode of the new Hawaii 5-0 series, "Ho'oani Makuakane", Episode 4/9 (original air date December 13, 2013).

The camp at Lordsburg also held captured German and Italian soldiers.

=== Rest stop ===
For many years, Lordsburg has been a popular rest stop for people traveling to and from the West Coast by car on Interstate 10 and its precursor highway, U.S. Route 80. At 641 miles (1,032 km) from downtown Los Angeles, Lordsburg can comfortably be reached by car in less than one day. As Lordsburg had one of the few motels in the Southwest that would accept black guests (El Paso being a notable exception), it was especially popular with black travelers in the mid-20th century during the end of legal segregation.

Lordsburg has 12 motels and hotels, totaling over 300 rooms.

== Geography ==
Lordsburg is in northern Hidalgo County, at the intersection of Interstate 10 and U.S. Route 70. I-10 leads east 60 miles (97 km) to Deming and 120 miles (190 km) to Las Cruces, while to the west it leads 155 miles (249 km) to Tucson, Arizona. US 70 follows I-10 to the east out of Lordsburg but leads northwest 153 miles (246 km) to its terminus at Globe, Arizona.

According to the United States Census Bureau, Lordsburg has a total area of 8.4 square miles (21.7 km^{2}), all land.

=== Climate ===
Lordsburg has a semi-arid climate (Köppen BSk), just avoiding designation as a desert climate (BWk).

Typical for the more southerly and lower elevations of the Intermountain West, summers are extremely hot during the daytime, with maxima above 90 °F or 32.2 °C for over four months on an average of 122 afternoons during a full year. 100 °F or 37.8 °C is exceeded on average during 30 afternoons each year, and the record high of 114 °F (45.6 °C) was set during a notorious southwestern heatwave on June 27, 1994. Humidity in early summer is very low, but increases in late summer due to the monsoon, which, between July and early October brings the majority of the year's limited precipitation. From October temperatures cool off rapidly, and by November most mornings are below 32 °F or 0 °C, but afternoons remains comfortable to warm all through the winter, with only 10.1 afternoons failing to reach 50 °F or 10 °C and only one afternoon every two years not topping freezing. Minima fall below freezing on an average of 108 mornings, but 0 °F or −17.8 °C has been reached only during two exceptional cold waves in January 1962 and December 1978, when the record low of −14 °F or −25.6 °C was reached on the 9th.

Except for the freakishly wet December 1991 when 4.55 inches (115.6 mm) fell from a series of subtropical cyclones, monthly rainfalls above four inches or 100 millimeters are restricted to the monsoon season: the wettest month between 1971 and 2000 was July 1981 with 5.34 inches (135.6 mm). The wettest day has been June 28 of 1981 with 3.00 inches or 76.2 millimeters. Snowfall is very rare; the median for the year is zero and the mean only 3.5 inches or 0.089 meters; with the heaviest snowfall between 1971 and 2000 being 11.0 inches or 0.28 meters during December 25–26, 1987.

Climate data for Lordsburg 4 SE, New Mexico (1991 to 2020; extremes 1948 to 2001)
Month	Jan	Feb	Mar	Apr	May	Jun	Jul	Aug	Sep	Oct	Nov	Dec	Year
Record high °F (°C)	80 (27)	85 (29)	93 (34)	100 (38)	106 (41)	114 (46)	110 (43)	109 (43)	104 (40)	98 (37)	86 (30)	76 (24)	114 (46)
Mean daily maximum °F (°C)	60.5 (15.8)	65.5 (18.6)	73.3 (22.9)	82.2 (27.9)	90.8 (32.7)	99.5 (37.5)	98.6 (37.0)	96.2 (35.7)	91.4 (33.0)	82.4 (28.0)	70.2 (21.2)	59.0 (15.0)	80.8 (27.1)
Mean daily minimum °F (°C)	25.2 (−3.8)	28.2 (−2.1)	32.8 (0.4)	37.9 (3.3)	47.8 (8.8)	58.1 (14.5)	65.1 (18.4)	63.2 (17.3)	56.1 (13.4)	43.4 (6.3)	30.7 (−0.7)	25.6 (−3.6)	42.8 (6.0)
Record low °F (°C)	−9 (−23)	3 (−16)	11 (−12)	12 (−11)	24 (−4)	35 (2)	49 (9)	42 (6)	36 (2)	19 (−7)	8 (−13)	−14 (−26)	−14 (−26)
Average rainfall inches (mm)	0.88 (22)	0.79 (20)	0.60 (15)	0.25 (6.4)	0.25 (6.4)	0.34 (8.6)	2.12 (54)	2.17 (55)	1.21 (31)	0.73 (19)	0.79 (20)	1.19 (30)	11.32 (287.4)
Average snowfall inches (cm)	1 (2.5)	1 (2.5)	0 (0)	0 (0)	0 (0)	0 (0)	0 (0)	0 (0)	0 (0)	0 (0)	0 (0)	2 (5.1)	4 (10.1)
Average rainy days (≥ 0.01 inch)	4.7	4.2	4.2	1.7	2.1	2.2	8.0	7.5	4.8	4.6	2.9	4.2	51.1
Source 1: National Oceanic and Atmospheric Administration
Source 2: Weather Atlas

== Demographics ==
Historical population
Census	Pop.	Note	%±
1920	1,325		—
1930	2,069		56.2%
1940	3,101		49.9%
1950	3,525		13.7%
1960	3,436		−2.5%
1970	3,429		−0.2%
1980	3,195		−6.8%
1990	2,951		−7.6%
2000	3,379		14.5%
2010	2,797		−17.2%
2020	2,335		−16.5%
U.S. Decennial Census

=== 2020 census ===
As of the 2020 census, Lordsburg had a population of 2,335. The median age was 39.2 years. 24.7% of residents were under the age of 18 and 18.4% of residents were 65 years of age or older. For every 100 females there were 95.9 males, and for every 100 females age 18 and over there were 98.0 males age 18 and over.

0.0% of residents lived in urban areas, while 100.0% lived in rural areas.

There were 938 households in Lordsburg, of which 32.0% had children under the age of 18 living in them. Of all households, 34.0% were married-couple households, 25.9% were households with a male householder and no spouse or partner present, and 32.1% were households with a female householder and no spouse or partner present. About 34.4% of all households were made up of individuals and 13.8% had someone living alone who was 65 years of age or older.

There were 1,219 housing units, of which 23.1% were vacant. The homeowner vacancy rate was 2.1% and the rental vacancy rate was 23.6%.

Racial composition as of the 2020 census
Race	Number	Percent
White	1,185	50.7%
Black or African American	8	0.3%
American Indian and Alaska Native	27	1.2%
Asian	7	0.3%
Native Hawaiian and Other Pacific Islander	4	0.2%
Some other race	341	14.6%
Two or more races	763	32.7%
Hispanic or Latino (of any race)	1,884	80.7%

=== 2000 census ===
As of the census of 2000, there were 3,379 people, 1,220 households, and 854 families residing in the city. The population density was 403.1 inhabitants per square mile (155.6/km^{2}). There were 1,414 housing units at an average density of 168.7 per square mile (65.1/km^{2}). The racial makeup of the city was 80.70% White, 0.56% African American, 0.77% Native American, 0.50% Asian, 13.97% from other races, and 3.49% from two or more races. Hispanic or Latino of any race were 74.43% of the population.

There were 1,220 households, out of which 36.9% had children under the age of 18 living with them, 46.5% were married couples living together, 18.6% had a female householder with no husband present, and 30.0% were non-families. 27.3% of all households were made up of individuals, and 12.4% had someone living alone who was 65 years of age or older. The average household size was 2.70 and the average family size was 3.31.

In the city, the population was spread out, with 31.9% under the age of 18, 8.5% from 18 to 24, 25.6% from 25 to 44, 18.9% from 45 to 64, and 15.0% who were 65 years of age or older. The median age was 33 years. For every 100 females, there were 94.8 males. For every 100 females age 18 and over, there were 89.4 males.

The median income for a household in the city was $21,036, and the median income for a family was $28,026. Males had a median income of $25,952 versus $18,177 for females. The per capita income for the city was $10,877. About 28.6% of families and 32.7% of the population were below the poverty line, including 47.5% of those under age 18 and 19.3% of those age 65 or over.

== Education ==
Lordsburg High School's mascot is the Maverick. Its school colors are orange and black. Students compete in football, volleyball, boys' basketball, girls' basketball, cheer, and boys' and girls' track and field, baseball and softball.

== Media ==
Lordsburg once had two radio stations. During the 1960s KLHS broadcast on 950 kHz AM with 1,000 watts days. This station later moved to Bayard, 55 miles (89 km) northeast of Lordsburg. The FCC later assigned 97.7 to KXKK in the 1980s, now KPSA-FM; this station has since moved to 98.5.

== Infrastructure ==
=== Transportation ===
==== Bus ====
Greyhound Lines maintains a terminal in Lordsburg.

==== Airports ====
- Lordsburg Municipal Airport: private, charter and military

==== Major highways ====
- I-10
- I-10 BL

==== Rail ====
- Amtrak's Sunset Limited /Texas Eagle combined train route stops at Lordsburg station three times a week in each direction. Eastbound trains depart at 11:43am on Mondays, Thursdays, and Saturdays, while Westbound trains depart at 4:53pm on Sundays, Tuesdays, and Thursdays.
- The Union Pacific Railroad's mainline and the Arizona Eastern Railway with its branch to Clifton, Arizona, serve Lordsburg.
