= Ciénega Bridge =

Historic bridge in Pima County, Arizona

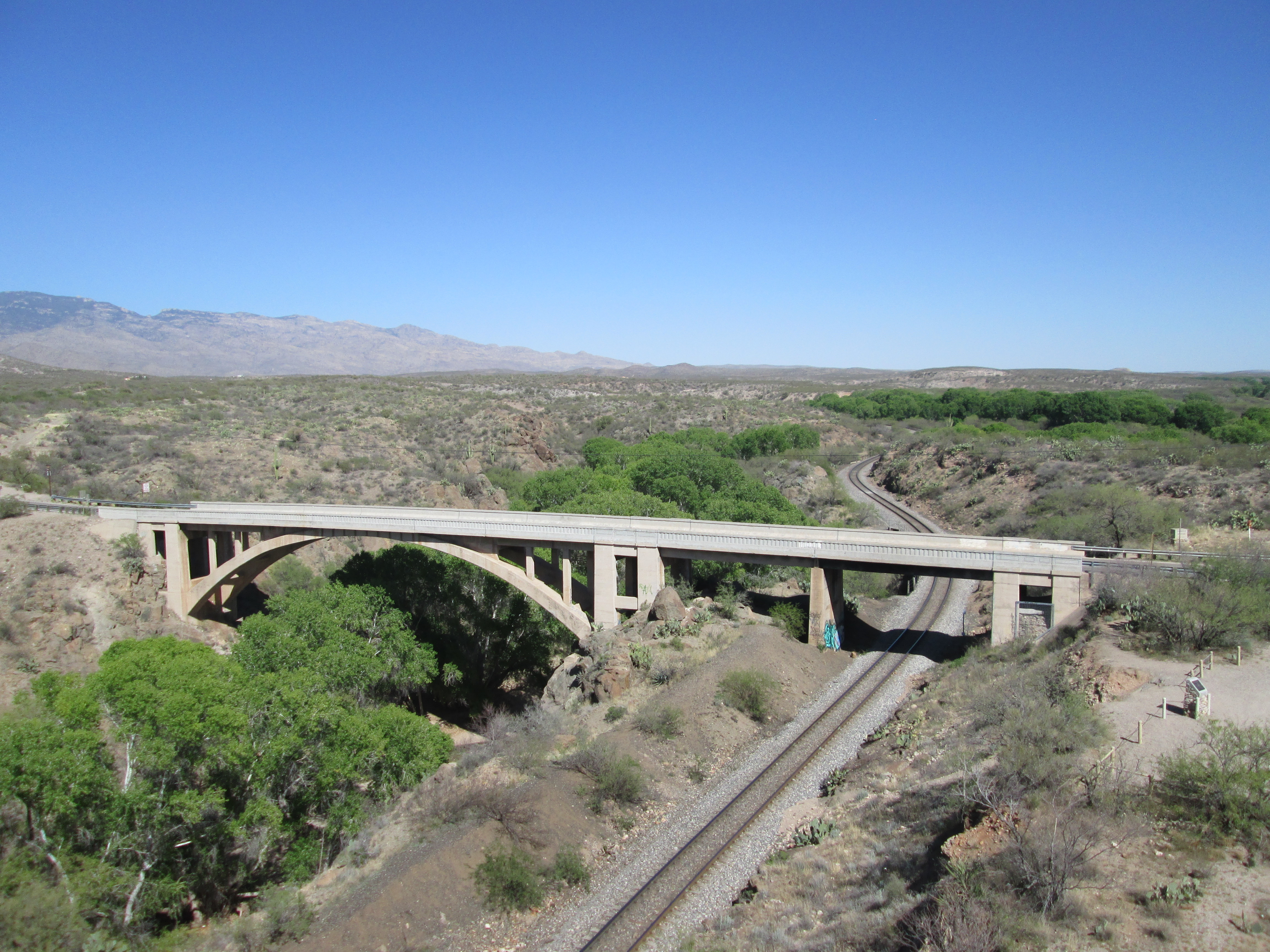
- View of the Ciénega Bridge from the top of Marsh Station Bridge, facing east. The Rincon Mountains are in the background at the left.
- Coordinates: 32°01′11″N 110°38′46″W
- Carries: Marsh Station Road, the Arizona Trail, pedestrians and bicycles US 80 (1926–1955); Historic US 80 (2018–Present)
- Crosses: Ciénega Creek
- Locale: Pima County, Arizona, United States
- Named for: Ciénega Creek
- Owner: Pima County
- Inventory No.: 08293

Characteristics
- Design: Open-spandrel arch
- Material: Concrete
- Pier construction: Steel
- Total length: 277.9 ft (85 m)
- Width: 21.7 ft (7 m)
- Longest span: 146 ft (45 m)
- No. of spans: 5

History
- Designer: Merrill Butler
- Constructed by: English and Pierce; Arizona Highway Department
- Construction start: 1920
- Construction end: March 1921
- Construction cost: $40,000 ($473,063 as of 2024)
- Rebuilt: 1989 (Replacement of Guardrails)
- Ciénega Bridge
- U.S. National Register of Historic Places
- Location within Arizona Location within the United States
- Nearest city: Vail, Arizona
- Coordinates: 32°01′11″N 110°38′46″W
- Area: 0.13 acres (0.053 ha)
- Built: 1920 to 1921
- Built by: English and Pierce, Arizona Highway Department
- MPS: Vehicular Bridges in Arizona MPS
- NRHP reference No.: 88001642
- Added to NRHP: September 30, 1988

Location
- Interactive map of Ciénega Bridge

Ciénega Bridge is an open-spandrel arch bridge which crosses Ciénega Creek and the Union Pacific Railroad near Vail, Arizona. Originally constructed in 1921, the bridge was part of U.S. Route 80, a major transcontinental highway, from 1926 to 1956. Being the oldest bridge of its kind in Arizona, the Ciénega Bridge is listed on the National Register of Historic Places. The bridge also holds the title of being the longest open-spandrel concrete arch bridge within the state. Currently, the bridge carries Marsh Station Road, which is part of Historic U.S. Route 80 as of 2018.

== History ==
=== Planning and construction ===
In 1920, the Arizona Highway Department began construction on a section of the Borderland Highway in southeastern Arizona. The Borderland Highway was part of the larger Dixie Overland Highway, Bankhead Highway and Old Spanish Trail auto trails, which were important early transcontinental highways. The Highway Department received financial aid for the project from the federal government under Federal Aid Project Number 18 as well as a Pima County bond issue and the Cochise County Road Fund. As part of the highway construction, the Highway Department needed to build a large bridge over a chasm known as Ciénega Canyon, a natural feature of Ciénega Creek, near the town of Vail. Running parallel through the canyon with the creek was the main line of the Southern Pacific Railroad (now part of the Union Pacific Railroad).

State engineers decided to design an open-spandrel concrete arch bridge to cross the canyon. The arch would measure 146 feet (45 m) in length and would be a combination of two tapered ribs connecting the foundation arch to the bridge deck, supplemented by multiple concrete columns, supporting the deck. Paneled bulkheads and concrete guard rails would be placed on the sides of the bridge deck. The part of the bridge spanning the railroad would be a two span section with three piers supported by a concrete girder structure. In total, the bridge would have 5 spans, with four being approach spans. The overall length of the bridge would be 278 feet (85 m) with a width of 23 feet (7 m). The main architect of the bridge was state engineer Merrill Butler. The exact location of the bridge was chosen due to it being the most feasible area to the place the bridge as well as the high solid rocky banks providing added support.

Upon finalizing the bridge design, the Highway Department awarded construction of the bridge to a Tucson based firm called English and Pierce. Construction materials would be provided by the Highway Department. The new bridge was internally referred to as "Section F" of the Borderland Highway construction project. Construction of Ciénega Bridge started in 1920. Over 900 cubic yards (688 m^{3}) of rock had to be blasted to make way for the bridge foundations. The total amount of concrete poured measured 934 cubic yards (714 m^{3}) while the amount of reinforcing steel used weighed over 87,900 pounds (39,871 kg). Erecting of the false work was a risky endeavor, as the contractors had to deal with the possibility of high water levels generated by the creek.

Due to a dispute with the contractor, construction of the bridge was taken over completed by the Highway Department. The Highway Department claimed English and Pierce exceeded the original contracted price necessitating state takeover. Construction of the bridge was completed in March 1921 at a total cost of $40,000 (the equivalent of $473,063 in 2024). Upon completion, the Ciénega Bridge became the longest open–spandrel arch bridge within the state of Arizona, the arch measuring 146 feet (45 m) in length. The arch consisted of twin tapered ribs, both of which were anchored into the concrete foundations of the structure. The Ciénega Bridge continues to remain Arizona's longest open–spandrel arch bridge as of June 2022. Starting in 1926, the Borderland Highway was designated as part of U.S. Route 80, a transcontinental highway, the western and eastern termini of which, were located in Savannah, Georgia (later Tybee Island, Georgia) and San Diego, California, respectively.

=== Bypass and replacement ===
The Ciénega Bridge became a heavily traveled section of US 80, which by the early 1950s, had become one of the most dangerous roads in the state of Arizona. Between 1952 and 1955, 11 motorists had been killed in separate car accidents in relation to the eastern bridge approach design. The eastern approach to the bridge consisted of an eight degree downhill curve just before the foot of the concrete structure. The bridge itself crossed a 100-foot (30 m) chasm above the creek. Motorists were unable to negotiate the dangerous curve, which had resulted in vehicles missing the bridge, driving off the chasm ledge next to the bridge, and landing on to the creek bed below.

Construction started in 1952 on a bypass route which included a new railroad underpass and two wash bridges. The new straighter alignment opened on April 9, 1955, moving US 80 designation off Ciénega Bridge onto a newer bridge downstream. The new Ciénega Bridge was only 10 feet (3.0 m) above the creek as opposed to the original bridge and had a straighter more even graded approach. Upon the opening of the new route, ownership of the old bridge was transferred to Pima County, remaining open to vehicular traffic. The section of US 80 between Tucson and Benson would later be replaced by Interstate 10, with the US 80 designation being retired from this section of highway in 1977. The US 80 designation was fully decommissioned within Arizona by 1989. The Ciénega Bridge was added to the National Register of Historic Places on September 30, 1988.

The majority of the original bridge structure remains unaltered, the exception being the original guardrails, which had been replaced by Jersey barriers in 1989. Although the guardrail replacement has slightly weakened the bridge's overall structural integrity, it does not pose a significant threat. The Ciénega Bridge is the oldest surviving open-spandrel arch bridge in Arizona. As of September 21, 2018, the bridge carries a section of Historic U.S. Route 80, as the Arizona Department of Transportation (ADOT) designated Marsh Station Road as part of the historic route.

== Gallery ==
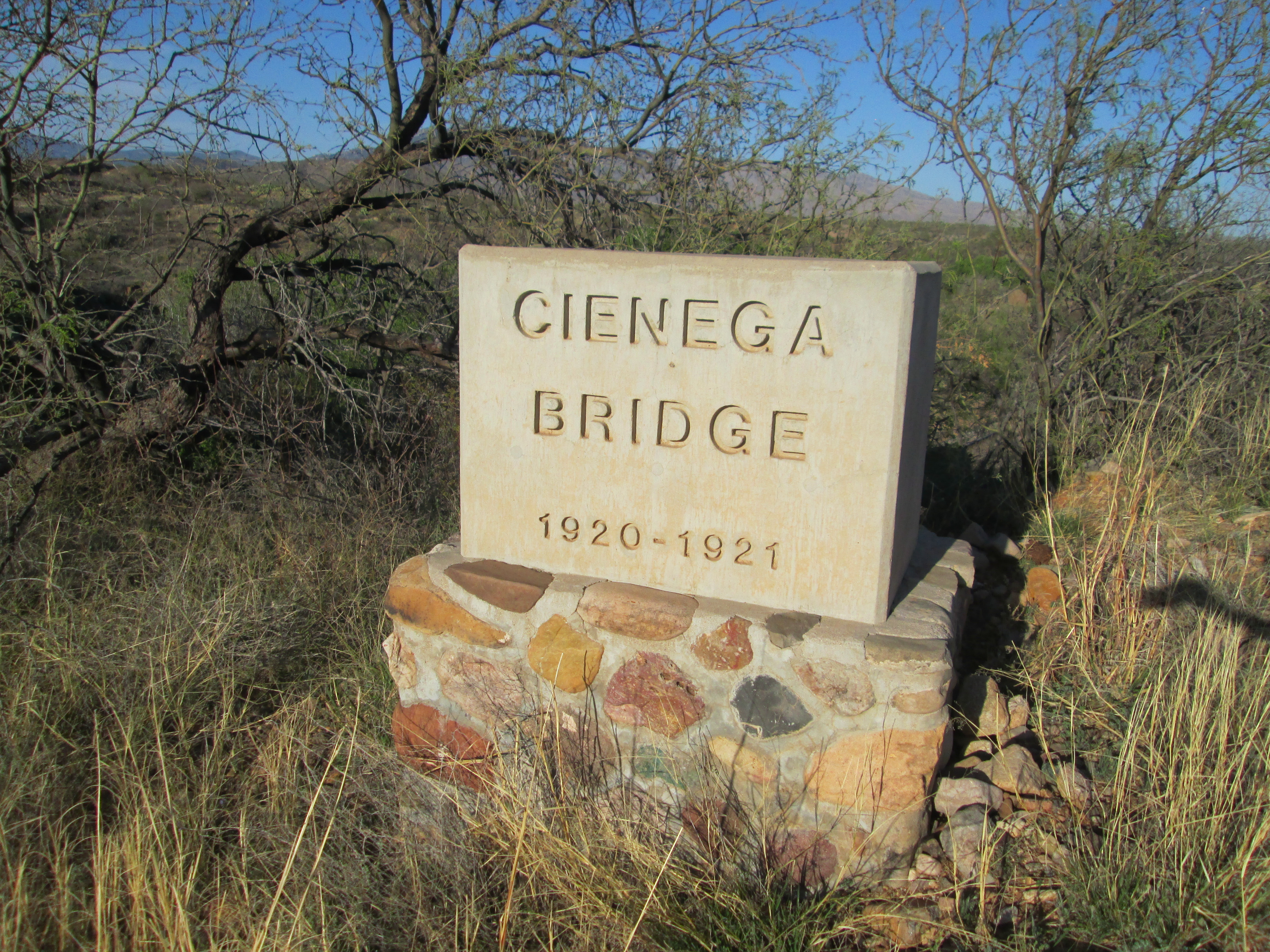
Concrete marker for Ciénega Bridge showing dates of construction.

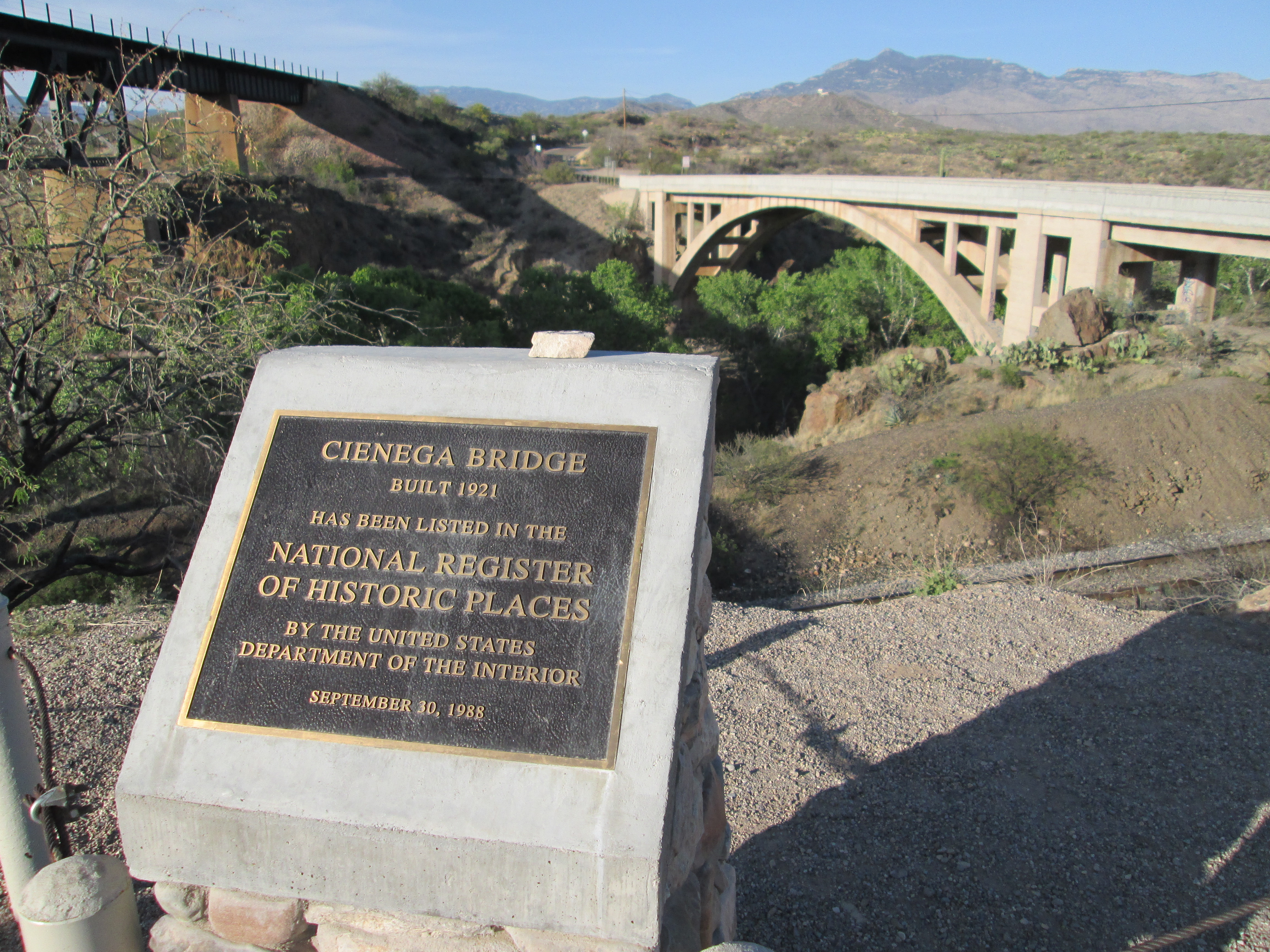
National Register of Historic Places plaque for Ciénega Bridge.

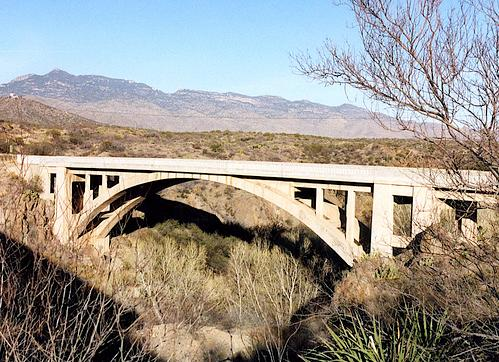
Photograph focusing on the concrete supporting arch of Ciénega Bridge.

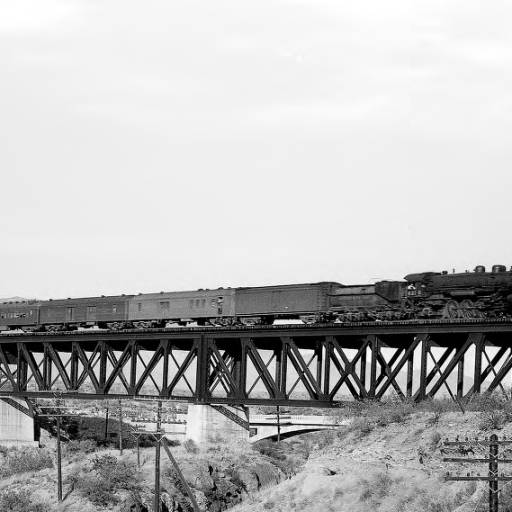
Sunset Limited of the Southern Pacific Railroad being pulled over the old EP&SW bridge with Ciénega Bridge in the background circa 1921.

== See also ==
- U.S. Route 80 in Arizona
- Ocean to Ocean Bridge
- Gillespie Dam Bridge
- List of bridges on the National Register of Historic Places in Arizona
- National Register of Historic Places listings in Pima County, Arizona
