= Cotton Center, Arizona =

- Populated place
- Location within Arizona Location within the United States
- Coordinates: 33°05′14″N 112°40′01″W
- Country: United States
- State: Arizona
- County: Maricopa
- Elevation: 715 ft (218 m)
- Time zone: UTC-7 (Mountain (MST))
  - Summer (DST): UTC-7 (MST)
- Area code: 623
- FIPS code: 04-16315
- GNIS feature ID: 24385

Cotton Center is a populated place situated in Maricopa County, Arizona, United States. It has an estimated elevation of 715 feet (218 m) above sea level. It is located 10 miles north of Gila Bend, Arizona on Old U.S. Route 80.
