= Stone Avenue Underpass =

- U.S. National Register of Historic Places
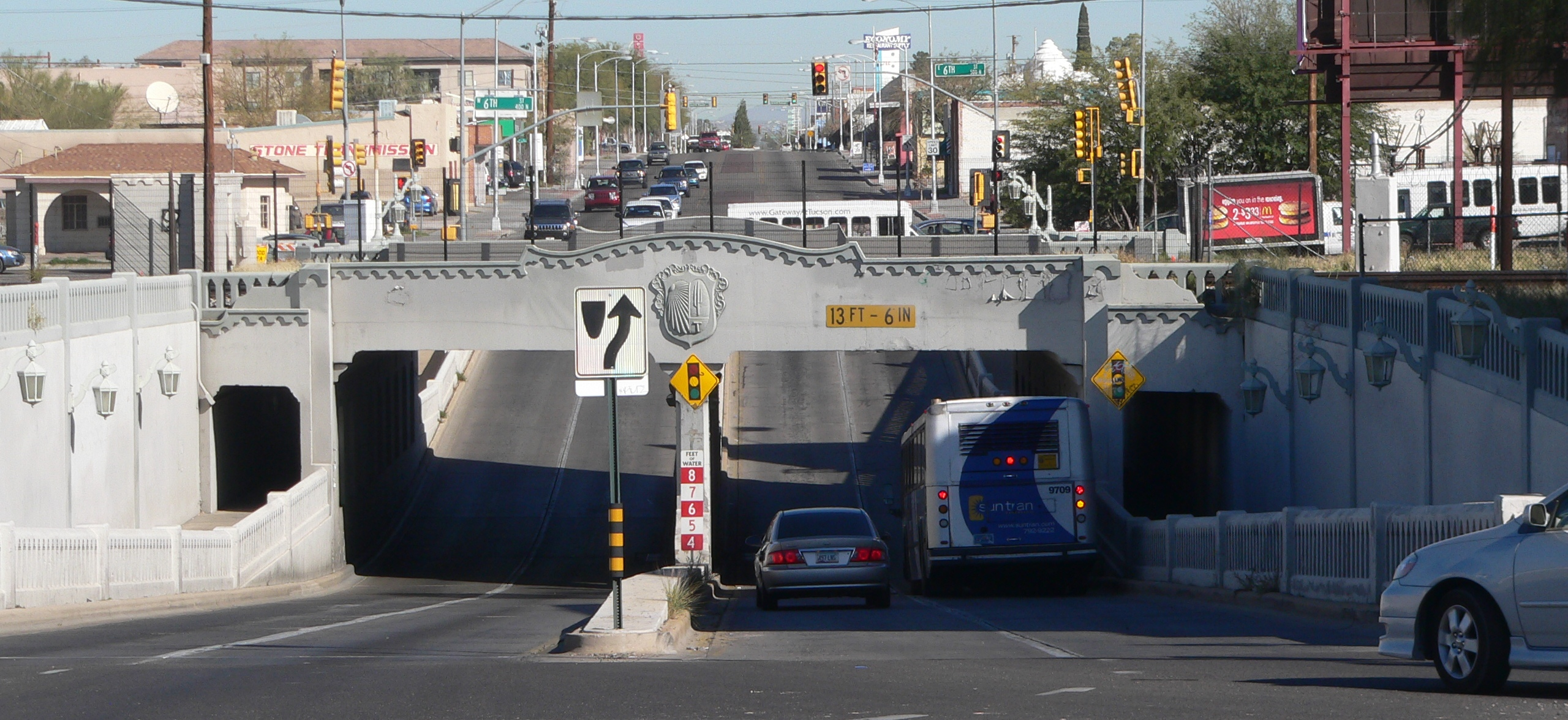

- Location within Arizona Location within the United States
- Location: Stone Ave., Tucson, Arizona
- Coordinates: 32°13′37″N 110°58′16″W
- Area: 0.1 acres (0.040 ha)
- Built: 1936
- Built by: Sundt, M.M.
- Architectural style: Concrete Slab
- MPS: Vehicular Bridges in Arizona MPS
- NRHP reference No.: 88001656
- Added to NRHP: September 30, 1988

The Stone Avenue Underpass, known to native Tucsonans as "Lake Elmira", is a historic underpass on Stone Avenue in Tucson, Arizona.

The underpass was completed in January 1936. It was added to the National Register of Historic Places in 1988. It is located between 6th street and E. Toole Avenue/W. Franklin Street, and carries two lanes in each direction of Stone Ave under the Union Pacific railroad tracks that run through downtown Tucson.

Due to the poor drainage, it fills fast during heavy downpours of rain. For this reason, the underpass was nicknamed Lake Elmira. It was named after the 13 year old Elmira Doakes, by Arizona Daily Star reporter Howard Owetly in the summer of 1937.

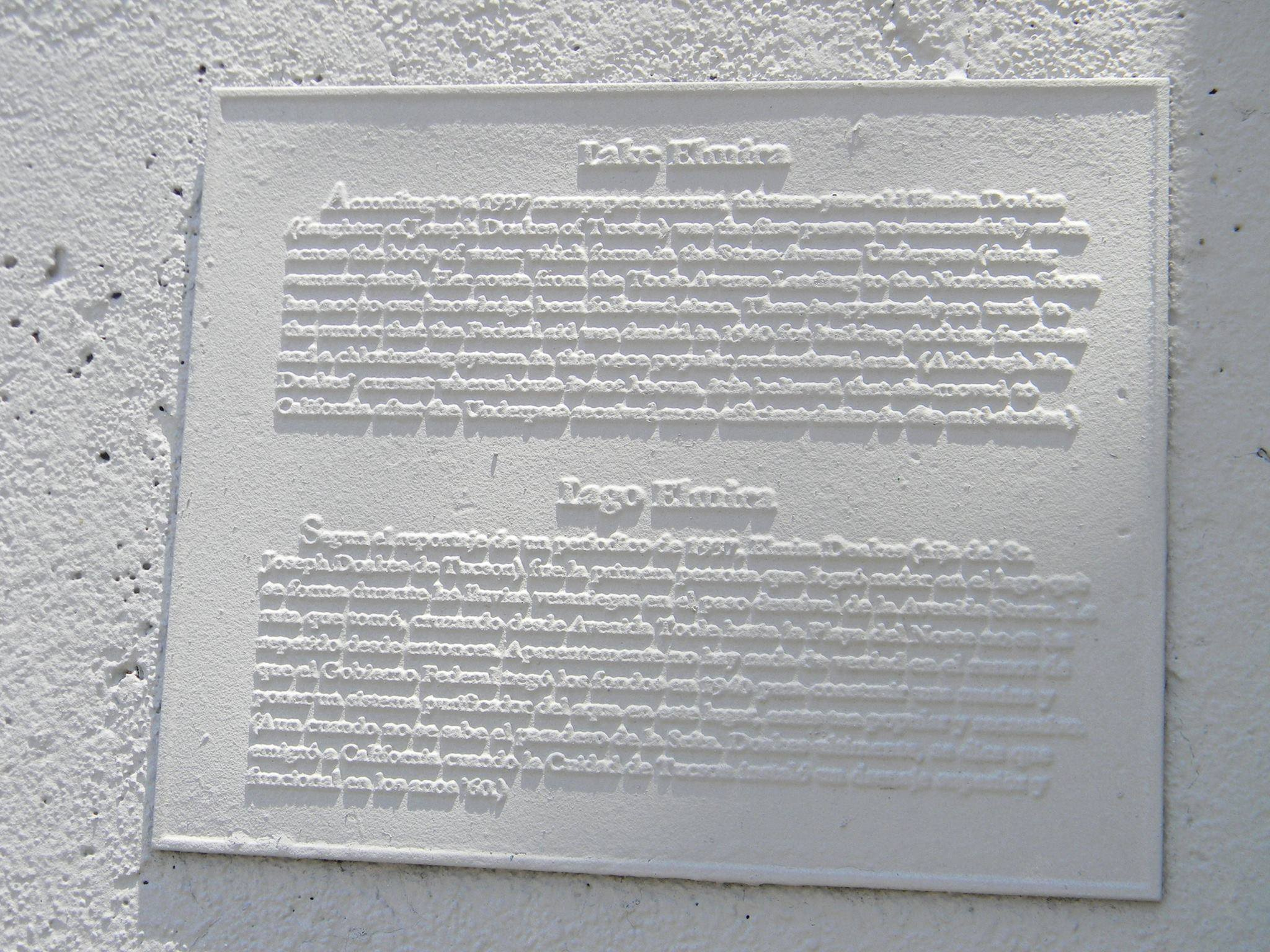
Lake Elmira

In the 1980s, two young history buffs had a zinc plaque made and placed it on one of pillars without permission from the City Of Tucson or The Arizona Historical Society. It reads in English and Spanish:

“Lake Elmira. According to a 1937 newspaper account, thirteen year old Elmira Doakes (daughter of Joseph Doakes of Tucson) was the first person to successfully swim across the body of water which formed in the Stone Avenue Underpass (during summer rains). Her route from the Toole Avenue Landing to the Northern Shore has not to our knowledge been followed since. There is apparently no truth to the rumor that the Federal aid was denied in 1940 for building docking facilities and a chlorinating system in this once popular recreational area. (Although the Doakes current whereabouts is not known, it is believed that she moved to California after the Underpass received more efficient drains in the mid-sixties.
