= Ocean to Ocean Bridge =

NRHP-listed bridge in Arizona

Ocean-to-Ocean Bridge
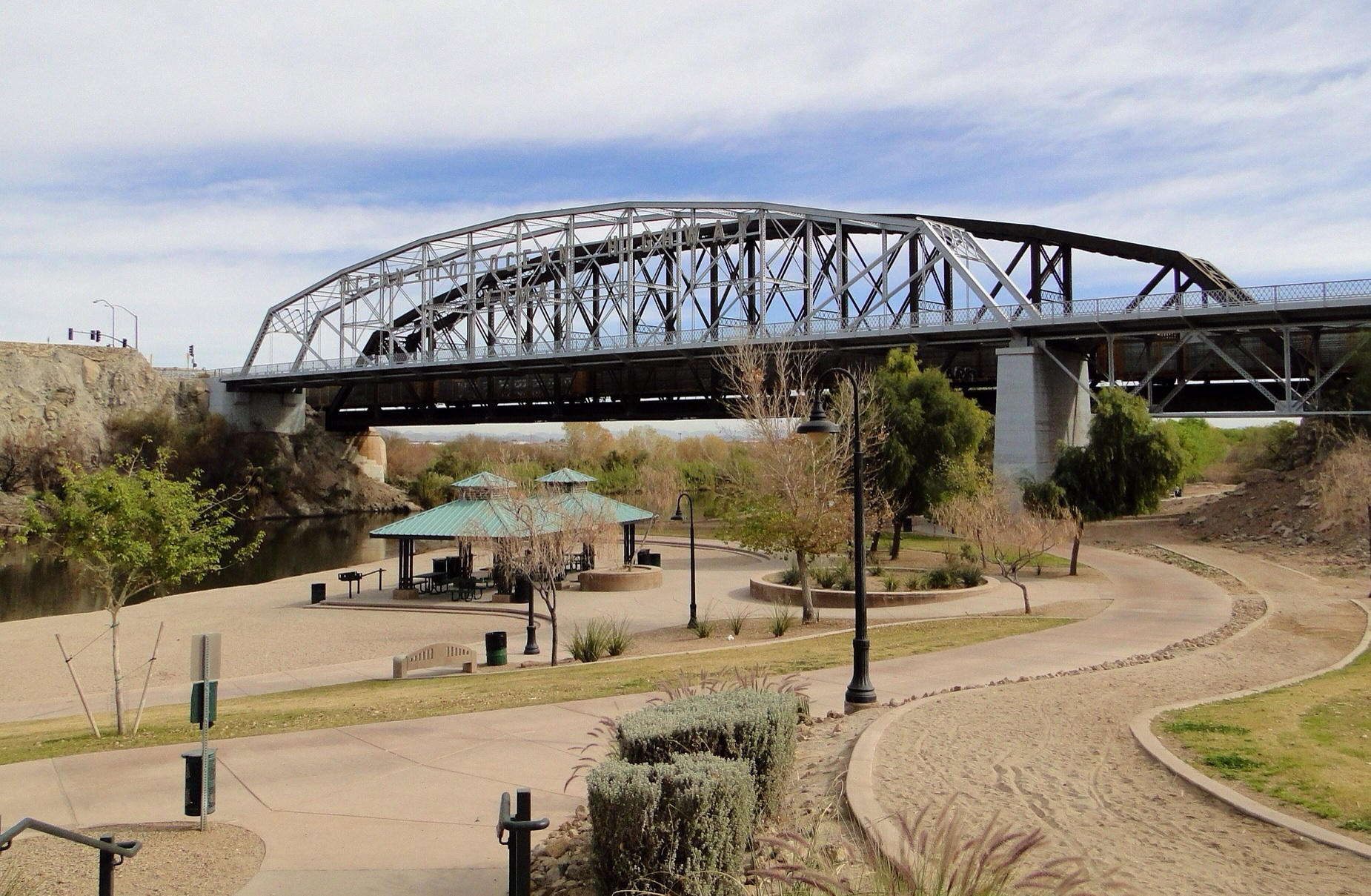
- Coordinates: 32°43′43″N 114°36′56″W
- Carries: Penitentiary Avenue, pedestrians and bicycles Historic US 80
- Crosses: Colorado River
- Locale: Yuma, Arizona, US
- Named for: Ocean-to-Ocean Highway
- Owner: Yuma County, Arizona
- Inventory No.: 08533

Characteristics
- Design: Through truss bridge
- Material: Steel
- Pier construction: Concrete
- Total length: 444 ft (135 m)
- Width: 35 ft (11 m)
- Longest span: 336 ft (102 m)
- No. of spans: 2
- Piers in water: 1

History
- Designer: Bureau of Indian Affairs
- Constructed by: Omaha Structural Steel Works
- Construction start: September 1914
- Construction end: 1915
- Construction cost: $73,800 ($1.7 million as of 2024)
- Opened: 22 May 1915
- Rebuilt: 1943; 2002
- Ocean to Ocean Bridge
- U.S. National Register of Historic Places
- Location within Arizona Location within the United States
- Nearest city: Yuma, Arizona
- Coordinates: 32°43′43″N 114°36′56″W
- Area: 0.2 acres (0.081 ha)
- Built: 1914
- Built by: Omaha Structural Steel Works, Office of Indian Affairs
- MPS: Vehicular Bridges in Arizona MPS
- NRHP reference No.: 79000431
- Added to NRHP: September 11, 1979

Location
- Interactive map of Ocean-to-Ocean Bridge

The Ocean-to-Ocean Bridge is a through truss bridge spanning the Colorado River in Yuma, Arizona. Built in 1915, it was the first highway crossing of the lower Colorado and is the earliest example of a through truss bridge in Arizona. It is also the only example of a Pennsylvania truss within Arizona. Originally the bridge carried the transcontinental Ocean-to-Ocean Highway and later carried its successor, US 80 until a new bridge was built to the west in 1956. Between 1988 and 2001, the bridge was closed to vehicular traffic and only traversable by pedestrians and bicyclists. After a major restoration, the bridge was rehabilitated and reopened to vehicular traffic in 2002, with a re-dedication by the Quechan nation and Yuma Crossing National Heritage Area. The bridge became part of Historic US 80 in 2018.

== History ==
In 1913, following massive pressure against Arizona Congressman Carl Hayden by the citizens of Yuma, Hayden lobbied Congress, proposing federal aid be used for construction of a permanent highway crossing spanning the lower Colorado River. Congress authorized the construction of the bridge under the pretense that it was to be used in connecting Yuma to the Fort Yuma Indian Reservation located on the opposing bank of the river. Because of this justification, the federal funding was provided through the Office of Indian Affairs (OIA). Further capital was raised and provided by the State of Arizona and Imperial County, California, each providing $25,000 (which is $582,004 as of 2024). OIA engineers in Washington D.C. were tasked with designing the new bridge. The new bridge design was to be a steel, Pennsylvania through truss design complemented by a Warren deck truss second span, both resting upon concrete piers and abutments above the river. The location of the bridge was to be upstream from an existing ferry crossing at Prison Hill Road.

The Omaha Structural Steel Works was awarded the construction contract by the OIA in June 1914, at a cost of $73,800 (which is $1.7 million as of 2024). Construction on the bridge began in September 1914. Between October and February, problems arose constructing the bridge, as both Omaha Steel and the OIA were unfamiliar with the currents and flood patterns of the lower Colorado. Falsework erected to aid in the bridge's construction were twice washed downstream by floods. Omaha Steel decided to approach construction of the twin span bridge by a different method; constructing the spans on barges and floating each span down river into position. The 336 ft (102 m) span was floated down river and swung into place carefully and methodically on March 3, 1915, followed by local praise and celebration. Following completion, the Ocean-to-Ocean Bridge was ceremoniously opened to the public on May 22, 1915. The bridge became a crucial link in the nationwide transcontinental Ocean-to-Ocean Highway and was also the first highway bridge across the lower Colorado River.

On November 11, 1926, the bridge became part of U.S. Route 80. The successor to the earlier Ocean-to-Ocean Highway, US 80 became the primary east to west transcontinental highway in Arizona and between the 1920s and 1930s, carried the majority of the state's auto traffic. During the Great Depression in the 1930s, the Ocean-to-Ocean Bridge was used by California state police officers to deny entry refugees of the dust bowl hailing from Oklahoma intending to find work in California. Often called "Okies", these people found work instead around Yuma, County between Yuma and Wellton. The refugees soon provided critically needed assistance to local farmers.

In 1956, US 80 was re-routed off the Ocean-to-Ocean Bridge and onto a newer bridge built downstream at the foot of Fourth Avenue. Following construction of the Fourth Avenue Bridge and the construction of Interstate 8 in the early 1970s, vehicular traffic and importance of the Ocean-to-Ocean Bridge steadily declined. Similarly, the historic transcontinental highway which the bridge had once carried, US 80, declined and was removed from San Diego to Benson between 1964 and 1977, no longer running through Yuma. In 1978, the bridge was added to the National Register of Historic Places. Despite the newly gained honor, vehicular traffic was no longer allowed to use the bridge after 1988. In 2001, a $3 million restoration and rehabilitation project was begun, temporarily closing the bridge to pedestrians as well. Following the extensive restoration and a re-dedication ceremony, the bridge was re-opened to traffic in 2002 and now carries Penitentiary Avenue. The Ocean-to-Ocean Bridge was designated as part of Historic U.S. Route 80 by the Arizona Department of Transportation on September 21, 2018.

== See also ==
- List of historic properties in Yuma, Arizona
- List of bridges on the National Register of Historic Places in Arizona
- National Register of Historic Places listings in Yuma County, Arizona
- Gillespie Dam Bridge
