= Copper Mountains =

Landform in Yuma County, Arizona

Highest point
- Peak: Coyote Peak
- Elevation: 2,808 ft (856 m)

Dimensions
- Length: 8 mi (13 km)

Geography
- Country: United States
- State: Arizona
- Range coordinates: 32°29′12″N 113°59′00″W

The Copper Mountains is a minor north–south trending mountain range, only 8 miles long in southwestern Arizona in the southwestern Sonoran Desert.

The Copper Mountains lie east of Yuma, Arizona and east of the Yuma Desert; also east of the Gila and Tinajas Altas Mountains. It lies on an extensive north-sloping desert plain that drains into the Gila River floodplain close to its confluence and outlet into the southern Colorado River in the Lower Colorado River Valley. The Lechuguilla Desert and Coyote Wash lie west of the mountains; the Tule Desert lies east. The highest point is Coyote Peak at 2,808 feet (856 m).

The communities just north at about 10 miles in the Gila River agricultural valley, are Wellton, Noah, Roll, and Tacna, Arizona.

The Copper Mountains lie in the western portion of the Barry M. Goldwater Air Force Range which is used by the MCAS, the Marine Corps Air Station, Yuma; also 3 miles north of the western end of the Cabeza Prieta National Wildlife Refuge.

== See also ==
- Valley and range sequence-Southern Yuma County
- List of mountain ranges of Yuma County, Arizona
- List of mountain ranges of Arizona
- List of LCRV Wilderness Areas (Colorado River)
