= List of North American deserts =

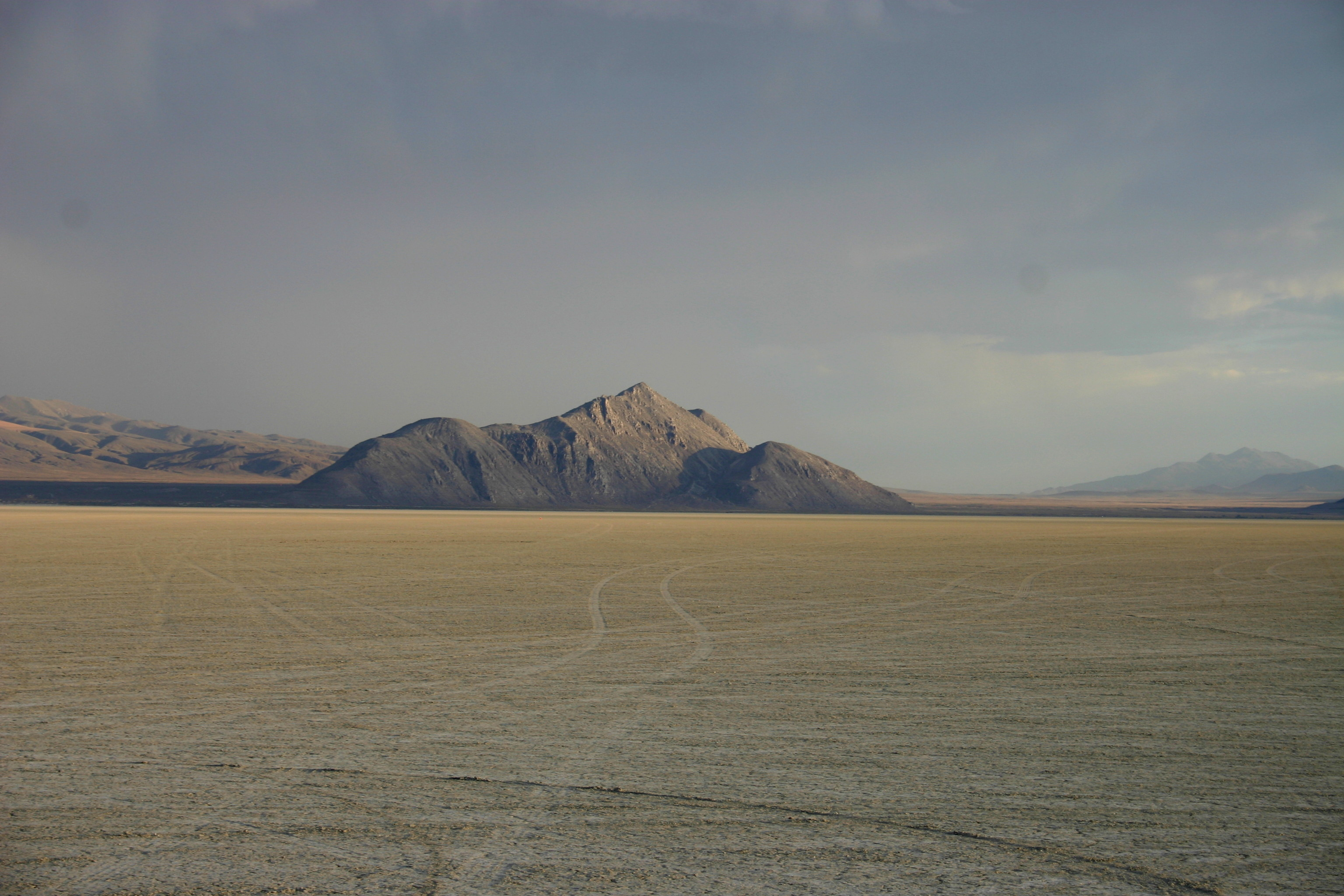
Black Rock Desert, northwest Nevada, a dry lake in the Great Basin Desert

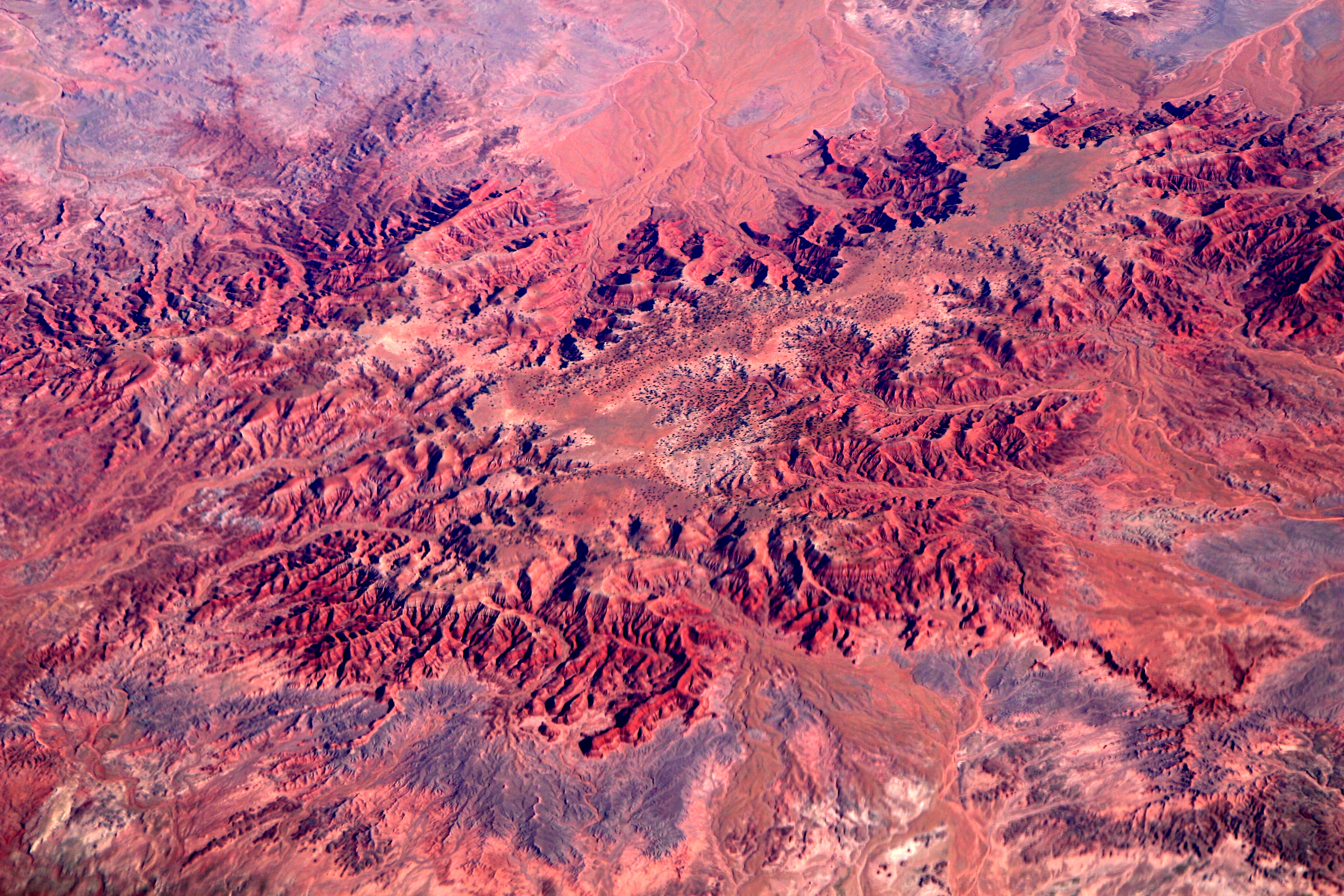
Aerial photo of the Painted Desert in Petrified Forest National Park, Arizona

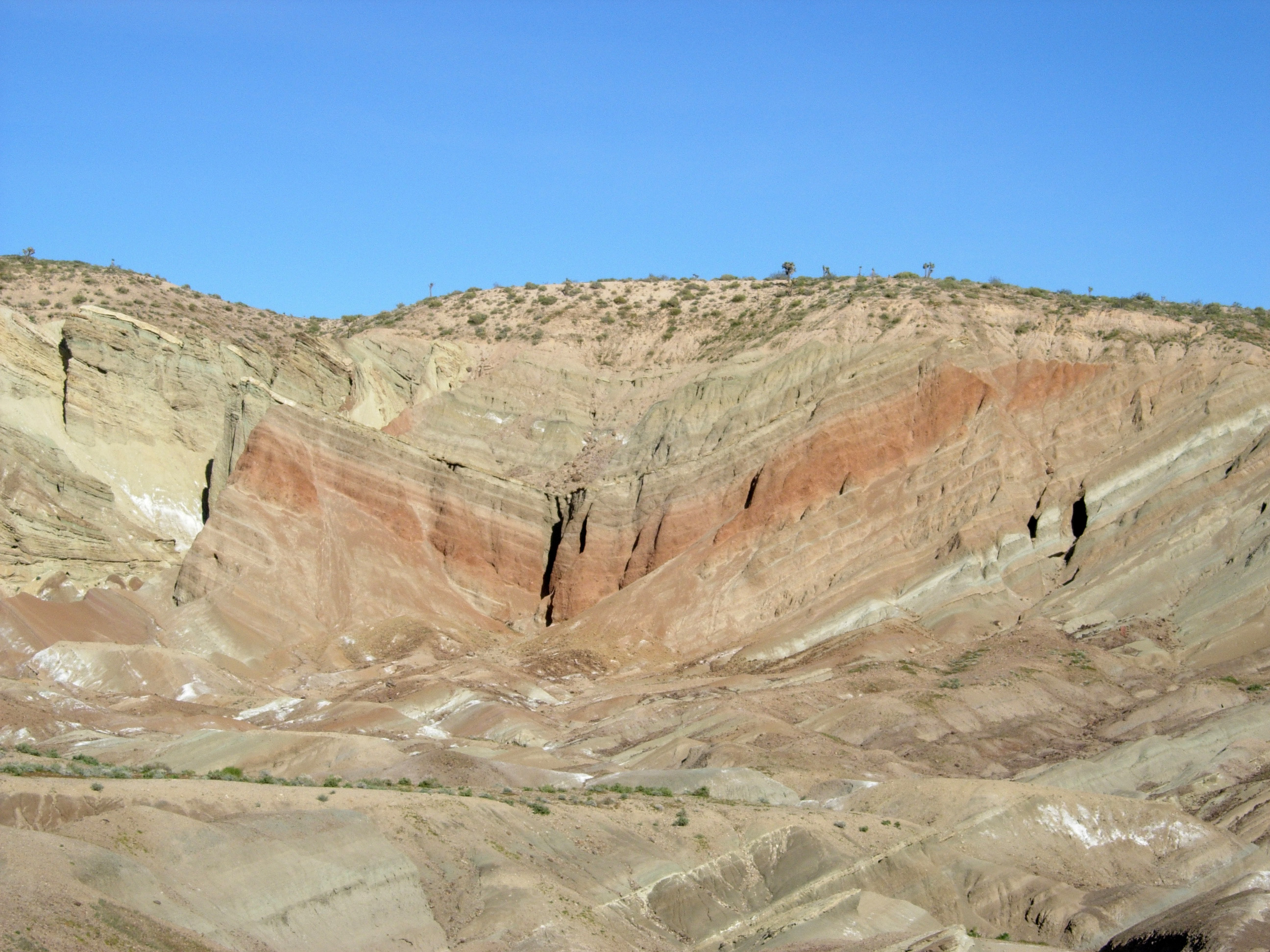
A geological syncline in the Mojave Desert near Barstow, California

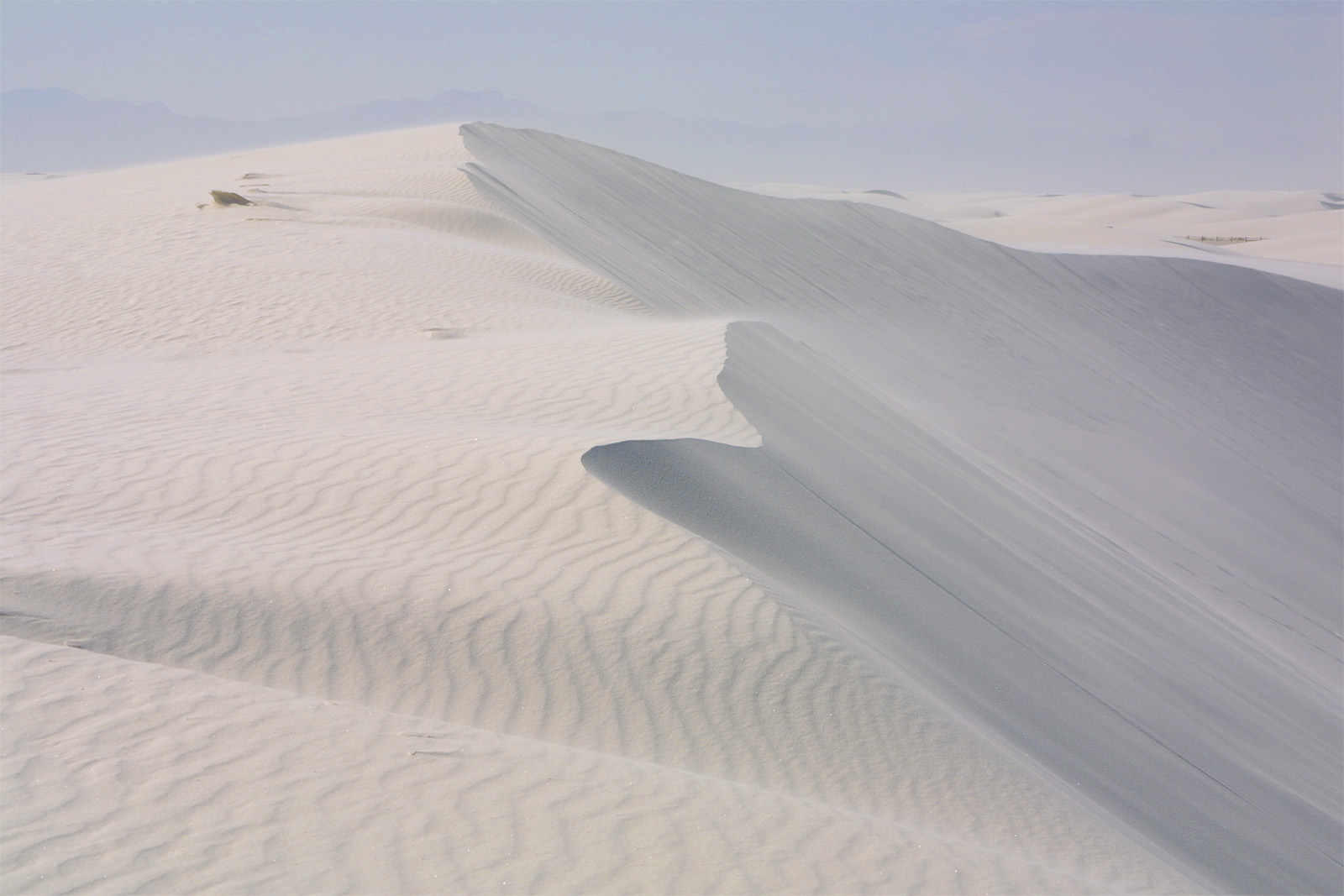
Unusual gypsum dunes at White Sands National Park in the Chihuahuan Desert

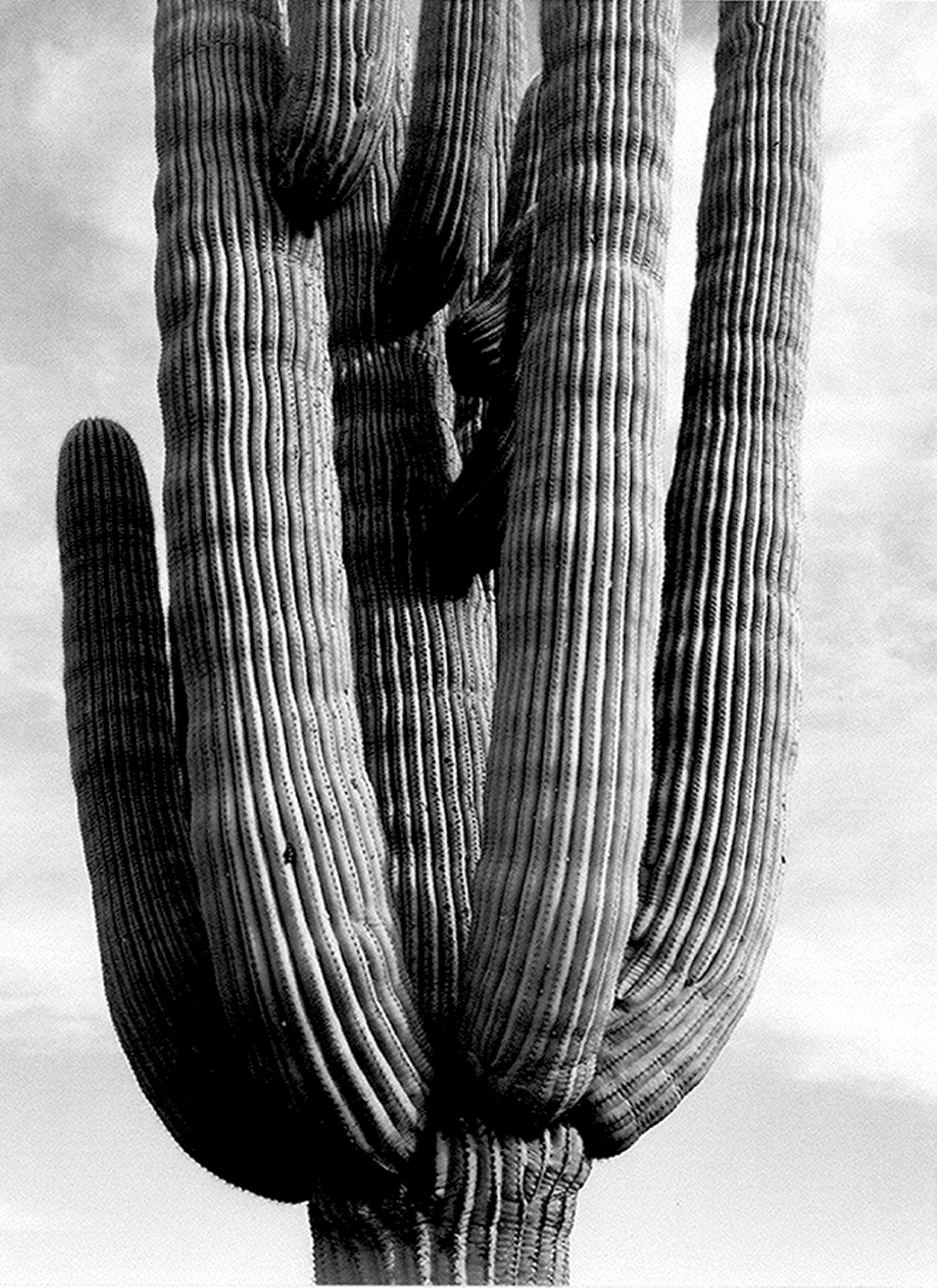
Saguaro (detail) of the Sonoran Desert. Photo by Ansel Adams, c.1941

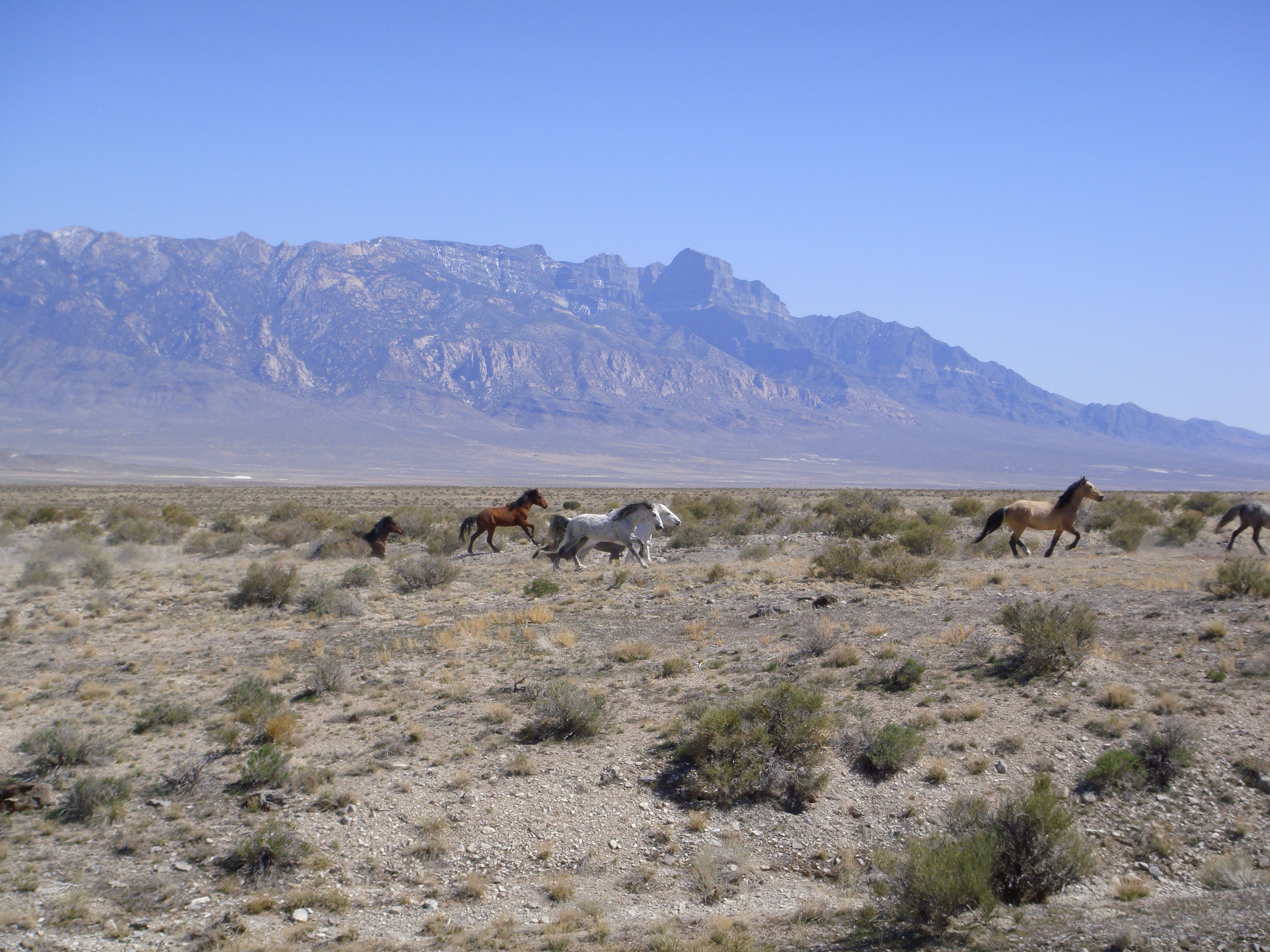
Mustangs run across a Sagebrush steppe, Tule Valley, Utah

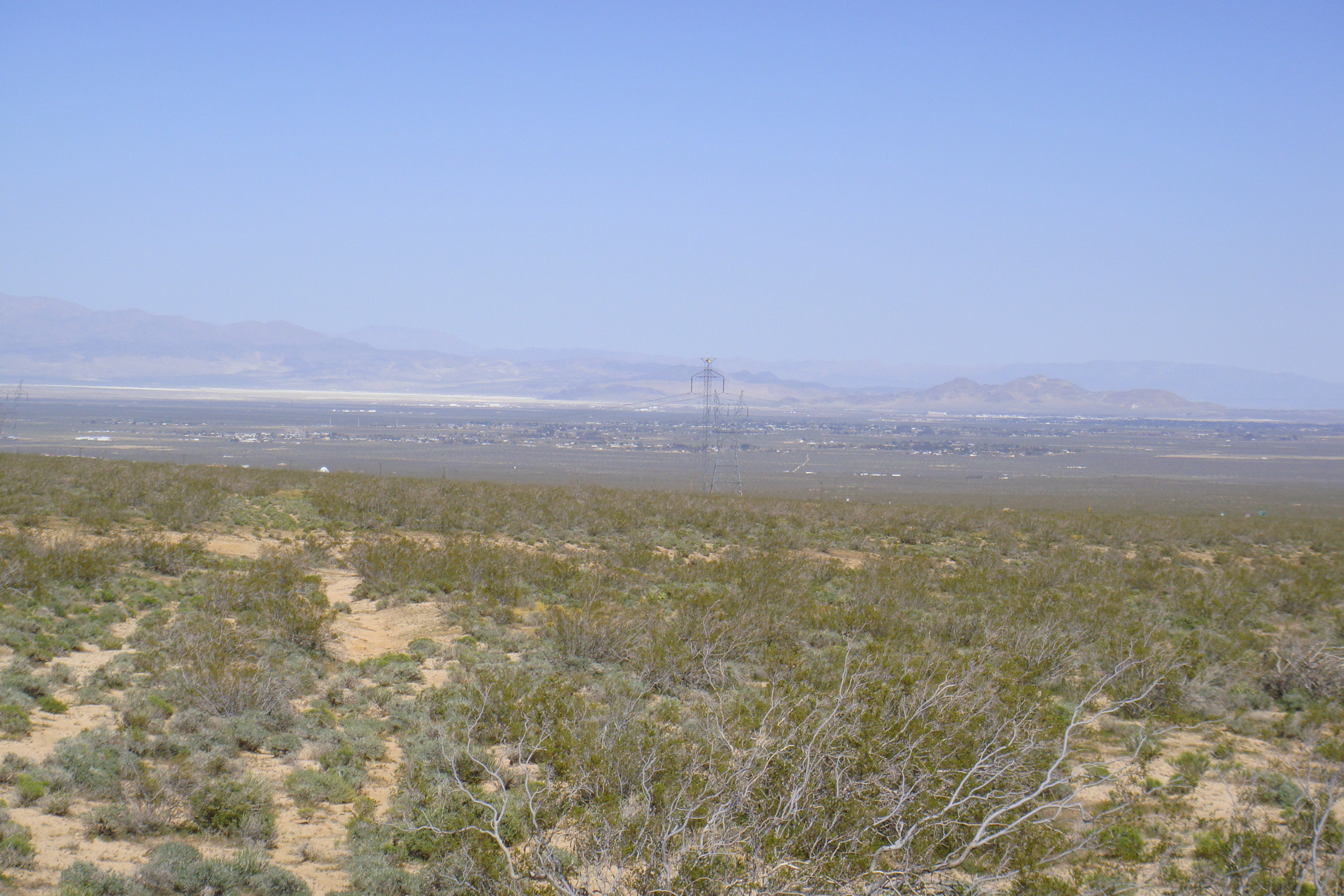
View of Indian Wells Valley, part of the Mojave (high) desert near Ridgecrest, California

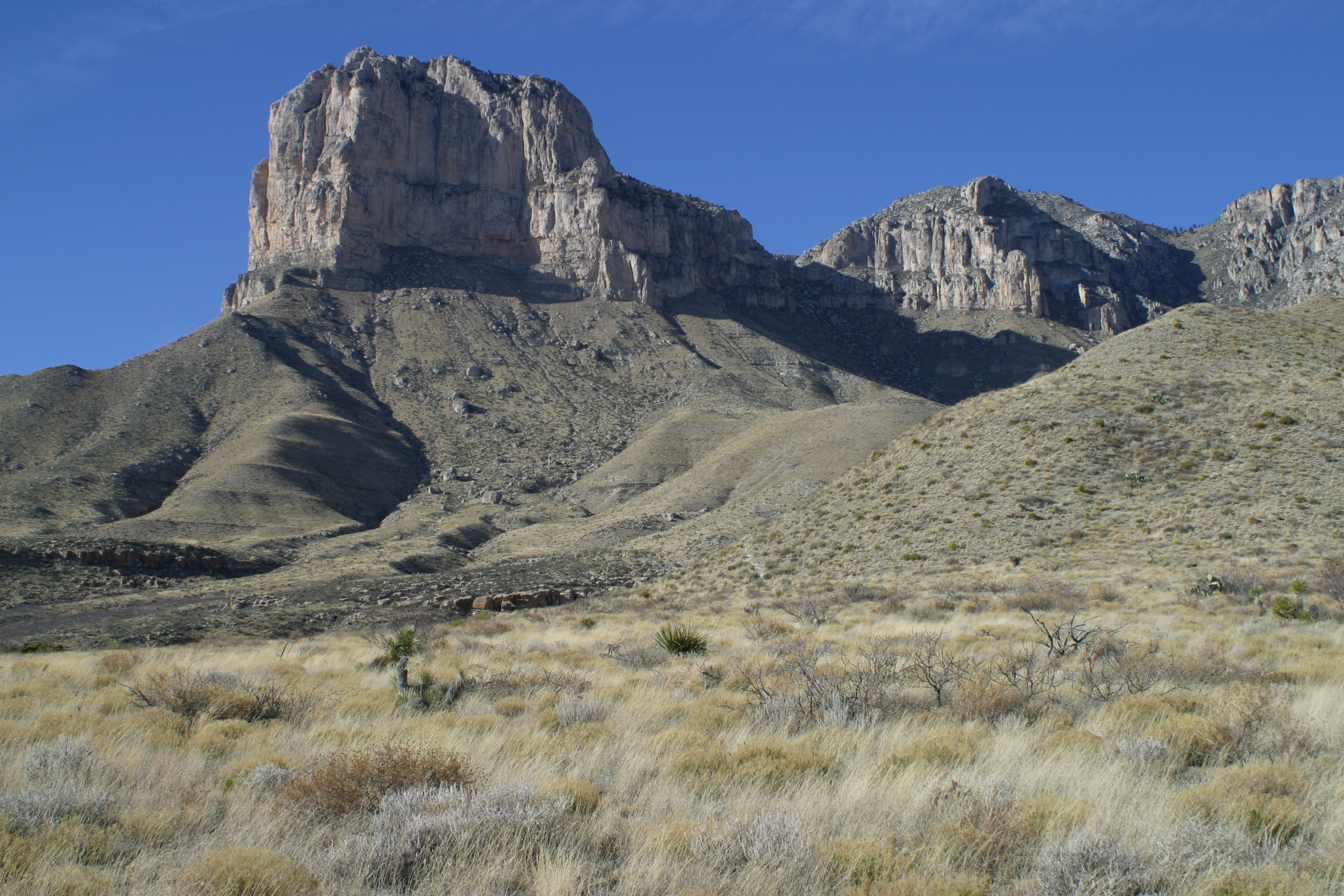
Guadalupe Mountains in Texas 2006

This list of North American deserts identifies areas of the continent that receive less than 10 in (250 mm) annual precipitation. The "North American Desert" is also the term for a large U.S. Level 1 ecoregion (EPA) of the North American Cordillera, in the deserts and xeric shrublands biome (WWF). The continent's deserts are largely between the Rocky Mountains and Sierra Madre Oriental on the east, and the rain shadow–creating Cascades, Sierra Nevada, Transverse, and Peninsular Ranges on the west. The North American xeric region of over 95,751 sq mi (247,990 km^{2}) includes three major deserts, numerous smaller deserts, and large non-desert arid regions in the Western United States and in northeastern, central, and northwestern Mexico.

== Overview ==
The following are three major hot and dry deserts in North America, all located in the Southwestern United States and Northern Mexico.

- The Chihuahuan Desert is the largest hot desert in North America, located in the Southwestern United States and Northern Mexico. Its total area is 140,000 sq mi (360,000 km^{2}).
- The Sonoran Desert is a desert located in the Southwestern United States and northwest Mexico. It is the second largest hot desert in North America. Its total area is 120,000 sq mi (310,000 km^{2}).
- The Mojave Desert is the hottest desert in North America, located primarily in southeastern California and Southern Nevada. Its total area is 22,000 sq mi (57,000 km^{2}).

The largest cold desert is the Great Basin Desert, which encompasses much of the northern Basin and Range Province, north of the Mojave Desert.

Other cold deserts lie within the Columbia Plateau/Columbia Basin, the Snake River Plain, and the Colorado Plateau regions.

== Desert ecoregions ==
Desert ecoregions of North America. Cold deserts: 1. Thompson-Okanagan Plateau; 2. Columbia Basin; 3. Northern Basin and Range; 4. Wyoming Basin; 5. Central Basin and Range; 6. Colorado Plateaus; 7. Arizona/New Mexico Plateau; 8. Snake River Plain; Hot deserts: 9. Mojave Basin and Range; 10. Sonoran Desert; 11. Baja Californian Desert; 12. Chihuahuan Desert

Listed from north to south, distinct North American desert regions include:

- Great Kobuk Sand Dunes three small deserts in northwestern Alaska, part of the Kobuk Valley National Park
- Yukon - Carcross Desert, smallest desert in the world
- Washington – British Columbia – Idaho – Wyoming – Oregon – Nevada
  - Much of the Columbia Basin is desert, such as the
    - Channeled Scablands, a desert in the Columbia Basin of eastern Washington
  - Most of the Snake River Plain (ecoregion) is sagebrush steppe, but barren lava fields form small deserts, such as
    - Craters of the Moon National Monument in Idaho
  - The Wyoming Basin (ecoregion) is dominated by arid grasslands and shrub steppe, but also contains the
    - Red Desert (Wyoming)
  - Owyhee Desert, in southwestern Idaho, northern Nevada, and southeastern Oregon.
    - Y P Desert, a portion of the Owyhee Desert in Idaho
  - Oregon High Desert, aka "Great Sandy Desert", eastern Oregon
    - Alvord Desert, a dry lake bed.
  - Northwest Lahontan subregion in Nevada-part of the Northern Basin and Range (ecoregion)
    - Black Rock Desert, a dry lake bed.
- Great Basin Desert
  - Nevada, dominated by sagebrush steppe
    - Forty Mile Desert, in northwest Nevada
    - Smoke Creek Desert, Nevada (980 sq mi)
    - Carson Desert
  - Utah
    - Great Salt Lake Desert, Utah
    - Sevier Desert surrounds the intermittent, salty Sevier Lake
      - Black Rock Desert volcanic field
    - Escalante Desert (3,270 sq mi)
- Colorado Plateau
  - Utah
    - San Rafael Desert, the drier portions of the San Rafael Swell
  - Colorado, dominated by pinyon–juniper woodlands, but contains desert areas where unfavorable soil conditions exist:
    - Bisti Badlands Desert, New Mexico
    - Painted Desert, Arizona
- Mojave Desert
  - California (the High Desert); and parts of western Arizona, southern Nevada, and a small portion of Utah.
    - Death Valley, California
  - Amargosa Desert, Nevada
- Sonoran Desert
  - Colorado Desert, Southern California (the Low Desert)
    - Yuha Desert, Imperial Valley, California
  - Yuma Desert, southwest Arizona
  - Lechuguilla Desert, southwest Arizona
  - Tule Desert (Arizona) and Sonora, Mexico
  - Gran Desierto de Altar, Sonora, Mexico
  - Baja California desert, State of Baja California, Mexico
    - Vizcaíno Desert, central State of Baja California, Mexico
- Chihuahuan Desert
  - Trans-Pecos Desert, west Texas
  - White Sands, unusual gypsum dune field in New Mexico

== Western arid regions of North America ==
The separately defined western arid regions of North America are continental regions of aridity based on available water in addition to rain shadow–diminished rainfall and which have many non-desert shrub-steppe (EPA) and xeric shrublands (WWF) in addition to desert ecosystems and ecoregions. This large arid region of 190,000 sq mi (490,000 km^{2}) includes: deserts, such as the Great Basin Desert and Sonoran Desert; and the non-desert arid region areas (with greater than 10 inches (250 mm) annual precipitation) in the Great Basin arid region, Colorado Plateau, Mexican Plateau, and others. This arid region extends from the top of the North American Desert in Washington and Idaho southward into Mexico in the Trans-Mexican Volcanic Belt. The 'western arid region' is east of and (except for Mojave sky islands) discontiguous from the Mojave Desert, unlike the southwestern Great Basin deserts adjacent with ecotones to the northern Mojave Desert.

== See also ==
- Desert ecology
- Deserts of California
- Great American Desert – Historical term for the High Plains region of North America
- List of deserts
- List of deserts by area
- North American Deserts in List of ecoregions in North America (CEC)
- North American Deserts in List of ecoregions in the United States (EPA)
- Semi-arid climate – Climate with precipitation below potential evapotranspiration
