= Sheep (disambiguation) =

Sheep (Ovis aries) are quadrupedal, ruminant mammals that are typically kept as livestock.

Sheep may also refer to:

== Animals ==
- Ovis, a genus including domestic sheep, bighorn sheep, Dall sheep, argali, and mouflon
- Sheep (meat), or lamb and mutton, the meat of domestic sheep
- Category:Sheep breeds

== Arts and entertainment ==
=== Fictional characters ===
- The Sheep, a character in Through the Looking-Glass by Lewis Carroll
- Sheep, a character in WordWorld
- The Sheep, characters from Animal Farm

=== Music ===
- Sheep (album) or the title song, by Zoë Lewis, 1998
- Sheep (EP), by Smile Empty Soul, 2019
- Sheep (mixtape), by Arca, 2015
- "Sheep" (The Housemartins song), 1986
- "Sheep" (Lay song), 2017
- "Sheep" (Pink Floyd song), 1977

=== Other media ===
- Sheep (novel), a 1994 novel by Simon Maginn
- Sheep (video game), a 2000 puzzle video game
- The Sheep (film), a 1920 Italian silent film
- Sheeep (animated series), a British children's animated television series
- "Sheep" (Barbara), a 2001 television episode

== Other uses ==
- SHEEP (symbolic computation system)
- Sheep (zodiac) or Goat, a sign of the Chinese zodiac
- Sheep, a term for unquestioningly obedient, naive, or innocent followers

== See also ==
- List of fictional sheep
- Aries (constellation), the sheep constellation
- Barbary sheep, a genus of rare or extinct ruminants
- Counting sheep
- Electric Sheep (disambiguation)
- Sheep Creek
- Sheep Island (disambiguation)
- Sheep Mountain (disambiguation)
- Sheep to shawl
- Sheeple
