= Tinajas Altas Mountains =

Landform in Yuma County, Arizona and Sonora, Mexico

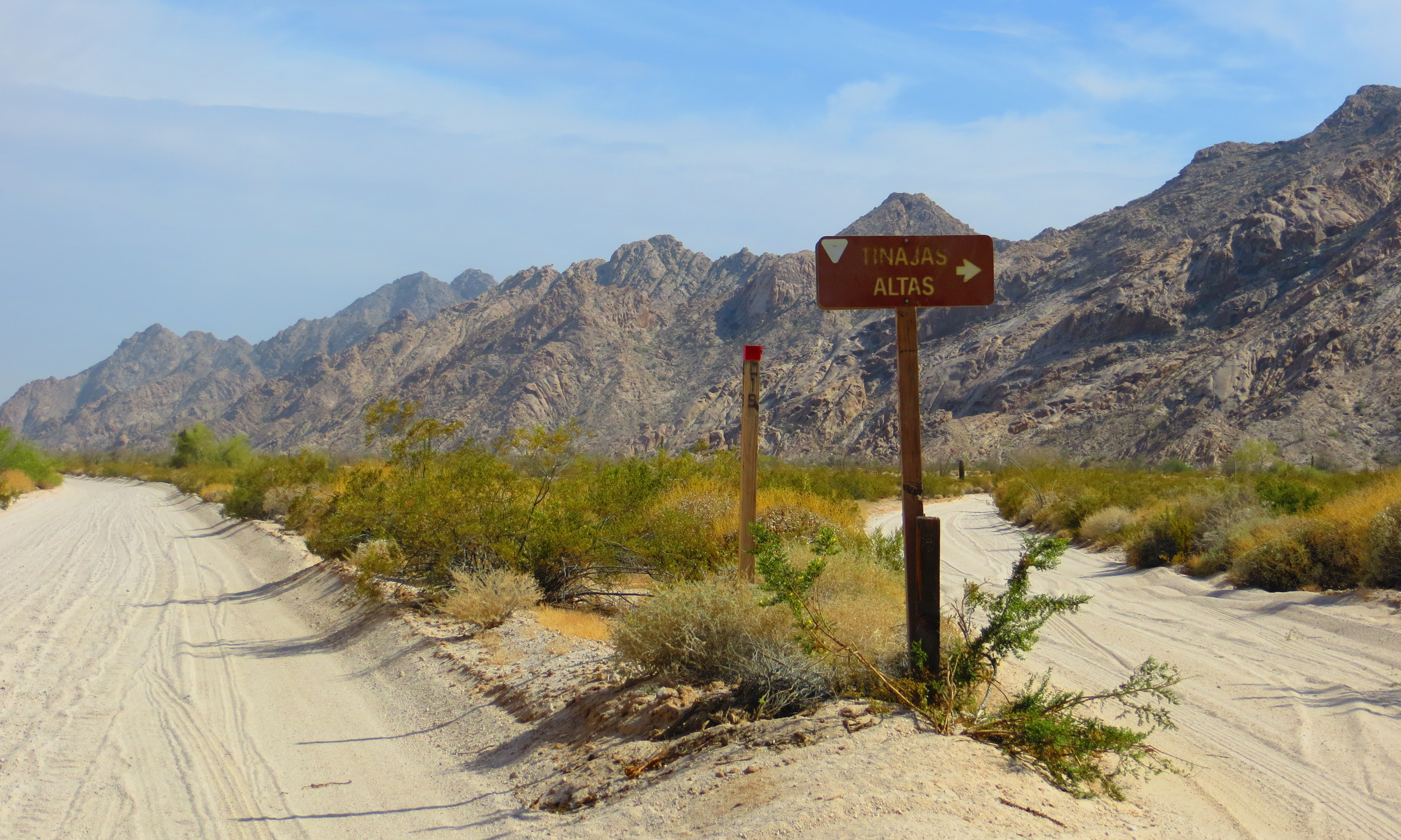
- Sign along El Camino Del Diablo in Barry M. Goldwater Air Force Range, near Wellton, Arizona, at spur road to Tinajas Altas.

Highest point
- Peak: Unnamed, 32°16′26″N 114°02′48″W
- Elevation: 843 m (2,766 ft)

Dimensions
- Length: 35 km (22 mi)
- Width: 6.4 km (4.0 mi)

Geography
- Location within Arizona
- Countries: United States and Mexico
- State: Arizona
- Regions: Sonoran Desert, Yuma Desert and Gran Desierto de Altar
- District: Yuma County, Arizona
- Settlement: Fortuna Foothills, Arizona
- Range coordinates: 32°17′00″N 114°03′00″W
- Borders on: Gila Mountains (Yuma County), Yuma Desert, Lechuguilla Desert and Gran Desierto de Altar

Geology
- Rock type: granite–(light-colored)

The Tinajas Altas Mountains are an extremely arid northwest–southeast trending mountain range in southern Yuma County, Arizona, approximately 35 mi southeast of Yuma, Arizona. The southern end of the range extends approximately one mile into the northwestern Mexican state of Sonora on the northern perimeter of the Gran Desierto de Altar. The range is about 22 mi in length and about 4 mi wide at its widest point. The highpoint of the range is unnamed and is 2,766 feet (843 meters) above sea level and is located at 32°16'26"N, 114°02'48"W (NAD 1983 datum). Aside from the portion of the range in Mexico, the entirety of the range lies within the Barry M. Goldwater Air Force Range. They lie at the heart of the traditional homeland of the Hia C-eḍ O'odham people.

== History ==
The range is named for the Tinajas Altas ("High Tanks"), which are a series of perched waterholes on the range's eastern side approximately four miles north of the international boundary. The waterholes figured prominently in the history of the area as they were for years the only reliable source of water for many miles. The Quechan, Cocopah, and Hia C-eḍ O'odham are known to have used the waterholes regularly. It was an important camp for the Hia C-eḍ O'odham, whose elders have described hundreds of people living there seasonally as recently as 1885. Indigenous people of the area lived mostly by hunting bighorn sheep and gathering desert plants such as Mesquite and Palo Verde. Indigenous art remains visible on the walls of Tinajas Altas Canyon, alongside remnants of day to day life such as bedrock metates, potsherds, and rock circles. Early Europeans reported seeing piles of sheep horns near the tanks, likely a result of Hia C-eḍ O'odham hunting traditions which involved cremating the bones of hunted sheep and ceremonially disposing of them away from camps, but none of these piles remain today.

Melchior Diaz and Eusebio Kino passed near Tinajas Altas in 1540 and 1699 respectively, and while it is uncertain if either one of them visited the tanks, one of the two was likely the first European to sight the range. Spaniards may have visited occasionally throughout the 18th century, but in 1781 Quechan people along the Colorado River rebelled against colonization, forcing the Spaniards to abandon their nearby route between Sonora and Alta California. Despite intermittent visits during the Mexican era of the early 19th century Europeans would not become a common presence at Tinajas Altas until the 1849 gold rush attracted thousands of new settlers to California. While many of these settlers followed a more northerly route along the Gila River, the threat of Apache raids sent others southwards along a network of indigenous trails which became known as the Camino del Diablo. Tinajas Altas was a well-established watering place along this route. That did not, however, make it a safe haven. Many reports from this period tell of travelers reaching the Tinajas too weak from thirst to climb to the water, including one famous, possibly apocryphal story of corpses found with their fingers worn to the bone from climbing to the higher tanks. The Tinajas were also a favorite ambush site for both Apache raiders and settler bandits. The abundance of corpses led to the creation of a makeshift cemetery on the flat at the entrance to Tinajas Altas Canyon which became known as the "Mesa of the Dead." Although no graves are visible in the modern day this name is still in common use and provides the premise for Robinson Jeffers' poem "The Dead Men's Child."

As the gold rush was tapering off in the early 1850s, Joaquin Murrieta was known to stop regularly at Tinajas Altas. Following the Gadsden Purchase of 1854 the range was absorbed by the United States, and the surveying commission for the new border watered at the tanks in 1855. Traffic on the Camino declined steeply following the completion of the Southern Pacific Railroad in 1877, although Tinajas Altas still saw prominent visits from Raphael Pumpelly, Carl Lumholtz, Kermit Roosevelt, and at least one party of Mexican Revolutionaries in the late 19th and early 20th centuries. Most visitors to Tinajas Altas over the past century, however, have been researchers or tourists drawn to the site's unique history and ecology. Since 1941 the site has been included in the Barry M. Goldwater Bombing Range and used for training of troops from Marine Corps Air Station Yuma. Despite this, no military activities occur in the immediate vicinity of Tinajas Altas, and the area remains open to the public. In recent years Prevention Through Deterrence policies have pushed immigrants further into remote areas of the range, and the Camino del Diablo, including the Tinajas Altas range, has once again become a perilous route for migrants on foot.

== Geology and geography ==
Geologically, the Tinajas Altas Mountains are a southeastward extension of the block faulted Gila Mountains, and what are now the Tinajas Altas Mountains were actually considered part of the Gila Mountains until about the middle of the 20th century. The two ranges are separated by Cipriano Pass, also referred to as "Smugglers Pass," about two miles northwest of Raven Butte, 2,694 feet (821 m) which is a notable dark-colored volcanic feature on the eastern flank of the otherwise light-colored granitic range.

The range lies in the Lower Colorado subdivision of the Sonoran Desert. This subdivision is sometimes referred to as the Colorado Desert and encompasses much of southeastern California, southwestern Arizona, northwestern Sonora, and northeastern Baja California. The subdivision is characterized by minimal precipitation, and the area around the Tinajas Altas Mountains averages only about three inches of rainfall per year.

Mexican topographic maps and United States Geological Survey (USGS) maps of the region disagree on the name of an adjacent range lying to the southeast of the Tinajas Altas Mountains. In the United States this small range is referred to as the Sierra de la Lechuguilla, but in Mexico they are called the Sierra Tinajas Altas which would suggest that they are a longer extension of the Tinajas Altas Mountains into Mexico. The two ranges, however, share no surface connection so they are not the same. The Sierra de la Lechuguilla/Sierra Tinajas Altas range are instead on a parallel alignment to the southeast of the Tinajas Altas Mountains proper.

The closest community to the Tinajas Altas Mountains is Fortuna Foothills in the east of the Yuma Valley adjacent to the Gila Mountains.

== Ecology ==
The Tinajas Altas Mountains exhibit a variety of flora and fauna species. Among the notable flora present is the elephant tree, (Bursera microphylla), which species exhibits a contorted multi-furcate architecture.

== See also ==
- Cabeza Prieta Mountains
- El Pinacate y Gran Desierto de Altar Biosphere Reserve
- Lechuguilla Desert
- List of LCRV Wilderness Areas (Colorado River)
- List of mountain ranges of Arizona
- List of mountain ranges of Yuma County, Arizona
- Pinacate Peaks
- Sierra Pinta
- Tinajas Altas (High Tanks)
- Tule Desert (Arizona)
- Valley and range sequence-Southern Yuma County
- Yuma Desert
