= Sheep Mountain =

Sheep Mountain may refer to:

== In the United States ==
(The Geographic Names Information System (GNIS) lists at least 160 mountains with Sheep Mountain as its full or partial name)

- Sheep Mountain (Alaska), in the Talkeetna Mountains
- Sheep Mountain (Kenai Mountains), in Alaska
- Sheep Mountain (Arizona) is the tallest peak in the Gila Mountains, Yuma County, Arizona (3,156 feet (962 m))
- Sheep Mountain (Colorado), summit in Rabbit Ears Range
- Sheep Mountain (San Juan County, Colorado), in the San Juan Mountains
- Sheep Mountain (San Miguel and Dolores Counties, Colorado), in the San Juan Mountains
- Sheep Mountain (Idaho)
- Sheep Mountain (Beaverhead County, Montana) (9,688 feet (2,953 m))
- Sheep Mountain (Carbon County, Montana) in Carbon County, Montana
- Sheep Mountain (Carter County, Montana) in Carter County, Montana
- Sheep Mountain (Flathead County, Montana) (8,530 feet (2,600 m)) in the Lewis Range, Glacier National Park, Montana
- Sheep Mountain (Jefferson County, Montana) in Jefferson County, Montana
- Sheep Mountain (Judith Basin County, Montana) in Judith Basin County, Montana
- Sheep Mountain (Lake County, Montana) in Lake County, Montana
- Sheep Mountain (Madison County, Montana) (10,321 feet (3,146 m)) in the Gallatin Range, Montana
- Sheep Mountain (Meagher County, Montana) in Meagher County, Montana
- Sheep Mountain in Mineral County, Montana
- Sheep Mountain (Missoula County, Montana) in Missoula County, Montana
- Sheep Mountain (Park County, Montana) in the Absaroka Range, Montana
- Sheep Mountain (Beartooth Mountains)
- Sheep Mountain (Gallatin Range, Montana)
- Sheep Mountain (Nye County, Nevada)
- Sheep Mountain (Snohomish County, Washington) (6,166 feet (1,879 m))
- Sheep Mountain (Teton County, Wyoming) (11,239 feet (3,426 m)) in the Gros Ventre Range, Wyoming

== In Canada ==
- Sheep Mountain (Yukon), in Kluane National Park
