= Gila River Valley =

Valley in Arizona, United States of America

Gila Valley
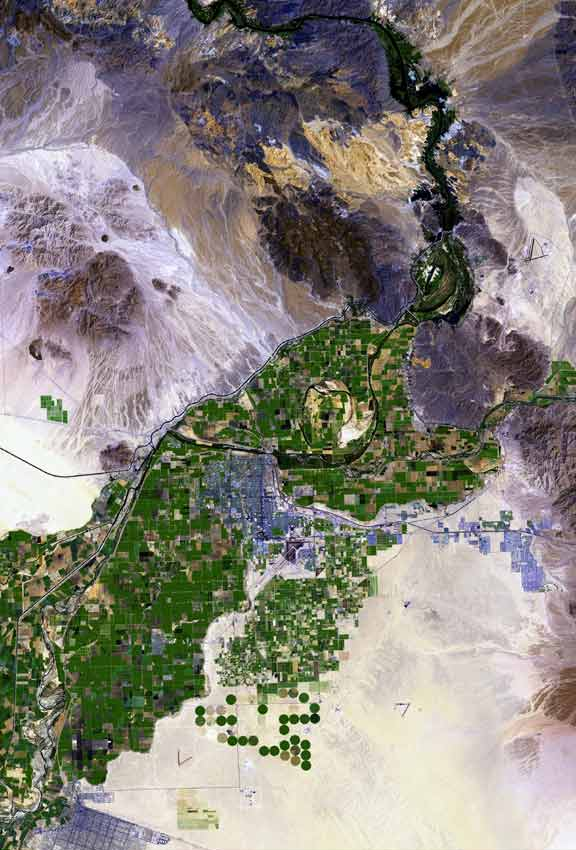
- The Gila valley in Yuma County

- Location within Arizona
- Length: 310 mi (500 km) E-W
- Width: 14 mi (23 km) N-S

Geography
- Country: United States
- State: Arizona
- Counties: List: Graham; Pinal; Gila; Pinal; Maricopa; Yuma
- Cities and towns: List: Safford; Winkelman; Florence; Buckeye; Yuma
- Coordinates: 33°4′47″N 111°39′20″W
- River: Gila River
- Interactive map of Gila Valley

The Gila River Valley is a multi-sectioned valley of the Gila River, located primarily in Arizona. The Gila River forms in western New Mexico and flows west across southeastern, south-central, and southwestern Arizona; it changes directions as it progresses across the state, and defines specific areas and valleys. The central portion of the river flows through the southern Phoenix valley region (the Salt River Valley joins the Gila River Valley in this area), and the final sections in southwestern Arizona form smaller, irrigated valleys, such as Dome Valley, Mohawk Valley, and Hyder Valley.

Two mountain ranges are named for the Gila River: the Gila Mountains (Graham County) bordering the Gila River Valley, northeast of Safford; the Gila Mountains (Yuma County) border the Gila River Valley before the Gila River joins its confluence with the Colorado River; that range is east of Yuma and the Fortuna Foothills.

== Graham County ==
The Gila Valley begins as a 35-mile (56 km) long valley in central Graham County, Arizona. Thatcher and Safford lie upstream on the Gila River in the southeast beginning of the valley. The elevation of the river valley upstream at Safford is 2,906 feet (886 m). The Gila Valley region along the river contains the most populated areas of the Safford micropolitan area.

== Yuma County ==
The Gila Valley of Yuma County, Arizona is a small valley surrounding the Gila River at its confluence with the Colorado River, the Colorado being the border between California and Arizona, and locally southwest of Yuma – Baja California, and Sonora states, Mexico.

The valley extends only 10 miles (16 km) from its confluence to the northern end of the Gila Mountains, which abut the east end of the Laguna Mountains, where the Gila River meanders west, southwest, then due west again.

The Gila Valley is called the North Gila Valley in the northern parts, north of the Gila River, and it is called the South Gila Valley in the south. The communities in the valley are agricultural, especially in the south and southwest, towards Yuma, Arizona.

The South Gila Valley borders the Yuma Mesa on its south, where the Fortuna Foothills are located on the northwest perimeter of the Gila Mountains.

The North Gila Valley contains the Adair Range, a shooting range located on the southern edge of the Laguna Mountains.

== History ==
=== Early inhabitants ===
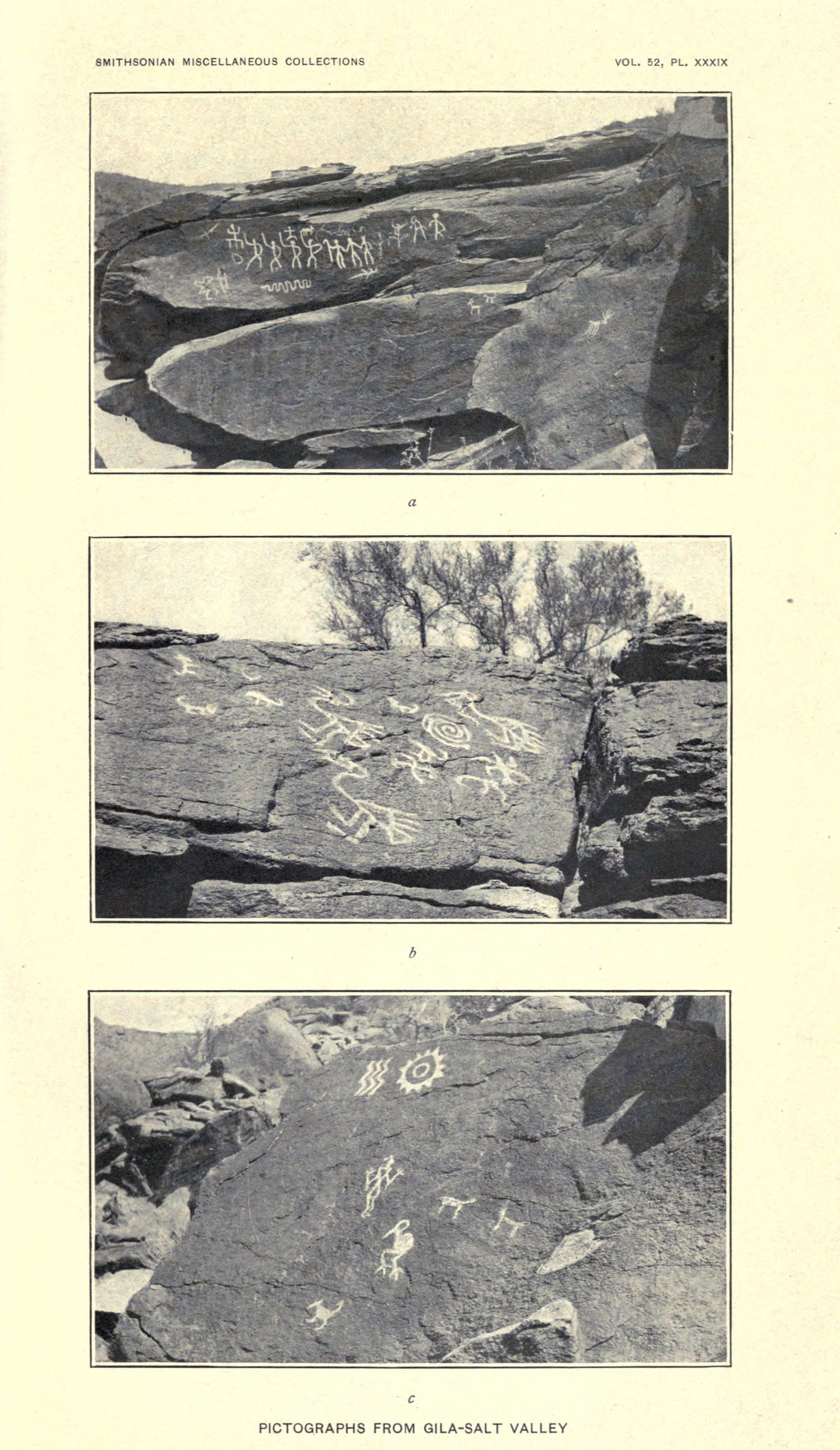
Prehistoric ruins in the Gila Valley

The Huhugam people migrated to the Gila River Valley around 300 BCE. They constructed over 500 miles of canals and were able to farm and conduct trade along the river. It is estimated that around 50,000–60,000 Huhugam people populated the Gila River Valley at the height of their "Classic Period" (around 1150–1450 CE). The Huhugam are considered the ancestors of the Akimel O’odham or Pima people. Around 1450 CE, nomadic Apache people arrived in the Gila Valley and Huhugam urban centers were abandoned. The Apache continued to raid the Akimel O’odham with even more success after the introduction of horses into the area. An Apache assault in 1780 led to the death or capture of 120 Akimel O’odham.

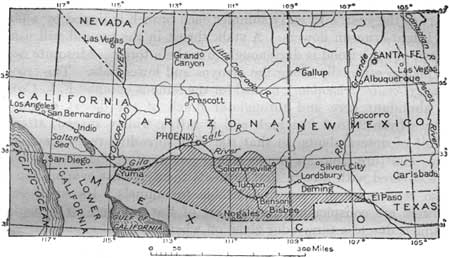
Gadsden Purchase map

The Akimel O’odham were able to thrive in the midst of the desert by cultivating crops along the Gila River. When the Piipaash (or Maricopa) tribe was driven out from the Yuman tribal people in the 1840s, they found refuge along the Gila River with the Akimel O’odham. After the Gadsden Purchase in 1853 incorporated the Gila Valley into the new Arizona Territory, an Indian Reservation was created along the Gila River in 1859. As of 1939, the Akimel O’odham and Maricopa people are a part of the Gila River Indian Community today.

=== Exploration and settling ===
==== Exploration ====
The southernmost portion Arizona was purchased by the United States government from Mexico in 1853 as part of the Gadsden Purchase. President Franklin Pierce commanded soldiers posted near the newly acquired land to determine the new boundaries of the Arizona Territory. General James Henry Carleton led a handful of soldiers on this surveying expedition. During the expedition in Graham Country, General Carleton took note of a tactical location offering a wide open view of the Gila Valley where he would later establish Fort Goodwin. In addition, scouts from railroad companies explored the Gila River Valley looking for a potential railroad route across the newly bought land. It was not until early 1878 that the first group of Mormon scouts from Northern Arizona entered the Gila Valley with the intent to settle. The Mormon scouts returned to the Gila River Valley for a second time in 1879.

==== First pioneers ====
Joseph K. Rodgers, alongside a small group of Mormon pioneers, settled Smithville in 1879 after receiving positive reports from Mormon scouts sent to the area earlier in the same year. The settlers quickly dug irrigation ditches along the banks of the Gila river and planted crops in the fertile soil.

The news of fertile land quickly spread to other Mormon settlements throughout Arizona and Utah. Between 1881 and 1884, many settler families moved to the Gila River Valley. During this time, the settlements of Curtis, Graham, Thatcher, Central, Layton, and McDonald were formed. The valley was transformed by a system of roads connecting churches, schools, and newsrooms throughout the valley. By 1885, the population of Pima (a settlement formerly known as Smithville) had grown to approximately 500 people.

==== Texan ranchers ====
Texan ranchers also began emigrating to the Gila Valley. The 1880s brought drought, livestock diseases, overgrazing, and conflicts between ranchers in Texas. The sixth territorial governor of Arizona, Frederick A. Tritle, recognized a growing number of ranchers from Texas moving with their herds to Arizona in search of better grazing land. New railway lines made migration of families and cattle across the south easier. One notable migrant into the Gila River Valley from Texas was Glenn Reynolds, who moved over 1,800 cattle on railway cars and later became the sheriff of Gila County. The emigration of ranchers from Texas to Arizona increased settlement populations and changed the dynamics of early communities in the Gila Valley.

==== Mormon settlers ====
The population of Graham Country increased sharply after various settlements spanning the Gila River Valley were founded. In 1883, many polygamist families fled to Southern Arizona and Mexico in order to escape federal prosecution and imprisonment under the new Edmunds Tucker Law, which banned the practice of polygamy in the United States and its territories. Many of these families settled in the Gila River Valley. This massive influx of people led general authorities of the Church of Jesus Christ of Latter-Day Saints to authorize the creation of the Saint Joseph stake, with President Christopher Layton serving as president.

A vast majority of the Mormon settlers primarily sustained themselves either by farming or working as freighters for the surrounding mines in Morenci and Clifton . These farmers dug 40 miles of new irrigation canals and added between 15 and 20 miles to the pre-existing canals. A small number of farmers living in Smithville banded together to create a co-op called the "Smithville Irrigation and Manufacturing Company", which established a mercantile headed by Hyrum Weech. In 1886, the construction of a railroad line to the mines in the Clifton and Morenci area brought an end to many freight lines as the railroad charged cheaper rates to transport goods. Because of this, many freighters began working for mines and businesses in the Globe area.

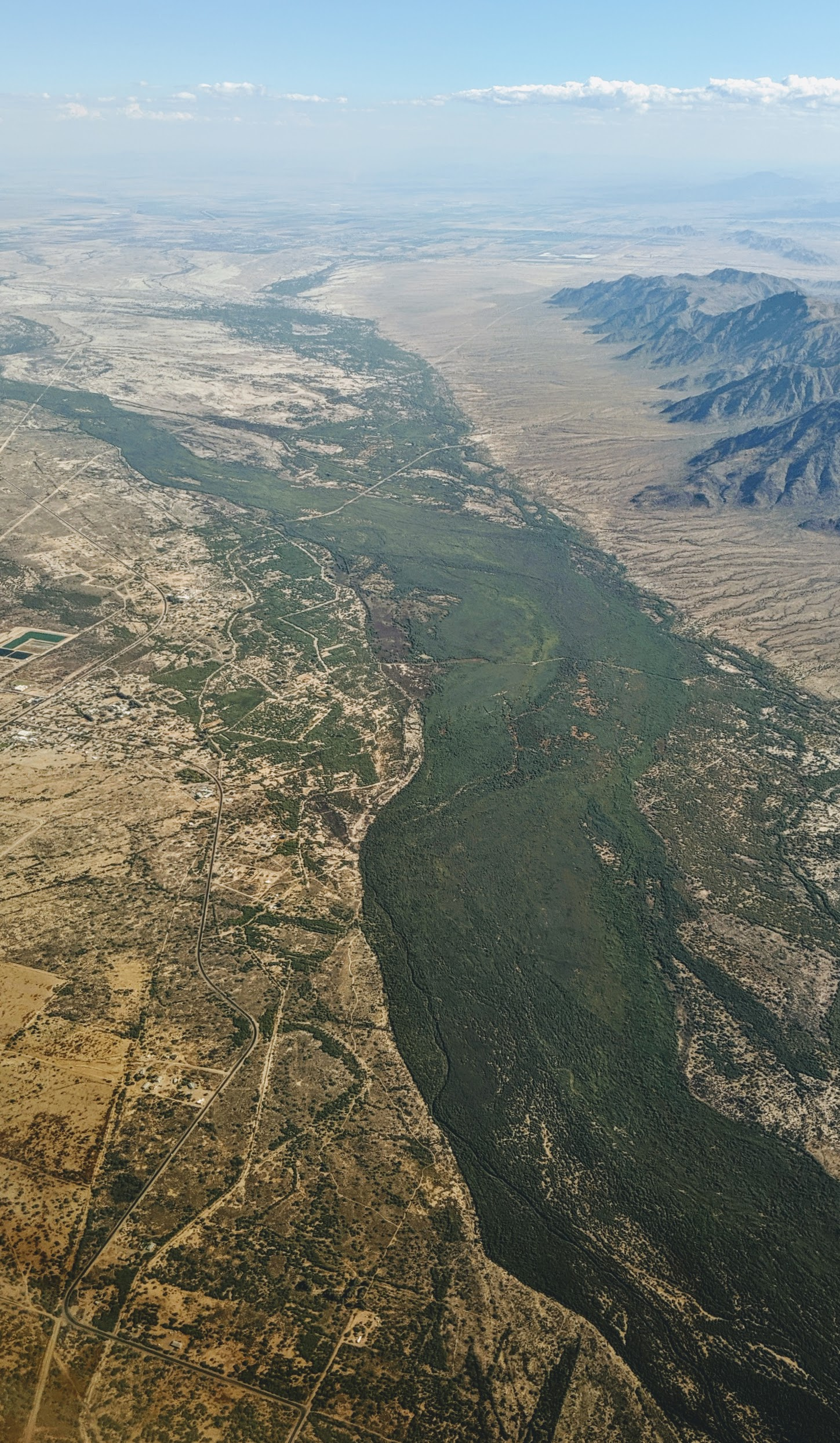
The Gila River creates an oasis of cottonwood and willow trees throughout the Arizona Desert.

A sawmill was built on nearby Mount Graham, along with a complicated network of flumes and cable tramways constructed to facilitate the transport of the wood down to the Gila River Valley. With access to lumber, settlers in the area began constructing buildings out of wood instead of adobe. During this time, the Saint Joseph Stake Academy was created. This school provided settler children the opportunity to be educated both spiritually and academically. The Saint Joseph Stake Academy was later renamed Eastern Arizona College, which is still in operation as a community college.

The Gila River Valley was advertised as a fertile land with temperate weather and long growing seasons. These attributes of the valley attracted many immigrants. Newly converted Mormons, especially from the Eastern United States and Europe, flocked to the Gila River Valley to claim land of their own.

The Southern Pacific Railroad established a line that ran through the Gila River Valley in 1895. The first telephone wires spanned through the valley in 1898. In 1900, the Bank of Safford was established and a flour mill was also opened.

===== Population of Mormons in the Gila River Valley between 1880 and 1900 =====
Year	1880	1882	1884	1885	1886	1887	1888	1889	1890	1891	1892	1893	1894	1895	1896	1897	1898	1899	1900
Population	148	416	836	1182	1388	1371	1489	1478	1538	1559	1933	2049	2198	2325	2397	2687	2920	3015	3170

As shown in the table above, the Mormon population living in the Gila River Valley increased greatly between 1880 and 1900.

=== Early conflicts ===
Between 1878 and 1883, there was confusion about where the border of the Gila Valley Indian Reservation was. A Mormon settlement called Forestdale was created in 1878, then vacated in 1880 when local Native Americans said the land was theirs. The Mormons returned in 1881 when rumors that the land was not part of the reservation had circulated, then abandoned it indefinitely when it was confirmed Forestdale was on the reservation lands. This debate over borders and boundaries was a point of contention for early settlers in the Gila Valley who did not have easy access to accurate maps.

When rumors of gold in the Gila River spread in the 1870s, Americans and Mexicans began mining in the valley. Clashes between Americans, Mexicans, and Native Americans broke out constantly. One notable conflict began in 1872. The murder of Mexican settler Francisco Gandara and subsequent outrage of the local Mexicans resulted in several fatal clashes and strains in the diplomatic relations between the United States and Mexico. Gandara was shot by a vigilante gang of white Americans who blamed him for the disappearance of William McFarland, though no evidence was found to implicate Gandara. This event sparked what some call the "race wars" or the "war on the Gila". Tensions between groups remained high for decades.

A water crisis was declared in the 1870s due to Mexican and American settlements diverting the waters of the Gila River. The new towns of Adamsville and Florence were built upstream from the Gila River Indian Reservation, leaving the Pima with little of the water they claimed as their legal right. Several canals were built to bring water to the towns that held the geographical advantage, leaving the Pima with insufficient water to continue to cultivate their crops. The situation worsened with the founding of the Mormon town of Safford and settlements in Solomonville, Duncan, Pima, and Thatcher—each of which required the construction of more canals. By 1871, the Pima had no summer crops. The reservation boundaries were expanded but water was still insufficient. Relations between the Pima and the American settlers became strained. The Pima called upon the US Army to intervene, and General Irvin McDowell brought the issue to President Rutherford B. Hayes’ attention. Hayes stopped the sale of public land along the Gila River and greatly extended the reservation with an executive order in 1879. The Arizonan government appealed to the president, who cut back on the reservation extension.

== Bibliography ==
- Bancroft, Hubert Howe. History of Arizona and New Mexico: 1530–1888. British Columbia: The History Company Publishers, 1889.
  - This peer reviewed source describes the motives and outcomes of Mormon settlers in the Gila Valley. The book focuses on the events that led to the formations of the settlements. In addition, the book mentions the activities and achievements of the Mormon settlers. The author also provides information of the size of the population in the various settlements across Graham County.
- DeJong, David H. None Excel Them in Virtue and Honesty: Ecclesiastical and Military Descriptions of the Gila River Pima, 1694–1848. Nebraska: University of Nebraska Press, 2005.
  - This peer reviewed source provides details on the Mormon Battalion in the Gila Valley. The text also describes the first Mormon Settlers who built their homes across the Gila Valley. This article sees the interactions of the settlers through the point of view of the Native Americans who originally lived in the Gila Valley.
- DeJong, David H. "Setting the Stage: Post–Civil War Expansion and Settlement in Central Arizona." In Diverting the Gila: The Pima Indians and the Florence-Casa Grande Project,1916–1928,18–40. University of Arizona Press, 2021.
  - This peer-reviewed source explores the fight for water from the Gila River between white settlers and Native Americans. This highlights the central role water rights played in the power struggle for the Gila Valley. President Grant sent a Brigadier General to find a solution to the water crisis. Newly founded settlements such as Adamsville and Florence were diverting the Gila River for irrigation purposes, leaving the Pima Reservation downstream with little water.
- Delong, Sydney R. The History of Arizona: To the Earliest Time Known to the People of Europe to 1903. San Francisco: The Whittaker & Ray Company, 1905.
  - This source gives a general overview of the various settlements found throughout the Gila Valley. The book also mentions the effects the Mormon settlers had on the economy and population of the county. The chapter specifically mentions the types of industries the settlers participated in and their agricultural work.
- Ellis, Catherine H. Arizona Has Been Good to Me: Routes and Recollections of Latter-Day Saint Settlement in Arizona. Tucson: Arizona Historical Society, 2013.
  - This source describes the routes the settlers coming from Northern Arizona took to access the Gila Valley. The author employs maps to show the most popular routes used during this time period. In addition, various stories of settlers of the Gila Valley are recounted. Original pictures of the settlers are also included in the source.
- Frontz, Kim. "Q RANCH: Lena Ellison's Photographs of Pioneer Life in Gila County, Arizona,1890s–1910." The Journal of Arizona History 43, no. 2 (2002): 153–172.
  - This source is from a peer-reviewed journal published by the Arizona Historical Society. It gives an account of several families who moved into the Gila Valley from Texas in search of more grazing land. One individual from this group of families, Glenn Reynolds, became the sheriff of Gila County (Sheriff Reynolds has a Wikipedia page). This source ties in the fact that it was not just Mormon settlers moving into this region.
- Miller, Henry E. The Life Story of Hyrum Oscar Crandall of Springville, Utah. Mesa, Arizona: FamilySearch International, 1994.
  - This published memoir was compiled by the children, grandchildren, and great-grandchildren of a Mormon (Hyrum Crandall) who attempted to flee Utah into Mexico to escape persecution for practicing polygamy. Hyrum left one of his wives in the Gila Valley (Safford). The area had already been settled at that time but this provides a first-hand account of how polygamy drove Mormons into this region of Arizona, contributing to a sudden population increase. This source is not peer-reviewed.
- Roberts, Virginia Culin. "Francisco Gandara and War on the Gila." The Journal of Arizona History 24, no. 3 (1983): 221–236. Accessed October 5, 2022.
  - This peer-reviewed article from the Arizona Historical Society narrates the "race wars" between American and Mexican settlers in the Arizona Territory, specifically along the Gila River. The author makes the claim that conflicts in the Gila Valley led to worsening relations between the United States and Mexico. Also included in this article is a hand-drawn map of the Gila Valley from Captain F. E. Grossman from the late 19th century.
- Smith, Andrea. "Mormon Forestdale." Journal of the Southwest 47, no. 2 (2005): 165–208.
  - This source is an academic and peer-reviewed article in a journal published quarterly. It explores the relationship between early Mormon settlers and Native Americans. One early Mormon settlement was started on a reservation, named Forest Dale. After a few years, the Mormons realized they were on a reservation and abandoned their settlement. The author gives a background on Latter-Day Saints in east-central Arizona, which provides a good basis for our article, including the Mormon's relations with the Native Americans in east-central Arizona.
- Teeples, C.A. The First Pioneer of the Gila Valley. Phoenix: Arizona State Historian, 1929.
  - This article shares the history surrounding William Teeple's action of settling in the Gila Valley in 1879. The story is told by a relative and includes detailed accounts of the journey to the Gila Valley. The author then describes the interactions William Teeple had with the other settlers and the environment in the Gila Valley.
- The Church of Jesus Christ of Latter-Day Saints in The Gila Valley. Salt Lake City: Church Newsroom, 2010.
  - This source describes how the Mormon Settlers changed the landscape and what they constructed. The author first describes where the settlers originated from. The article describes how the saints were very industrious and constructed canals to transport water and lumber. In addition, the establishment of Eastern Arizona College is mentioned.
- Williams, Oran Adna. "Settlement and Growth of the Gila Valley in Graham County as a Mormon Colony, 1879–1900." repository.arizona.edu. The University of Arizona, January 1, 1937.
  - This University of Arizona thesis explores the various factors contributing to the settlement of Graham County, Gila Valley. It focuses largely on the Mormon settlers that flooded into the area and tracks when the area began to have rapid growth. This source provides an important timeline and population numbers. As a master's program thesis, it is not a peer-reviewed source.
