= Barry M. Goldwater Air Force Range =

Bombing range in Arizona, United States

Barry M. Goldwater Range
- Part of Luke Air Force Base and Marine Corps Air Station Yuma
- Yuma County and Maricopa County, Arizona
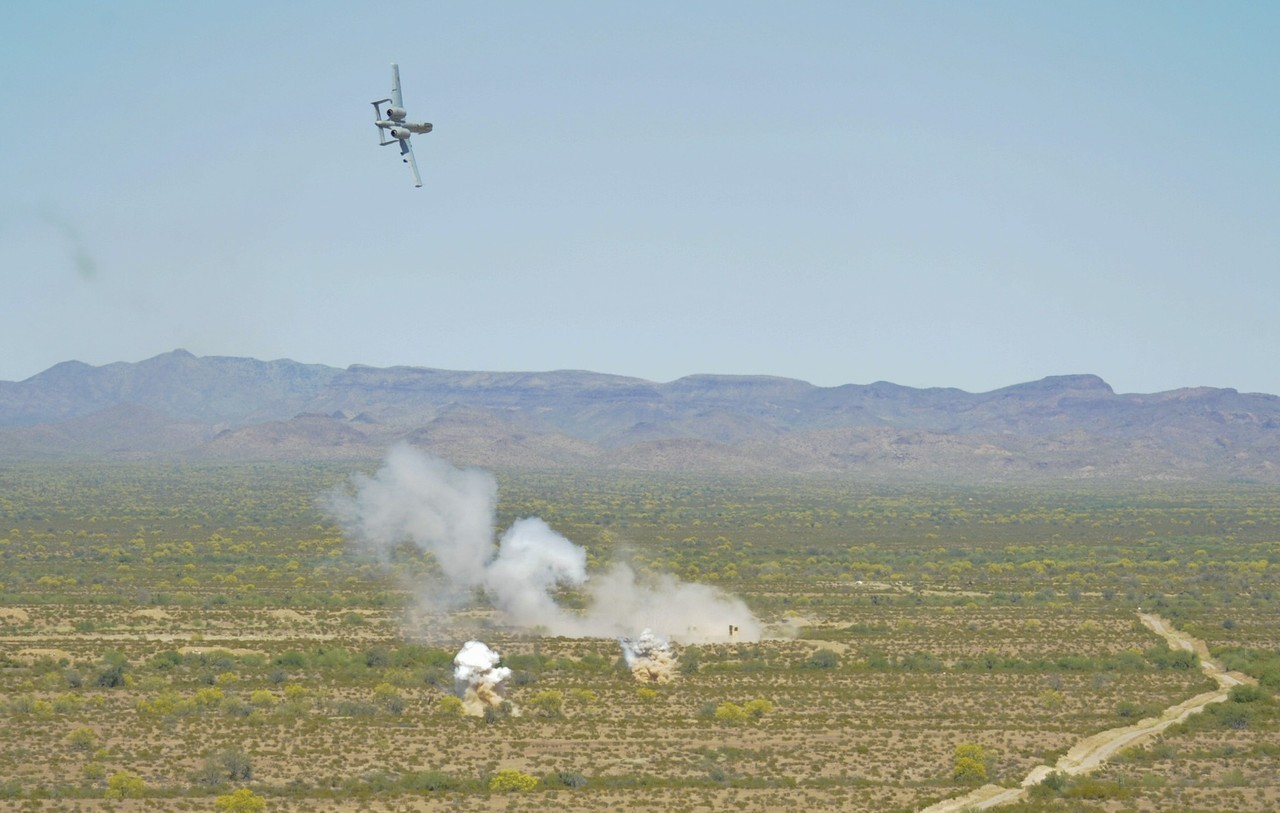
- An A-10C drops a BDU-33 on the Barry M. Goldwater Range.

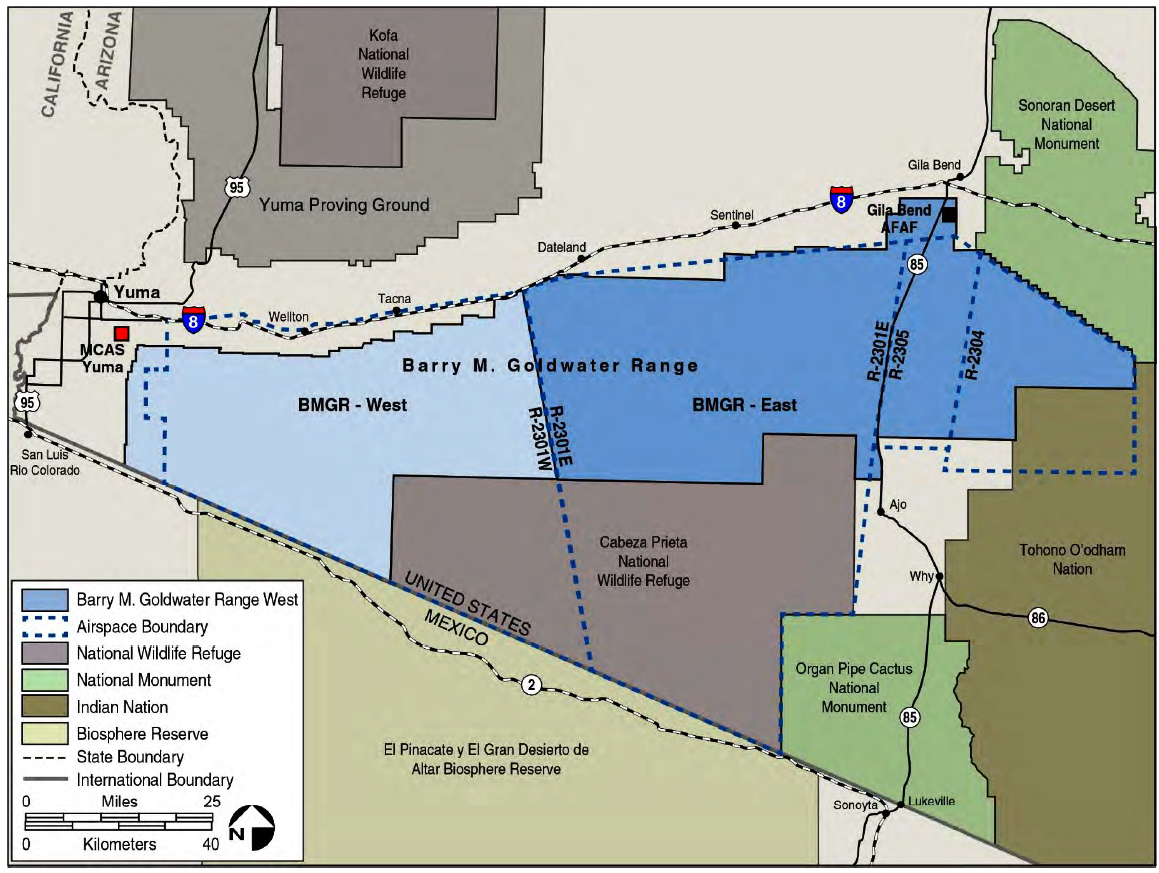
- Barry M. Goldwater Range Land Tenure Map

Site information
- Type: Bombing range
- Controlled by: United States Air Force; United States Marine Corps

Location
- Coordinates: 32.4625°N 113.44583333333°W

Site history
- In use: 1941 – present

The Barry M. Goldwater Air Force Range or Barry M. Goldwater Range (BMGR), formerly known as Luke Air Force Range, is a bombing range in the U.S. state of Arizona, between the Mexico–United States border and Interstate 8 straddling the Cabeza Prieta National Wildlife Refuge and the Tohono Oʼodham Nation.

== History and operations ==
Established in 1941, the BMGR is primarily used for air-to-ground bombing practice by United States Air Force (USAF) pilots flying A-10 Thunderbolts from Davis–Monthan Air Force Base, F-16 Fighting Falcons and F-35 Lightning IIs from Luke Air Force Base and Tucson Air National Guard Base, and United States Marine Corps pilots and naval flight officers in F/A-18 Hornets, AV-8B Harriers and F-35Bs flying from Marine Corps Air Station Yuma. It is also used by other U.S. and NATO/Allied/Coalition flight crews while deployed to any of the aforementioned bases for training. According to a USAF spokesman, "The Barry M. Goldwater range is between Phoenix, Tucson and Yuma... As you take that geography and look at the military in those three cities you have roughly 20 squadrons that use the range day in, day out as their backyard range. When you piece all of the airspace together, it’s actually bigger than the state of Connecticut which makes it a real training treasure.”

The entire range is approved for day and night operations with four controlled, manned, and electronically scored surface attack ranges that are available for training. There are three tactical ranges available spanning several hundred square miles each, and containing two full-size airfield mockups. The area includes the Gila Bend Air Force Auxiliary Field which serves as an emergency landing location for pilots and flight crews training on the ranges.

Map of the western half of the BMGR

The USAF operates the eastern portion of the BMGR while the U.S. Marine Corps operates the western portion.

The range was named after five-term U.S. Senator, Barry M. Goldwater from Arizona. Goldwater received a reserve commission in the U.S. Army Air Forces when the United States entered World War II. Following the war, Goldwater was a leading proponent of creating the U.S. Air Force Academy. As a colonel, he also founded the Arizona Air National Guard and eventually retired as a command pilot with the rank of major general. By the end of his career, he had flown 165 different types of aircraft.

== Geography ==
The BMGR includes part of the Yuma Desert and Gila Mountains, almost all of the Tinajas Altas Mountains and the Lechuguilla Desert, all of the Copper Mountains, much of the Mohawk Valley, part of the Mohawk Mountains, San Cristobal Valley and Granite Mountains, most of the Childs Valley, and part of the Growler Valley.

El Camino del Diablo, which historically connected Yuma, Arizona, and Sonoita, Mexico, runs through the BMGR.

== Undocumented immigrants crossing the BMGR ==
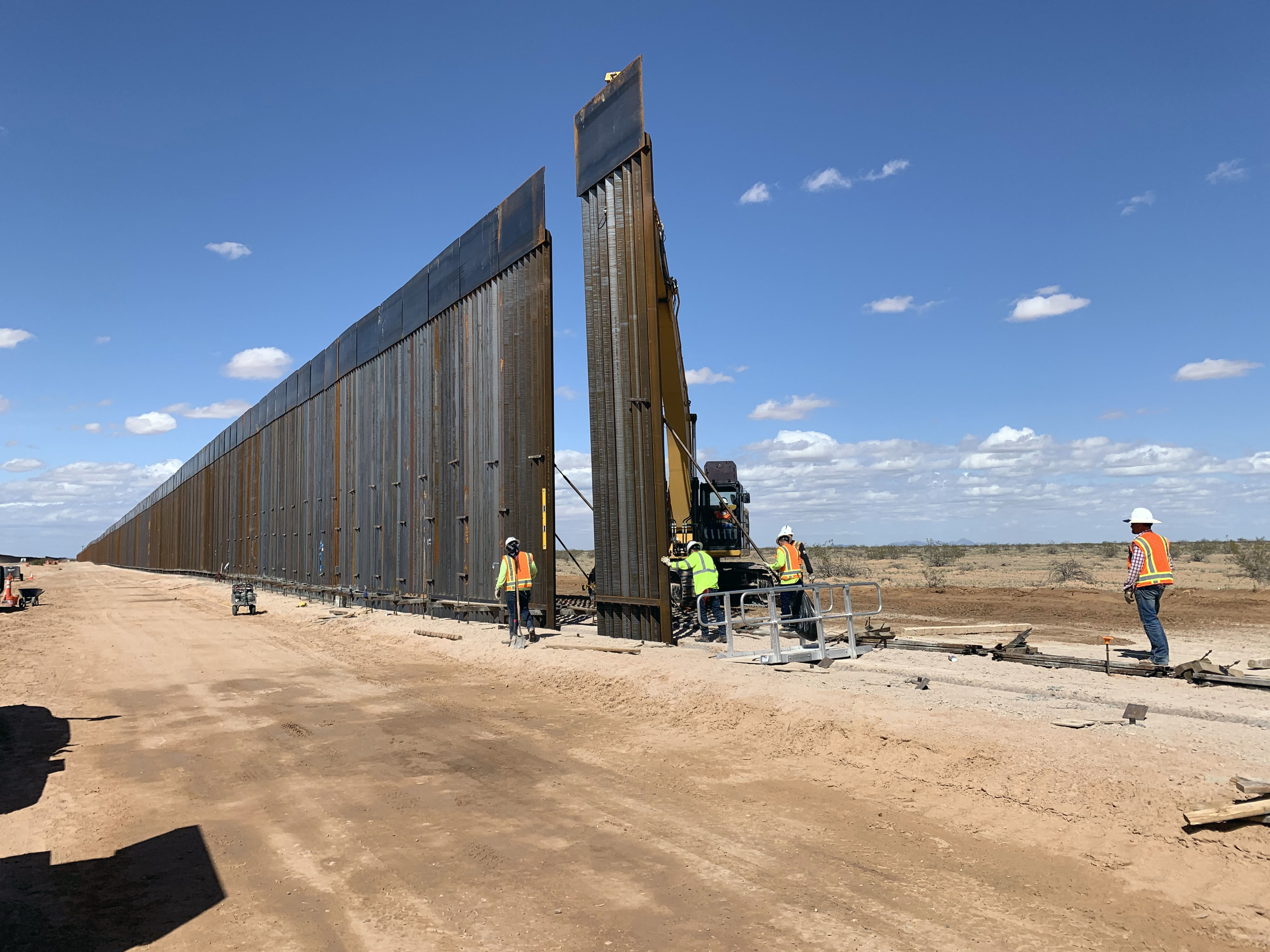
Crews install 30-foot (9.1 m) barrier along the Barry M. Goldwater Range's U.S.–Mexico border.

Despite warning signs along its southern perimeter in English and Spanish stating that the BMGR is U.S. Government property, that it is an active military bombing range and that unauthorized entry is prohibited, the BMGR remains among the treacherous access areas southwest of Tucson for Mexican, Salvadoran, and other Central and South American migrants crossing into the United States without documentation, where many have perished. Aid workers trying to save people from dying have signed up for annual passes to access the BMGR, including a waiver of liability for live bombing, but some workers have been banned and threatened with trespassing charges, citing property policy that requires everything packed in to also be brought out.

In August 2018, The Marshall Project reported in an interview on the progressive news program Democracy Now! about the inability to deliver food, water, and other aid to migrants due to restrictions barring the access to the military area. Freelance Mexican-American investigative reporter John Carlos Frey later told Democracy Now! that a team from the volunteer search-and-rescue group Aguilas del Desierto ("Eagles of the Desert") discovered a dozen bodies in a small area they were allowed to search for two weekends, but fear at least hundreds more have died there. The United States Border Patrol deployed support beacons to request emergency assistance, also called "help stations", are shown scattered throughout the area on the accompanying map published by the Marines.

In 2020, crews were installing three-ton (2,700 kg), 30-foot (9.1 m) barrier panels along the BMGR's U.S.–Mexico border near Yuma, Arizona. Executed by the U.S. Army Corps of Engineers, the barrier construction is in response to the Presidential National Emergency Declaration of 2019 requiring the use of the U.S. armed forces to help secure the U.S. southern border.

In July 2025, the Pentagon shifted $200 million in funding originally allocated for projects including barracks, aircraft hangars and military-operated elementary schools to construct a wall along the BMGR. With the Department of War as the Executing Agency, the construction contract was awarded by the United States Army Corps of Engineers South Pacific Task Force to BFBC LLC, a specialized subsidiary of Barnard Construction Company, on August 15, 2025. Construction commenced on October 15, 2025, and installation of 15.22 miles of wall along the Range was completed on April 15, 2026, approximately two months ahead of schedule.

== Popular culture ==
The range is the setting for §4, Part 4, in Don DeLillo's Underworld (1997).

In season 1, episode 3 of The Mosquito Coast on AppleTV, the Fox family and coyote Chuy cross the range to flee the U.S. government and cross into Mexico.

In a fictional story of the SCP Foundation an area where SCP-165 lives - a supposedly contagious, pathological organism - was found near Goldwater Air Force Bombing Range.
