= Laguna Mountains (Arizona) =

Landform in Yuma County, Arizona

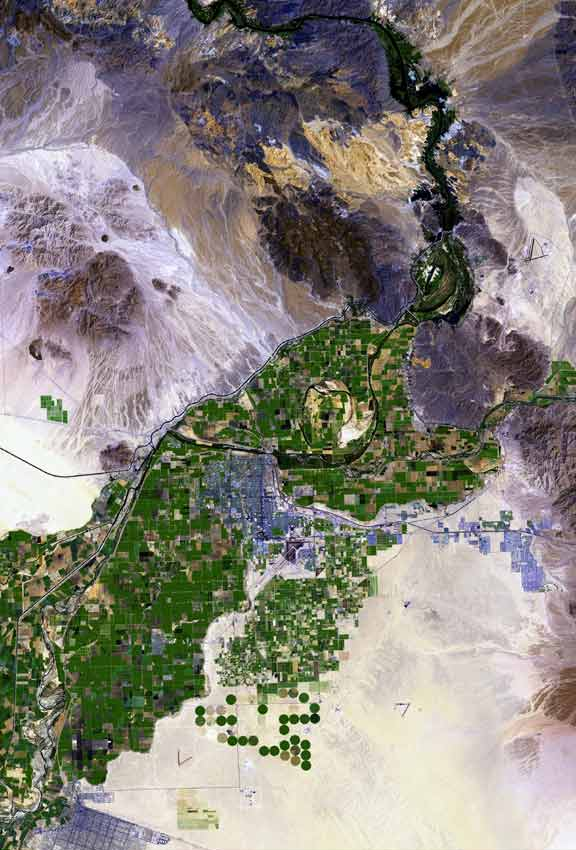
- Cargo Muchacho & Chocolate Mountains-(W & NW) ( ~ ) Circular Laguna Mountains (northeast of green agriculture) (black range north: SE-(section)-Chocolate Mtns

Highest point
- Peak: Boot Peak
- Elevation: 1,080 ft (330 m)

Dimensions
- Length: 7 mi (11 km) (N-S)
- Width: 7 mi (11 km) (E-W)

Geography
- Location within Arizona
- Country: United States
- State: Arizona
- Regions: Lower Colorado River Valley; Gila River Valley; ((northwest)-Sonoran Desert
- County: Yuma County, Arizona
- Settlements: Yuma, AZ–Fortuna Foothills, AZ; Winterhaven, CA
- Range coordinates: 32°49′23″N 114°29′39″W
- Borders on: Colorado River-W; Mittry Lake-NW; Chocolate Mountains (California)-NW; Gila R. & Gila Mountains (Yuma County)-SE; Gila Valley (Yuma County) & Yuma Mesa-S

The Laguna Mountains are a small, approximately circular mountain range of extreme southwest Arizona northeast of Yuma and east of Winterhaven, California on the Colorado River. The Colorado forms the western perimeter of the mountains; Mittry Lake, on the Colorado is on its northwest.

The Gila River is on the southeast and south perimeter, then has its confluence with the Colorado River.

Only the north and northeast of the range is not bordered by a river basin; the north contains a small drainage west to the Colorado and Mittry Lake, and borders the south of the Yuma Proving Grounds. The northeast is bordered by the south-flowing Castle Dome Wash, arising from the Castle Dome Mountains, with Castle Dome on the northwest of Castle Dome Plain, an eastern extension of the Yuma Proving Grounds.

== Laguna Mountains description ==
The range is a small range, circular, of about 7 miles (11 km). It is on the northeast of the Gila Valley, a Gila River valley, slightly east of the Laguna's and starting at the northern end of the Gila Mountains, and the valley containing northeast Yuma, and the agriculture fields that are north and northeast of the Yuma Mesa. A separate Yuma Valley is found west and southwest of Yuma, bordered on the north, west, and southwest by the Colorado River. The due north-trending section of U.S. Route 95 begins at the southeast of the mountain range; the road exits the northeast of the Gila Valley to begin its northern stretch towards Quartzsite, Arizona, about 90 mi.

The high point of the range is Boot Peak, at 1,080 feet (329 m). The range is mineralized with historical mining claims, some still operating.

== Recreational use ==
The range is noted for a shooting range on its south perimeter, named Adair Park. It is located in the North Gila Valley and just northwest of the northern end of the Gila Mountains of Yuma County.
