= Gila Mountains (Yuma County) =

Landform in Arizona

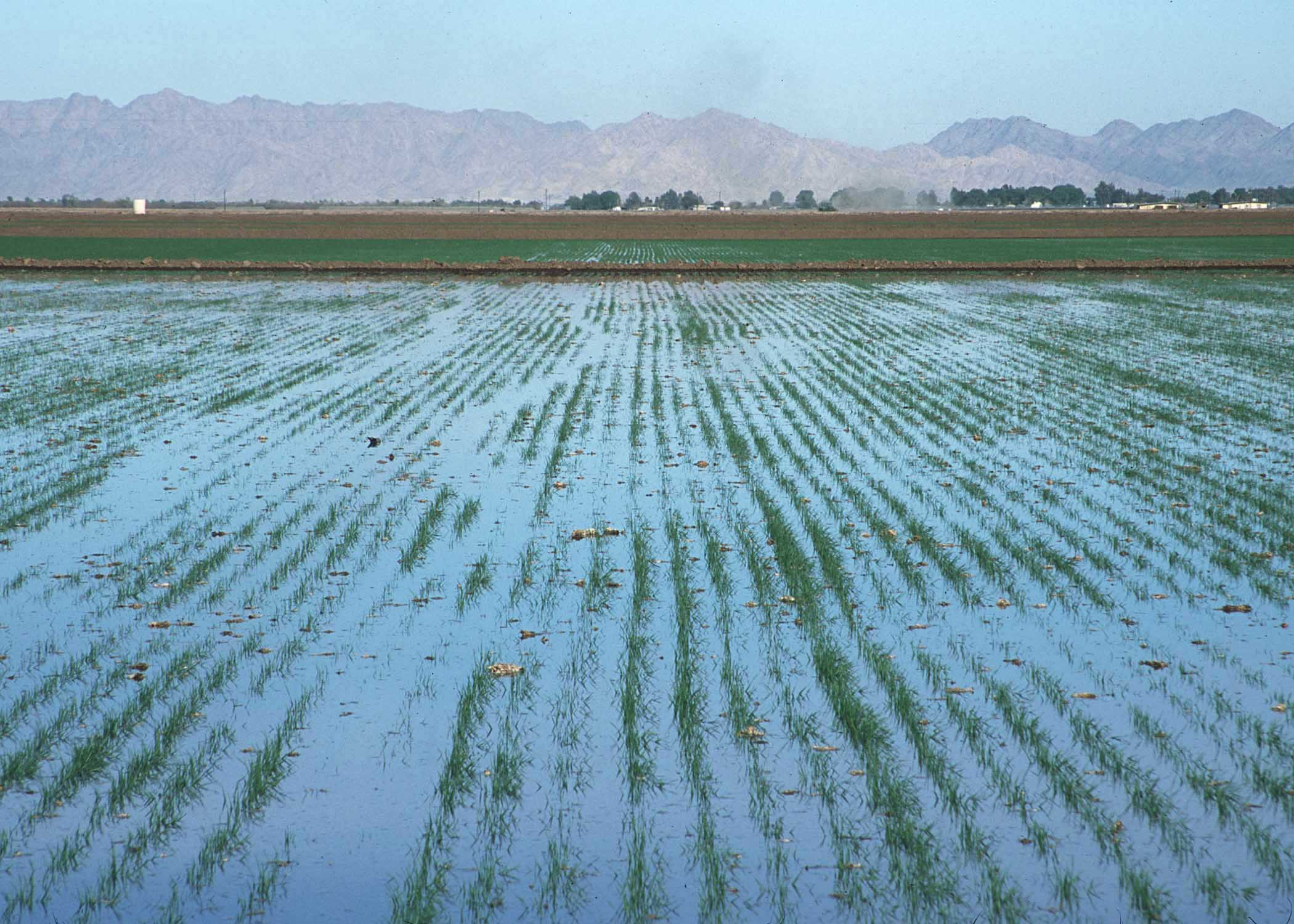
- west flank of range-(~8-mi east) (viewed from east Yuma agriculture fields, note constant elevation-ridgeline, north range terminus)

Highest point
- Peak: Sheep Mountain
- Elevation: 3,156 ft (962 m)
- Coordinates: 32°34′30″N 114°18′36″W

Dimensions
- Length: 26 mi (42 km) – NW x SE
- Width: 5 mi (8.0 km)

Geography
- Location within Arizona
- Country: United States
- State: Arizona
- Regions: Yuma Desert, Lechuguilla Desert, Lower Colorado River Valley and Sonoran Desert
- County: Yuma
- Communities: Yuma, Fortuna Foothills, Dome, Ligurta and Wellton
- Borders on: Fortuna Foothills, Yuma, Laguna Mountains, Gila River, Dome Valley, Lechuguilla Desert, Copper Mountains, Tinajas Altas Mountains and Yuma Desert

The Gila Mountains of Yuma County are a 26-mile (42 km) long mountain range in southwestern Arizona in the northwest Sonoran Desert.

The Gila Mountains of Yuma County are a northwest-southeast trending mountain system. The fault-blocked mountain range is attached on the south to the Tinajas Altas Mountains which continue southeast into Sonora, Mexico for another 30 miles. The northwest end of the mountains border the southeast Laguna Mountains. The Gila River flows through the Gila Valley between the Gilas and the Lagunas prior to its confluence with the Colorado.

The Gila Mountains are southeast of the confluence of the Colorado and Gila rivers in the Lower Colorado River Valley. The Gila River flows northwest, north around the mountain's north end, then west six miles to the Colorado. On the northeast side of the Gila Range, the low-elevation basin, Dome Valley is created between the Muggins Mountains and the Muggins Mountains Wilderness to the northeast. The block faulted mountain series ends at this confluence location and the Muggins Mountains are at the southern and southwest end of an extensive plain that transitions north towards the Castle Dome Plain and Castle Dome Mountains. This plain is the location of the US Army Yuma Proving Ground on this east-west alluvial plain.

The highest peak in the arid and rugged Gila Mountains is Sheep Peak at 3,156 feet (962 m). The mountain range lies east of Yuma and the community of Fortuna Foothills lies on the northwest mountain range foothills, (named for the Fortuna Mine). The mountain range is located in the western portion of the Barry M. Goldwater Air Force Range which is used by the MCAS, the Marine Corps Air Station, Yuma.

== Ecology ==
A variety of flora and fauna are represented in the Gila Mountains. Trees include Dalea spinosa and Bursera microphylla.

== Interstate 8 ==
One of the oldest sections of the Interstate Highway System in the US goes through a two-tiered highway section through Telegraph Pass at the north end of the range. The Interstate 8 roadcuts in the area of Telegraph Pass expose some of the oldest metamorphic rocks in the state of Arizona, outside of rocks exposed at the bottom of the Grand Canyon.

== Mountain acquisition controversy ==
A recent controversy involves acquisition of parts of the Gila Mountains by the city of Yuma, Arizona. The controversy is protection versus land use by agencies. The mountains are presently in the Barry M. Goldwater Air Force Range.

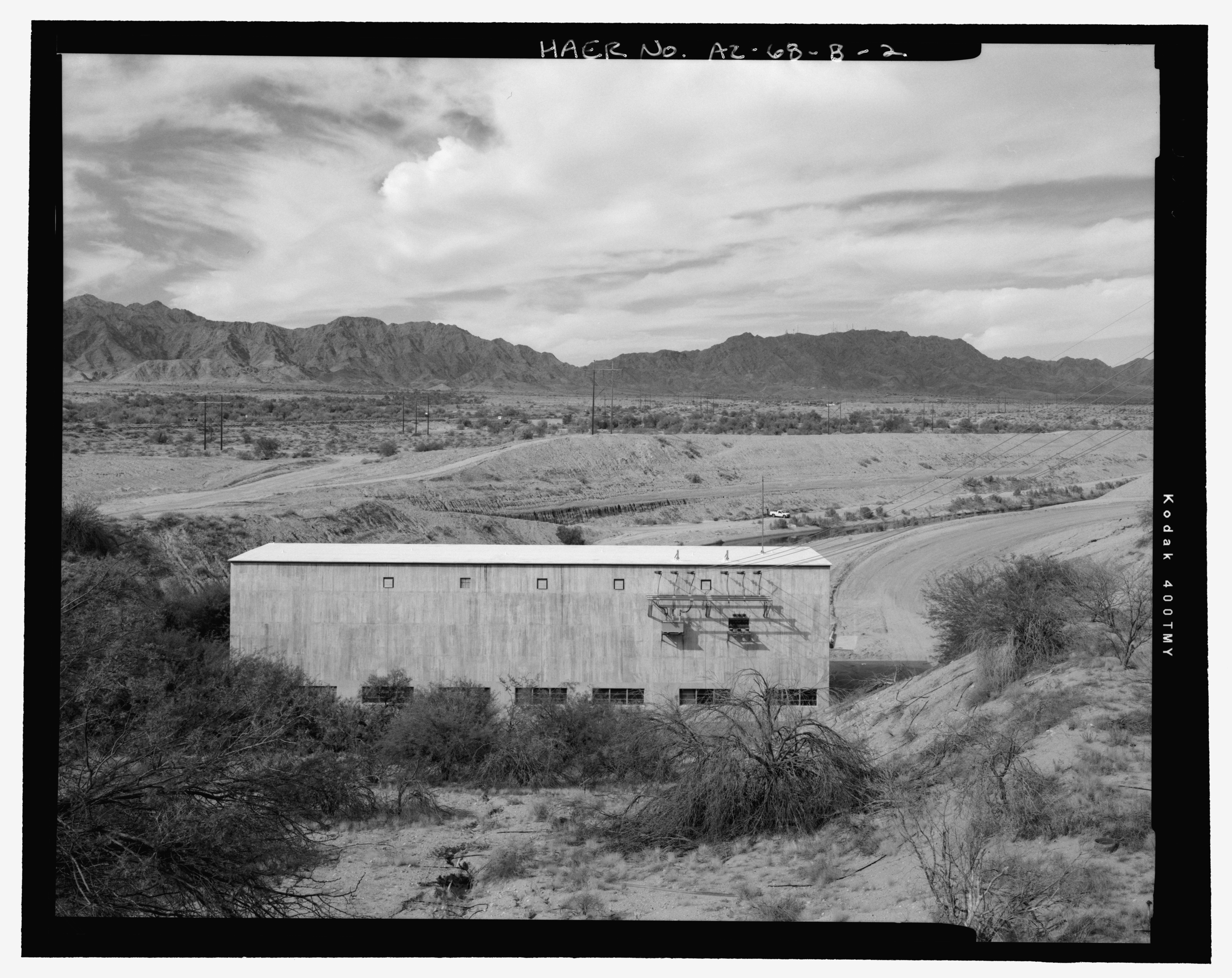
View from west: central & northern regions of Gila Mountains (eastern flank of mountain range from Lower Gila River Valley with north end of Lechuguilla Desert)

== See also ==
- Laguna Mountains (Arizona)
- Tinajas Altas Mountains & High Tanks-(Tinajas Altas)
- Tule Mountains
- Valley and range sequence-Southern Yuma County
- List of mountain ranges of Yuma County, Arizona
- List of mountain ranges of Arizona
- List of LCRV Wilderness Areas (Colorado River)
