= Lechuguilla Desert =

Landform in southwestern Arizona

Coordinates: 32.4181104°N 113.9832679°W

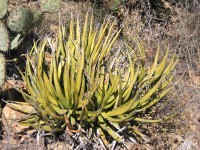
Agave lechuguilla, a plant confined to the Chihuahuan desert that also uses this name.

The Lechuguilla Desert is a small desert located in southwestern Arizona near the U.S.-Mexico border. It is considered to be part of the Lower Colorado Valley region of the Sonoran Desert. It lies in a north–south direction between the Gila Mountains and the Cabeza Prieta Mountains, and almost entirely in the Barry M. Goldwater Air Force Range. The desert is named after the lechuguilla plant, known scientifically as Agave lecheguilla, which occurs exclusively in the Chihuahuan desert many hundreds of miles to the east. The desert is also on the north border of the Gran Desierto de Altar of Sonora, Mexico.

The Lechuguilla Desert lies to the east-northeast of the connected ranges, Gila Mountains, and north of the Tinajas Altas Mountains, which extend southeast into north Sonora. To the west and southwest of the two ranges lies the Yuma Desert. The Tule Desert (Arizona) lies east of the Lechuguilla, and the Cabeza Prieta Mountains; all three deserts are at the northwest perimeter of the great desert, the Gran Desierto de Altar, and the Pinacate Peaks volcanic field region.

== See also ==
- Agave lechuguilla
- List of flora of the Sonoran Desert Region by common name
- Fauna of the Sonoran Desert
