= Aguilas del Desierto =

Aguilas del Desierto (English: Eagles of the Desert) is a volunteer organization in the United States. Co-founded by Ely Ortiz in 2009, its aim is to look for migrants or undocumented Migrant workers who go missing as they cross the Mexico–United States border.
