= Sheep Mountain (Nye County, Nevada) =

Summit in the U.S. state of Nevada

- Location within Nevada

Highest point
- Elevation: 2,487 m (8,159 ft)
- Coordinates: 38°26′43.90″N 116°55′13.53″W

Geography
- Location: Nye County, Nevada

Sheep Mountain is a summit in the U.S. state of Nevada. The elevation is 8,159 feet (2,487 m).

Sheep Mountain was so named on account of wild sheep once seen in the area.

The nearly 4500 feet of vertical relief creates a rich and outstanding vegetative diversity for nature study.
