= Gran Desierto de Altar =

Region of the Sonoran Desert

Coordinates: 31.95°N 114.14°W

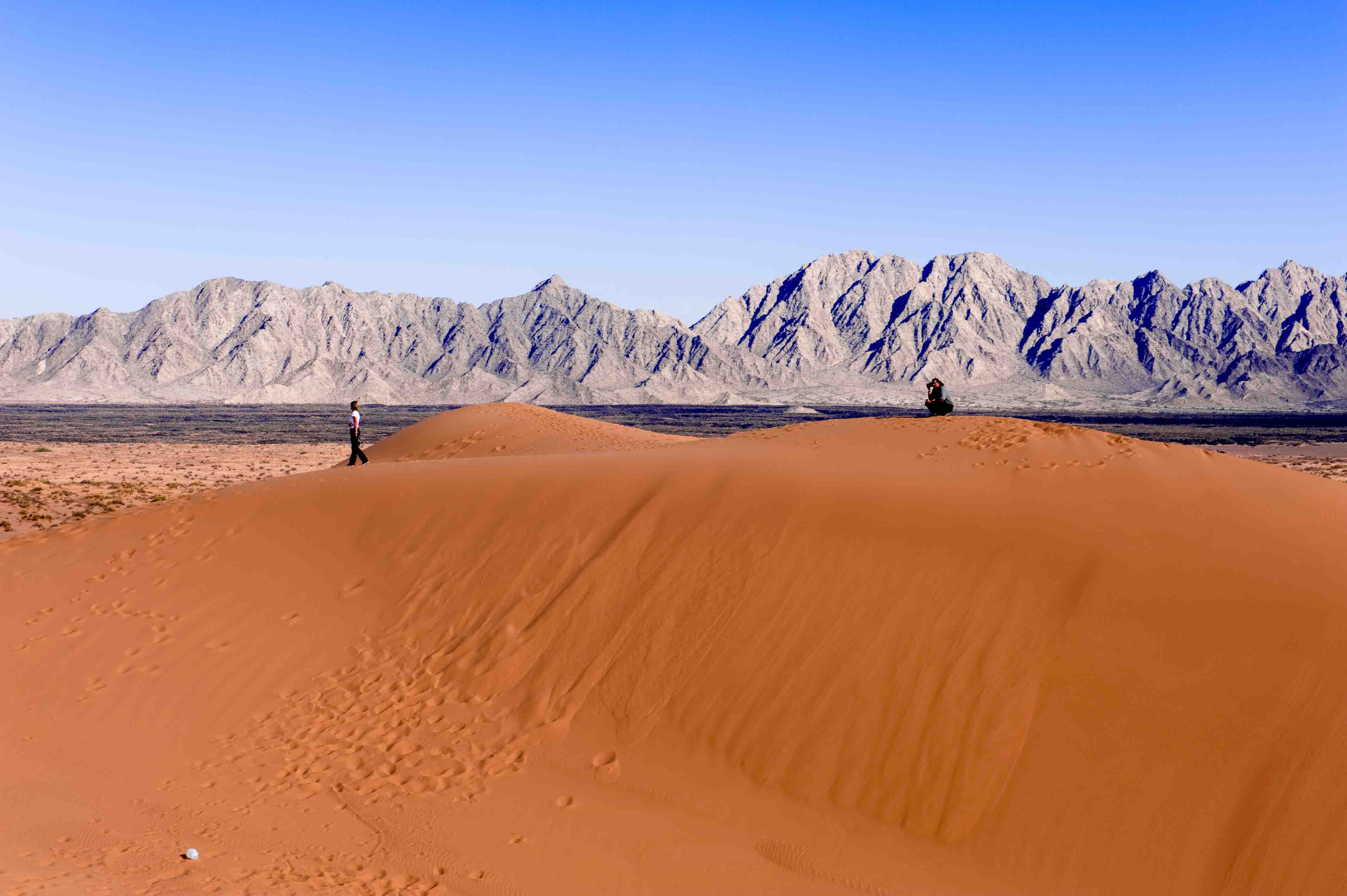
- Sand dunes at El Pinacate y Gran Desierto de Altar Biosphere Reserve, northwestern Sonora, México

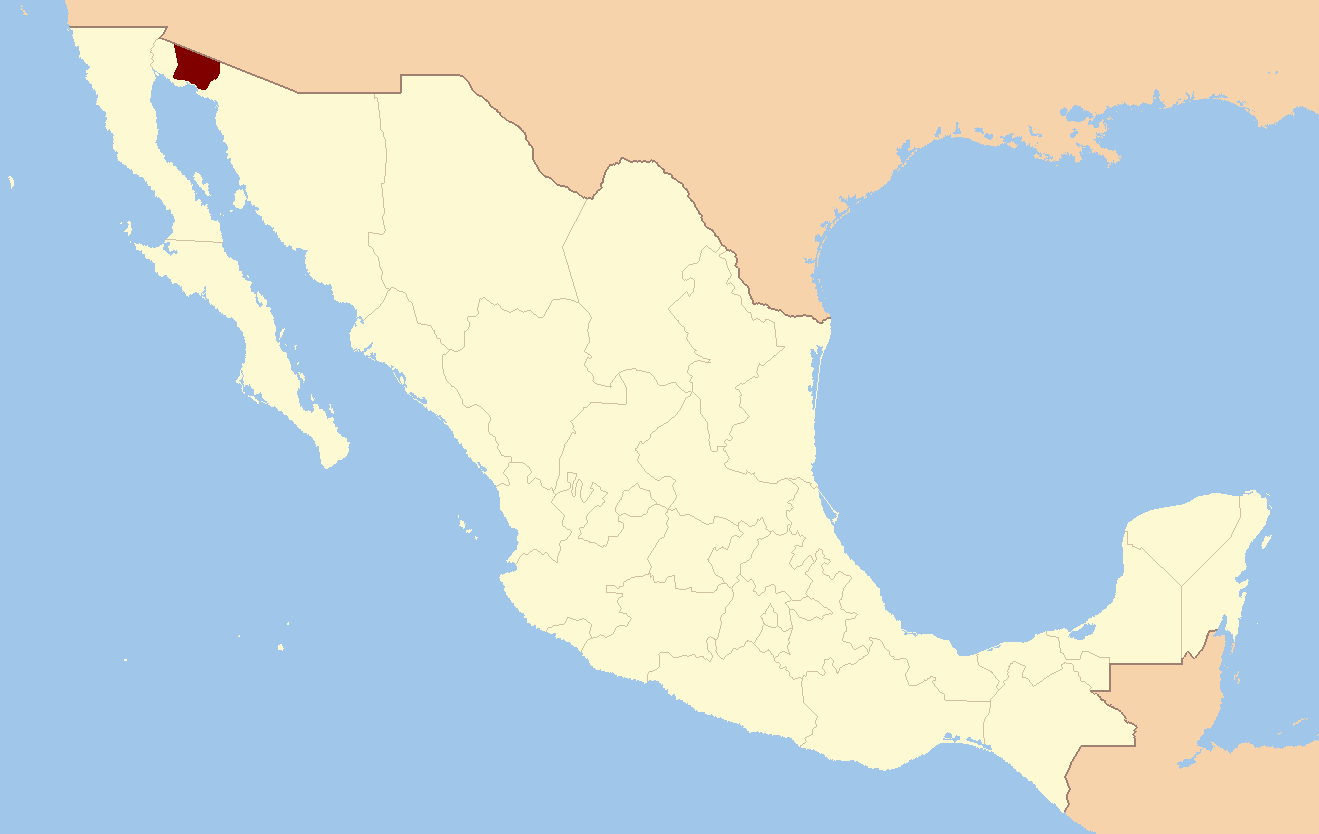
- Locator map of the Gran Desierto de Altar, in Sonora, Mexico

Ecology
- Realm: Nearctic
- Biome: Desert

Geography
- Area: 5,700 km^{2} (2,200 mi^{2})
- Country: Mexico
- State: Sonora
- Climate type: BWh

The Gran Desierto de Altar is one of the major sub-ecoregions of the Sonoran Desert, located in the State of Sonora in northwest Mexico. It includes the only active erg (sand sea) dune region in North America. The desert extends across much of the northern border of the Gulf of California, spanning more than 100 kilometres (62 mi) east to west and over 50 kilometres (31 mi) north to south. It constitutes the largest continuous wilderness area within the Sonoran Desert.

The eastern portion of the area contains the volcanic Pinacate Peaks region; together with the western portion, the area forms the El Pinacate y Gran Desierto de Altar Biosphere Reserve and a UNESCO World Heritage Site.

== Geography ==
The Gran Desierto covers approximately 5,700 square kilometres (2,200 sq mi), most of it in the Mexican state of Sonora. The northernmost edges reach across the international border into Organ Pipe Cactus National Monument and Cabeza Prieta National Wildlife Refuge in southwestern Arizona, United States. The region is dominated by sand sheets and dunes ranging in thickness from less than 1 kilometre (0.62 mi) to greater than 12 kilometres (7.5 mi). The total volume of sand in the Gran Desierto is about 60 cubic kilometres (14 mi^{3}). Most of that volume was delivered by the Colorado River during the Pleistocene, which flowed through the present-day Gran Desierto area approximately 120,000 years before present. This Pleistocene delta migrated westward concomitant with strike-slip faulting and rifting associated with the opening of the Salton Trough and the Gulf of California.

The eastern margin of the Gran Desierto abuts the Cenozoic volcanic complex of the Sierra Pinacate, a composite volcanic field covering more than 1,800 square kilometres (690 sq mi) with a summit elevation of 1,206 metres (3,957 ft). Aeolian sands have climbed onto many of the western slopes of the Sierra Pinacate, defining the eastern limit of the dune field. To the north, the sands thin out against the distal margins of alluvial fans from the Tinajas Altas and Tule Mountains along the Arizona–Sonora border. The southern border of the sand sea is the northern shore of the Gulf of California.

The southernmost extension of the San Andreas Fault cuts across the area and lies beneath several prominent granite inselbergs, most notably the Sierra del Rosario mountains, which are surrounded by the erg on all sides. The Sierra Enterrada is a smaller inselberg almost completely buried by the sand near the boundary of the Gran Desierto and the Pinacate volcanic complex.

=== Sand dune distribution ===
The Gran Desierto is best known for its magnificent star dunes, many in excess of 100 metres (330 ft) high. More than two-thirds of the Gran Desierto is covered by sand sheets and sand streaks. The remaining area is split equally between a western population of star dunes and an eastern set of transverse or crescentic dunes. Some of the larger crescentic dunes in the northeastern sand sea exhibit reversing crests, a transitional morphological feature associated with star dunes.

== Flora ==
Fauna of the Gran Desierto includes a range of desert-adapted reptiles, small mammals, and migratory bird species typical of the Sonoran Desert ecosystem.

Vegetation assemblages of the Gran Desierto are typical of the lower Sonoran Desert with a marked difference in vegetation type and density with location. Large areas of the southern and eastern sand sea, especially near the margins, have a moderately dense (up to 20%) cover of perennial low shrubs and herbs such as bursage (Ambrosia dumosa) and longleaf jointfir (Ephedra trifurca) with creosote bush (Larrea tridentata) in areas of thin sand cover. Palo verde/acacia/ocotillo communities occur on alluvial slopes on the northern side of the sand sea, particularly in arroyos and washes. The region's estimated total vegetation cover is 15% in the star dunes and about 10% in the low transverse or crescentic dunes areas. These percentages are substantially greater than in most active dune fields, where vegetation covers of 15% are more typical.

Several teams have examined the middens built by pack rats as a proxy for ancient vegetation regimes. All have concluded that the Gran Desierto has been an ecological refuge for desert plants since at least the late Pleistocene. The Gran Desierto has served as a refuge for most dominant Mojave Desert plant species during cooler pluvial epochs as well. Carbon-14 dating for a midden from the Tinajas Altas Mountains shows assemblages of juniper and Joshua trees coexisting with contemporary Gran Desierto flora and fauna more than 43,000 years before present. Although midden studies do not provide information beyond the late Pleistocene, they do indicate that, in gross form, the climate of the Gran Desierto as recorded by plant communities has been desert-like since at least the peak of the Wisconsinan glaciation.

== Climate ==
The Gran Desierto has a warm to hot arid climate. Mean annual rainfall, most of which occurs between September and December, is 73 mm (2.9 in) at Puerto Peñasco, Sonora (located at the southeastern margin of the sand sea on the Gulf of California) and decreases northward toward Yuma, Arizona (on the northwestern edge) to 62 mm (2.4 in) per year. Mid-summer highs in excess of 45 °C (113 °F) are common in the central sand sea. Mid-winter lows of less than 10 °C (50 °F) are rare. Winds are controlled in part by the position and strength of the Sonoran Low in summer, creating southerly winds, and by the Great Basin High in winter, with north-to-northeasterly winds.

=== Paleoclimate ===
The well-documented pluvial epochs which occurred over much of the southwestern United States during the most-recent (Wisconsin) ice age may not have extended as far south as the Gran Desierto. It appears that the climatic regime of the past 150,000 years at this site has been one of gradually increasing aridity with current hyper-arid conditions being firmly in place by at least 43,000 years ago. As a minimum, it may be assumed that onshore coastal winds from the south were less important to sand movement when the Wisconsin shoreline was located 45 km (28 mi) seaward of its current position.

== Geology ==
The geological history of the Gran Desierto is intimately linked to the opening of the Gulf of California and the capture of the ancestral Colorado River; source areas that were adjacent to the Gran Desierto have shifted in position, basement topography has been altered continuously, and bedforms have been created, modified, or completely destroyed and then reworked.

The Gran Desierto sand sheets and dunes are located atop deltaic deposits of the Pleistocene Colorado River. The lower Colorado River was captured by the Gulf of California 1.2 million years before present. This event places an upper bound on the age of the Gran Desierto with the Colorado's major clastic sediment sources. Conglomeritic sands and silts beneath the Mesa Arenosa were examined by Colletta and Ortlieb and dated at between 700,000 and 120,000 years before present.

Vertebrate fossils found by Merriam within the deltaic deposits include Equus, Gomphotherium, and Bison and were assigned to Irvingtonian age (0.5 to 1.8 million years before present), dates consistent with the aforementioned capture of the lower Colorado River. Evidence of a giant anteater, Myrmecophaga tridactyla, was found in the deltaic deposits in the southern Gran Desierto. Van Devender notes that the specimen was found in association with fossils of mammoths, sloths, and boa constrictors, a tropical faunal assemblage which supports a contention that the Colorado River delta of a previous interglacial period (>120,000 years ago) was much warmer and wetter than in the present interglacial.

Paleo-deltaic deposits near Salina Grande correlate with a ubiquitous indurated shell deposit dated by Io/U radiometric methods at 146,000 +13,000/-11,000 years of age. Slate (1985) obtained K-Ar ages for basalt flows in the western Pinacates; based on this work, some aeolian activity may have been present as early as 700,000 years ago, as evidenced by the dated accretionary mantles on basalt flows of the Pinacate volcanic field.

Blount and Lancaster proposed that by late Pleistocene time, the Colorado River was a highly competent stream flowing through the area which is occupied today by the massive western star dune zone. The seashore at this time was at least 45 kilometres (28 mi) south of its present-day location. Primary bed loads of poorly sorted gravel were deposited from present-day Yuma, Arizona to an area south of the present-day Sierra del Rosario mountains. As rifting of the Gulf of California progressed to the northwest, and uplift along the coast began, the river channel shifted westward, leaving primary bedload deposits in the former channel and floodplain. Deltaic sediments beneath the Gran Desierto may be as much as 6,000 metres (20,000 ft) deep.

Annual sediment loads prior to the damming of the Colorado River were prodigious. A single flood event deposited an estimated 100,000,000 cubic metres (3.5×10^{9} ft^{3}) of coarse to medium sand as a sheet deposit on the modern delta just south of the international boundary. Events like this, even if rare, could fill up the Gran Desierto in only a few millennia.

=== Tectonics ===
The Gran Desierto is located adjacent to a rapidly subsiding tectonic basin, the Salton Trough, which is a northern extension of the Gulf of California, itself an embayment created by rifting initiated during the Pliocene along the East Pacific Rise and the San Andreas Fault system. Regional subsidence has propagated to the northwest as rifting and strike-slip faulting continues into the present day. The central portion of the nearby Salton Trough is more than 70 metres (230 ft) below sea level; it is protected from marine embayment only by the natural dike of the Colorado River Delta.

Ongoing tectonic activity modifies the Gran Desierto today. The southernmost extension of the San Andreas fault system, the Cerro Prieto Fault, passes directly through the area before continuing offshore into the Gulf of California. Strike-slip movement in the area is as high as 60 mm/year.

Since 1900, one magnitude 6.3 and two magnitude 7.1 earthquakes have originated within the erg. Most seismicity within the Gran Desierto originates at depths of 5 to 6 kilometres (3.1 to 3.7 mi), corresponding to the transition between deltaic deposits and basement crystalline rocks. Local uplift is still occurring along the Mesa Arenosa, a drag folded fault block forming the coastal boundary.

=== Offshore features ===
The synchronous development of the Colorado River Delta and the associated Gran Desierto sand sink continues offshore into the Gulf of California. Reports on the submarine topography of the Gulf of California by van Andel describe three former river channels on the seafloor: one originating at the present-day Colorado delta, another from the area of the paleo-delta between El Golfo and Salina Grande, and a third to the area of present-day Puerto Peñasco. Rusnak reported on sonar soundings which discovered the valleys and also describe two elongate depressions, each about 40 kilometres (25 mi) in length, into which the valley networks terminate at a depth of approximately 180 metres (590 ft) below sea level. Those incised valley systems were also interpreted as fluvial in origin.

== See also ==
- El Pinacate y Gran Desierto de Altar Biosphere Reserve
  - Pinacate Peaks
- Sonoran Desert
  - Colorado Desert
  - Lechuguilla Desert
  - Tule Desert
  - Yuma Desert
- Chihuahuan Desert
