= Sheep Mountain (Kenai Mountains) =

Mountain in Alaska, United States

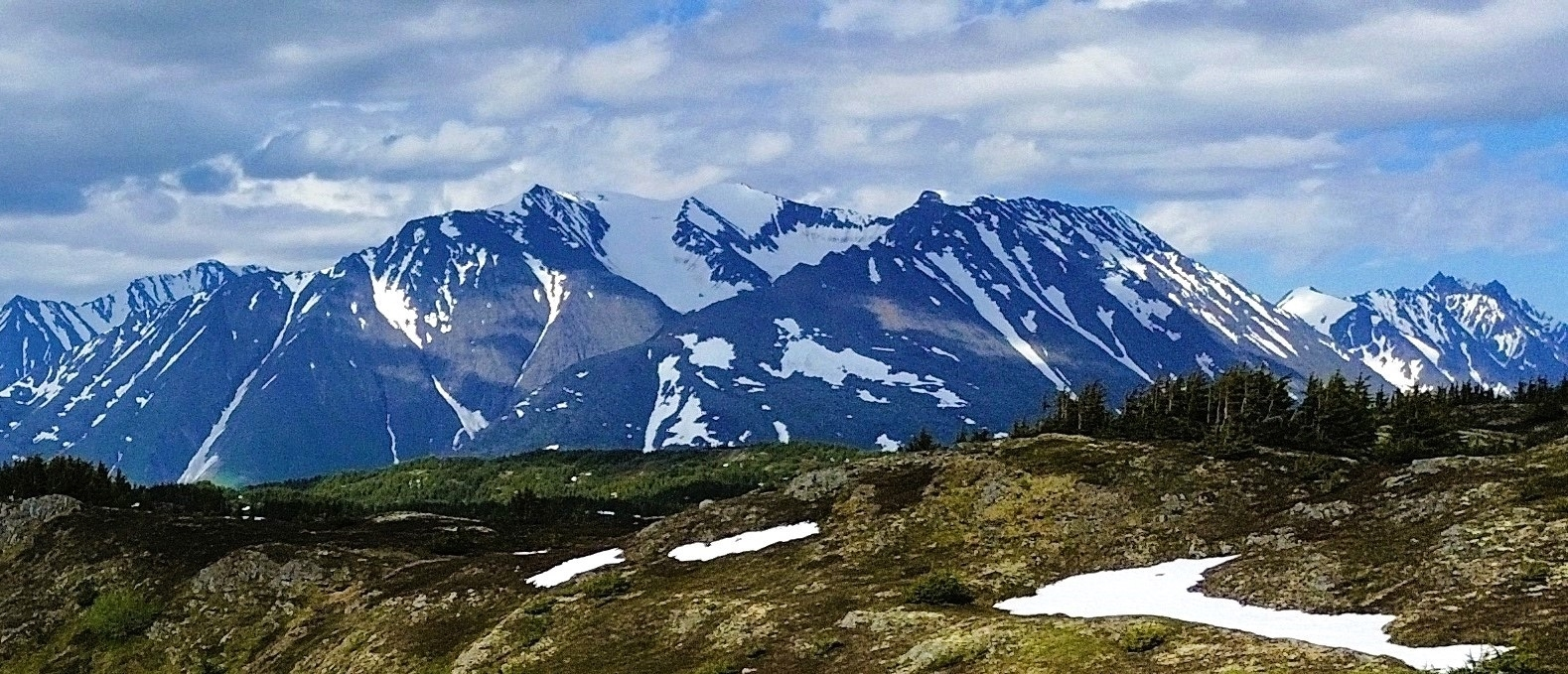
- Southwest aspect

Highest point
- Elevation: 6,305 ft (1,922 m)
- Prominence: 2,555 ft (779 m)
- Parent peak: Andy Simons Mountain
- Isolation: 2.52 mi (4.06 km)
- Coordinates: 60°20′21″N 149°16′19″W

Naming
- Etymology: Sheep

Geography
- Location within Alaska
- Country: United States
- State: Alaska
- Borough: Kenai Peninsula
- Protected area: Chugach National Forest
- Parent range: Kenai Mountains
- Topo map: USGS Seward B-7

Geology
- Rock age: Cretaceous
- Rock type: Metasedimentary rock

Sheep Mountain is a 6,305-foot-elevation (1,922-meter) summit in Alaska, United States.

== Description ==
Sheep Mountain is located on the Kenai Peninsula on land managed by Chugach National Forest. It is set 16 miles (26 km) north-northeast of the city of Seward in the Kenai Mountains. Although modest in elevation, topographic relief is significant as the summit rises 5,870 feet (1,789 meters) above Kenai Lake in 2.6 miles (4.2 km). Precipitation runoff from the mountain drains into Snow River and Victor Creek which are part of the Kenai River drainage basin. The mountain received its name because sheep could be seen on the side of the mountain at almost any time, and the toponym was officially adopted on November 2, 1910, by the U.S. Board on Geographic Names.

== Climate ==
Based on the Köppen climate classification, Sheep Mountain is located in a subpolar oceanic climate zone with long, cold, snowy winters, and mild summers. Weather systems coming off the Gulf of Alaska are forced upwards by the Kenai Mountains (orographic lift), causing heavy precipitation in the form of rainfall and snowfall. Winter temperatures can drop below 0 °F with wind chill factors below −10 °F. This climate supports several small unnamed glaciers on the mountain as well as the Mother Goose Glacier to the east.

== See also ==
- List of mountain peaks of Alaska
- Geology of Alaska
