= Graham, Arizona =

Populated place in Graham County, Arizona

- Populated Place
- Location within the state of Arizona Graham (the United States)
- Coordinates: 32°52′30″N 109°44′26″W
- Country: United States
- State: Arizona
- County: Graham
- Elevation: 2,887 ft (880 m)
- Time zone: UTC-7 (Mountain (MST))
  - Summer (DST): UTC-7 (MST)
- Area code: 928
- FIPS code: 28520
- GNIS feature ID: 25298

Graham is a populated place situated in Graham County, Arizona, United States.

The first settlement at Graham was made in 1880 by a colony of Mormons. A post office called Graham was established in 1882, and remained in operation until 1885. The community takes its name from Graham County.
