= Sheep Island =

The following locations are known as Sheep Island:

== United Kingdom ==
- Sheep Island, County Antrim, Northern Ireland
- Sheep Island, Argyll, Argyll and Bute, Scotland
- Sheep Island (England), Cumbria
- Sheep Island, Pembrokeshire, an island of Wales
- Insh Island, Slate Islands, Argyll and Bute, Scotland

== United States ==
- Sheep Island (Massachusetts), Massachusetts, United States
- Sheep Island (Washington), Washington, United States
- Sheep Island, an alternate name for Brooks Island, Richmond, California

== Other ==
- Sheep Island (Nova Scotia), Nova Scotia, Canada
- Faroe Islands, Northern Europe, Faroe can be translated to 'sheep'.
- An island in Rice Lake (Ontario)
