= Electric Sheep (disambiguation) =

Electric Sheep may mean the following:

- Electric Sheep, a distributed computing project for generating, downloading, and playing fractal movies while the screen saver is running
- Electric Sheep Comix, an electronic comic book anthology Web page created by Berkeley-based artist Patrick Farley
- Electric Sheep, album by The Phenomenauts

== See also ==
- Do Androids Dream of Electric Sheep?, a 1968 science fiction novel by Philip K. Dick, and basis for the 1982 film Blade Runner.
