= Fortuna Foothills, Arizona =

CDP in Yuma County, Arizona

- CDP
- Location in Yuma County and the state of Arizona

- Location in Arizona Location in the United States
- Coordinates: 32°39′12″N 114°22′12″W
- Country: United States
- State: Arizona
- County: Yuma

Area
  - Total: 40.08 sq mi (103.81 km^{2})
  - Land: 40.08 sq mi (103.81 km^{2})
  - Water: 0 sq mi (0.00 km^{2})
- Elevation: 345 ft (105 m)

Population (2020)
  - Total: 27,776
  - Density: 693.0/sq mi (267.56/km^{2})
- Time zone: UTC-7 (MST (no DST))
- ZIP code: 85367
- Area code: 928
- FIPS code: 04-25030
- GNIS feature ID: 2408247

Fortuna Foothills is a census-designated place (CDP) in Yuma County, Arizona, United States. The population was 26,265 at the 2010 census. It is part of city of Yuma, Arizona and the Yuma County Metropolitan Statistical Area. Development of the area began in the 1960s, when local developer Hank Schechert purchased 3,000 acres east of Yuma. Fortuna Foothills serves as a bedroom community for Yuma, Yuma Proving Ground, and Marine Corps Air Station Yuma. Fortuna Foothills is also an area with a large amount of seasonal residents.

== Geography ==
Fortuna Foothills lies on Interstate 8 on the western edge of the Gila Mountains. According to the United States Census Bureau, the CDP has a total area of 40.0 square miles (104 km^{2}), all land.

== Demographics ==
Historical population
Census	Pop.	Note	%±
1990	7,737		—
2000	20,478		164.7%
2010	26,265		28.3%
2020	27,776		5.8%

=== 2020 census ===
As of the 2020 census, Fortuna Foothills had a population of 27,776. The median age was 61.2 years. 13.7% of residents were under the age of 18 and 44.1% of residents were 65 years of age or older. For every 100 females there were 96.3 males, and for every 100 females age 18 and over there were 95.6 males age 18 and over.

98.4% of residents lived in urban areas, while 1.6% lived in rural areas.

There were 13,095 households in Fortuna Foothills, of which 15.6% had children under the age of 18 living in them. Of all households, 54.7% were married-couple households, 17.7% were households with a male householder and no spouse or partner present, and 21.6% were households with a female householder and no spouse or partner present. About 30.0% of all households were made up of individuals and 20.4% had someone living alone who was 65 years of age or older.

There were 22,609 housing units, of which 42.1% were vacant. The homeowner vacancy rate was 2.6% and the rental vacancy rate was 9.7%.

Racial composition as of the 2020 census
Race	Number	Percent
White	20,997	75.6%
Black or African American	313	1.1%
American Indian and Alaska Native	310	1.1%
Asian	335	1.2%
Native Hawaiian and Other Pacific Islander	46	0.2%
Some other race	2,446	8.8%
Two or more races	3,329	12.0%
Hispanic or Latino (of any race)	6,842	24.6%

=== 2000 census ===
At the 2000 census there were 20,478 people, 9,652 households, and 7,364 families in the CDP. The population density was 511.7 inhabitants per square mile (197.6/km^{2}). There were 14,961 housing units at an average density of 373.9 per square mile (144.4/km^{2}). The racial makeup of the CDP was 90.1% White, 0.4% Black or African American, 0.7% Native American, 0.5% Asian, 0.1% Pacific Islander, 6.6% from other races, and 1.6% from two or more races. 12.7% of the population were Hispanic or Latino of any race. Of the 9,652 households 11.9% had children under the age of 18 living with them, 71.1% were married couples living together, 3.5% had a female householder with no husband present, and 23.7% were non-families. 19.2% of households were one person and 12.4% were one person aged 65 or older. The average household size was 2.11 and the average family size was 2.37.

The age distribution was 11.8% under the age of 18, 2.8% from 18 to 24, 13.1% from 25 to 44, 27.9% from 45 to 64, and 44.5% 65 or older. The median age was 63 years. For every 100 females, there were 97.5 males. For every 100 females age 18 and over, there were 95.9 males.

The median household income was $34,135 and the median family income was $37,031. Males had a median income of $34,284 versus $24,576 for females. The per capita income for the CDP was $19,986. About 7.3% of families and 10.6% of the population were below the poverty line, including 23.3% of those under age 18 and 5.6% of those age 65 or over.

== Transportation ==
- Yuma County Area Transit
- Interstate 8

== Education ==
Most of the Fortuna Foothills CDP is within the Yuma Elementary School District and the Yuma Union High School District. A portion of the CDP is within the Wellton Elementary School District and the Antelope Union High School District.

The portion of Fortuna Foothills in Yuma ESD is zoned to the following: For elementary school, most of the area is zoned to Sunrise Elementary School while portions south of Interstate 8 and west of South Foothills Boulevard are zoned to Mary Otondo Elementary School. For middle school, it is divided between Ron Watson Middle School (the majority) and Castle Dome Middle School (areas south of Interstate 8 and west of South Foothills Boulevard). All of Fortuna Foothills in Yuma Union HSD is zoned to Gila Ridge High School.
