= Tule Desert (Arizona) =

Desert in southwestern Arizona

Coordinates: 32.2728352°N 113.6396396°W

The Tule Desert is a small desert located in southwestern Arizona near the U.S.-Mexico border. It is considered to be part of the Lower Colorado Valley region of the Sonoran Desert. It lies in a north–south direction to the east of the Cabeza Prieta Mountains and almost entirely in the Barry M. Goldwater Air Force Range. The Tule Desert also lies on the northern border of the Gran Desierto de Altar of Sonora, Mexico.

== See also ==
- List of flora of the Sonoran Desert Region by common name
- Fauna of the Sonoran Desert
