= Yuma Desert =

Part of the Sonoran Desert

Coordinates: 32.55°N 114.52°W

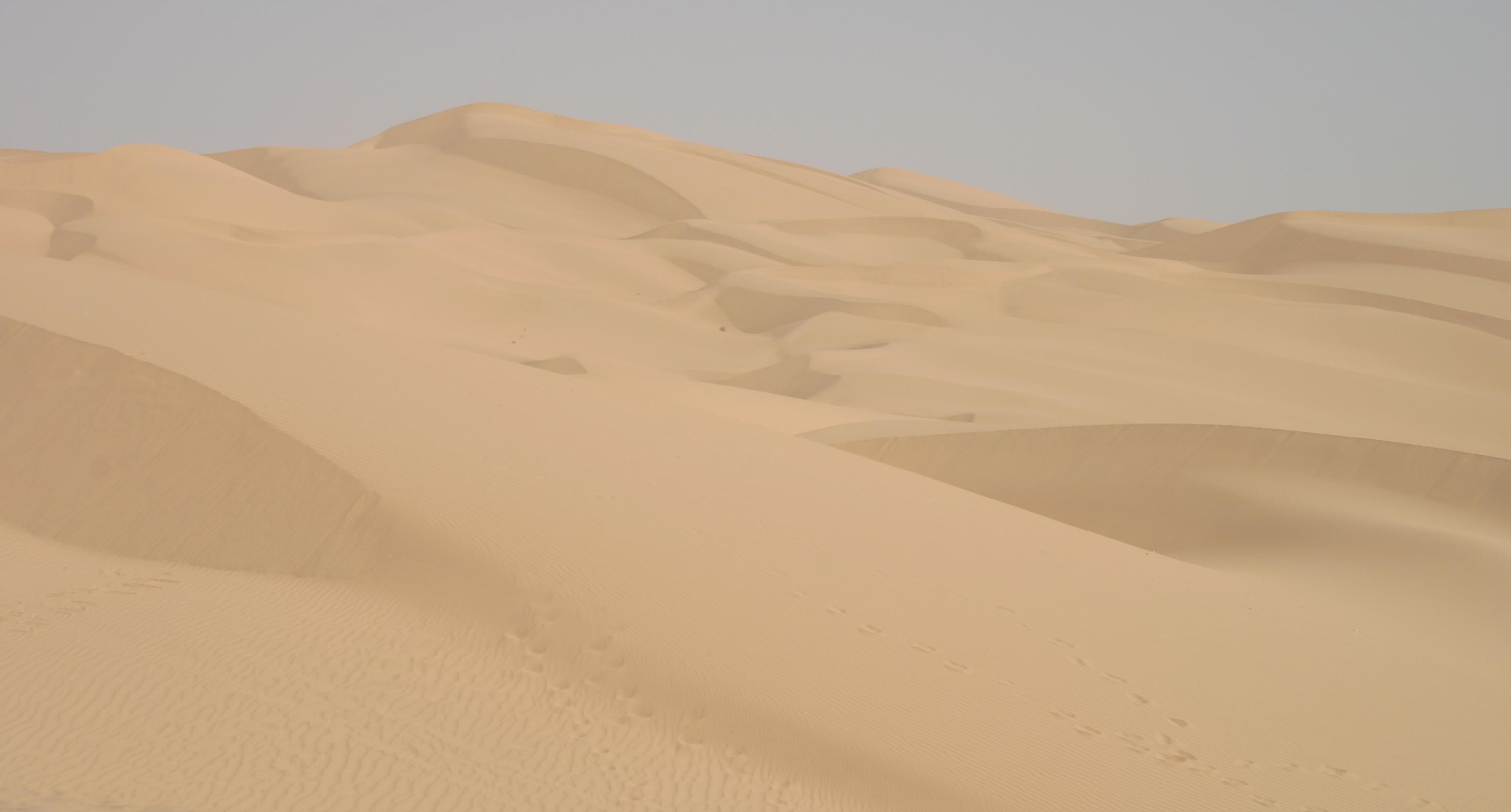
The Imperial Dunes in the Yuma Desert

The Yuma Desert is a lower-elevation section of the Sonoran Desert in the southwestern United States and the northwest of Mexico. It lies in the Salton basin. The desert contains areas of sparse vegetation and has notable areas of sand dunes. With an average annual rainfall of less than 8 inches (200 mm), it is among the harshest deserts in North America. Human presence is sparse throughout; the largest city is Yuma, Arizona, on the Colorado River and the border of California.

== Overview ==
The desert includes the lower-elevation parts of the southwestern corner of Arizona, extending west to the Colorado River. On the other side of the river, in California, is the Colorado Desert region of the Sonoran Desert, also referred to as the Low Desert. Although the two regions are separated only by the Colorado River, numerous species of plant and animals live only on one side or the other.

The Yuma Desert also includes the sandy plains of western Sonora, going all the way to the head of the Gulf of California, then an inland strip reaching into the central Sonoran interior. The most significant river in this desert is the Gila River of Arizona. Organ Pipe Cactus National Monument is located in this desert, as are the Kofa National Wildlife Refuge and Cabeza Prieta National Wildlife Refuge.

To the south of Arizona's Yuma Desert, in northern Mexico, is the Pinacate volcanic field and biosphere reserve, part of the Gran Desierto de Altar, which is the southern extension of the Yuma Desert. It is on the northwestern foothills of Mexico's Sierra Madre Occidental, the western mountain cordillera.

=== Origin of the name ===
The name Yuma desert has been in use since at least the 1929 geological mapping survey conducted by Eldred D. Wilson for the Arizona Bureau of Mines.

== Flora ==
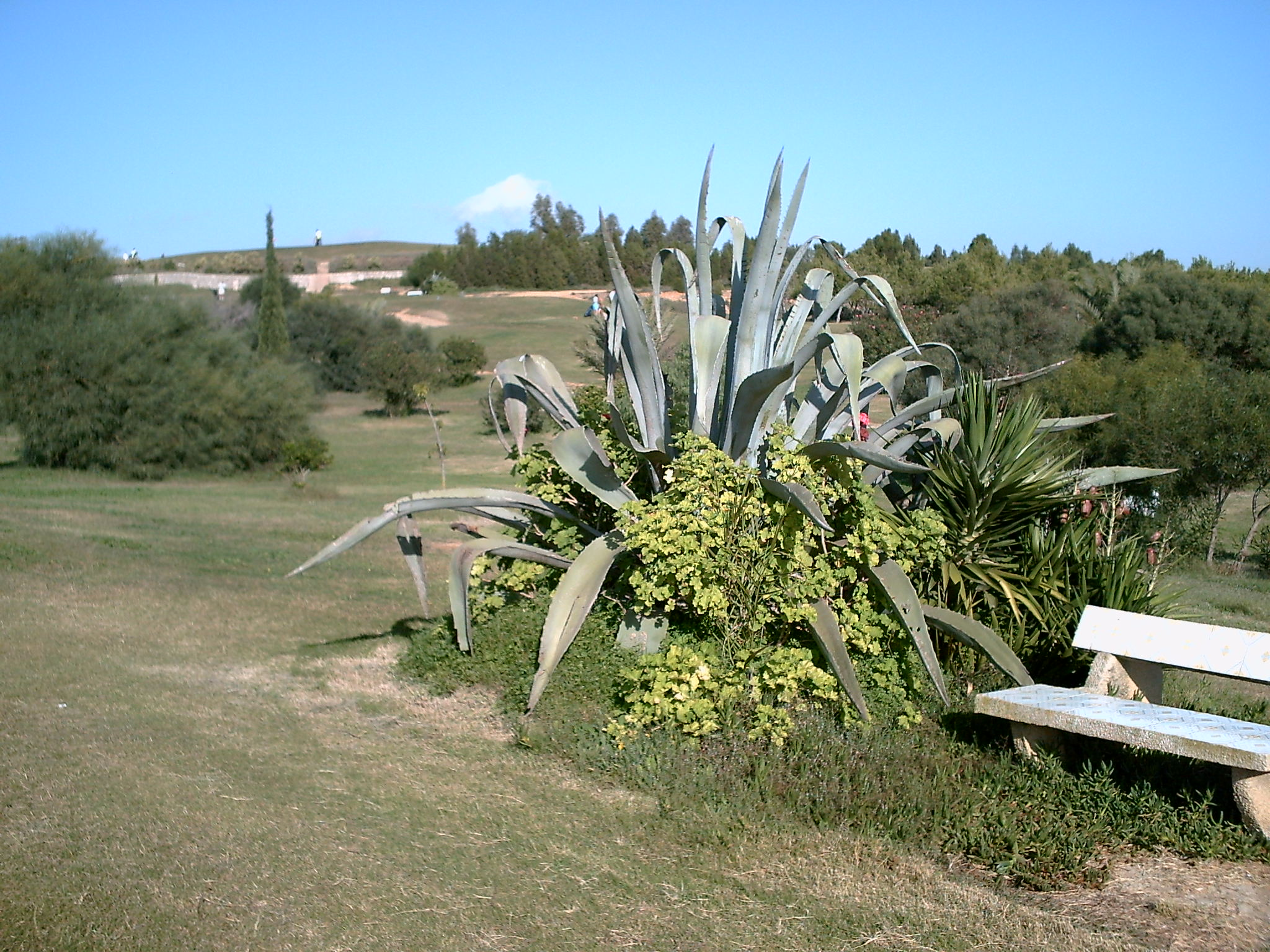
Agave deserti, a plant native to the Yuma Desert

Vegetation is dominated by the creosote bush (Larrea tridentata), which is widespread. The saguaro cactus (Carnegiea gigantea) and the ocotillo (Fouquieria splendens) are common on the bajadas, while many of the desert trees found are restricted to dry watercourses; these include paloverde (Parkinsonia), the desert willow (Chilopsis linearis), desert ironwood (Olneya tesota), and smoke trees (Psorothamnus spinosus).

The Yuma desert is the northern edge of the distributions of the elephant tree (Bursera microphylla) and the blue Baja lily (Triteleiopsis palmeri).

== Fauna ==
Main articles in: Category: Fauna of the Sonoran Desert

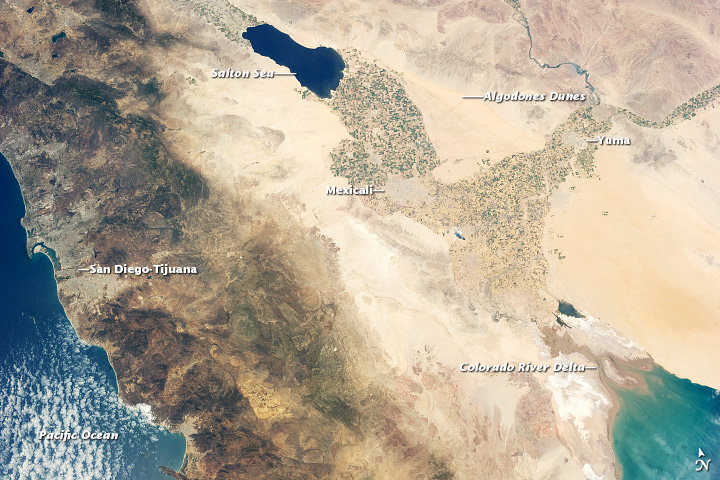
The region from orbit

== See also ==
- Chihuahuan Desert
- Lechuguilla Desert
- Tule Desert (Arizona)
