= Kofa =

Kofa may refer to:

- Kofa National Wildlife Refuge, established in Arizona in 1939 to protect desert bighorn sheep
- Korean Film Archive, also known as the Korean Federation of Film Archives, founded in Seoul in 1974
- Kofa Mountains, a mountain range in Southwest Arizona named for the King of Arizona gold mine
- Kofa High School, a public secondary school in Yuma, Arizona
- KOFA (AM), a radio station (1320 AM) licensed to serve Yuma, Arizona, United States
