= Black Dome (Arizona) =

Landform in Yuma County, Arizona

- Location within Arizona

Highest point
- Elevation: 2,239 ft (682 m) NAVD 88
- Prominence: 646 ft (197 m)
- Coordinates: 33°08′45″N 113°48′34″W

Geography
- Location: Yuma County, Arizona, U.S.
- Parent range: Tank Mountains
- Topo map: USGS Engesser Pass

Black Dome is the second highest point on the west end of the Tank Mountains, located in the northwestern Sonoran Desert in northeastern Yuma County, Arizona, and 57 miles (92 km) east northeast of the city of Yuma, Arizona.

The western two-thirds of the Tank Mountains, including Black Dome, are located in the Kofa National Wildlife Refuge which is managed by the U.S. Fish and Wildlife Service. The east–west trending Tank Mountains lie next to the Kofa Mountains to the northwest.

== See also ==
- Kofa National Wildlife Refuge
