= George Fuller Miller Sr. =

American non-profit executive

George Fuller Miller, Sr.
- Born: March 18, 1903; Indianapolis, Indiana
- Died: June 18, 1980 (aged 77); Lakeside, Arizona
- Education: Colorado State Agriculture College
- Occupation: Non-profit Executive
- Spouse: Margaret (Peggy) McBride

George Fuller Miller Sr. (March 19, 1903 – June 18, 1980) was a long-time Boy Scouts of America executive, the recipient of the Distinguished Eagle Scout Award and a founding father of the American Humanics Foundation.

== Early life and education ==
Miller was born in Indianapolis, on March 18, 1903 to parents Charles Frederick Miller and Gertrude Fuller Miller. In 1915, he joined the Boy Scouts of America and eventually earned the Eagle Scout Award. At age 12, after his parents separated, he lived in various cities in the Western United States, including Denver, Colorado

From 1919 to 1923, he attended Colorado State Agriculture College at Fort Collins, Colorado, where he was enrolled as an agriculture technical vocational student. Miller was on the staff of the school newspaper, The Hornet, where he served one year as business manager and one year as editor-in-chief.

In summer 1926, while attending a Scout conference on Coronado Island, California, Miller met his future wife, Margaret (Peggy) McBride. They married in Hollywood, California, on December 18, 1926.

== Scouting career ==
Miller had joined the Boy Scouts in 1915, and received his Eagle Scout award in 1922 and is a Distinguished Eagle Scout In 1923 he obtained his first position related to Scouting, as Recreation Director for the United Verde Copper Company, with a primary responsibility being to organize Scouting in the area. He was appointed Deputy Field Commissioner of Yavapai-Mohave Council in August 1924 and he organized Scout troops in the Verde Valley using a book called Community Boy Leadership as his guide. He became a professional employee of the Boy Scouts of America, in 1925 as Deputy Regional Executive for Region XII. He became Scout Executive in Marysville, California, in 1926. In the fall of 1927 he transferred to Region IV of the Boy Scouts of America. His job was to organize new councils in Ohio, Kentucky, and West Virginia.

In 1928 he became the Scout Executive of the Roosevelt Council in Phoenix, Arizona. When Miller arrived there were six troops and 389 Scouts in the Roosevelt Council. He served as Scout Executive for 40 years. By the time of his retirement in 1968, the council had grown to 846 units and more than 27,000 Scouters. During those 40 years, more than 178,000 boys were involved in scouting in the Roosevelt Council.

In 1936, Miller worked with Frederick Russell Burnham, a cofounder of Scouting, on a statewide campaign to save the Desert Bighorn Sheep from probable extinction. Several other prominent Arizonans and wildlife conservation societies joined the movement and a save the bighorns poster contest was started in schools throughout the state. The contest-winning bighorn emblem was made up into neckerchief slides for the 10,000 Boy Scouts, and talks and dramatizations were given at school assemblies and on radio, and the Desert Bighorn Sheep became the official mascot for the Arizona Boy Scouts. These efforts culminated in the establishment in 1939 of two Bighorn game ranges in Arizona: Kofa National Wildlife Refuge and Cabeza Prieta National Wildlife Refuge.

Another of Miller's achievements was the building of the Heard Scout Pueblo at the base of South Mountain land donated by Dwight B. Heard. He subsequently supervised the building of Camp Geronimo on Tonto Creek in the early 1930s, three Scout ranches east of Payson, Arizona, in the 1940s, and the Scouting Center in Phoenix, which was completed in 1950. In 1955 he moved the old Camp Geronimo facility to a larger site at the Spade Ranch on Webber Creek near Pine, Arizona.

== Civic activities ==
In Maricopa County, he was a member of Citizens' Task Force on Crime in 1963 and a member of the Crime Commission. He served as Director of Community Resources for the Samaritan Health Service from 1968 to 1971. He was a member of the Phoenix City Council elected in 1969 and serving from 1970 to 1971.

Miller was a Rotarian for 50 years and was president of the Phoenix 100 Rotary Club from 1949 to 1950. Miller, along with H. Roe Bartle, was one of the founding fathers of the American Humanics Foundation and he served on the first Board of Directors. In 1980, the Phoenix 100 Rotary Club provided funds to establish the American Humanics program at Arizona State University. In Miller's honor, the George F. Miller Chapter of the American Humanics was formed at ASU.

Miller was instrumental in founding and development of Arizona Boys Ranch, dedicated in 1952, to provide a home to troubled youth. The Ranch was dedicated in 1952.

He wrote a weekly column for the Phoenix Gazette from April 1964 to April 1968.

== Honors ==
- Honorary Doctor of Law, Arizona State University, 1965
- The National Foundation of Christians and Jews - Human Relations Award, March 1966 for leadership in civic affairs and service to youth.
- 12 Who Care - Hon Kachina Award, 1980.
- The first "Good Scout Award," 1980.

== See also ==
- List of Eagle Scouts
