= Tank Mountains =

Landform in Yuma County, Arizona

- Location within Arizona

Highest point
- Peak: Courthouse Mountain
- Elevation: 735 m (2,411 ft)
- Coordinates: 33°12′10″N 113°51′00″W

Geography
- Country: United States
- State: Arizona
- Range coordinates: 33°09′32″N 113°42′27″W

The Tank Mountains (Yavapai: Hakimatava) are a mountain range in the Sonoran Desert of southwest Arizona; the range is part of the southeastern border of the Kofa National Wildlife Refuge.

The Tank Mountains are east–west trending and about 14 miles (23 km) long. The highest peak is Courthouse Mountain on the west end of the range at 2,411 feet (735 m). Black Dome also on the west end of the range is at 2,236 feet (682 m) and two minor peaks of 1,568 feet (478 m) and 1,391 feet (424 m) flank the east end of the range separated by an alluvial valley. The western two thirds of the mountains lie in the Kofa National Wildlife Refuge and connect to the southeast corner of the Kofa Mountains where the Kofa Butte (3,247 feet (990 m)) is located, across Engesser Pass.

The Tank Mountains abut the Palomas Mountains on the south, which are also partly in the wildlife refuge. North, east, and southeast of the Tank Mountains lies the extensive Palomas Plain which drains southeasterly towards Hyder and the Gila River valley. To the northeast across the Palomas Plain lies the Little Horn Mountains and the adjacent Eagletail Mountains Wilderness. To the southwest is the southeast draining King Valley with the Castle Dome Mountains beyond.

The closest access points to the Tank Mountains on the south and east is Hyder, by way of the communities of Dateland and Sentinel on Interstate 8.

== See also ==
- List of mountain ranges of Yuma County, Arizona
- List of mountain ranges of Arizona
