= Eagle Crags (California) =

Mountain summit in California, United States

- Eagle Crag Mountains
- Location within California

Highest point
- Elevation: 1,675 m (5,495 ft)
- Coordinates: 35.3990565°N 117.0605379°W

Geography
- Country: United States
- State: California
- Region: Mojave Desert
- District: San Bernardino County
- Range coordinates: 35°23′56.6″N 117°3′37.94″W
- Topo map: USGS Eagle Crags

Geology
- Rock type: volcanic

Eagle Crags is a summit in the Mojave Desert, San Bernardino County, California, within Naval Air Weapons Station China Lake, off limits to the public. The elevation is 5496 feet. It is marked on the USGS topographic map named Eagle Crags. It is 9.3 miles east of Pilot Knob, 8.7 miles southeast of Robbers Mountain, 10.7 miles northeast of Slocum Mountain, 27 miles west of the central base of Fort Irwin National Training Center.

== Geology ==
Eagle Crags is part of the Eagle Crags Volcanic Field and was the subject of a dissertation. Andrew Sabin summarizes that the area ″is underlain by Mesozoic granites, Tertiary age volcanic rocks, pyroclastic flows and Quaternary alluvium.″ The presence of some ephemeral hot springs suggests that the area may be a source of geothermal power. The area is composed primarily of felsic volcanic rocks.

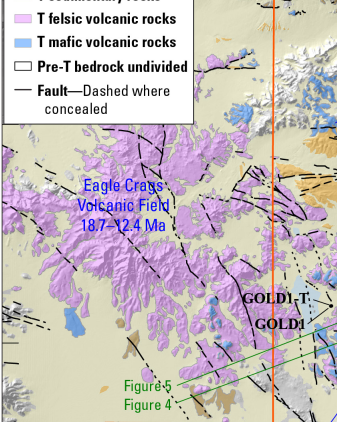
Map of the Eagle Crags Volcanic Field, showing felsic volcanic rocks

== Fauna ==
Desert Bighorn Sheep were brought to Eagle Crags in the 1980s; in 2005 a study was done to evaluate the possibility of bringing more ewes.
