= Palomas Mountains =

Mountain range in Yuma County, Arizona, USA

- Location within Arizona

Highest point
- Elevation: 1,887 ft (575 m)
- Coordinates: 33°00′52″N 113°38′06″W

Geography
- Country: United States
- State: Arizona
- County: Yuma
- Range coordinates: 33°00′51.9″N 113°38′6.6″W

The Palomas Mountains (Yavapai: Hakiñur) is a mountain range in the Sonoran Desert of southwest Arizona. Palomas is the Spanish word for white-winged doves which were found in the settlement of Palomas in the 1890's.

The range is found around 70 mi (110 km) NE of Yuma, Arizona, and around 15 mi (24 km) north of the town of Dateland, in eastern Yuma County. Over a narrow valley toward the north are the Tank Mountains, which frame a nonstop belt of bedrock west into the Kofa Mountains. Toward the west lies Neversweat Ridge, the easternmost known presentation of Orocopia Schist. Toward the east and northeast is the Palomas Plain, and toward the south is the Gila River. Accessibility to the range is by and large great. A large portion of the dirt roads are in great condition and can be partly crossed by a two-wheel drive vehicle. In any case, since they cross numerous sandy washes the streets are passable only with a four-wheel drive vehicle. The western portion of the range is within the Yuma Proving Ground and consent must be acquired before entering.

== See also ==
- List of mountain ranges of Yuma County, Arizona
- List of mountain ranges of Arizona
