= Schiff Scout Reservation =

Schiff Scout Reservation may refer the following Boy Scouts of America locations:

- Mortimer L. Schiff Scout Reservation, in Mendham, New Jersey
- John M. Schiff Scout Reservation, in Wading River, New York
