= Izaak Walton League =

U.S. environmental organization

Izaak Walton League of America
- Abbreviation: IWLA
- Formation: 1922
- Type: Nonprofit environmental organization
- Purpose: Conservation of natural resources and promotion of outdoor recreation
- Headquarters: Gaithersburg, Maryland, United States
- Region served: United States
- Publication: Outdoor America
- Website: www.iwla.org

The Izaak Walton League of America is an American environmental organization founded in 1922 that promotes the protection of natural resources and encourages outdoor recreation. The organization was established in Chicago, Illinois, by a group of sportsmen who wished to protect fishing opportunities for future generations. They named the League after seminal fishing enthusiast Izaak Walton (1593–1683), known as the "Father of Flyfishing" and author of The Compleat Angler. Advertising executive Williamson H. Dilg became its first president and promoter. The first conservation organization with a mass membership, the League had over 100,000 supporters by 1924. An early result of their efforts was the establishment of the Upper Mississippi River National Wildlife and Fish Refuge in 1924.

The League led efforts in the 1930s for clean water legislation. It achieved initial success with the passage of the Federal Water Pollution Control Act in 1948 and the Federal Water Pollution Control Act in 1956. Its major victory came with the passage of the Clean Water Act of 1972. The League continues to advocate for the preservation of wetlands and protection of wilderness areas, as well as for soil and water conservation.

The League's membership declined in the 1960s to a stable level of around 50,000. The organization retains a firm base of conservationists and anglers nationwide, with more than 200 chapters. The League publishes a quarterly magazine, Outdoor America, which covers the League's activities and the environment.

== Accomplishments ==
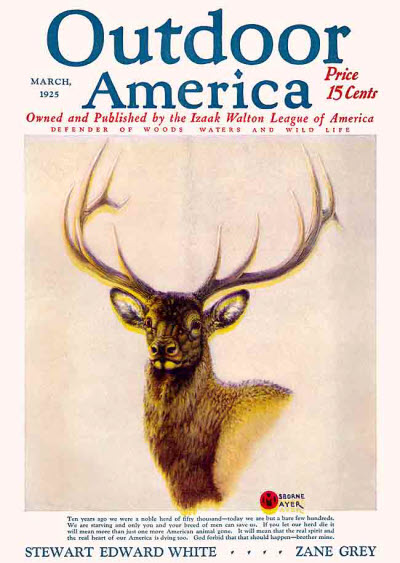
March 1925 issue of Outdoor America, a now-quarterly magazine published by the Izaak Walton League

In the 1920s, the League helped save the now-thriving Jackson Hole elk herd by purchasing several thousand acres in Wyoming to provide food and range for the herd. To protect against the overfishing of bass, the League worked to enact the Black Bass Act of 1926, which expanded the Lacey Act to prohibit the illegal shipment of fish across state lines.

In the 1930s, the League collaborated with the noted conservationist Frederick Russell Burnham and the Arizona Boy Scouts to save the bighorn sheep. These efforts led to the establishment in 1939 of two bighorn game ranges in Arizona: Kofa National Wildlife Refuge and Cabeza Prieta National Wildlife Refuge. To prevent damming and flooding portions of the Superior National Forest, known now as the Boundary Waters Canoe Area Wilderness in Minnesota, the League helped draft and pass a federal law in 1930 to prevent the damming.

In the 1940s, the Izaak Walton League of America raised concerns about the pesticide DDT and played an integral part in protecting the Jackson Hole National Monument from the cattle industry in Teton County. They also helped to support the transition of the monument into Grand Teton National Park.

In 1952, the Izaak Walton League in Oregon initiated the "Keep America Beautiful - Don't be a Litterbug" campaign. The ideas was inspired by Jeanne Moment and her husband Samuel Moment to highlight the problems of garbage accumulating outside of towns and the increasing number of motorists littering the roadsides. Backed by members of the Izaak Walton League, they launched an educational campaign in Oregon "to teach Litterbugs and Vandalbugs to stop acting like pigs" along with initiatives that included automakers to include trash receptacles in their cars, paper bags at fuel stations so motorists and service attendants can dispose trash, and pushing for public funding for installing trash cans and to empty them regularly.

In May 1973, the League sued the U.S. Department of Agriculture over the clear cut logging of Monongahela National Forest in West Virginia as being contrary to the law, which stated in part, "only dead, physically mature, and large growth trees individually marked for cutting" could be sold. The US District Court ruled in favor of the League. The ruling was appealed; on August 21, 1975, the Fourth Court of Appeals upheld the lower court's decision. The ramifications of this local decision for forestry and the timber industry nationally led to efforts to repeal the Organic Act. This resulted in a new law passed by Congress: the National Forest Management Act of 1976, which repealed significant portions of the Organic Act.

Its Save Our Streams (SOS) program involves activists in all fifty states in monitoring water quality. In 2018, the League introduced Salt Watch, a volunteer water monitoring program designed to detect high levels of chloride in waterways. That program also works with private citizens, local governments, and landscape companies to reduce the use of salt as a de-icer on roads, parking lots, and sidewalks. In 2023, the League introduced Nitrate Watch, a national program to test waterways and drinking water for high levels of nitrate, which is linked to cancer and certain birth defects.

The Columbus Izaak Walton League Lodge, in Columbus, Nebraska, is listed on the National Register of Historic Places.

== Notable chapters ==
- IWLA Diana Chapter (1948)

== See also ==
- Environmental history of the United States
