= Scouting in Arizona =

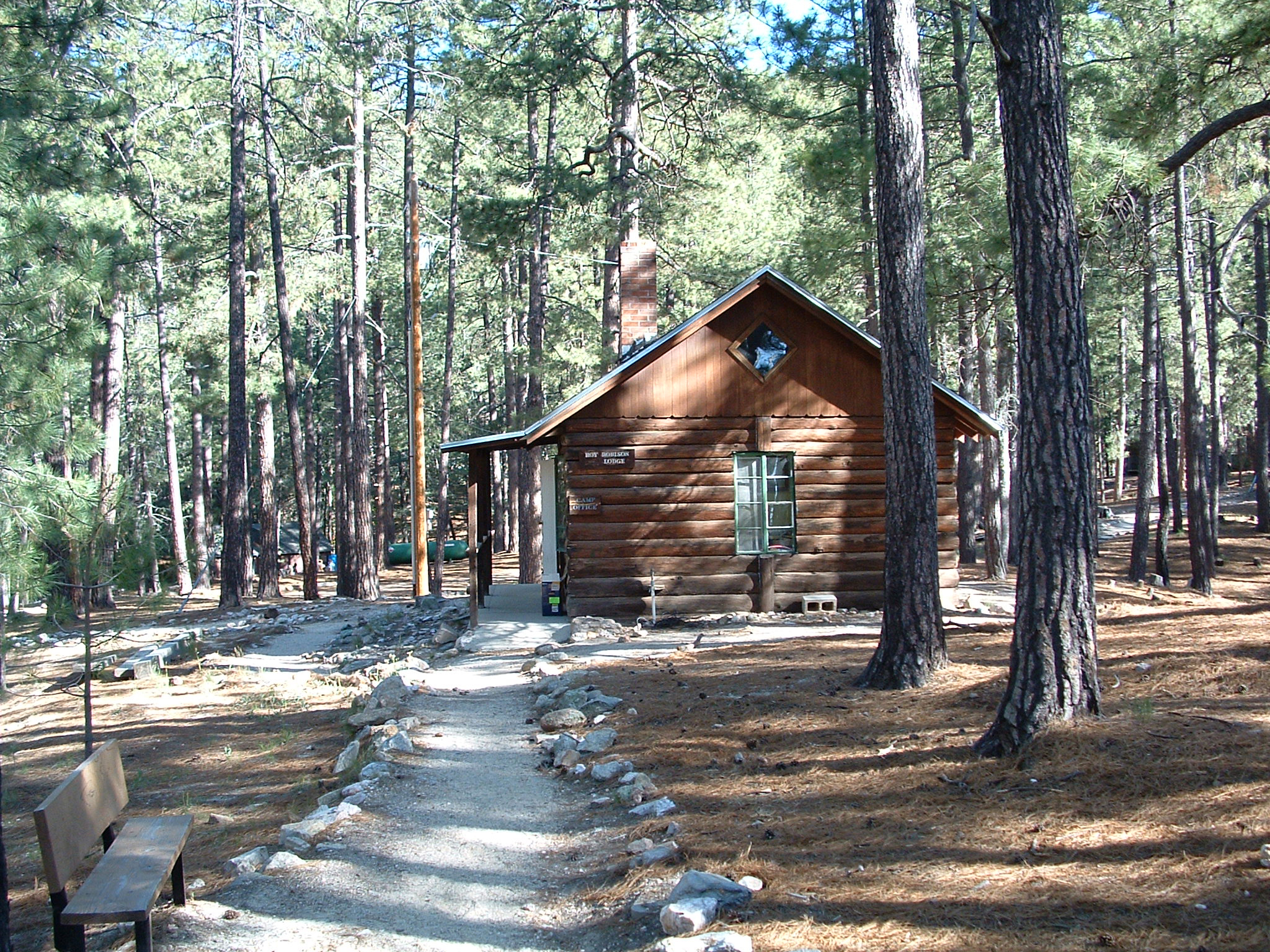
- Camp Lawton

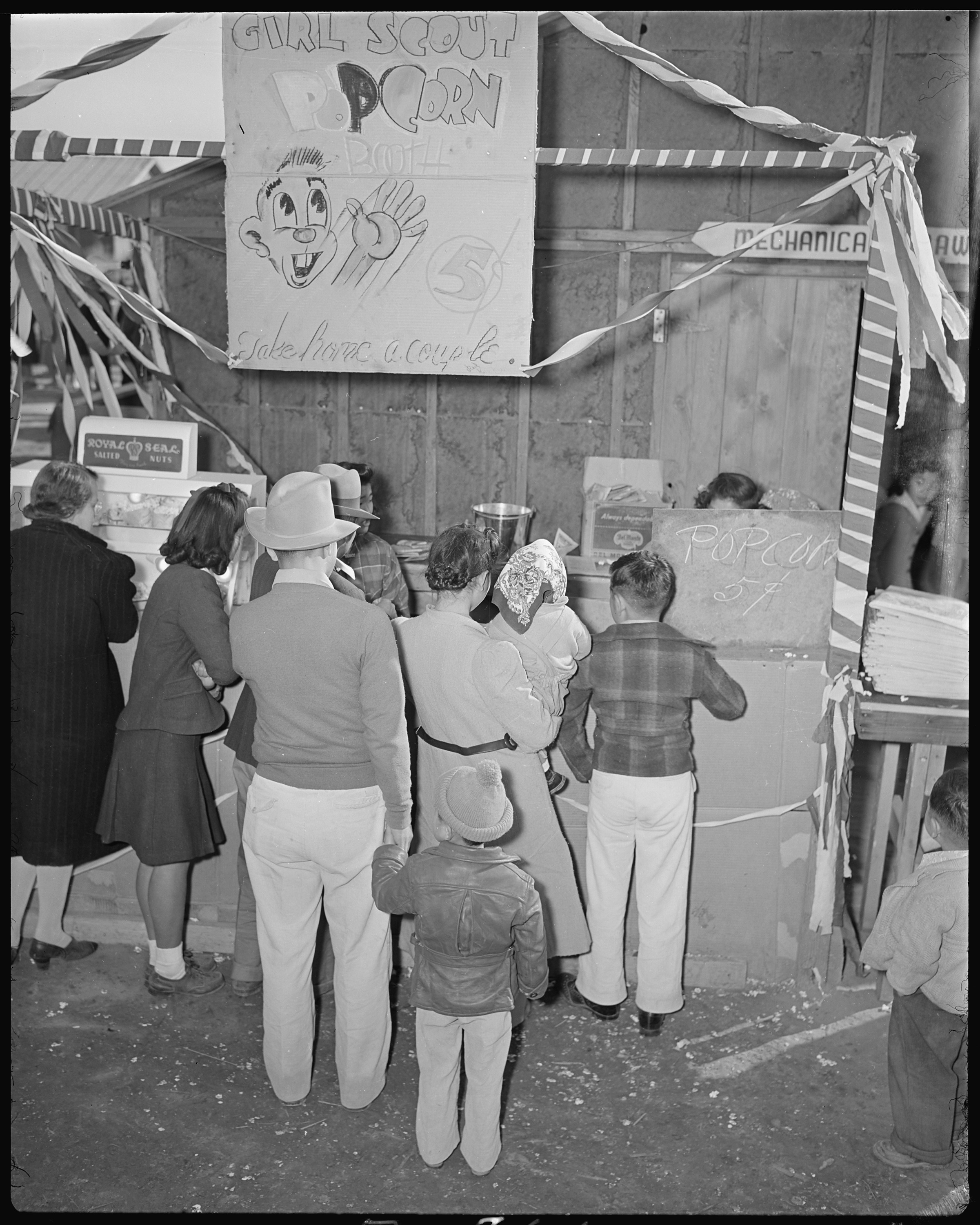
- Popcorn stand run by Girl Scouts at the New Year's Fair in Poston, Arizona

Scouting in Arizona has a history starting from the 1910s to the present day, serving youth in programs that suit the environment in which they live.

== Early history ==
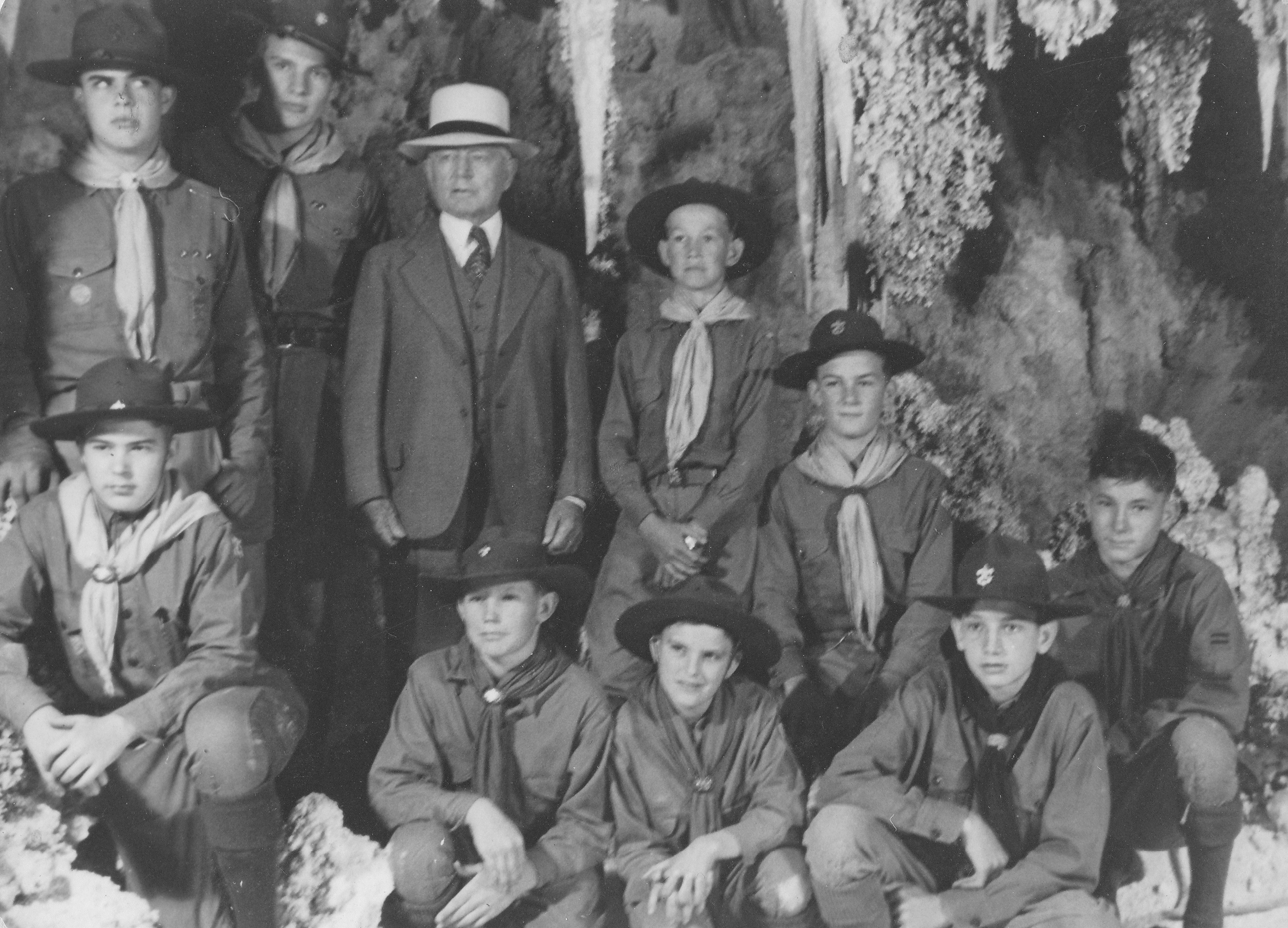
Major Burnham with BSA Troop, Carlsbad Caverns, 1941

Boy Scouting was founded by Robert Baden-Powell in England and co-founded by the American Scout Major Frederick Russell Burnham. Boy Scouting was brought to the United States by William D. Boyce. He incorporated the Boy Scouts of America on February 8, 1910. The Boy Scouts of America was chartered by Congress on June 15, 1916. This is the same year as the first Boy Scout Council in Arizona was formed with the Prescott Council. Burnham served as the Honorary President of the Arizona Boy Scouts throughout the 1940s until his death in 1947.

The first two Boy Scout troops in Arizona Territory were organized in Prescott, in September 1910 and in Tombstone at almost the same time. In Prescott, E.P. Cole of Whipple Barracks was the first Scoutmaster. Arizona Territorial Historian Sharlot Hall was an honorary member of the Tombstone troop. Scouting came to Phoenix in the fall 1910 with Clarence R. Craig as the Scoutmaster. Other Scout troops were formed; in Bisbee in early 1911. and in St. Joseph and Snowflake about the same time.

Harold Steele, principal of the then new Tucson High School, organized the first Scout troop in Tucson on April 20, 1911.

On November 29, 1911 The Church of Jesus Christ of Latter-day Saints (LDS Church) organized the MIA Scouts along the lines recommended by the Boy Scouts of America as part of their Mutual Improvement Association youth program. In March 1912, the LDS Church published their first lessons for the MIA Scouts in the Improvement Era. On May 21, 1913, the LDS Church was invited by the Boy Scout National Council to become the first Chartered Sponsored Organization in their movement. The Boy Scouts of America program was then adopted in all LDS Church congregations as part of their youth program. Each LDS Church congregation in Arizona organized a Scout troop.

In April 1921 the eight LDS troops in the Maricopa (LDS) Stake and the Methodist troop met in at the Coffee Cup in Mesa to organize the Apache Council. This was the second council in Arizona. George A. Johnson was the first Council President. Edwin M. LeBaron was the first Field Commissioner. Their first summer camp was held on Sycamore Creek near Payson, Arizona.

On September 16, 1921, the board of the Apache Council met with Scouters from Phoenix at the Tempe National Bank to reorganized into the Roosevelt Council, to be headquartered in Phoenix. Tim Murray from Galveston Texas, was the first professional Scout Executive. The 1922 summer camp was at Pineair (now call Reavis Ranch located in the Superstition Wilderness Area about 45 miles (72 km) east of Mesa). The name, Camp Geronimo, is still used by the Grand Canyon Council camp although the location has changed several times. Throughout the 1940s, Frederick Russell Burnham served as the Honorary President of the Roosevelt Council Boy Scouts.

The Roosevelt Council changed its name to the Theodore Roosevelt Council. In 1993 the Theodore Roosevelt Council (located in Phoenix) and the Grand Canyon Council (located in Flagstaff) merged with the Phoenix council assuming the current name, the Grand Canyon Council. The Nassau County Council in New York was renamed to the Theodore Roosevelt Council in 1997.

=== Campaign to Save the Bighorn Sheep ===
In 1936, Boy Scouts in Arizona mounted a statewide campaign to save the Bighorn Sheep. The Scouts first became interested in the sheep through the efforts of Major Frederick Russell Burnham. Burnham observed that fewer than 150 of these sheep still lived in the Arizona mountains. He called George F. Miller, then Scout Executive of the Phoenix Scout Council, with a plan to save the sheep. Burnham said,

I want you to save this majestic animal, not only because it is in danger of extinction, but of more importance, some day it might provide domestic sheep with a strain to save them from disaster at the hands of a yet unknown virus.

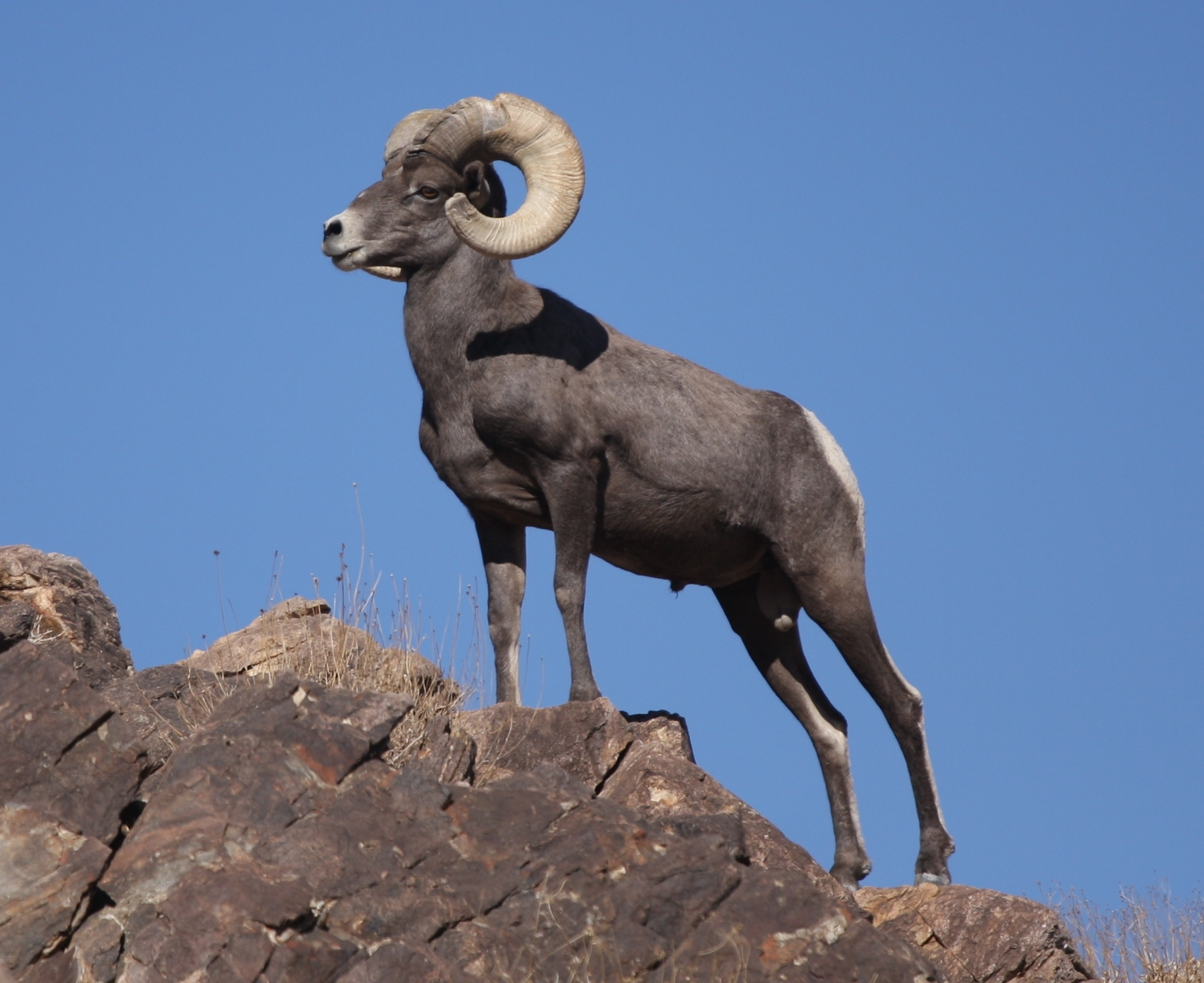
Desert Bighorn Sheep

Several other prominent Arizonans join the movement and a save the bighorns poster contest was started in schools throughout the state. Burnham provided prizes and appeared in store windows across Arizona. The contest-winning bighorn emblem was made up into neckerchief slides for the 10,000 Boy Scouts, and talks and dramatizations were given at school assemblies and on radio. The National Wildlife Federation, the Izaak Walton League, and the Audubon Society also joined the effort.

These efforts led to the establishment of two bighorn game ranges in Arizona: Kofa National Wildlife Refuge and Cabeza Prieta National Wildlife Refuge. On January 18, 1939, over 1,500,000 acres (6,100 km^{2}) were set aside and a civilian conservation corp side camp was set up to develop high mountain waterholes for the sheep. The Desert Bighorn Sheep is now the official mascot for Arizona Boy Scouts.

== Today ==
There are two Boy Scouts of America (BSA) local councils in Arizona, and other multi-state councils that serve portions of Arizona:

=== Catalina Council ===
Catalina Council (#011)
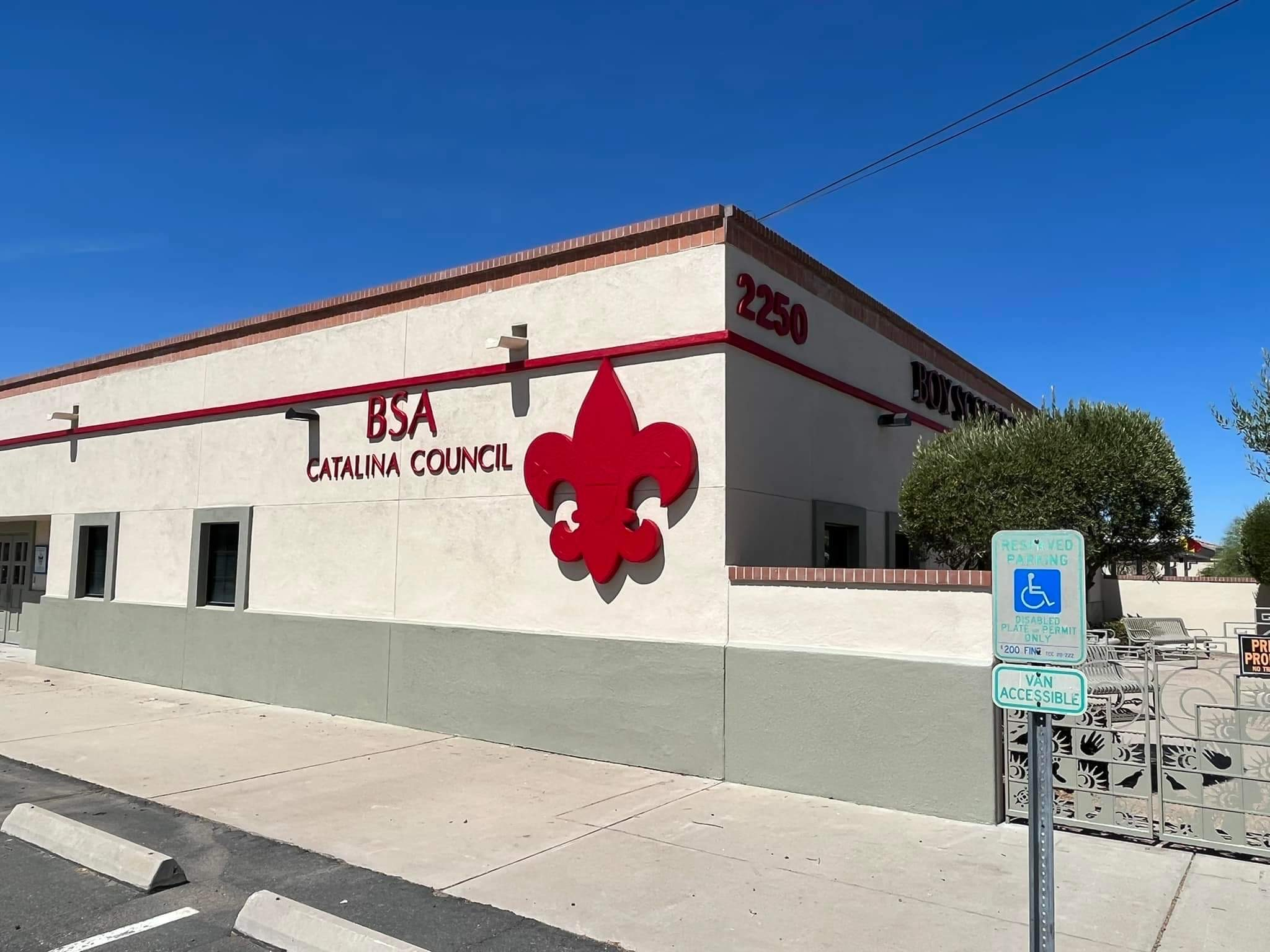
- Catalina Council headquarters
- Owner: Boy Scouts of America
- Headquarters: Tucson, Arizona
- Country: United States
- President: Don Riegger, Jr. CPA
- Council Commissioner: Jonathan Lang
- Scout Executive: Dr. Shannon Roberts, PhD
- Website catalinacouncil.org

Catalina Council, BSA serves the southeastern portion of Arizona, from Ajo, Arizona to the US-Mexico border in the south, and all the way east to the New Mexico border. Catalina Council is headquartered in Tucson, Arizona, has two Districts, and two camps.

In 1920, the Tucson Council (#011) was formed, changing its name to Catalina Council (#011) in 1922. The Cochise County Council (#008), founded in 1922, merged with the Catalina Council in 1963.

==== Districts ====
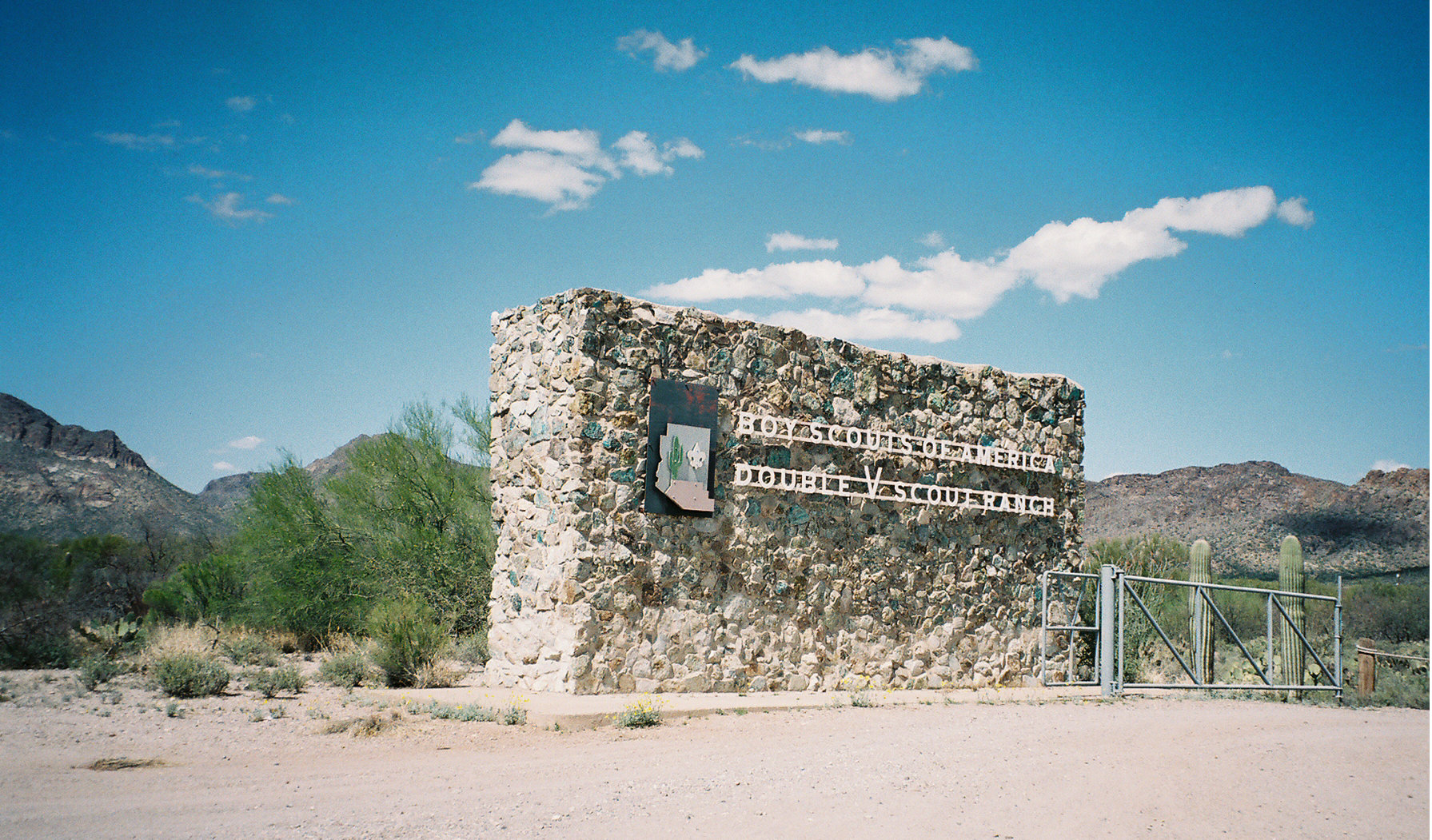
Double V Scout Ranch's gateway

The council is divided into districts which serve Scouting units directly.

- Cochise District – Santa Cruz, Cochise, and eastern portion of Pima Counties
- Sky Islands District – Southern Pinal County and western Pima County

==== Camps ====
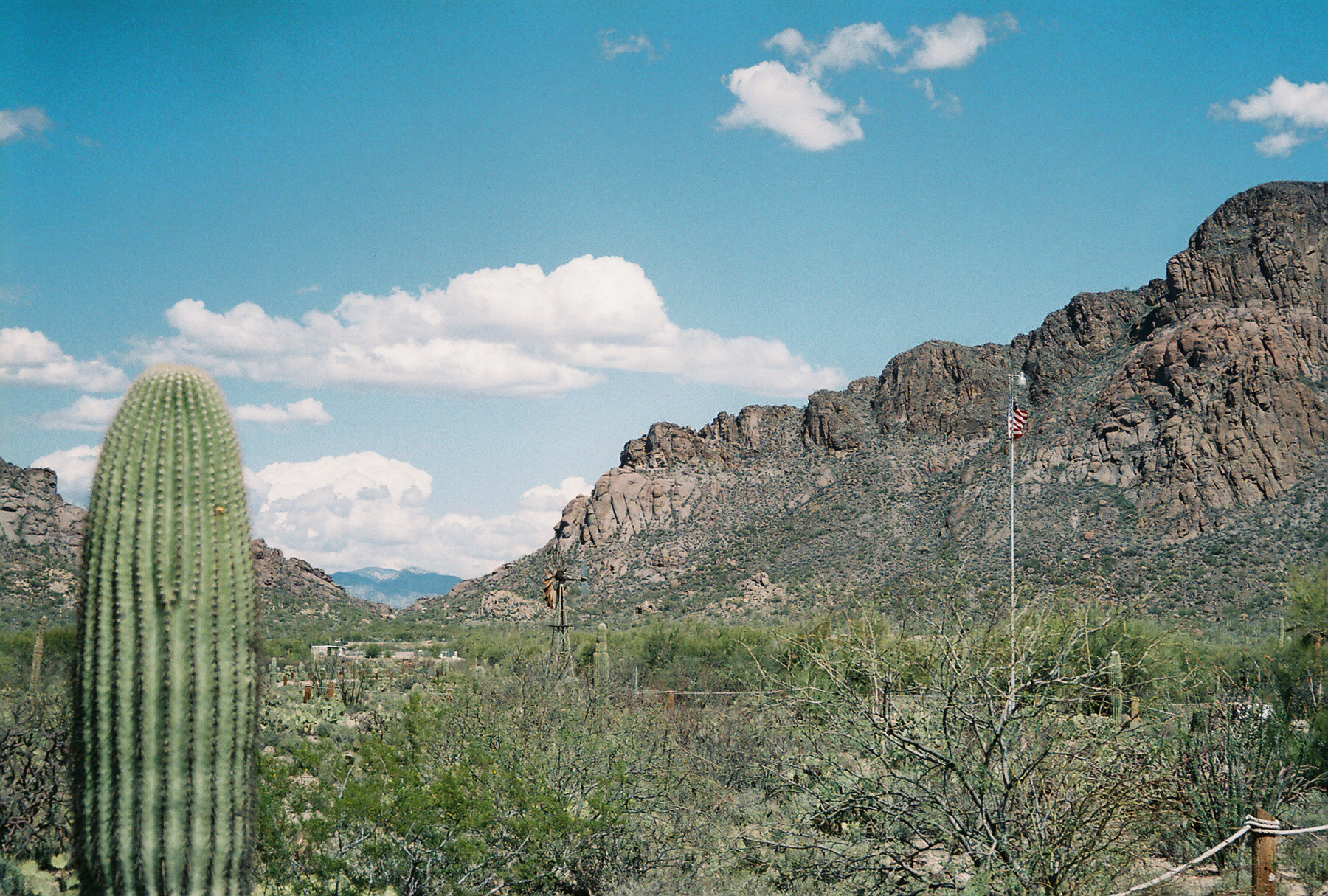
The "Indian Chief's" profile (above windmill) on Cat Mountain, overlooking Double V Scout Ranch

- Camp Lawton Scout Camp has been leased from the National Forest Service since 1921 and has been continuously operated by the Catalina Council. It is located in the Santa Catalina mountains outside of Tucson, Arizona.
- Double V Scout Ranch is located on South Kinney Road six miles (10 km) southwest of Tucson, near Tucson Mountain Park's Cat Mountain. The 360-acre (146 ha) ranch was acquired on a long-term lease from the Bureau of Land Management in 1969. It is used for both Cub Scout and Boy Scout camping and events. Improvements include a large stone ramada equipped with picnic tables, restrooms, and water misters for cooling. The ranch also has an Olympic-size swimming pool. A natural formation on the northwest side of adjacent Cat Mountain visible from the ranch is called the "Indian chief" because of its strong resemblance to an Indian's profile. Scenes from the 1970s television series Petrocelli were filmed at the ranch.

=== Grand Canyon Council ===
Grand Canyon Council (#010)
- Owner: Boy Scouts of America
- Headquarters: Phoenix, Arizona
- Country: United States
- President: Lisa Graham Keegan (01/2019 – Current)
- Council Commissioner: Jacob R. Benyi (01/2020 – Current)
- Scout Executive: Andy Price (10/2018 – Current)
- Website grandcanyonbsa.org

The Grand Canyon Council serves Scouts in Arizona and New Mexico, offering Cub Scouts and Scouts BSA to boys and girls ages 5 through 18. Additionally ages 14 through 21 can be involved with Venturing, a high adventure outdoor program or in Learning for Life, a career-based program.

In 1916, the Globe Council was founded, ending in 1919. In 1925, the Verde Council (#0715) was founded. It merged into the Yavapai-Mohave Council in 1927.

In 1921, the Phoenix Council (#010) was founded, changing its name to the Maricopa County Council (#010) in 1923. The Maricopa County council changed its name to the Roosevelt Council in 1924. In 1922, the Yavapai District was founded, changing its name to the Yavapai & Mohave Counties Council (#012) in 1924. In 1926, Yavapai and Mohave Counties changed its name to Yavapai-Mohave Council (#012). In 1922, the Grand Canyon Council was founded. It merged into Yavapai-Mohave in 1929. The combined councils changed their names to the Northern Arizona Council. In 1934, the council was disbanded and service was taken over by Direct Service.

The Three G Council (#009) was formed in 1943, changing its name to the Copper Council in 1962. In 1977, the Copper Council merged into the Theodore Roosevelt Council (#010). In 1993, the Theodore Roosevelt Council reformed into Grand Canyon Council (#010). Note that this is unrelated to Theodore Roosevelt Council (#386), previously known as Nassau County Council, located in New York. That Council took their current name in 1997.

==== Organization ====
In 2017, Grand Canyon Council underwent a realignment, reducing the number of districts to six Community Districts. Districts are:

Districts

- Central District
- Gila River District – Ahwatukee, Casa Grande, Chandler, Maricopa, Tempe, South Phoenix, and Yuma.
- Lost Dutchman District
- Ponderosa District – Prescott, Prescott Valley, Chino Valley, Verde Valley, Williams, Flagstaff, Winslow, Holbrook, Page.
- Pinnacle Peak District
- Sonoran Sunset District

==== Camps ====
- Camp Raymond is located 30 miles (48 km) outside of Flagstaff, Arizona, between the Kaibab National Forest and the Coconino National Forest, along the rim of Sycamore Canyon. Camp Raymond has 18 campsites and offers a variety of program areas, including Boy Scout Resident Camp during the summer, with 9 program areas and 31 merit badges. For older Scouts, Camp Raymond offers C.O.P.E, Climbing, and Mountain Biking. The camp is named after Dr. R.O. Raymond, one of the first doctors in Flagstaff, Arizona, and the founder of the Raymond Educational Foundation. Dr. Raymond, along with many other community leaders, had the idea to create a permanent summer camp in northern Arizona. The 160-acre (0.65 km^{2}) site was purchased in April 1964 for $200 an acre. A Camp Development Committee was formed under the leadership of William Preston as soon as the purchase was finalized. They worked quickly to resolve water and sanitation concerns and opened the camp in the summer of 1964. The next big push for development at Camp Raymond was in the 1970s, when the Ranger house and Quartermaster-Trading Post building were constructed. The Handicraft shed and handicap shower facilities were added in 1988, the pool in 1990 and a lake in 2009. Today, Camp Raymond has 18 campsites, each with a wash stand, latrine, cooking area, picnic tables, and running water. Camp Raymond is available for Boy Scout Troops and Cub Scout Packs for Troop Camping, Family Camping and District Camporees. Camp Raymond has an Archery Range and Shooting Range, including rifle and shotgun skeet ranges.
- Camp Geronimo – Located between Payson, Arizona and Pine, Arizona, near the Mogollon Rim. Camp Geronimo recently celebrated its 50th year at the camp's current location at the confluence of East and West Webber Creeks. It incorporates the former Spade Ranch house along with extensive camping and recreational facilities. Camp Geronimo is owned and operated by the Grand Canyon Council.

Camp Geronimo sits on 200 acres (0.81 km^{2}) of forest and meadows, and is surrounded by over 5,000 acres (20 km^{2}) of ponderosa pine forest at the edge of the Colorado Plateau. It primarily serves as a one-week summer camp for Scouts BSA, but also has limited accommodations for families to stay the summer in cabins.

The camp has 29 campsites, three chapels, a lake, craft lodge, obstacle course, swimming pool, climbing tower (Temporary), nature lodge, dining hall, rifle range, Low C.O.P.E. program, archery range, and a muzzleloading range. Every area has a department that teaches classes over the summer. Scouts enrolled in the summer program are able to take four classes at the camp, and can earn merit badges with their achievements.

The Spade Ranch house, located in Camp Geronimo, has been around for over 100 years. Every year during the Scout summer camp, older Scouts participate in high adventure activities. The Spade Ranch house was built by the Spade family on the basis of Webber Creek just beneath the Mogollon Rim. The Spade Ranch house is also the home to the Mogollon Monster story, which is a classic traditionally told for every group of campers that come through each week during the summer camp.

- R-C Scout Ranch is located a half-hour east of Payson. It is the location of R-BOO-C (a Halloween-themed family fun camp), Cub Scout Resident Camp and many training programs. R-C Scout Ranch is available to Boy Scout Troops and Cub Scout Packs for camping, and offers cabins for winter camping.
- The Heard Scout Pueblo is located near 20th Street and Baseline Road in Phoenix, Arizona.The Heard Scout Pueblo hosts the Grand Canyon Council Cub Scout Day Camp every summer, and offers camping opportunities for Cub Scout Packs and Boy Scout Troops.
- Lake Pleasant Camp is an aquatics and nature based camp located at the Desert Outdoor Center at Lake Pleasant 20 miles (32 km) north of central Phoenix in Peoria, Arizona. It is operated in cooperation with the Maricopa County Parks Department.

The Grand Canyon Council also has an Order of the Arrow lodge, Wipala Wiki #432.

=== High Desert Council ===
The High Desert Council of the Boy Scouts of America is headquartered in Albuquerque, New Mexico, and provides Scouting to youth in various parts of New Mexico, Arizona and surrounding states.

=== Las Vegas Area Council ===
Formerly Boulder Dam Area Council, Las Vegas Area Council serves Scouts in Nevada, California and Mohave County, Arizona.

=== San Diego-Imperial Council ===
The San Diego-Imperial Council is headquartered in San Diego, California, and serves youth members and volunteer leaders through Scout units in San Diego and Imperial counties of Southern California, as well as a portion of Arizona. Desert Pacific Council was renamed to San Diego-Imperial Council on January 3, 2005.

== Girl Scouting in Arizona ==
Girl Scouting in Arizona
- Map of Girl Scout Councils in California

There are two Girl Scout councils in Arizona.

In Arizona, Girl Scouts was started in Prescott in 1916 by Maxine Dunning though the first troop in Arizona was not formally recognized until 1918 in Ajo. The Barbara Anderson Girl Scout Museum in Phoenix focuses on Girl Scout history, and in particular, Arizona Girl Scout history.

=== Girl Scouts–Arizona Cactus-Pine Council ===
Girl Scouts–Arizona Cactus-Pine Council
- Headquarters: Phoenix, Arizona
- Country: United States
- Chief Executive Officer: Mary Mitchell and Christina Spicer
- Website girlscoutsaz.org

Girl Scouts-Arizona Cactus-Pine Council serves over 25,000 girls in northern Arizona as well as in the Utah and New Mexico sections of the Navajo Nation and in a small part of California.

==== Camps ====
- Camp Maripai is 80 acres (32 ha) at 6,000 feet (1,800 m) near Prescott, Arizona. It was established in 1942.
- Parsons Leadership Center is 20 acres (8.1 ha) at the base of South Mountain near Phoenix, Arizona
- Camp Stephens is 5 acres (2.0 ha) at 6,100 feet (1,900 m) 10 miles (16 km) east of Kingman, Arizona
- Shadow Rim Ranch is 40 acres (16 ha) at 5,600 feet (1,700 m) in Tonto National Forest near Payson, Arizona
- Willow Springs Program Center is 190 acres (77 ha) at 6,000 feet (1,800 m) in Prescott National Forest

=== Girl Scouts of Southern Arizona ===
Girl Scouts of Southern Arizona
- Headquarters: Tucson, Arizona
- Country: United States
- Chief Executive Officer: Debbie Rich
- Website www.girlscoussoaz.org

Girl Scouts of Southern Arizona council serves more than 14,000 girls in Pima, Cochise, Greenlee, Yuma, and Santa Cruz counties and southern parts of Graham, Maricopa, and Pinal counties. It was previously known as Sahuaro Girl Scout Council.

==== Camps ====
- Whispering Pines Program Center is 16 acres (6.5 ha) on Mount Lemmon in Coronado National Forest
- The Hacienda Program Center in Tucson
- Camp Tucker is a leave no trace camp ground near Rimrock.

== Scouting museums in Arizona ==
- Otis H. Chidester Museum, Tucson, Arizona, azscoutmuseum.com
- Arizona Scouting Museum, www.arizonascoutingmuseum.org
- Barbara Anderson Girl Scout Museum, Phoenix, Arizona
