= IWLA Diana Chapter =

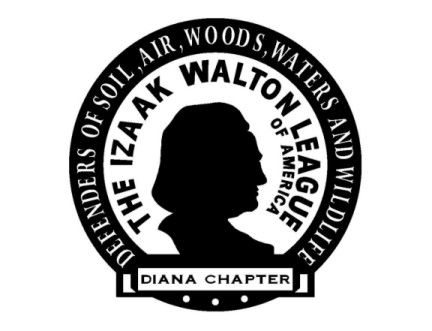

The Diana Chapter, a chapter of the Izaak Walton League of America, was formed exclusively for scientific and educational purposes; to conserve, maintain, protect and restore the soils, woods, waters, wildlife, wetlands and other natural resources of the state of Indiana; to promote means and opportunities for the education of the public with respect to such resources and the enjoyment and wholesale utilization thereof.

With a strong membership of conservationists, sportsmen and outdoor enthusiasts, the Diana Chapter promotes our natural resources through activities such as: Hoosier River Watch, certified Hunter Education classes and cooperative Hunter Recruitment Events with local State Fish & Wildlife Areas.

== History of Chapter Charter ==
The Diana Chapter of Shelby, Indiana, was founded on February 2, 1948. The original Petition for Charter was filed on January 30 of that same year.

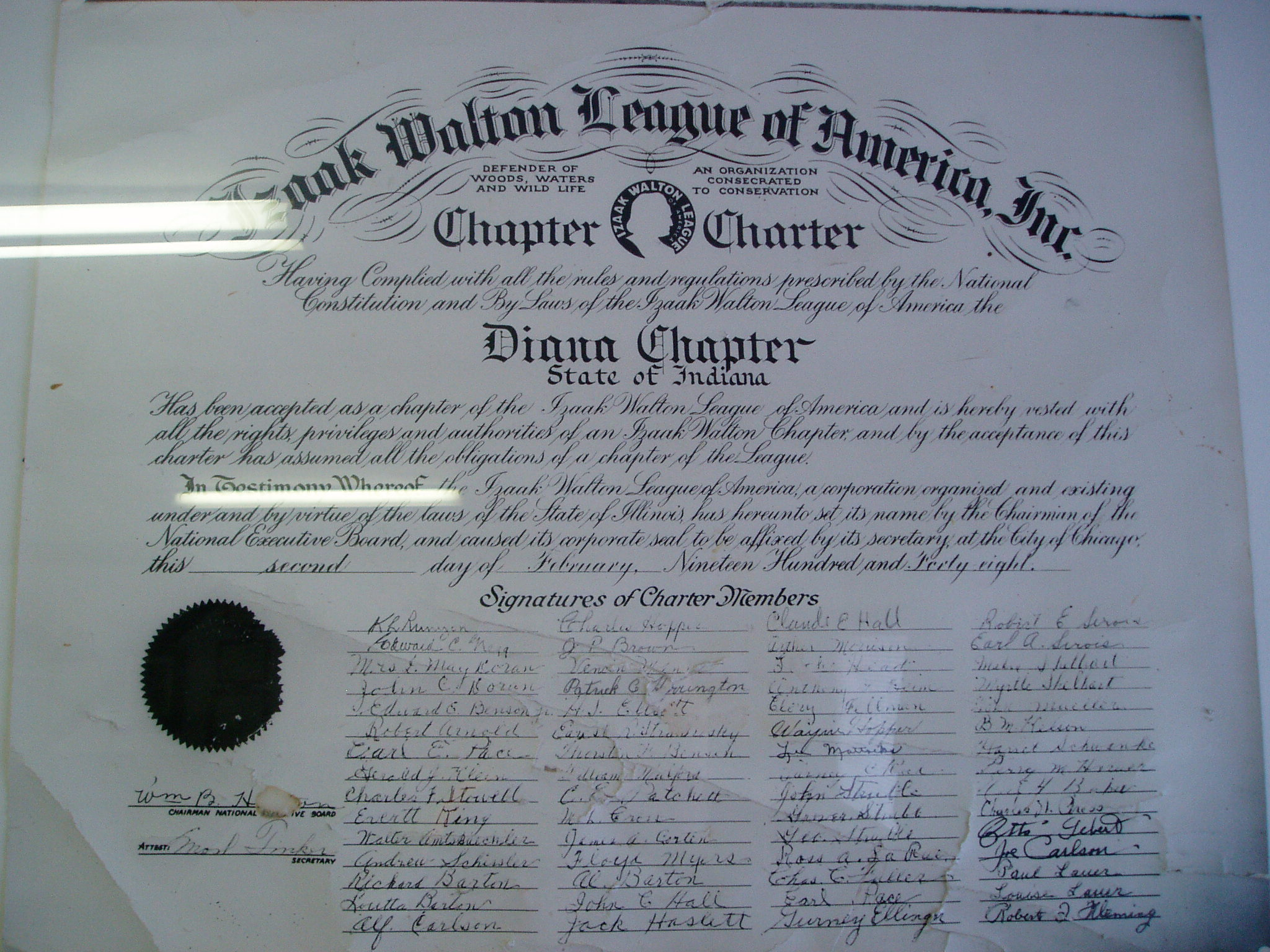
Original Charter

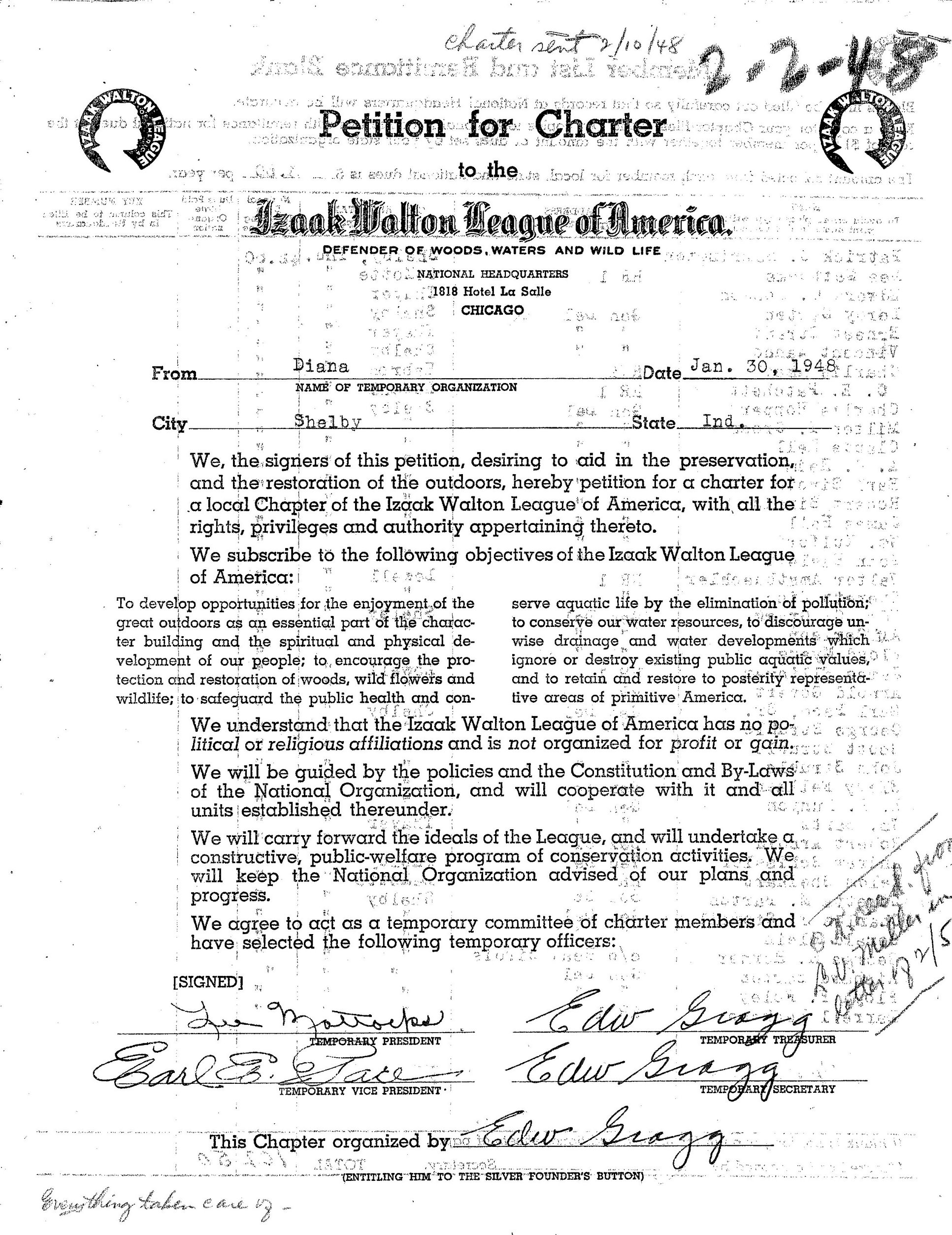
Petition for Charter page 1

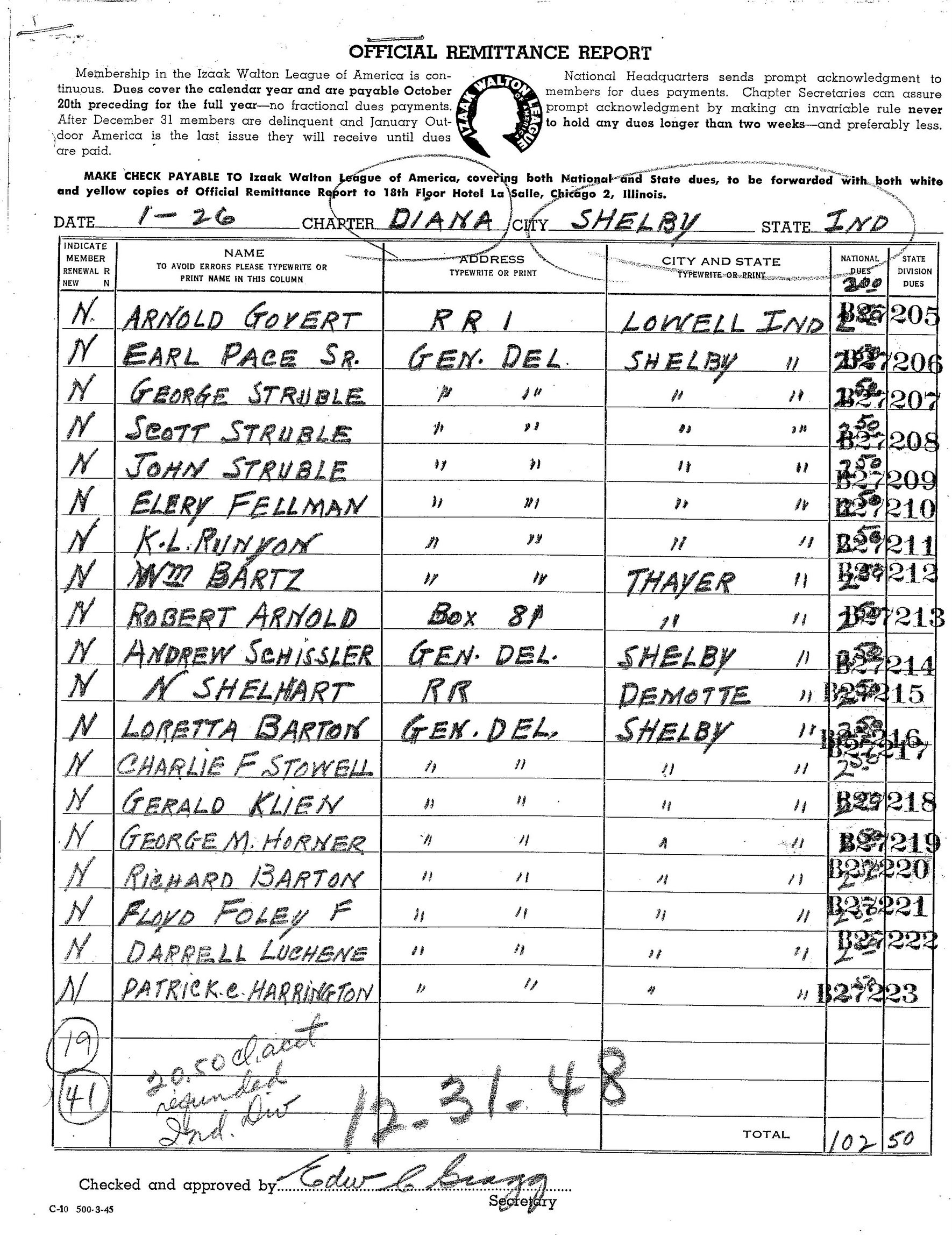
Petition for Charter page 2
