= Kofa Mountains =

Landform in Southern Arizona

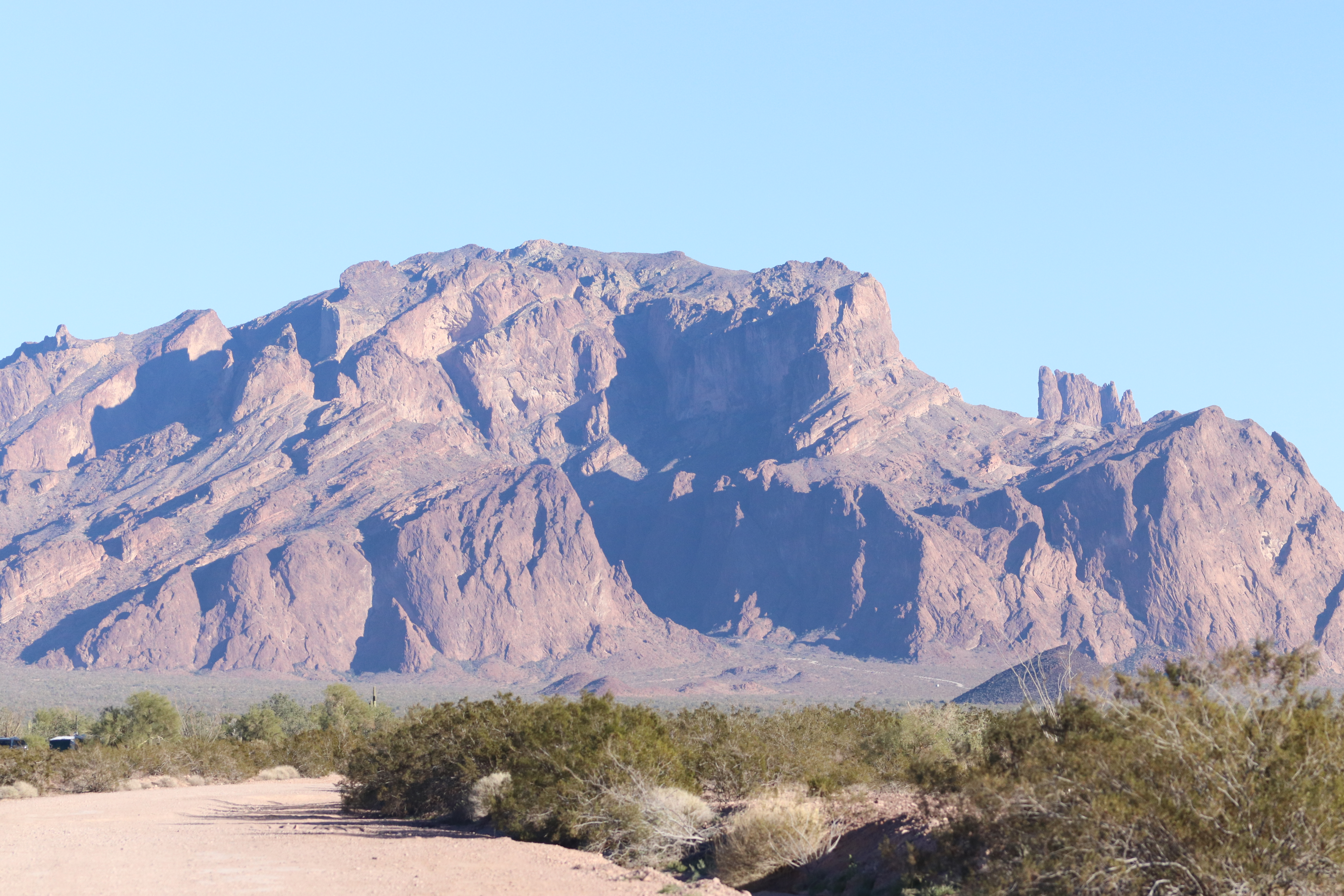
- From the west of Palm Canyon in 2026

Highest point
- Peak: Signal Peak
- Elevation: 4,877 ft (1,487 m)

Geography
- Location within Arizona
- Country: United States
- State: Arizona
- Range coordinates: 33°19′48″N 113°57′13″W

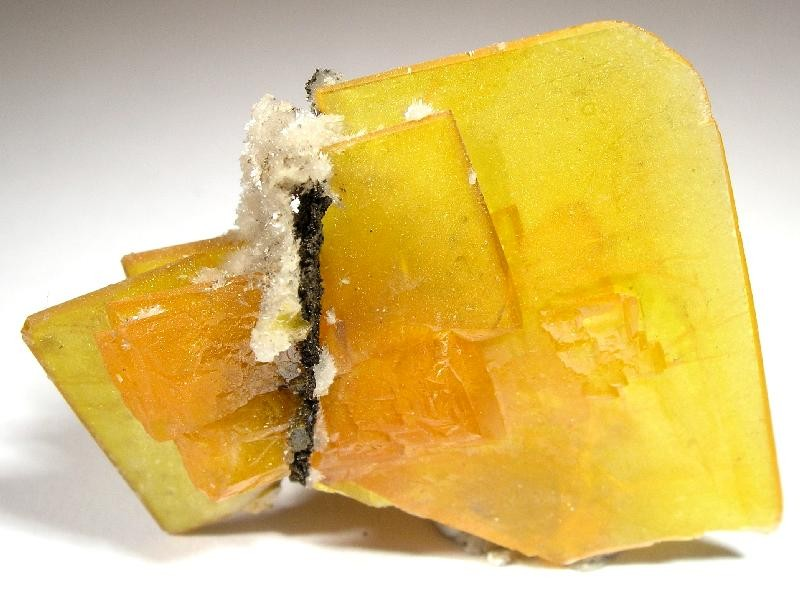
Wulfenite specimen from the old King of Arizona mine

The Kofa Mountains (Yavapai: Wi:kasayeo) of Yuma and La Paz counties in Arizona is the central mountain range of the Kofa National Wildlife Refuge. The range lies about 60 miles northeast of Yuma in the southwestern part of the state. Kofa Wilderness takes up 547,719 acres of the refuge, making it the second largest wilderness area in Arizona. The equally extensive Castle Dome Mountains comprise the southern refuge border; the western end of the Tank Mountains are in the southeast of the wildlife refuge, and the New Water Wilderness in the New Water Mountains ends the extension of the Kofa National Wildlife Refuge to the north. Scenic "King Valley" is south of the Kofa Mountains between the Castle Dome Mountains.

These mountains are home to a number of endemic or rare species including the Kofa Mountain Barberry Berberis harrisoniana. In addition, it contains the only native California fan palms in the state of Arizona located high up in Palm Canyon. These are relicts of the ice age when the range of California fan palms was much larger than its isolated groves today.

The Kofa Mountains are a northwest–southeast range with an extension northwards meeting the New Water Mountains. There are three major peaks in the high region: two in the west: Signal Peak at 4,877 feet (1,487 m) and Squaw Peak at 4,416 feet (1,346 m), and Polaris Mountain at 3,624 feet (1,105 m) in the south.

The closest community to the Kofa Mountains is Quartzsite, 30 miles northwest on Interstate 10. Access roads to the range depart a north–south stretch of US 95, five miles to the west. There are a number of winter homes in King Valley.

The wildlife refuge and the Kofa Mountains are arid and rugged volcanic remnant mountains of Tertiary age. They are home to one of the larger Desert Bighorn Sheep ranges. The wildlife refuge and the mountains are some of the hottest areas in the southwest Sonoran Desert.

== Origin of name ==
The Kofa Mountains are named for the rich King of Arizona gold mine, discovered in King Valley in 1896. The mine used to stamp its property "K of A" and is commonly known as the Kofa Mine. The old mine and its surroundings are private property. The Kofa, Arizona post office was established June 5, 1900 and was discontinued August 27, 1928. Some of the old buildings are still in use as winter homes.

== Gallery ==
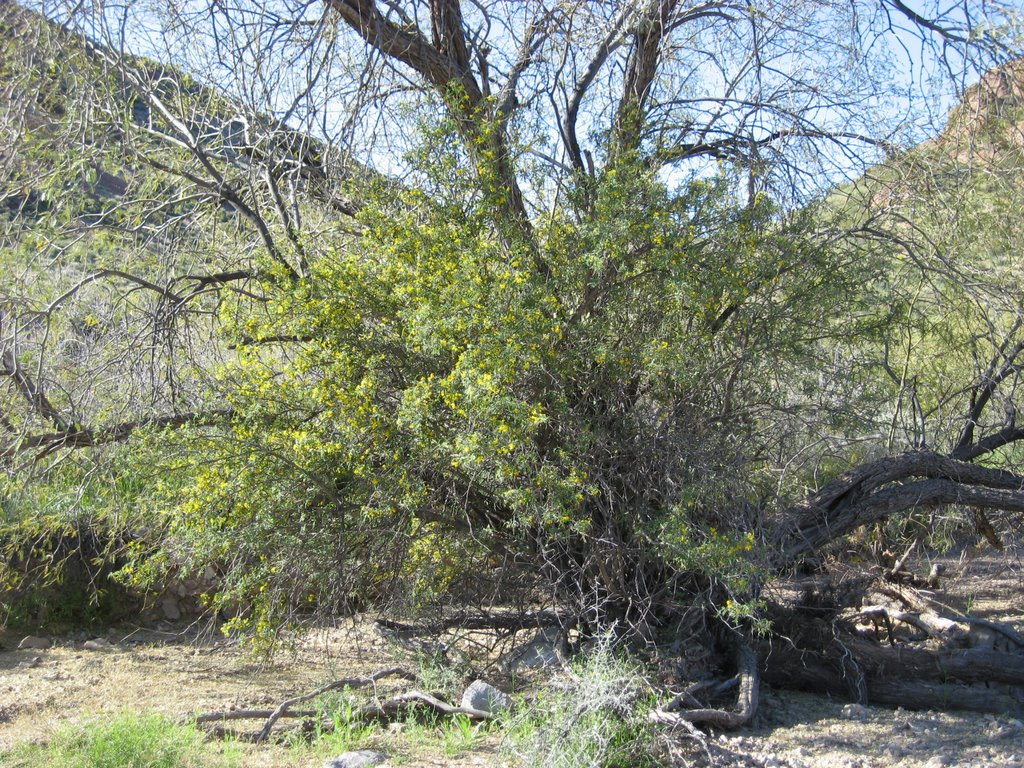
Berberis harrisoniana, the Kofa Mountain Barberry

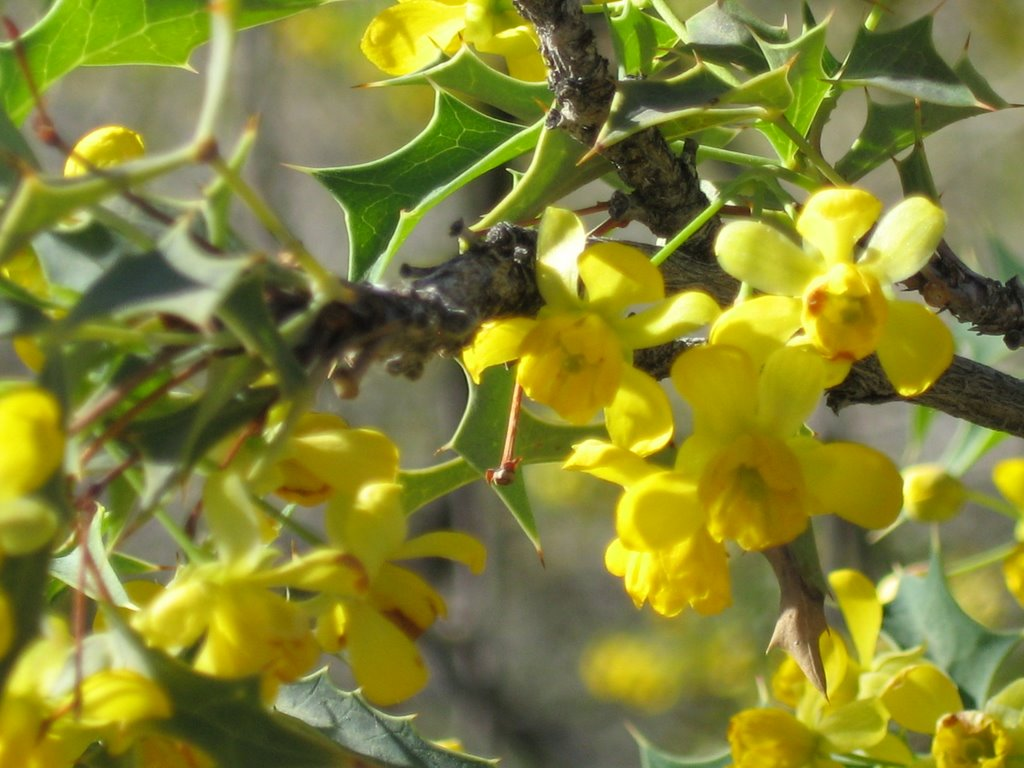
Berberis harrisoniana

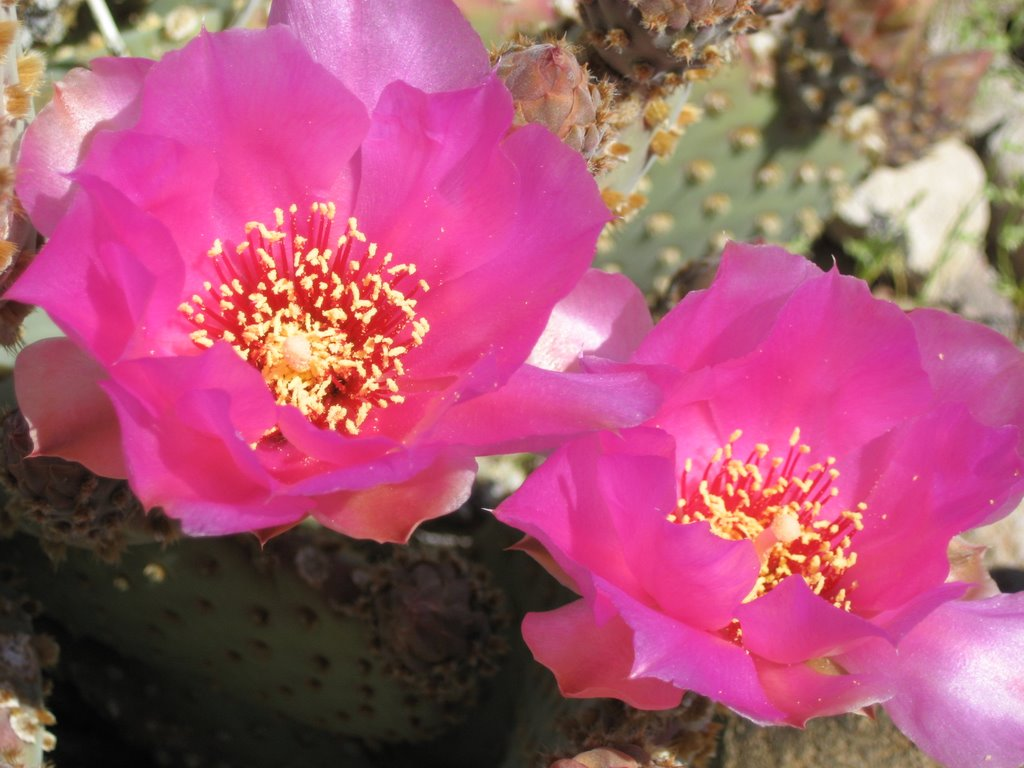
Prickly pear blossoms

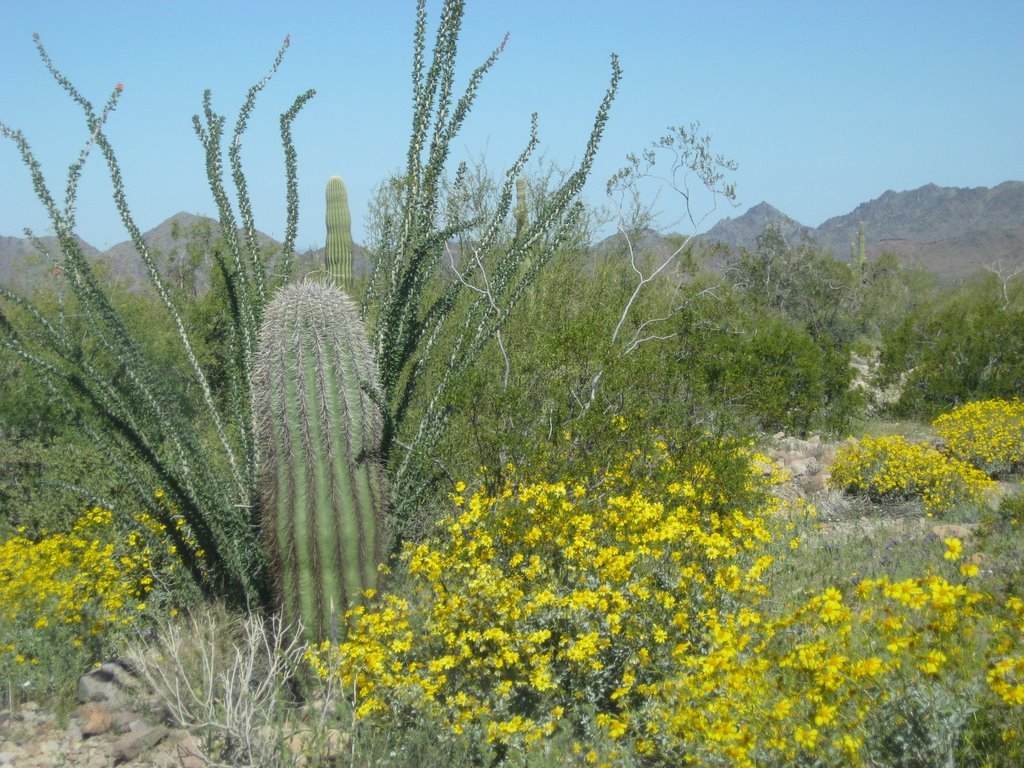
The desert in bloom

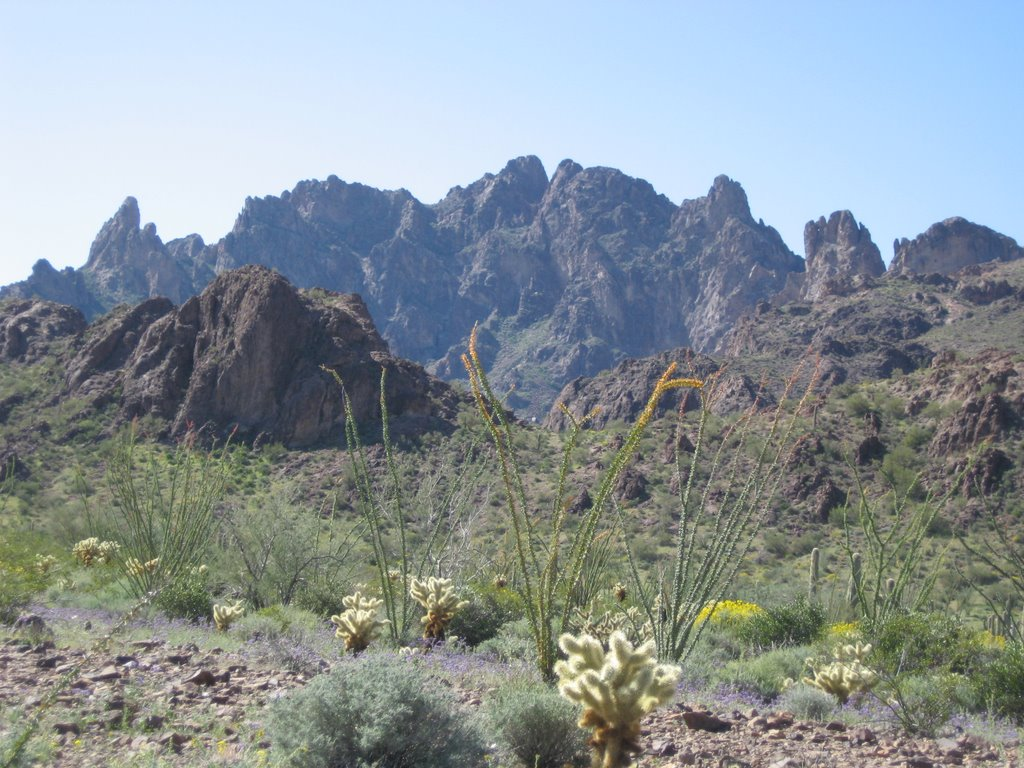
Kofa Mountains

== See also ==
- List of mountain ranges of Yuma County, Arizona
- List of mountain ranges of Arizona
- List of LCRV Wilderness Areas (Colorado River)
- Category: Yuma Desert
