= Theodore Roosevelt Council =

Boy Scouts local council

Theodore Roosevelt Council (#386)
- Owner: Boy Scouts of America
- Headquarters: Massapequa, New York
- Country: United States
- Website trcbsa.org

The Theodore Roosevelt Council, 386 was a local council of the Boy Scouts of America. It was one of the nation's oldest, having been home to its namesake, the former US president, who was a founding member of BSA. On June 24, 2026, Theodore Roosevelt Council and Suffolk County Council merged to form Scouting America Long Island.

== History ==
The council was established in 1917 as the Nassau County Council (#386). Although Nassau County was the primary residence of Theodore Roosevelt, the name was taken by another council in Arizona. In 1993, that council merged with the Grand Canyon Council, freeing the name, and the Nassau County Council assumed the name Theodore Roosevelt (#386) in September 1997.

== Organization ==
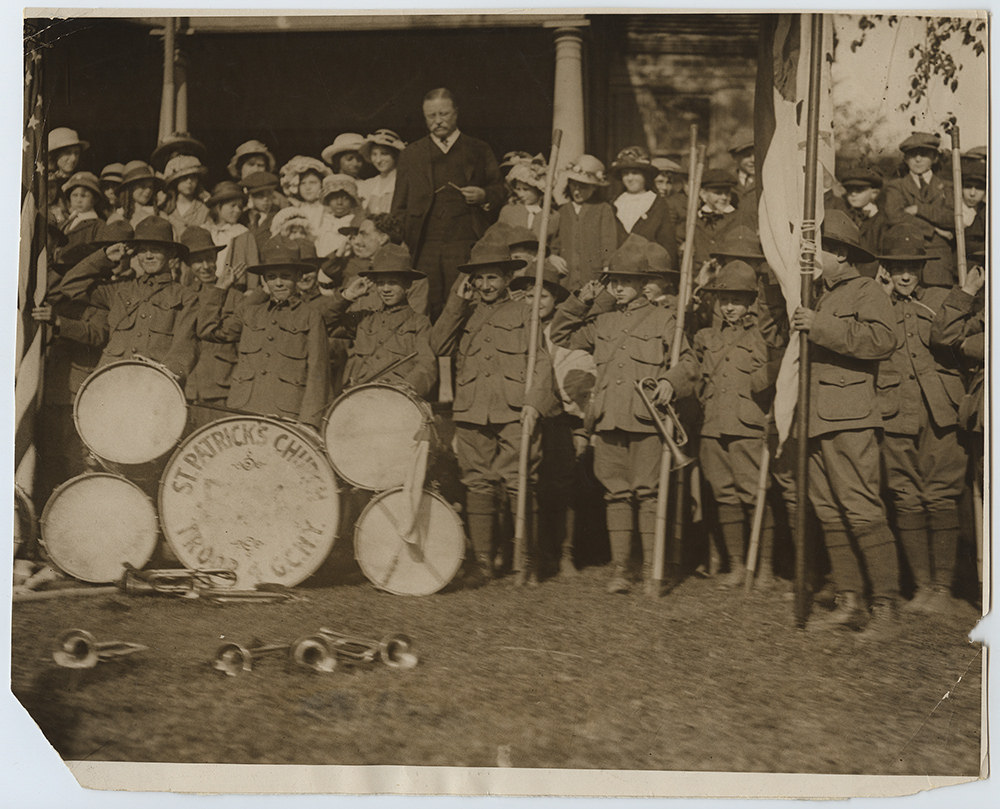
Colonel Theodore Roosevelt Has His Own Preparedness Parade at Oyster Bay

The council has four districts:

- Iroquois District
- Pequott District
- Rough Rider District
- Shelter Rock District

== Camps ==
=== John M. Schiff Scout Reservation ===
John M. Schiff Scout Reservation
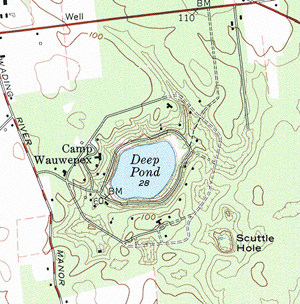
- Location: Wading River, New York
- Coordinates: 40.93628°N 72.83101°W
- Founded: 1922
- Website www.trcbsa.org/Schiff

The John M. Schiff Scout Reservation is named after John M. Schiff, the son of Mortimer L. Schiff; both of whom were World Scout Committee members and notable early Boy Scouts of America leaders. The reservation is operated by the Theodore Roosevelt Council, BSA and is located near Wading River, New York. The reservation comprises 400 acres (1.6 km^{2}) of camp located in the Long Island Pine Barrens and surrounds the 30-acre (120,000 m^{2}) "Deep Pond". Deep Pond is a kettle-hole lake formed during the last glacial age. It is 44 feet (13 m) deep. In 1922, it was moved to its present location. At the time the camp comprised 550 acres (2.2 km^{2}). Camp Wauwepex was renamed the John M. Schiff Scout Reservation when the Mortimer L. Schiff Scout Reservation was closed in 1979. The reservation ceased being used as a summer camp in 1976, but is still often used for troop, family, district and council events.

It was originally named Camp Wauwepex in 1921 in Miller Place. Wauwepex is an Indian name given to a spring situated on the west side of Cold Spring Harbor near Sagamore Hill. In 1922, it was moved to its present location. The Council bought the property in 1926 for $250,000. There were three program areas, named Pioneer Division, Frontier Division and Indian Division. The dining halls were named accordingly, as Pioneer Hall, etc. The camp divisions are no longer used, and the dining halls are now Hayden (formerly Indian) Hall and Hickcox (formerly Frontier) Hall, which burned to the ground on November 1, 2011. The cause of the fire remains under investigation although investigators have said it does not appear suspicious. The dining hall was unoccupied at the time of the fire. The old Pioneer Hall was used as a craft lodge but has since been demolished.

=== Onteora Scout Reservation ===
Onteora Scout Reservation
- Location: Livingston Manor, New York
- Coordinates: 41.9595°N 74.7582°W
- Founded: 1956
- Website trcbsa.org/camping/onteora

Onteora Scout Reservation is a Boy Scout camp, owned by the Theodore Roosevelt Council, located in Livingston Manor, New York. The camp consists of 1,400 acres (6 km^{2}) and adjoins the Catskill State Forest Preserve in the Catskill Mountains. It was opened in 1955 due to overcrowding in Camp Wauwepex. At its peak in the early 1970s, it was the nation's third-largest Boy Scout camp in terms of attendance (after Philmont and Ten Mile River), accommodating 1200 scouts at a time utilizing two dining halls and three water fronts. Nicknamed "The Land in the Sky", it was closed in 1991 and reopened in 1998 with a completely volunteer staff, and in 2003 opened for a full season with a paid staff. It is the only Boy Scout camp to have been closed, and then reopened.

The property on which the reservation is located has a long and rich history, which begins with the Lenni-Lenape Indians. They used the Sun Trail to go from the Hudson River to the Delaware. The Sun Trail ran from Hudson River to the East Branch of the Delaware and was so-called because an Indian or scout could start running at sunup and reach the other end by sundown.

Later that same trail was enlarged by John Hunter and in 1815 became known throughout the area as the Hunter Road. Since it was the first road in the area, many traders and farmers made great use of it. In the 1880s, the property became one of the favorite fishing spots of the area and a man named Todd Hammond built a large manor house on the property overlooking the lake and developed the lake and streams for trout fishing. In 1911, the Orchard Lake Club was formed by New York City businessmen who purchased the property to enjoy the trout fishing and beauty of the woods.

By the turn of the century, what is now the Al Nassau area of the reservation was then a small town consisting of five houses, a logging camp and a mill for the Resherif Lumber Company. The foundations of the houses and mill remain in evidence.

During the 1920s, the area was the property of the New York Trout and Skeet Club. Many people came to the area from the city to fish and vacation. During WWII, however, due to the rationing of gasoline, the club was forced out of business. When put up for sale in 1942, the club was bought by Mr. Charles R. Vose for $20,000. He used it as a private retreat until 1956 when the Nassau County Council bought the property with the help of a donation from Mr. Alfred H. Capery. Many of the buildings were constructed between 1958 and 1962.

== Order of the Arrow ==
The council's Order of the Arrow lodge is called Buckskin Lodge 412.

== See also ==
- Scouting in New York
