= Jeanne Moment =

American female artist and environmentalist (1901–1984)

- Born: 1901; California
- Died: 1984 (aged 82–83); Portland, Oregon

Jeanne Moment (1901–1984) was an American artist, educator, and environmental activist, best known for her expressive landscapes and graphic works, as well as for being a key catalyst for the "Keep America Beautiful" campaign of the early 1950s.

== Education and teaching ==
Born in 1901, Jeanne Moment lived and studied in California for the first part of her life. Her academic background included studies at the University of California, Berkeley, and the Columbia University School of the Arts. She also studied at the Museum Art School (now the Pacific Northwest College of Art), under the artist William H. Givler. Before moving to the Pacific Northwest, she had a professional career as a high school teacher in Los Angeles for twenty-five years.

== Move to Oregon and artwork ==
In 1940, she and her husband, Samuel Moment, relocated to Oregon, a move that influenced her artistic career. She engaged with Oregon's outdoor experiences and her passion for nature and the environment became a constant subject matter. She worked in a variety of media, including oil, watercolor, ink wash, and lithography.

Her early landscapes often reflected the influence of the 19th-century English artist J. M. W. Turner, particularly in her use of color to illuminate the subtleties of nature. In her later years, especially after 1960, Moment increasingly turned to graphics and a more abstract, less representational style, though nature remained her central focus.

== Environmental activism and legacy ==
Moment's first-hand experience with the pristine beauty of the wilderness and the destructive tendencies of human pollution motivated her and her husband, Samuel, to become politically active environmentalists. This was also motivated by the first evidence of approaching a town was often a mountain of garbage and abandoned automobiles.

Their efforts led to a nationally recognized legacy of the "Keep America Beautiful" campaign. It quickly earned endorsements from many public figures, including Walt Disney. The phrase "Keep America Beautiful" was the couple's idea in 1952. Their efforts began in Oregon "to teach Litterbugs and Vandalbugs to stop acting like pigs". This was beginning of a national effort to raise awereness. She designed a shopping bag used for the campaign.

The Moments were also instrumental in encouraging several states to require deposits on returnable beverage containers, part of their practical environmental policy. Other initiatives included persuading automakers to include trash receptacles in their cars, paper bags at gas stations so motorists and service attendants can dispose trash, and pushing for public funding for installing waste containers as well as emptying them quickly.

Moment's artwork appeared in shows, particularly after she began focusing on graphics in the 1960s. Her work is in the permanent collections of the Portland Art Museum, the Oregon Historical Society Museum, Reed College, and the Hallie Ford Museum of Art, among others.
