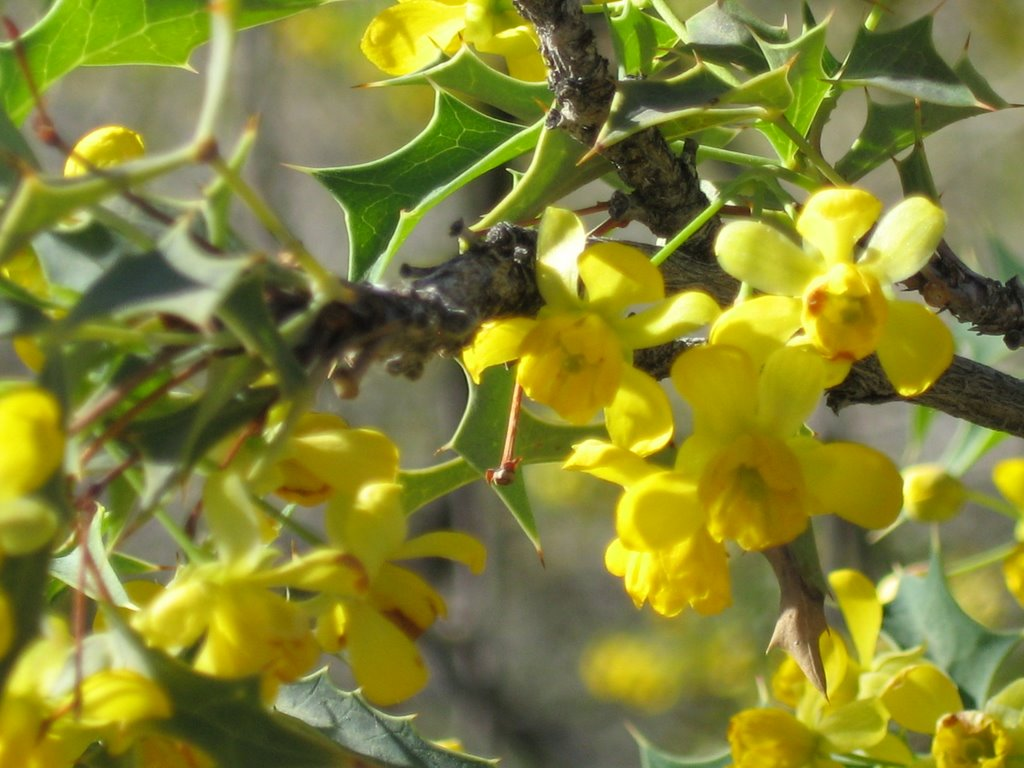

Conservation status
- Imperiled (NatureServe)

Scientific classification
- Kingdom: Plantae
- Clade: Tracheophytes
- Clade: Angiosperms
- Clade: Eudicots
- Order: Ranunculales
- Family: Berberidaceae
- Genus: Berberis
- Species: B. harrisoniana

Binomial name
- Berberis harrisoniana Kearney & Peebles

Synonyms
- Mahonia harrisoniana

= Berberis harrisoniana =

Plant species in the barberry family

Berberis harrisoniana (syn: Mahonia harrisoniana) is a rare species of flowering plant in the barberry family, Berberidaceae. It is known by the common names Kofa barberry, Kofa Mountain barberry, Harrison's barberry, and red barberry.

It is native to the southwestern United States, where it occurs in the Sonoran Colorado Desert in far eastern San Bernardino County in southeastern California and in the Sonoran Desert region in southwestern Arizona (Yuma, La Paz, Pima and Maricopa counties).

It occurs in shaded, rocky canyons in the mountains, at an elevation of approximately 800–1000 meters.

== Description ==
This plant is a rounded shrub usually growing up to 1.5 meters tall, sometimes reaching 2 meters. The leaves are trifoliate, with three spine-tipped leaflets each a few centimeters long. The inflorescence is a dense cluster of up to 11 flowers. Each bright yellow flower has 9 sepals. The fruit is a juicy blue-black berry about half a centimeter wide.

The compound leaves place this species in the group sometimes segregated as the genus Mahonia.

== Taxonomy ==
Berberis harrisoniana was scientifically described and named by Thomas Henry Kearney and Robert Hibbs Peebles in 1939. The botanist Hui-lin Li reclassified it into the genus Mahonia in 1963, however Mahonia is considered to be a synonym of Berberis by Plants of the World Online. Along with the rest of its genus it is classified in the Berberidaceae family.
