= Kofa National Wildlife Refuge =

Protected area in Arizona, United States

- IUCN category IV (habitat/species management area)
- Location within the United States
- Location: Yuma County and La Paz County, Arizona, United States
- Nearest city: Yuma, AZ–S; Quartzsite, AZ–N
- Coordinates: 33°16′N 114°00′W
- Area: 665,400 acres (2,693 km^{2})
- Established: 1939
- Governing body: US Fish & Wildlife Service
- Website: Kofa National Wildlife Refuge

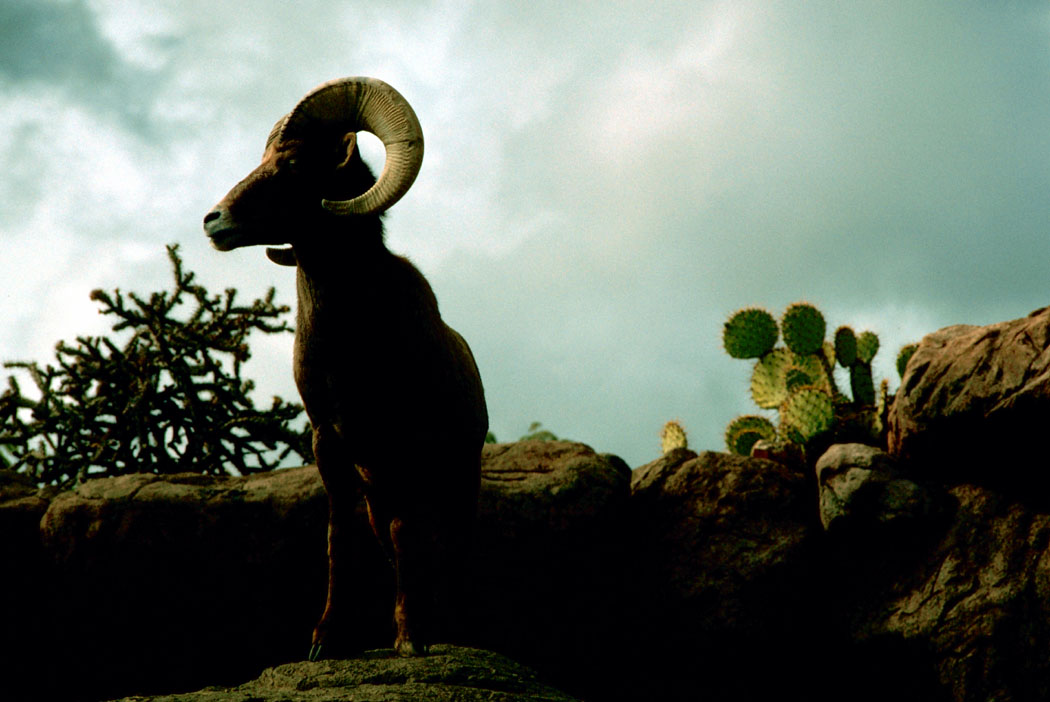
Bighorn sheep in the Kofa National Wildlife Refuge

The Kofa National Wildlife Refuge is located in Arizona in the southwestern United States, northeast of Yuma and southeast of Quartzsite. The refuge, established in 1939 to protect desert bighorn sheep, encompasses over 665,400 acres (2,693 km^{2}) of the Yuma Desert region of the Sonoran Desert. Broad, gently sloping foothills as well as the sharp, needlepoint peaks of the Kofa Mountains are found in the rugged refuge. The small, widely scattered waterholes attract a surprising number of water birds for a desert area. A wide variety of plant life is also found throughout the refuge. Kofa Wilderness takes up 547,719 acres of the refuge, making it the second largest wilderness area in Arizona.

== History ==
The name Kofa comes from a former area gold mine: the King of Arizona mine (active from 1897 to 1910), with Kofa a contraction of the name.

In 1936, the Arizona Boy Scouts mounted a statewide campaign to save the bighorn sheep, leading to the creation of Kofa. The Scouts first became interested in the sheep through the efforts of Major Frederick Russell Burnham, the noted frontiersman turned conservationist who co-founded Scouting Burnham observed that fewer than 150 of these sheep lived in the Arizona mountains. He called George F. Miller, then scout executive of the Boy Scout council headquartered in Phoenix, with a plan to save the sheep. Burnham put it this way:

I want you to save this majestic animal, not only because it is in danger of extinction, but of more importance, some day it might provide domestic sheep with a strain to save them from disaster at the hands of a yet unknown virus.

Several other prominent Arizonans joined the movement and a "save the bighorns" poster contest was started in schools throughout the state. Burnham provided prizes and appeared in store windows from one end of Arizona to the other. The contest-winning bighorn emblem was made into neckerchief slides for the 10,000 Boy Scouts, and talks and dramatizations were given at school assemblies and on radio. The National Wildlife Federation, the Izaak Walton League, and the Audubon Society joined the effort.

On January 18, 1939, over 1.5 million acres (6,100 km^{2}) were set aside at Kofa and at Cabeza Prieta National Wildlife Refuge combined, and a civilian conservation corps side camp was set up to develop high mountain waterholes for the sheep. On April 2, 1939, Kofa National Wildlife Refuge was officially opened; Burnham gave the dedication speech. The desert bighorn sheep is now the official mascot for the Arizona Boy Scouts, and the number of sheep in these parks have increased substantially. The Kofa Game Range, as it was called, was originally administered jointly by the U.S. Fish and Wildlife Service and the Bureau of Land Management. On February 5, 1975, Kofa was transferred exclusively to the Bureau of Land Management. But in 1976 complete authority was returned to the Department of Fish and Wildlife Services and the Kofa Game Range was renamed the Kofa National Wildlife Refuge.

== Wildlife ==
The population of desert bighorn sheep was recently estimated to be 428. They live mainly in the two ranges that dominate the refuge landscape – the Kofa Mountains and Castle Dome Mountains of northern Yuma County and southern La Paz County. These mountains are not especially high, but they are extremely rugged and rise sharply from the surrounding desert plains, providing excellent bighorn sheep habitat. In recent years, this herd has provided animals for transplanting throughout Arizona and neighboring states.

Other notable wildlife species found in the area include the badger, desert tortoise and kit fox. Bird species that occur at Kofa include the white-winged dove, American kestrel, northern flicker, Say's phoebe, cactus wren, phainopepla, and orange-crowned warbler. In recent years, the cougar has established a full-time presence in the park.

== Plants ==
The Kofa Mountain barberry, Berberis harrisoniana, a rare plant endemic to southwestern Arizona, occurs on the refuge. It is also home to the desert fan palm (Washingtonia filifera), the only native palm in Arizona.

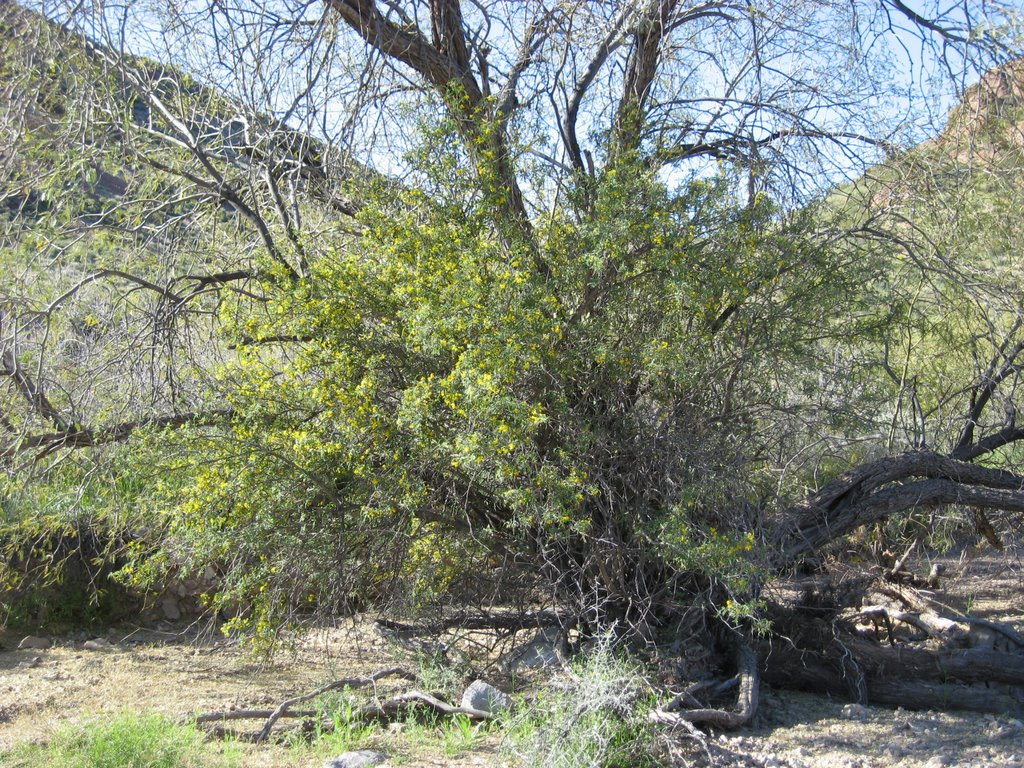
Berberis harrisoniana

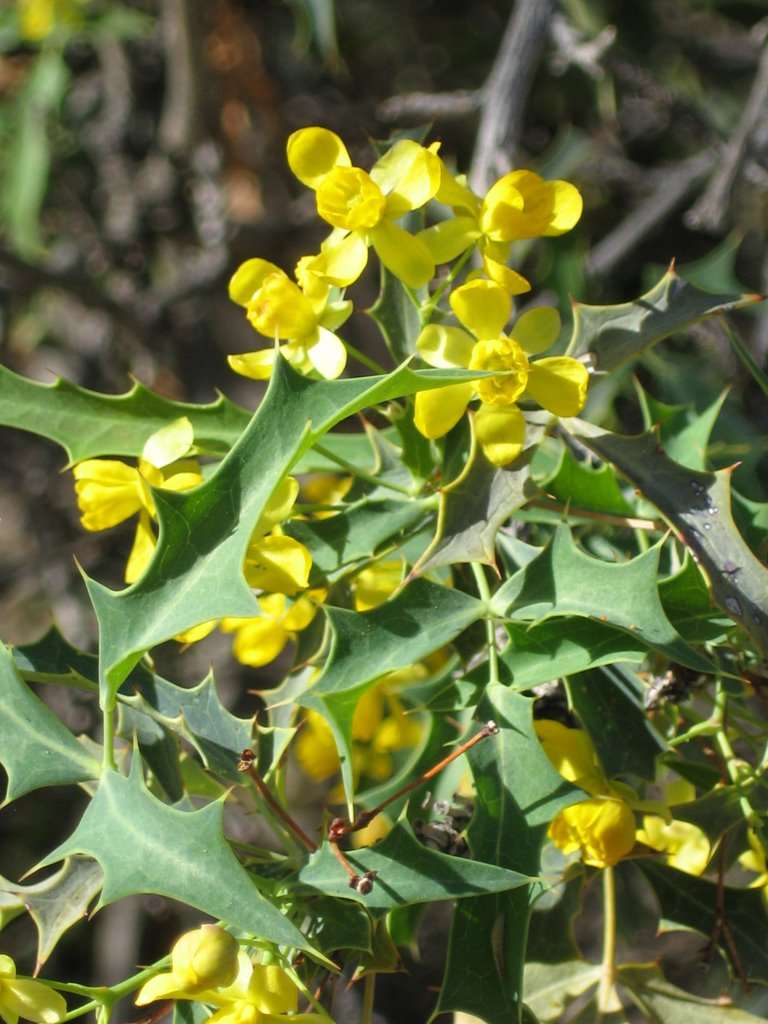
Berberis harrisoniana

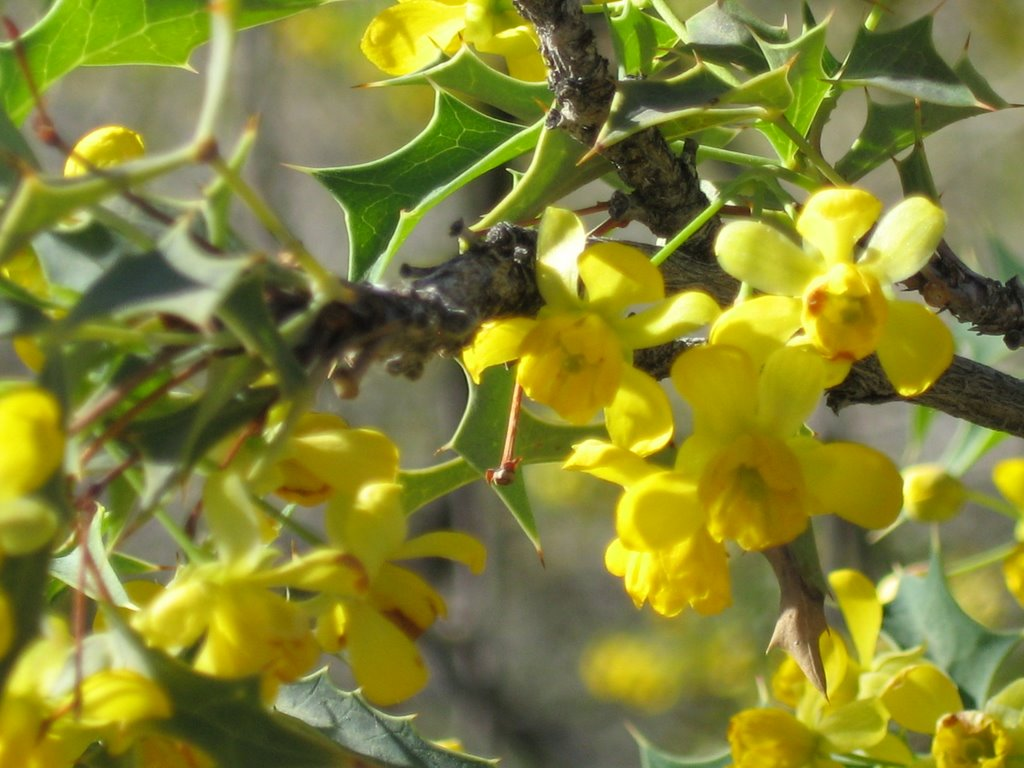
Berberis harrisoniana

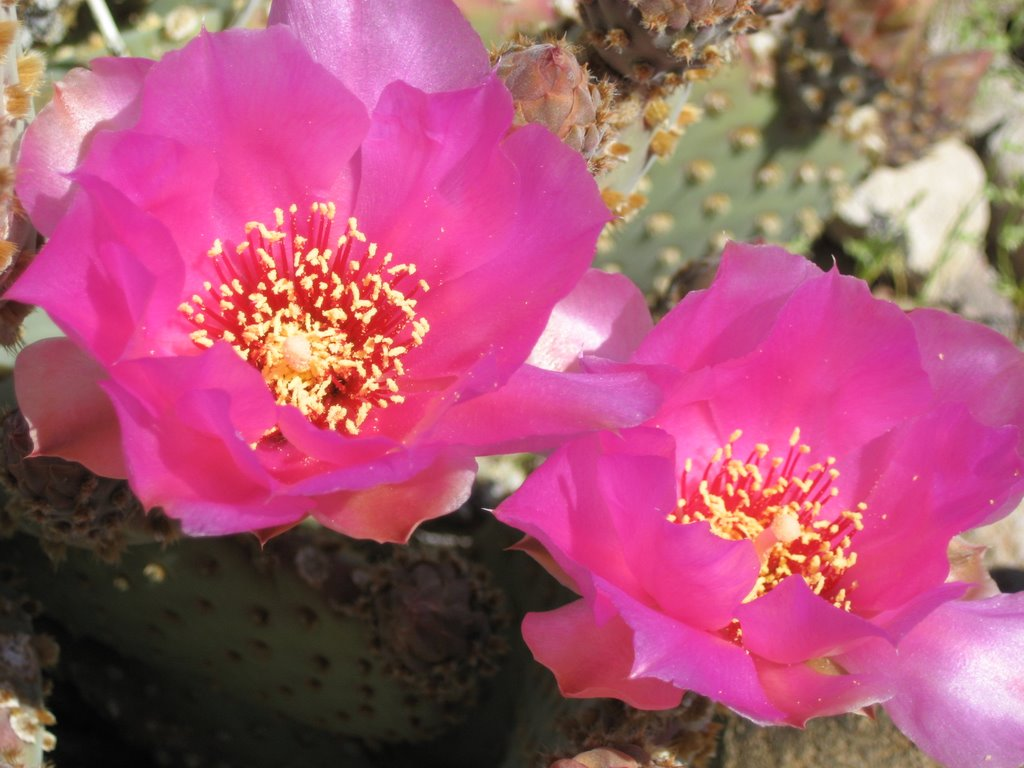
Prickly pear blossoms

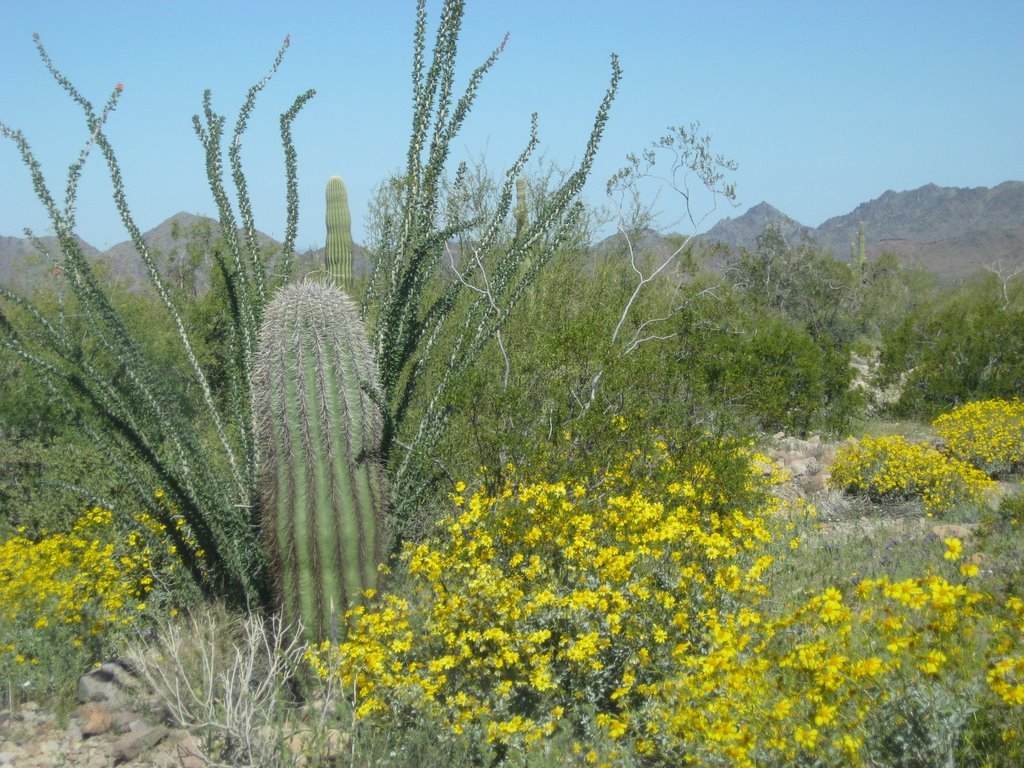
The desert in bloom

== Hiking ==
=== Palm Canyon ===
Palm Canyon is a unique natural feature predominantly known for the native palm trees that grow in the canyon. These are rare in Arizona and are likely relics of a geological period when the area was wetter and cooler.

==== Visiting ====
The turnoff for Palm Canyon is located at Milepost 85 on US Highway 95. A parking area is about eight miles east down a gravel road. Half a mile down the trail is a sign indicating the California fan palms. The hike to the canyon is short but strenuous. The Palm Canyon Trail is a National Recreation Trail.

The refuge provides opportunities for viewing desert plants and wildlife, rock climbing, exploring old mines, and remote wilderness camping. Temperatures often exceed 120 °F (49 °C) in the summer, and rain falls only a few times per year.

Regulated hunting on the refuge is permitted for quail, bighorn sheep, deer, cottontail rabbit, coyote, and fox.

Kofa was included in the desert military training exercises conducted by General George S. Patton during World War II. Unexploded ordnance may be encountered during cross-country hiking.

360° panorama from the summit of Crystal Hill, Kofa National Wildlife Refuge, Quartzsite, Arizona

== See also ==
- List of flora of the Sonoran Desert Region by common name
- Fauna of the Sonoran Desert
- Camp Hyder
