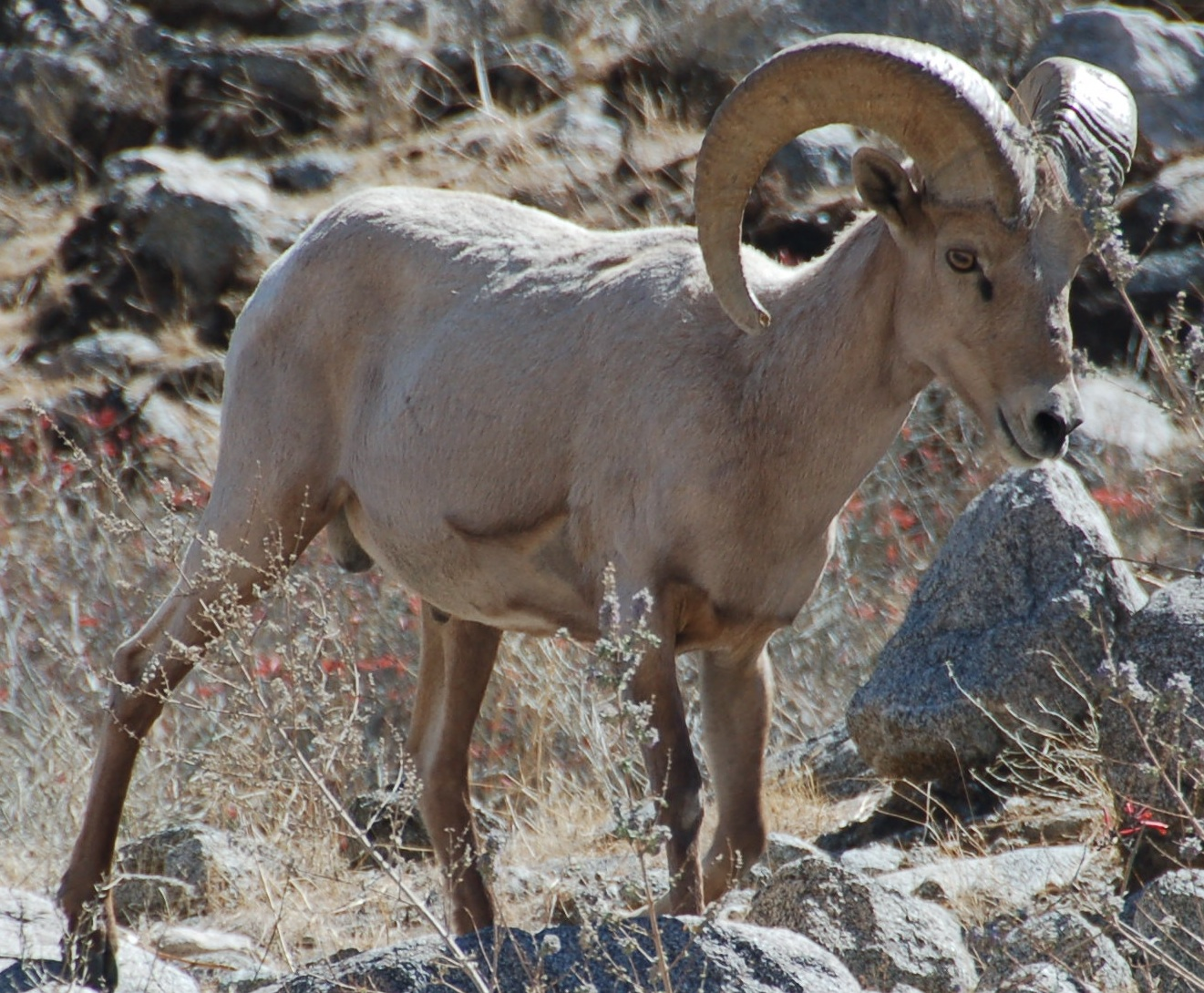
- In Anza-Borrego Desert State Park, California

Conservation status
- Apparently Secure (NatureServe)

Scientific classification
- Kingdom: Animalia
- Phylum: Chordata
- Class: Mammalia
- Order: Artiodactyla
- Family: Bovidae
- Subfamily: Caprinae
- Genus: Ovis
- Species: O. canadensis
- Subspecies: O. c. nelsoni

Trinomial name
- Ovis canadensis nelsoni Merriam, 1897

= Desert bighorn sheep =

Subspecies of bighorn sheep

The desert bighorn sheep (Ovis canadensis nelsoni) is a subspecies of bighorn sheep (Ovis canadensis) that is native to the deserts of the United States' Intermountain West and southwestern regions, as well as northwestern Mexico. The Bureau of Land Management considered the subspecies "sensitive" to extinction.

The trinomial of this species commemorates the American naturalist Edward William Nelson (1855–1934). The characteristics and behavior of the desert bighorn sheep generally follow those of other bighorn sheep, except for adaptation to the lack of water in the desert. They can go for extended periods of time without drinking water.

The desert bighorn sheep is the state mammal of Nevada. It is also the mascot of the Universidad Autónoma de Baja California.

== Distribution ==
The range of the desert bighorn sheep includes habitats in the Mojave Desert, Sonoran Desert, Great Basin Desert, and Chihuahuan Desert, as well as the Colorado Plateau. Anza-Borrego Desert State Park, Joshua Tree National Park, Death Valley National Park, Kofa National Wildlife Refuge, Cabeza Prieta National Wildlife Refuge, Zion National Park, Capitol Reef, and Mojave National Preserve all offer protected habitat for them. The subspecies is considered extirpated from Oregon.

Populations of the desert bighorn sheep declined drastically with European colonization of the American Southwest beginning in the 16th century. These declines were followed by a period of population stabilization ascribed to conservation measures. As of 2004, desert bighorn sheep numbers remained extremely low, although the overall population trend had increased since 1960.

== Characteristics ==
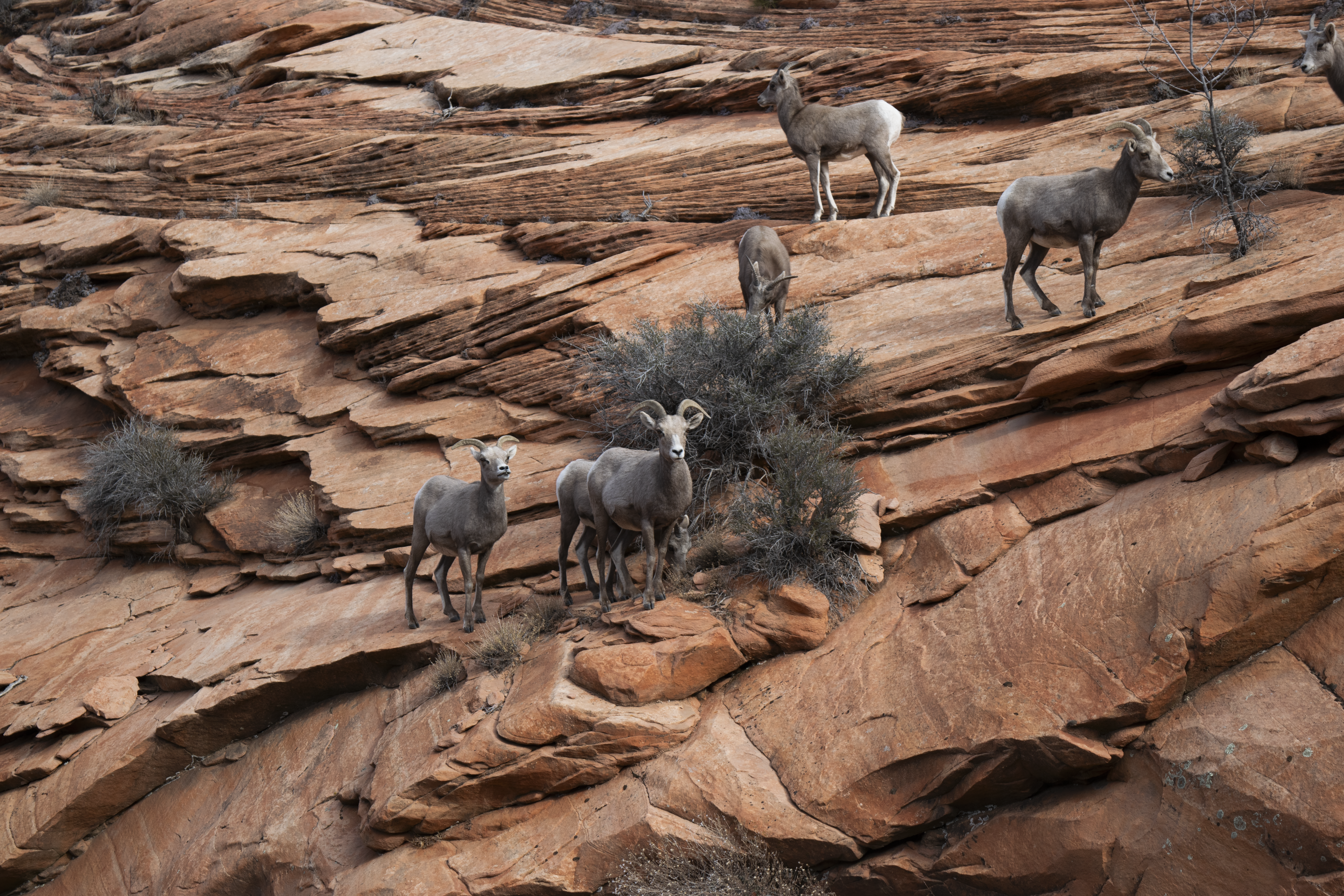
A herd of sheep

Desert bighorn sheep are stocky, heavy-bodied sheep, similar in size to mule deer. Weights of mature rams range from 115 to 280 pounds (52 to 127 kg), while ewes are somewhat smaller. Due to their unique concave elastic hooves, bighorn are able to climb the steep, rocky terrain of the desert mountains with speed and agility. They rely on their keen eyesight to detect potential predators, such as mountain lions, coyotes, and bobcats, and they use their climbing ability to escape.

Both sexes develop horns soon after birth, with horn growth continuing more or less throughout life. Older rams have curling horns measuring over three feet long with more than one foot of circumference at the base. The ewes' horns are much smaller and lighter and do not tend to curl. After eight years of growth, the horns of an adult ram may weigh more than 30 pounds. Annual growth rings indicate the animal's age. The rams may rub their own horns to improve their field of view. Both rams and ewes use their horns as tools to break open cactus, which they consume, and for fighting.

Desert bighorn sheep typically live for 10–20 years. The typical diet of a desert bighorn sheep is mainly grasses. When grasses are unavailable, they turn to other food sources, such as sedges, forbs, or cacti.

=== Desert adaptations ===
The desert bighorn has become well adapted to living in the desert heat and cold and, unlike most mammals, their body temperature can safely fluctuate several degrees. During the heat of the day, they often rest in the shade of trees and caves.

Southern desert bighorn sheep are adapted to a desert mountain environment with little or no permanent water. Some may go without visiting water for weeks or months, sustaining their body moisture from food and from rainwater collected in temporary rock pools. They may have the ability to lose up to 30% of their body weight and still survive. After drinking water, they quickly recover from their dehydrated condition. Wildlife ecologists are just beginning to study the importance of this adaptive strategy, which has allowed small bands of desert bighorns to survive in areas too dry for many of their predators.

=== Social life ===
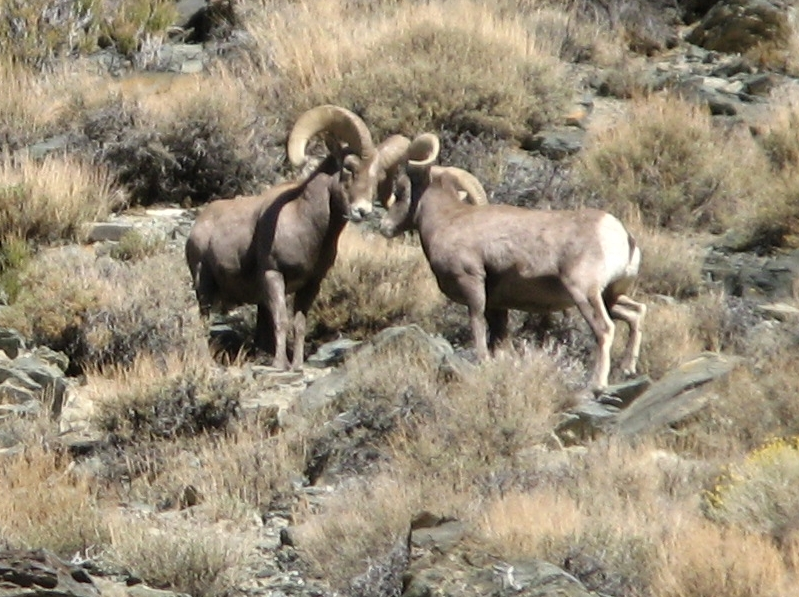
Rams battling with their horns

Desert bighorn sheep are social, forming herds of eight to 10 individuals; sometimes herds of 100 are observed.

Rams battle to determine the dominant animal, which then gains possession of the ewes. Facing each other, rams charge head-on from distances of 20 ft (6.1 m) or more, crashing their massive horns together with tremendous impact, until one or the other ceases.

Desert bighorn sheep live in separate ram and ewe bands most of the year. They gather during the breeding season (usually July–October), but breeding may occur anytime in the desert due to suitable climatic conditions. Gestation lasts 150–180 days (5–6 months), and the lambs are usually born in late winter.

== Conservation status and trends ==
The number of desert bighorn sheep in North America in prehistoric times is unknown, but most likely was in the tens of thousands. By the 1960s, the desert bighorn population had dwindled to 6,700-8,100. These declines were attributed to excessive hunting; competition and diseases from domestic livestock, particularly domestic sheep; usurpation of watering areas and critical range by human activities; and human-induced habitat changes.

In 1939, after intense lobbying by Frederick Russell Burnham and the Arizona Boy Scouts, President Franklin D. Roosevelt signed a proclamation to establish two desert areas in southwestern Arizona to help preserve the desert bighorn sheep: Cabeza Prieta National Wildlife Refuge and the Kofa National Wildlife Refuge. In 1941, the San Andres National Wildlife Refuge in New Mexico was added.

Population estimate by year
State	1960	1993	2023
Arizona	3,000-3,500	6,000	5,600
California	2,140-2,450	4,300-4,325	4,500
Colorado	0	475	500
Nevada	1,500-2,000	5,294	7,100
New Mexico	400–500	295	1,168
Texas	25	401	530
Utah	Remnant	2,200-2,250	3,273
Total	7,100-8,500	~19,000	~22,700

Desert bighorn sheep populations have trended upward since the 1960s. The upward trend was caused by conservation measures, including habitat preservation. In 1978, desert bighorn sheep populations were estimated at 8,415-9,040. A state-by-state survey published in 1985 estimated the overall US desert bighorn sheep population at 15,980. The 1993 estimate of the population is 18,965-19,040.

In Southwestern Utah, desert bighorns were largely extirpated by 1960, until 14 sheep were re-introduced into Zion National Park in 1978. The southeastern corner of the park is closed to all human traffic to protect their habitat. The herd has now grown to over 500 animals, to the point that they often come in contact with visitors in the eastern part of the park, and may begin spreading into surrounding agriculture areas with domesticated sheep.

In southern California, by 1998, only 280 individuals of the peninsular bighorn sheep population remained, and that population was added to the list of the United States' most imperiled animal populations. Populations in three southern counties had suffered greatly from disease, development, and predation. As of 2008, about 800 peninsular bighorns are believed to populate the desert backcountry from the US-Mexico border to the San Jacinto Mountains, with known populations in Anza-Borrego Desert State Park. These gains, combined with Bush administration policies, prompted the US Fish and Wildlife Service to propose a reduction in protected sheep habitat by more than 50%, from 844,897 to 384,410 acres (3,419.18 to 1,555.65 km^{2}).

In southern Texas, desert bighorn sheep conservation began in 1973 with the release of seven captive-bred sheep in the Sierra Diablo Mountains. Captive-bred sheep were periodically released in this area until 1997. The Elephant Mountain Wildlife Management Area herd began with 20 sheep total in 1987. The Elephant Mountain population has increased substantially, and this population has been the source for most translocation efforts in the state so far. The Sierra Vieja population started in 1987 with 5 sheep, and from 2014 to 2015, an additional 76 sheep were released, half of them fitted with radio telemetry collars to understand their movements more. The Van Horn population came from wild-caught Nevada sheep in 1987. This population did not do so well due to predation from mountain lions. The Culberson County population was also started in 1988 from wild-caught sheep from Nevada. The Black Gap Wildlife Management Area population translocation began in 1995 with 20 sheep. Over the next five years, 73 more sheep would be released with origins from Nevada and Elephant Mountain. Restoration efforts picked up again in 2018 with the release of 82 sheep from Elephant Mountain. Most of those sheep were fitted with radio telemetry collars to track population factors. A very limited number of hunting permits are awarded per year in Texas, with one public land permit being donated to a conservation organization for auction purposes. Most of these funds go back to the conservation of the bighorn sheep. In 2020, three Texas Parks and Wildlife Department employees died in a helicopter accident working on desert bighorn sheep conservation.

On December 4, 2024, 77 desert bighorn sheep were successfully transported from the Elephant Mountain WMA and released at Franklin Mountains State Park, including many pregnant ewes. Prior to release, all animals were fitted with GPS collars, tagged, and tested negative for the Mycoplasma ovipneumonia bacteria.

== In popular culture ==
In 2023 the desert bighorn was featured on a United States Postal Service Forever stamp as part of the Endangered Species set, based on a photograph from Joel Sartore's Photo Ark. The stamp was dedicated at a ceremony at the National Grasslands Visitor Center in Wall, South Dakota.
