= Pinacate Peaks =

Group of volcanic mountains and cinder cones in Sonora, Mexico

- Cuk Doʼag; Sierra del Pinacate
- Location within Sonora Location within Mexico

Highest point
- Coordinates: 31.77°N 113.49°W

Geography
- Location: (north-central)-Sonoran Desert; El Pinacate y Gran Desierto de Altar, Sonora, Mexico

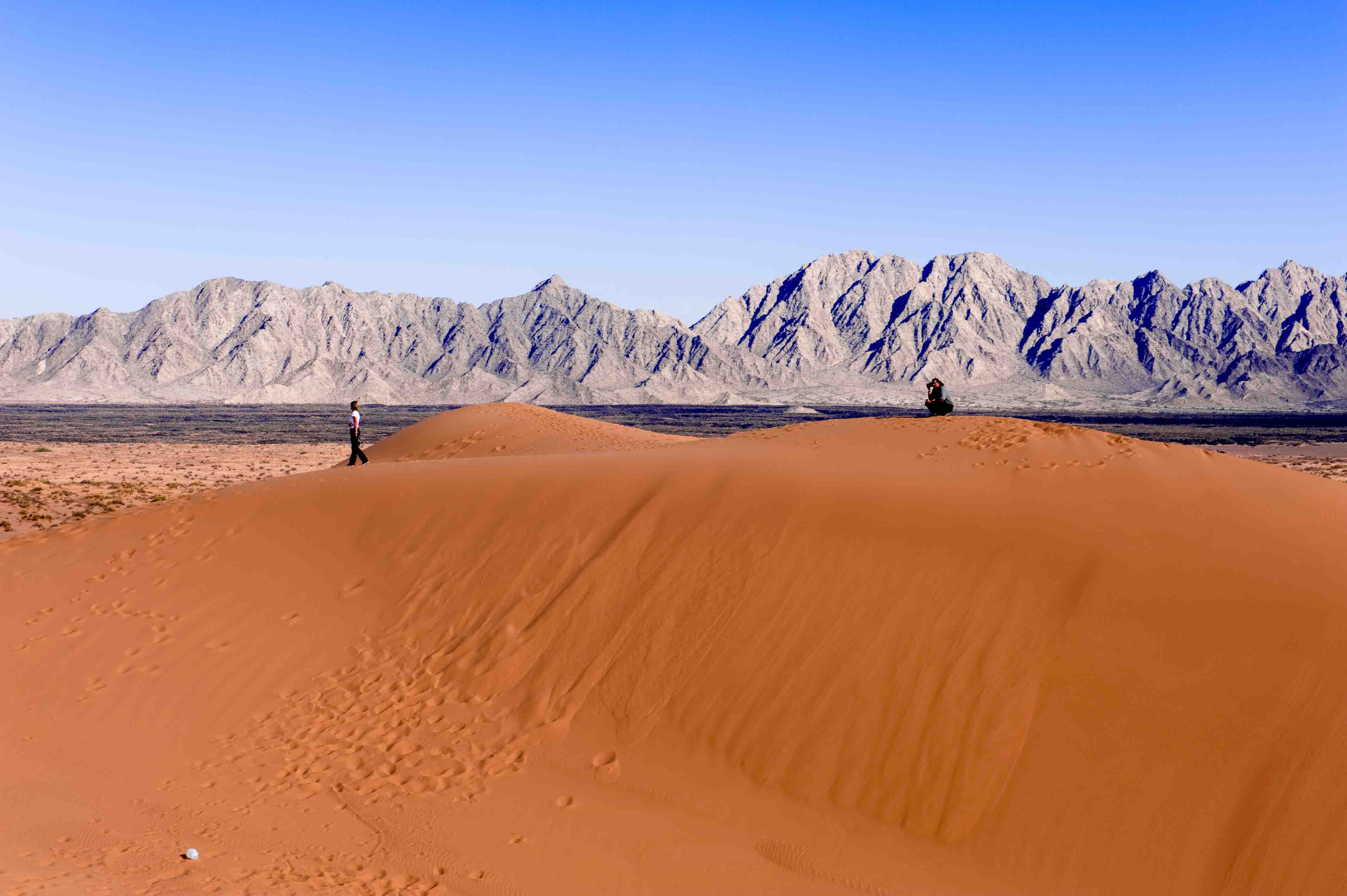
Pinacate sand dunes and craters

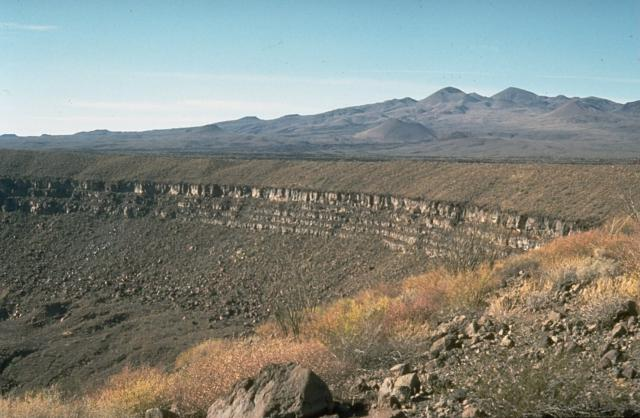
Crater Elegante with the Pinacate Peaks in the background

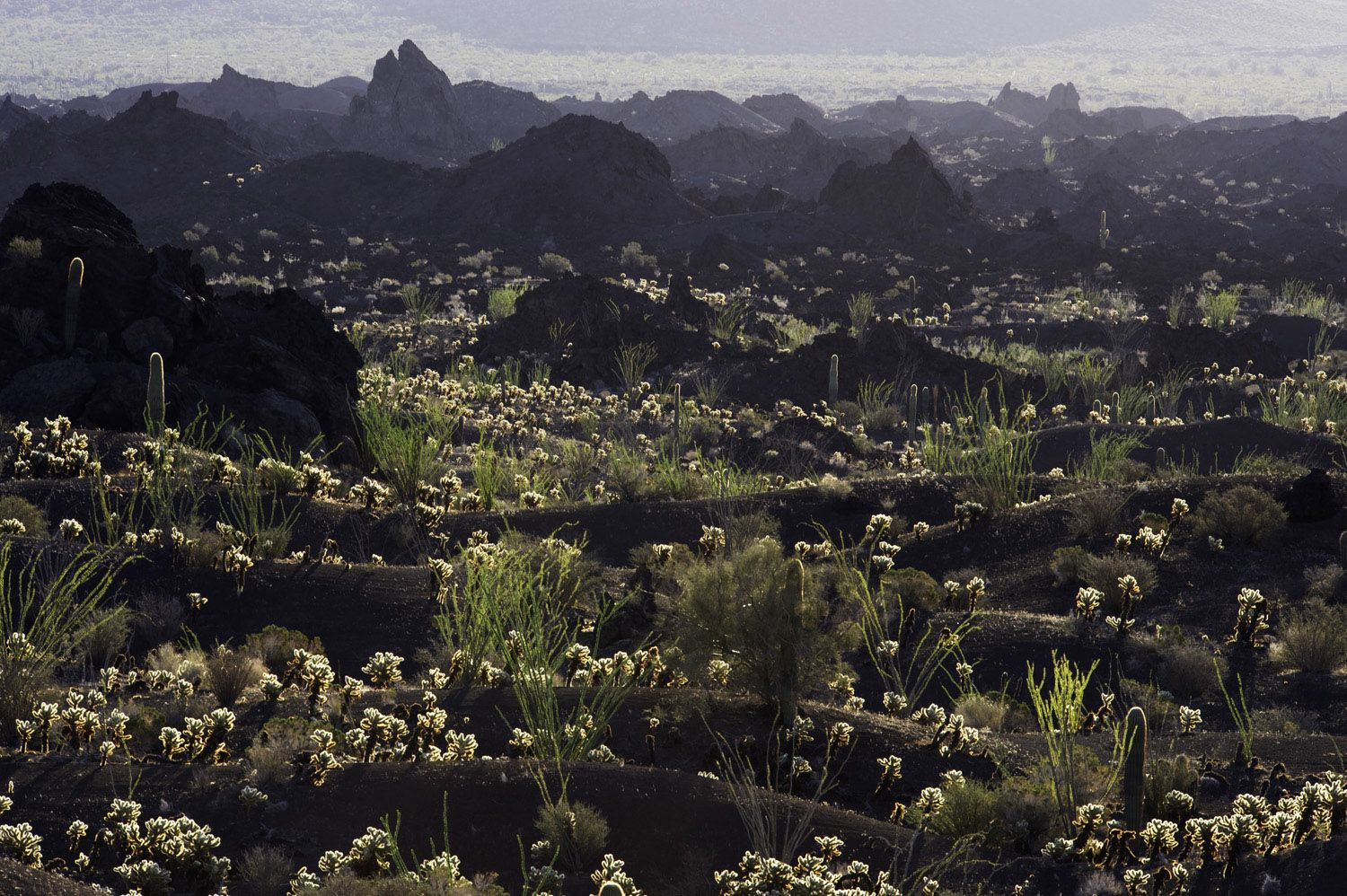
Pinacate volcanics with teddy-bear chollas, ocotillos, young saguaros, and a paloverde tree

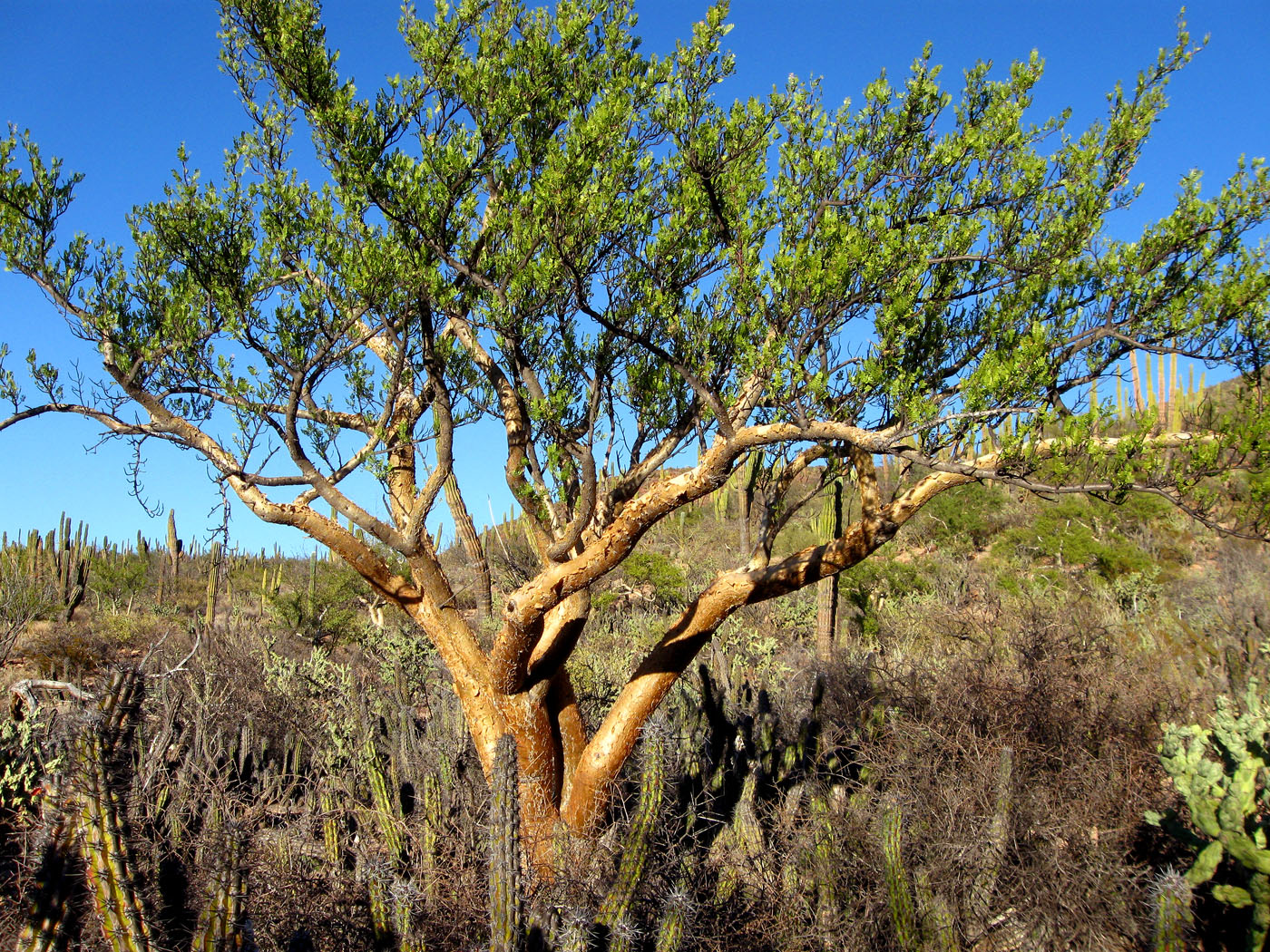
Bursera microphylla, Elephant Tree, photographed at Cerro Colorado in Baja California, Mexico.

The Pinacate Peaks (Sierra Pinacate) are a group of volcanic peaks and cinder cones located mostly in the Mexican state of Sonora along the international border adjacent to the U.S. state of Arizona, surrounded by the vast sand dune field of the Gran Desierto de Altar, at the desert's southeast.

The Spanish name for the Pinacate Peaks geographic feature is the Sierra Pinacate, which is used in their homeland of Mexico.

== Location ==
The Pinacate Peaks lie just north of the fishing resort of Puerto Peñasco. The tallest of the peaks is Cerro del Pinacate (also called Volcan Santa Clara), with an elevation of 3,904 feet (1,190 m). The Mexican Spanish word pinacate is derived from the Nahuatl word for the endemic desert stink beetle, pinacatl.

== Natural history ==
=== Geology ===
The volcanoes here have erupted sporadically since about 4 million years ago, probably in association with the opening of the Gulf of California. The most recent volcanic activity was about 11,000 years ago. The Pinacate Desert is home to the largest sand dunes in the Americas.

=== Flora and fauna ===
A variety of flora and fauna occur in the Pinacate Mountains, including the sculptural elephant tree (Bursera microphylla) and the endangered Sonoran pronghorn (Antilocapra americana sonoriensis).

== Human history ==
Padre Eusebio Kino, the founder of many Spanish missions in the Sonoran Desert, explored here in 1698 and several times later.

NASA sent astronauts here starting in 1965 for geologic training, given the similarity of the terrain to the lunar surface, and included training models of lunar surface equipment. Apollo 14's Alan Shepard and Ed Mitchell, and Apollo 17's Jack Schmitt trained here in Feb. 1970.

== El Pinacate y Gran Desierto de Altar Biosphere Reserve ==
The El Pinacate y Gran Desierto de Altar Biosphere Reserve is a biosphere reserve, in the Spanish language Reserva de la Biosfera el Pinacate y Gran Desierto de Altar, managed by the Mexican Federal Government's SEMARNAT – the Ministry of the Environment and Natural Resources, in collaboration with the government of the State of Sonora's IMADES agency.

=== The reserve ===
Facts about the reserve:

- Over 600 square miles (1,600 km^{2})
- Over 400 cinder cones (caused by volcanic activity)
- 9 massive volcanic craters
- Remains of volcanic activity (ash, basalt rock, lava fields)
- Over 560 plant species
- 56 mammal species
- 43 reptile species
- 222 bird species
- 4 fish species.

== See also ==
- List of volcanoes in Mexico
- El Elegante Crater
