= El Elegante Crater =

Maar in Sonora, Mexico

Coordinates: 31.8467°N 113.3913°W

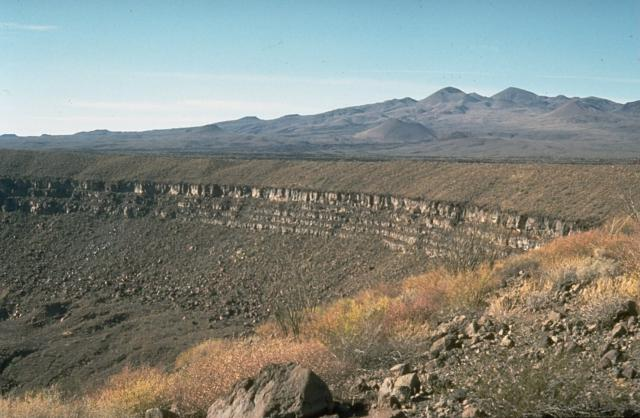
Crater walls of El Elegante, seen from the rim.

El Elegante (Spanish for elegant one) is a maar (a type of volcanic crater) located in the Gran Desierto de Altar in the Sonoran Desert, Mexico.

At 250 metres (820 ft) deep and 1.5 kilometres (0.93 mi) across, it is the largest in the volcanic complex of Pinacate Peaks.

== Formation ==
The crater was formed about 32,000 years ago when groundwater seeping down into the earth came into contact with magma rising from beneath the crust. The hot magma instantly turned the water to steam, and the sudden high pressure triggered a phreatomagmatic explosion, blowing a huge hole in the ground, and blasting out rocks, magmatic material and ash, forming the crater. Ejecta was spread out to a distance of about 30 kilometres (19 mi) from the crater over what is now the desert floor. The crater rim is higher than the surrounding desert and shows layers of rock built up from the ejecta.

El Elegante contained a lake during the pluvial period preceding the last altithermal period.

== Biosphere Reserve ==
The crater is located in an important area and nature reserve called El Pinacate y Gran Desierto de Altar Biosphere Reserve, which was declared a World Heritage Site by UNESCO in 2012. It functions as a natural park; El Elegante is the crater most visited by tourists.
