= Arizona Highways =

Travelogue and artistic photograph magazine

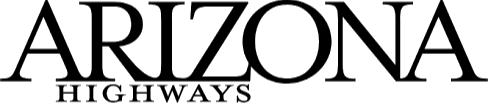
- Frequency: Monthly
- First issue: July 1921; April 15, 1925
- Company: Arizona Department of Transportation
- Based in: Phoenix, Arizona
- Website: arizonahighways.com
- ISSN: 0004-1521

Arizona Highways is a magazine that contains travelogues and artistic photographs related to the U.S. state of Arizona. It is published monthly in Phoenix by a unit of the Arizona Department of Transportation (ADOT).

== Background ==
The magazine began in July 1921 by the Arizona Highway Department (now the Arizona Department of Transportation) as a 10-page pamphlet designed to promote "the development of good roads throughout the state." Publication of the pamphlet ended on December 30, 1922, after nine issues. The publication was relaunched on April 15, 1925, as a regular magazine. In addition to the engineering articles, cartoons and travelogues were also included in the early issues. Over the next two decades the magazine reduced, and then stopped, inclusion of the road engineering articles and dedicated itself to the present format of travel tales, historical stories, and humor about the state of Arizona (including stories about Arizona's contribution to the history of the Old West), always enhanced by the now-legendary photography. This transition began largely under the watch of Raymond Carlson, who began as editor in 1938 and served until 1971; under his leadership the magazine stopped accepting advertisements and developed the editorial tone and style for which it is best known to the present day.

Arizona Highways has been well known for documenting the Native American people of Arizona and the Southwest, especially the Navajo, the Hopi and Apache; this includes stories and photos of life on the reservations, and centuries-old Native ceremonies such as the "sunrise dance" of the Apache. (Future U.S. Senator and 1964 presidential candidate Barry Goldwater first became known in the late 1930s for his photographs of Native American life in Arizona, as well as other scenic landscapes such as the Grand Canyon, published in the pages of Arizona Highways.) From time to time, special issues would be devoted to major places of interest in Arizona, such as the Phoenix and Tucson areas (as well as each of Arizona's major state-run universities), and the Grand Canyon. In selected issues, destinations in the Southwest outside of Arizona have been featured, including Bryce Canyon National Park in southern Utah. Several issues have been devoted exclusively to Mexico, documenting places of historical interest and natural beauty (including the border town of Nogales), accessible to Arizonans via a relatively short drive south of the border.

In the mid-1960s, there were reports that Arizona Highways had been designated as "subversive literature", despite being non-political, and subsequently banned by the authorities of various countries in the Eastern Bloc, including East Germany and the Soviet Union. Arizona Highways states that the reason the magazine was banned was because the magazine was believed to propagandize life in America.

Arizona Highways promoted the art of Ettore "Ted" DeGrazia, showcasing his artwork especially in their December issues. Beginning in the 1950s, the December issue became known as "Arizona's Christmas card to the world" as it was for many years the only issue of the year produced in full color, allowing for many dramatic and awe-inspiring color shots of the Arizona landscape, from the desert regions of the central and southern portions of the state to the snow-covered pine forests of Flagstaff and other northern areas. Arizona Highways began printing all issues in full color by the mid-1980s.

In 1946, photographer Ansel Adams started to contribute prints for the magazine. Photographs include "Arches, North Court, Mission San Xavier del Bac, Tucson, Arizona, 1968" and "Saguaro Cactus, Sunrise, Arizona, 1942". Since this time, the magazine has become known for its photography, often compared favorably with that of National Geographic and similar travel magazines. Three generations of the Muench family contributed landscape photographs to Arizona Highways: Josef Muench, an immigrant from Bavaria, whose first photos appeared in the late 1930s; son David Muench, who assisted his father as a teenager (his first of many Arizona Highways covers appeared in January 1955 when he was eighteen, and whose style became a standard followed by several later photographers for the magazine); and David's son Marc Muench, who became a fixture in Arizona Highways' pages starting in the 1980s. Pulitzer Prize-winning photojournalist Jack Dykinga has been a frequent contributor, as has been Jerry Jacka, known for not only landscapes but for his photos of the historic and contemporary art (and people) of Arizona's Native American communities. Five separate issues of Arizona Highways have been devoted entirely to Jacka's work.

Today, Arizona Highways' monthly circulation surpasses 200,000 copies, with readers in 50 U.S. states and in two-thirds of the world's countries.

Although known primarily for its magazine, Arizona Highways also publishes books, calendars, and other Arizona-related products. Arizona Highways TV, which showcases many of the Arizona locations covered in the magazine, began production in 2004, hosted by former KNXV co-anchor Robin Sewell.

== Notable contributors to Arizona Highways ==
- Ansel Adams
- Charles Bowden
- Jack Dykinga
- Carlos Elmer
- Barry Goldwater
- Esther Henderson
- Ray Manley
- Ross Santee
