= David Muench =

American photographer

David Muench (born June 25, 1936) is an American landscape and nature photographer known for portraying the American western landscape. He is the primary photographer for more than 60 books and his work appears in many magazines, posters, and private collections.

== Career ==
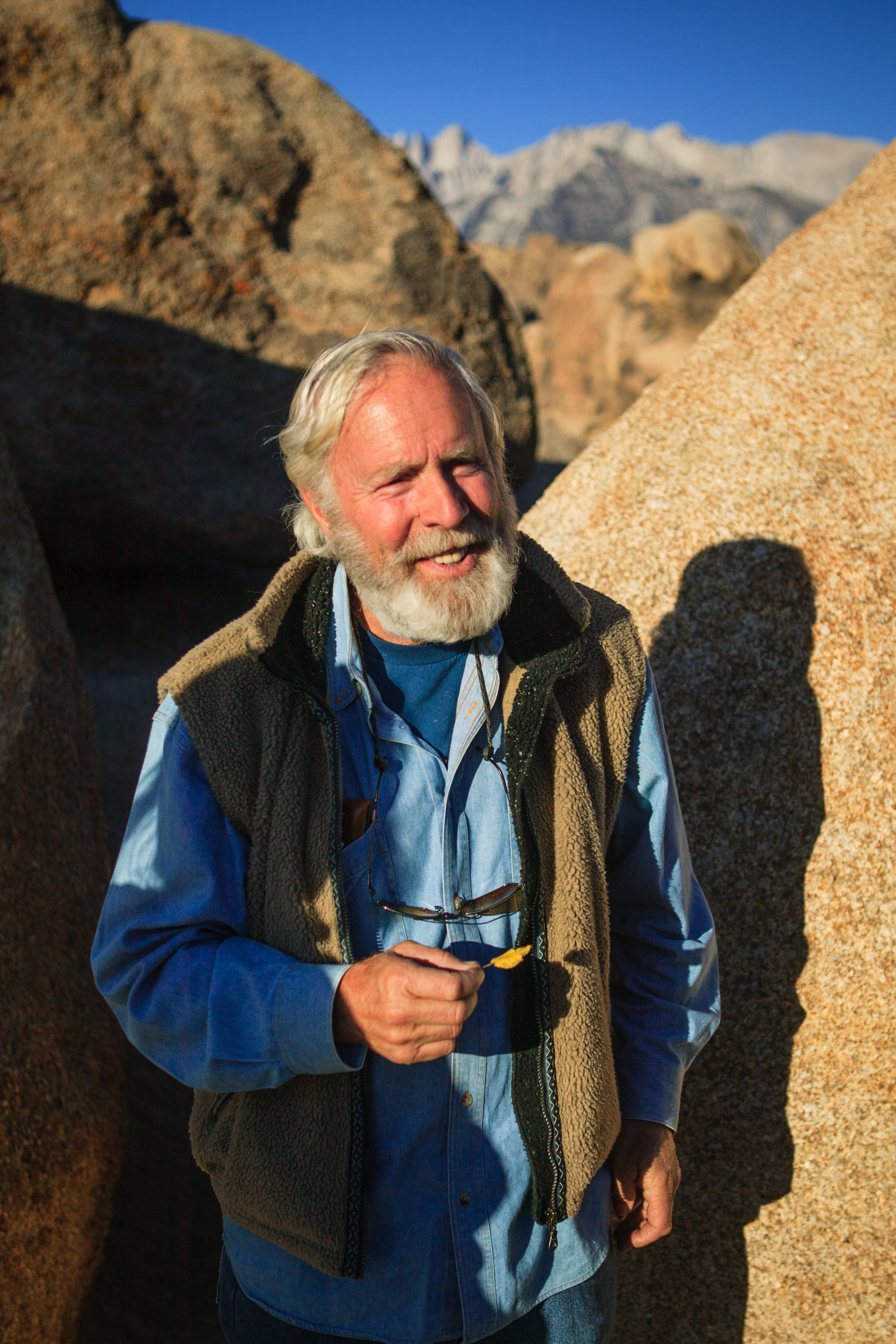
David Muench photographed in 2004.

Muench was born on June 25, 1936, in Santa Barbara, California. Muench has been a freelance photographer since the 1950s with his formal schooling including the Rochester Institute of Technology, Rochester, New York, The University of California at Santa Barbara and the Art Center School of Design, Los Angeles.

His first Arizona Highways cover was published in January 1955 at the age of 18, and he has continued to work with the magazine since then. In December 2015, to celebrate seven decades of collaboration, Arizona Highways dedicated an entire issue of the magazine to Muench, the first time they had done so for a single person.

At the recommendation of Ansel Adams, more than 200 images by Muench are archived in the collection of the Center for Creative Photography. Although he has done a few exhibits, Muench chose the coffee table book as the main vehicle for his photography. He is the author of more than 60 books.

In 1975, Muench was commissioned by the National Park Service to photograph 33 large murals on the Lewis and Clark Expedition for the Jefferson National Expansion Memorial in St. Louis, Missouri, including 350 smaller photographs to accompany the murals. In 2000, Muench received the National Parks Conservation Association's Robin W. Winks Award for Enhancing Public Understanding of National Parks.

== Style ==
Muench's classic work consists mostly of wild landscapes photographed with a 4×5 film camera. His signature compositional technique is the near-far wide-angle view where a carefully selected foreground ties in with the background. He also paid particular attention to the "timeless moments", times of transition such as sunrise, sunsets, and the edge of storms. Other innovations in landscape photography include the use of telephoto lenses, fill light and in-camera double exposures.

== Personal life ==
Muench is the son of nature photographer Joseph Muench (born in Schweinfurt, Bavaria) who inspired him to become a nature photographer. Muench has two children. His son, Marc Muench, is a successful photographer in his own right, specializing in landscape and outdoor action photography. His daughter, Zandria, is a freelance photographer, specializing in animals, nature, and landscape. In 1997, the Muench family received NANPA's Lifetime Achievement in Nature Photography Award.
