= Cabeza Prieta Wilderness =

Protected area in the Sonoran Desert, Arizona

- IUCN category Ib (wilderness area)

- Location within the United States
- Location: Cabeza Prieta National Wildlife Refuge, Arizona, United States
- Nearest city: Yuma, AZ
- Coordinates: 32°16′5″N 113°25′11″W
- Area: 803,418 acres (3,251.32 km^{2})
- Established: 1990
- Governing body: U.S. Fish and Wildlife Service

The Cabeza Prieta Wilderness is located in the Sonoran Desert in southwestern Arizona in the United States. Cabeza Prieta Wilderness Area has the distinction of being Arizona's largest Wilderness Area, encompassing nearly 93 percent of the Cabeza Prieta National Wildlife Refuge and covering 803,418 acres (3,251.32 km^{2}), larger than the land area of the state of Rhode Island. It may be temporarily closed for training exercises of the Barry M. Goldwater Air Force Range.

It is also the reputed burial ground of famed environmentalist and author Edward Abbey.

Visitors to Cabeza Prieta Wilderness are advised to avoid touching or tampering with any undetonated bombs, and no vehicle travel is permitted off of designated public use roads.

== See also ==
- List of Arizona Wilderness Areas
- List of U.S. Wilderness Areas
- Wilderness Act
- Category: Protected areas of the Sonoran Desert

== Images ==
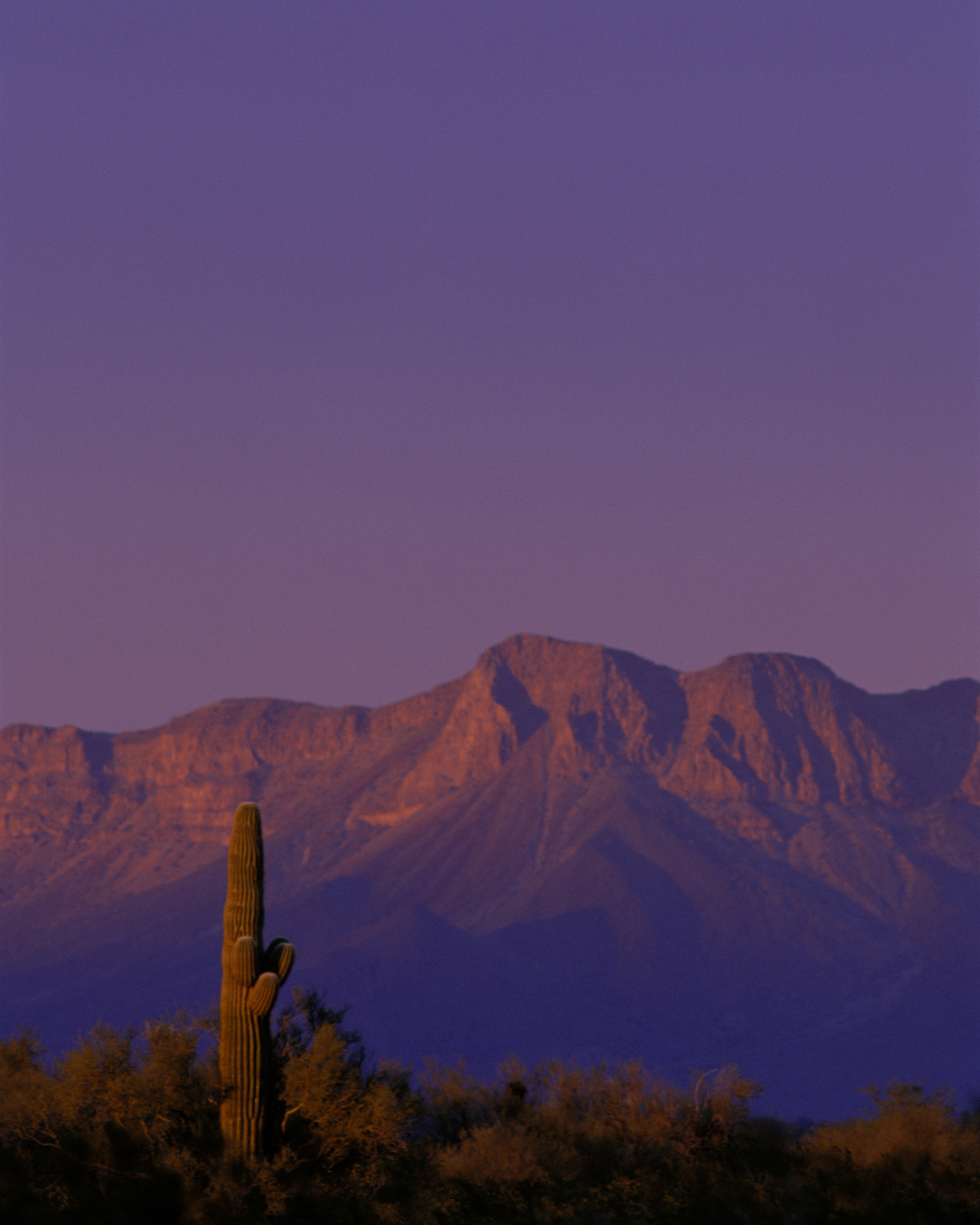

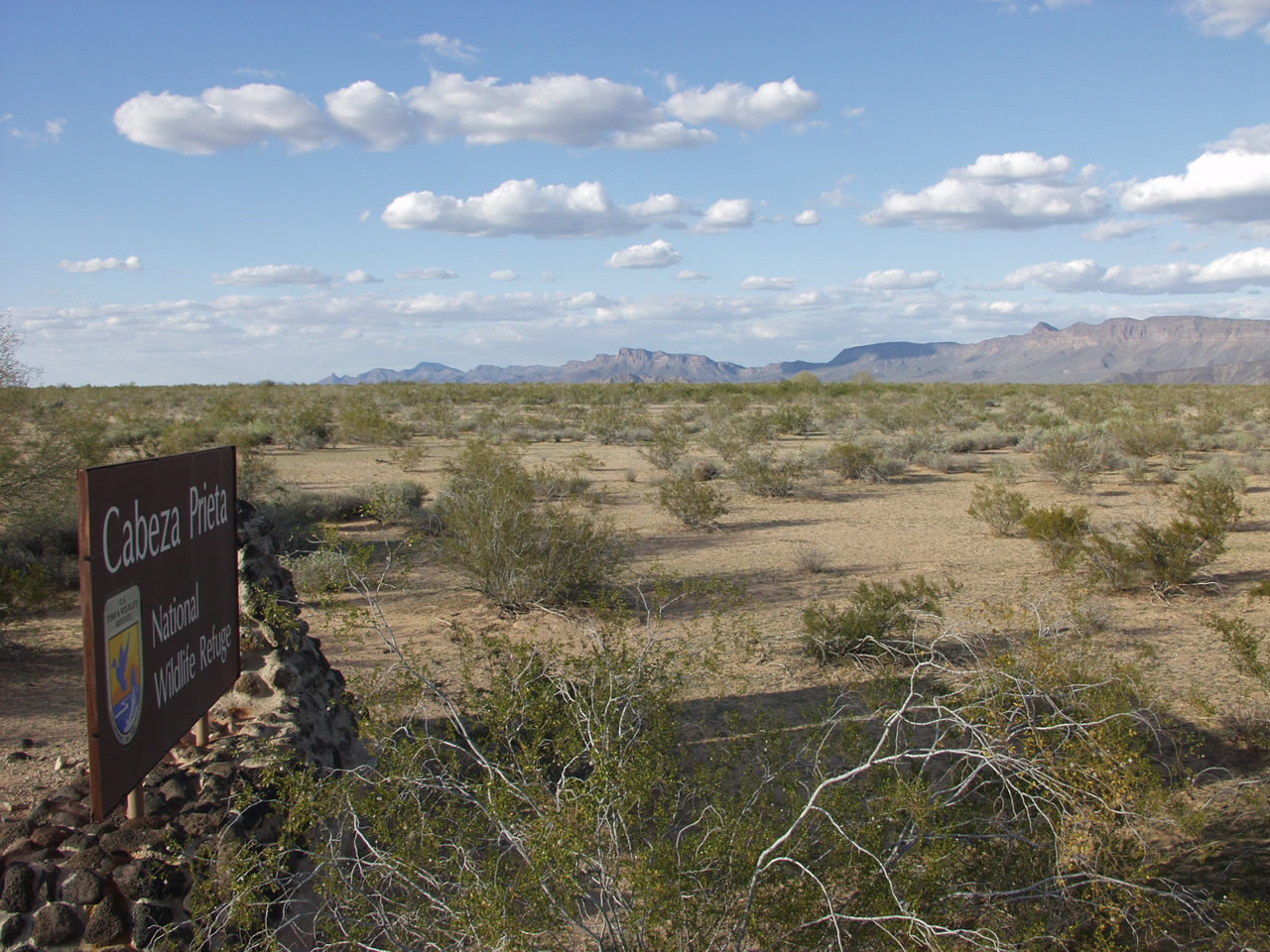
