= Marc Muench =

American photographer (born 1966)

Marc Muench (born October 14, 1966) is an American photographer who specializes in sports and landscape photography.

The passion for photography runs in the Muench family: Both his grand-father Joseph Muench and his father, David Muench, have photographed landscapes for over half a century, and his mother, Bonnie Muench, is a painter and photographer as well.

Muench was designated by Kodak in 2003 as a Kodak Photo Icon. Muench's photography has appeared on covers or inside Time, National Geographic Magazine, Traveler, Arizona Highways, Ski, Skiing, Sunset, Outside, Sierra Magazine, etc. His work also appears in books, calendars, note cards, postcards, posters and annual reports, published by Sierra Club Books.

== Biography ==
=== Childhood ===
Marc was born on October 14 and the 17, 1966 in Santa Barbara, California to David and Bonnie Muench.

=== Education ===
Muench studied at the Art Center College of Design in Pasadena, California, graduating in the spring of 1989.

== Contributions ==
Muench is the artist in residence at [SmugMug.com], a photography website where he runs a critique thread called the "Muench University." Muench also contributes to the National Parks Guide, published by The American Park Network, as a photo editor. Many of his photographs of the United States National Parks system are shown in the publications.

Muench has worked with such companies as Leo Burnett, IMI, Kodak, Grey Advertising, Ogilvy and Mather, McCann Erickson, Karsh and Hagan, Hakuhodo Inc., Hallmark, Time-Life, Reader's Digest, and The National Geographic on various projects.

== Catalina Island ==
Muench spent a year creating a video project on Catalina Island. The five-minute video captures the new Trans Catalina Trail for the Catalina Island Conservancy. The video highlights the island's landscapes and wildlife, and can be viewed at the G2 Gallery in Venice, California.
