= Ray Manley =

American photographer (1921–2006)

Ray Manley (September 4, 1921 in Cottonwood, Arizona – July 15, 2006 in Tucson, Arizona) was an American photographer whose photographs of Arizona helped increase tourism and migration to Arizona.

== Early life ==
During his early years, as writer David Leighton shared in Arizona Highways magazine, "Manley grew up in the Verde Valley, a virtual playground of wonder for a boy who loved the outdoors. He fished with his father in Oak Creek Canyon, camped near the Verde River and climbed the ladders to Montezuma Castle to explore its upper rooms." Manley took an early interest in photography and began taking pictures in grade school and later as a Boy Scout, earned a merit badge for his photographic work. At Clarkdale High School using a World War I Signal Corp camera he took pictures for the school's yearbook.

He attended Arizona State College (now Northern Arizona University) at Flagstaff with the intention of becoming a science teacher and this is where he also met his future wife Ruth, who was a student. During his time in college, he saw a picture by noted Arizona photographer Esther Henderson, which inspired him to take photography more seriously. He purchased a 4x5 view camera and took several photos in the Flagstaff area. He submitted the images to Arizona Highways in the off chance one might be accepted. His picture of the San Francisco Peaks was purchased by the publication in 1940 but not run until about four years later.

== Career ==
During World War II, he enlisted in the Navy and ended up being an instructor at the Navy's photography school in Pensacola, Florida. After his discharge, he moved to Los Angeles, California to attend the Art Center School, but was disappointed with its educational criteria and decided to move his young family to Tucson, Arizona, in order to work for Western Ways, an independent photo-and-story producing outfit.

One of his first jobs as a commercial photographer was photographing Dr. Lytle S. Adams' Pellet Seeding Operations on the Hopi, Papago and Navajo Reservations in 1944–1949. He took hundreds of photos for the purpose of promoting and advertising Adams' invention. During this time Adams and Ray became good friends. in 1963 the Adam East Museum in Moses Lake, Washington asked Dr. for a portrait of him as Dr. Adams built the Museum. Ray volunteered to make the portrait for free in thanks for all that Dr. Adams did for him at the start of his career. The Portrait hung in the Adam East Museum until it was moved and now hangs in the new Adam East Museum.

In 1954, he and professional partner Naurice "Reese" Koonce, who had worked together at Western Ways, opened Ray Manley Commercial Photography on Broadway Boulevard in Tucson. Later on, Manley would build a new and more spacious studio on Tucson Boulevard and take on an additional partner Mickey Prim.

Manley's favorite place to photograph was Monument Valley. He asked a Navajo girl there to call him when it snowed because he wanted to photograph it. She did, more than once, but by the time he could get there, the snow had melted. He kept persisting, finally pleading that she should call him when the snow "gets up to your knees". One morning she called and told Manley the snow was up to her knees. He arrived in time and took some excellent pictures for Arizona Highways magazine.

Another time, Manley was attempting to photograph Rome's Colosseum, when he noticed an apartment building nearby, selected a second-story window from which he could get a good photograph and went into the building. He knocked on the door of an apartment and a woman who spoke only Italian opened it, saw his camera and started to close the door. Manley stuck his foot in the doorway and pushed a handful of cash through the opening. Despite language difficulties, an agreement was reached and Manley remained at the window of the apartment for several hours until he got the nighttime image he desired.

Manley traveled to many spots around the world that he wanted to photograph and the images he captured were published in such publications as Life, Look, The Saturday Evening Post, Popular Science, National Geographic and his own books.

The books included The World in Focus, World Travels, Indian Lands and - in partnership with Steve Getzwiller - The Fine Art of Navajo Weaving. He also published many other books on the places and crafts of the Navajo and Hopi.

In the 1970s, Manley opened the Manley Gallery in the lobby of his studio, located on Tucson Boulevard. The Gallery would eventually have its own building on Fort Lowell Road. The same decade saw Manley and his wife Ruth open up a new business initially called Indian Land Tours, which offered guided visits to places Manley had photographed such as Monument Valley and Canyon de Chelly. Its name changed to Ray Manley Tours later on and began offering international tours.

Manley suffered a stroke in 1997 and died in 2006.
