= El Pinacate y Gran Desierto de Altar Biosphere Reserve =

UNESCO biosphere reserve in Sonora, Mexico

Reserva de la Biosfera El Pinacate y Gran Desierto de Altar
- IUCN category Ia (strict nature reserve)
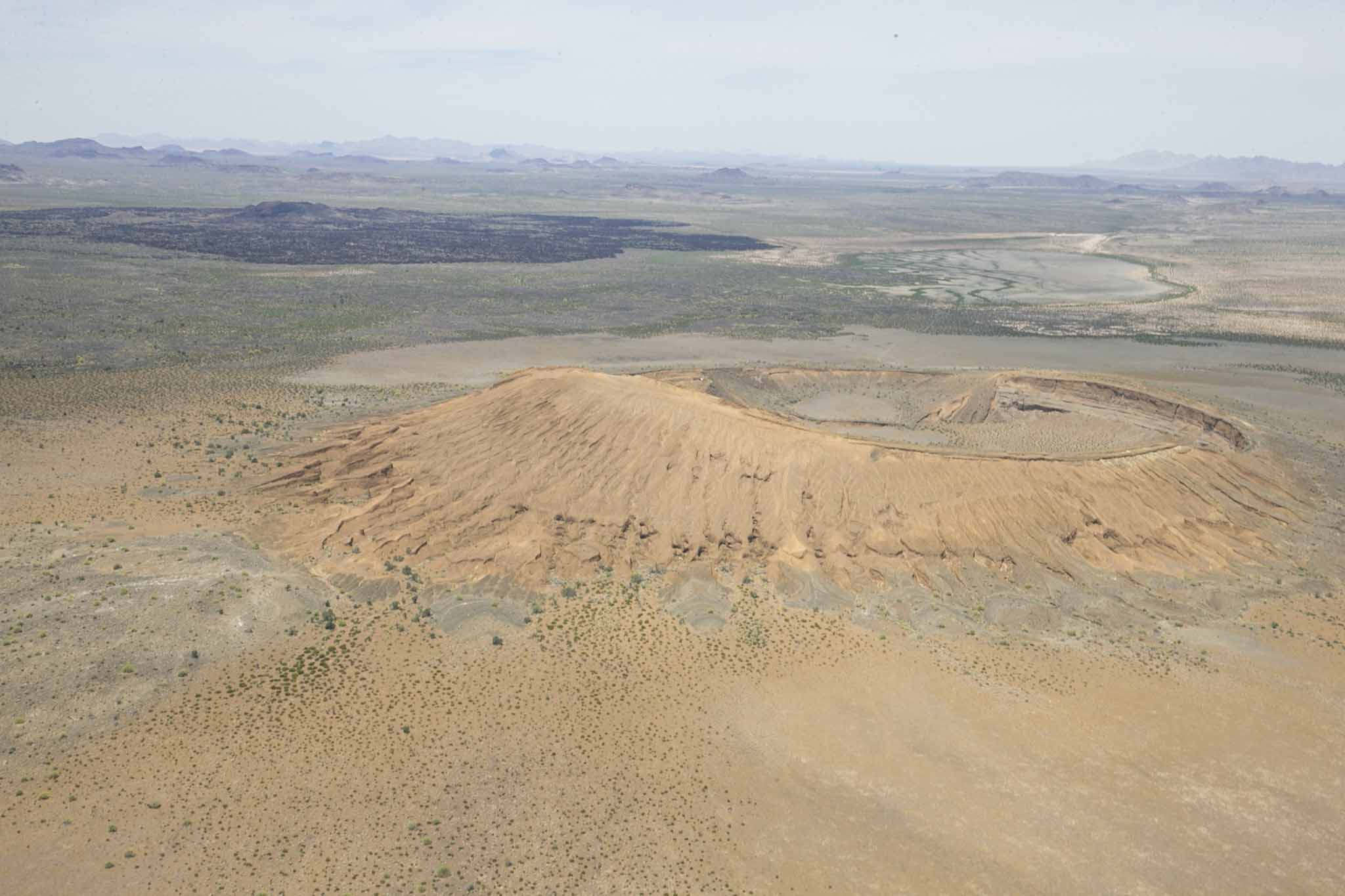
- Aerial view of El Pinacate y Gran Desierto de Altar Biosphere Reserve and adjacent volcano with black lava flows

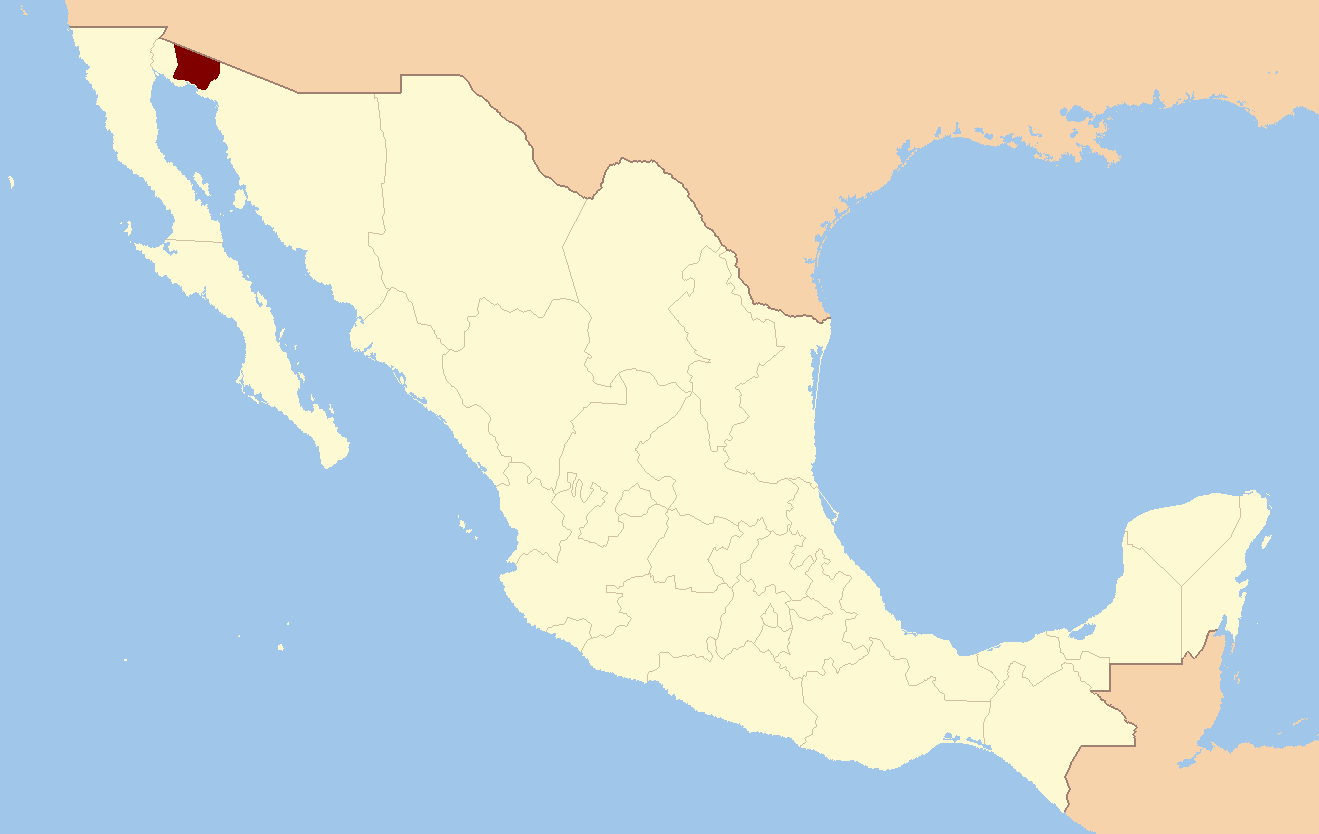
- Location of the Reserve in Mexico
- Location: Sonora, Mexico
- Nearest city: Puerto Peñasco; Sonoyta; San Luis Río Colorado
- Coordinates: 32°00′N 113°55′W
- Area: 2,695.05 km^{2} (1,040.56 sq mi)
- Established: June 10, 1993
- Governing body: Instituto Nacional de Ecología and Tohono O'odham
- Website: elpinacate.com.mx

UNESCO World Heritage Site
- Official name: El Pinacate and Gran Desierto de Altar Biosphere Reserve
- Type: Natural
- Criteria: vii, viii, x
- Designated: 2013 (37th session)
- Reference no.: 1410
- Region: Latin America and the Caribbean

Ramsar Wetland
- Official name: Agua Dulce
- Designated: 2 February 2008
- Reference no.: 1813

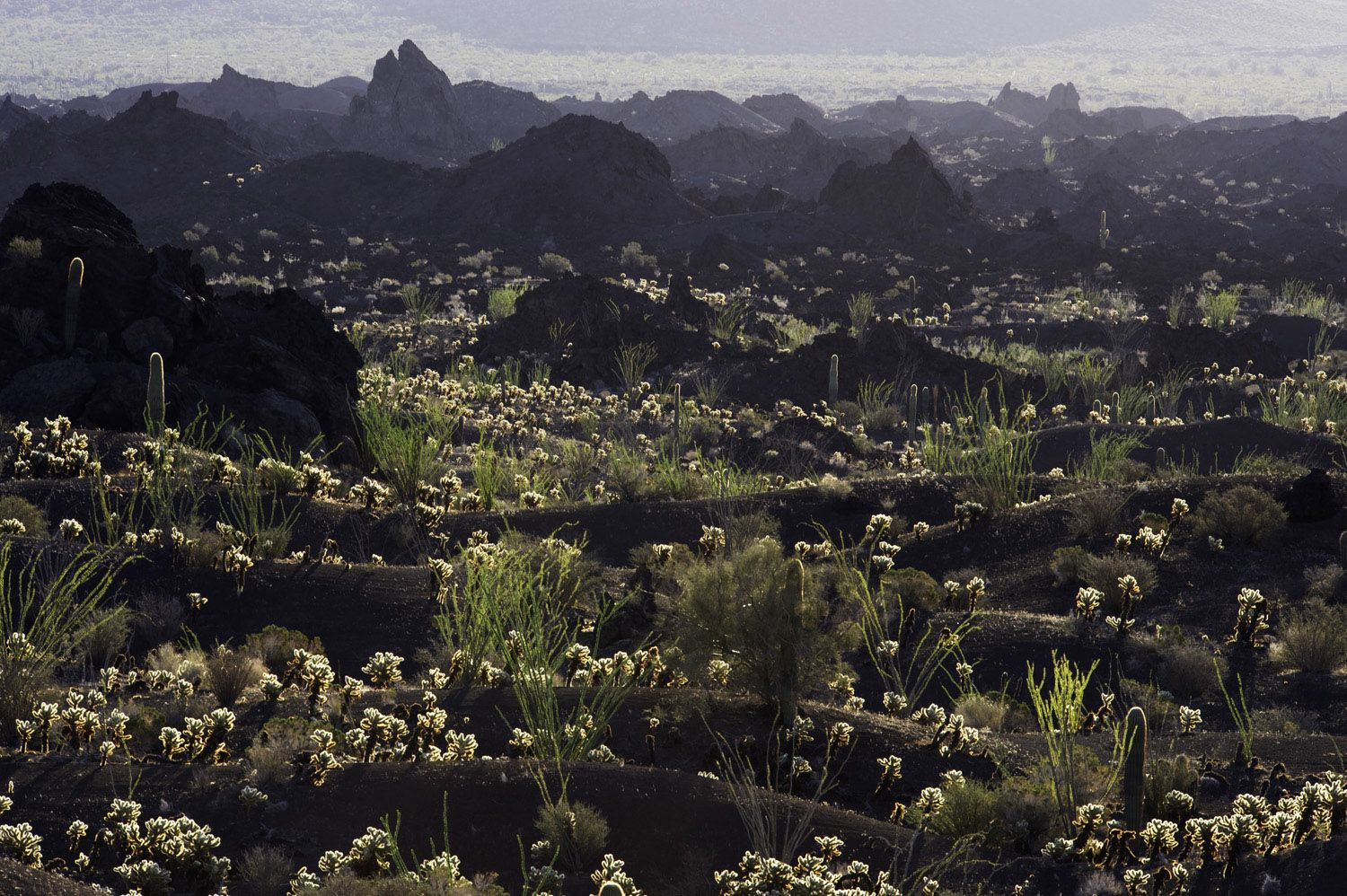
Pinacate volcanics with teddy-bear chollas, ocotillos, young saguaros, and a palo verde tree. Photo by Jack Dykinga.

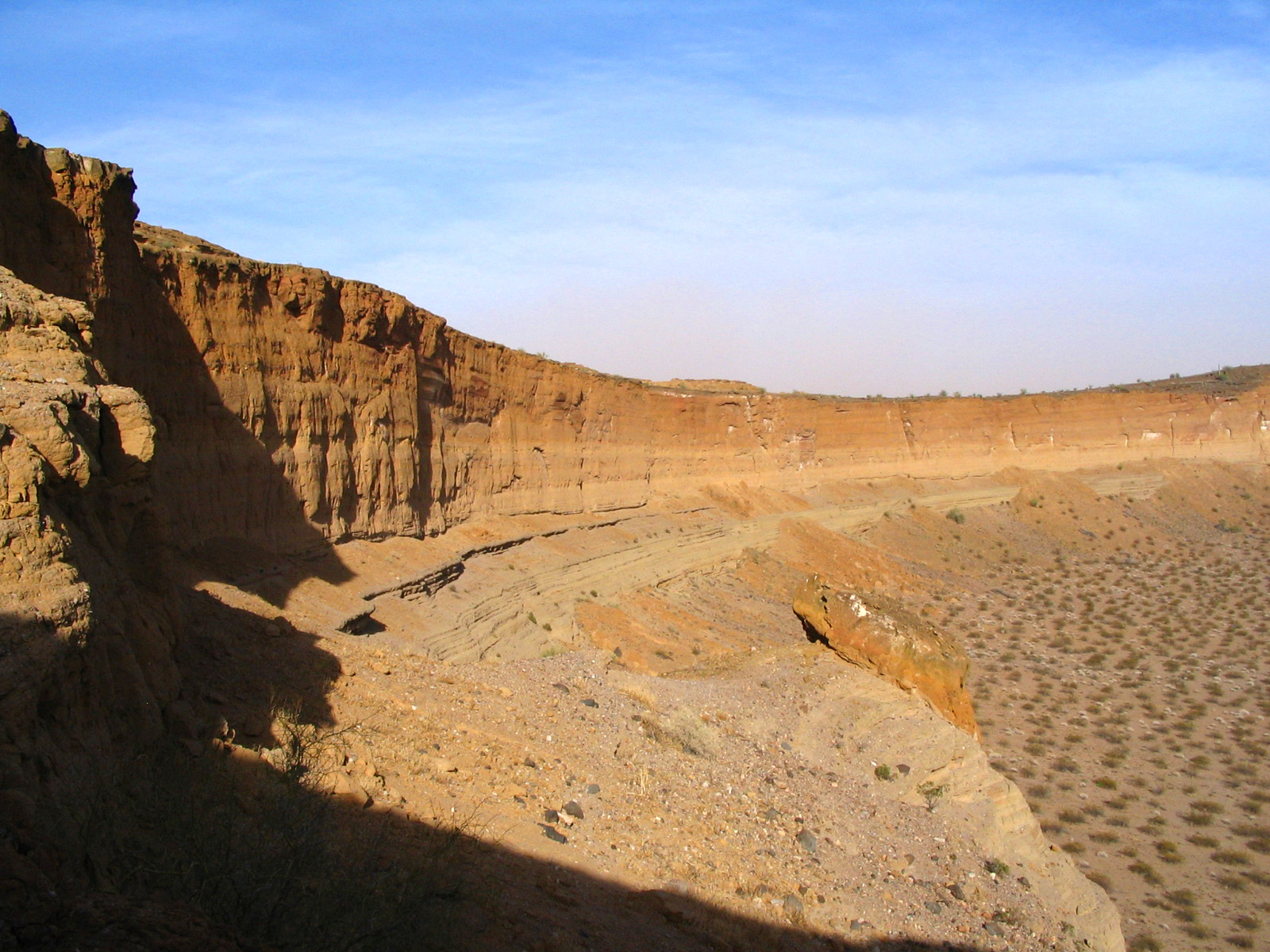
Crater Elegante

El Pinacate and Gran Desierto de Altar Biosphere Reserve (Spanish: Reserva de la Biosfera El Pinacate y Gran Desierto de Altar) is a biosphere reserve and UNESCO World Heritage Site managed by the federal government of Mexico, specifically by Secretariat of the Environment and Natural Resources, in collaboration with the state governments of Sonora and the Tohono O'odham.

It is in the Sonoran Desert in northwest Mexico, east of the Gulf of California, in the eastern part of the Gran Desierto de Altar, just south of the border with Arizona, United States and north of the city of Puerto Peñasco. It is one of the most significant visible landforms in North America seen from space. A volcanic system known as Santa Clara is the main part of the landscape, including three peaks: Pinacate, Carnegie and Medio. It is a sister park to Organ Pipe Cactus National Monument in Arizona. Its wildlife is threatened by the militarization of the Mexico–United States border and the construction of the Mexico–United States border wall.

In the area there are over 540 species of plants, 40 species of mammals, 200 of birds, 40 of reptiles, amphibians and freshwater fishes. There are threatened endemic species as Sonoran pronghorn, bighorn sheep, gila monster and desert tortoise.

The biosphere reserve covers an area of 2,695.05 square kilometres (1,040.56 mi^{2}), making up about half of the World Heritage site. The extent of the World Heritage site is 7,146 km², greater than that of the states of Aguascalientes, Colima, Morelos and Tlaxcala separated.

== Formation ==
El Pinacate y Gran Desierto de Altar Biosphere Reserve is known for its unique physical and biological characteristics, by the presence of a volcanic shield, and by the extensive areas of active dunes that surround it, and the greatest concentration of Maar craters. The Pinacate Mountains range has orogenic features of high interest, products of volcanic eruptions that accumulated lava in compact rocks, sand and volcanic ashes that formed colors of special beauty, and craters such as El Elegante, Cerro Colorado, MacDougal, and Sykes.

The Pinacate Peaks (Picos del Pinacate), a group of volcanic peaks and cinder cones, are located in the Reserve north of Puerto Peñasco. The highest peak is Cerro del Pinacate (Santa Clara volcano), with an elevation of 1,190 metres (3,904 ft). Pinacate comes from Náhuatl language word pinacatl, for the Pinacate beetle, a stink beetle endemic to the Sonoran Desert.

The Pinacate Peaks volcanoes have erupted sporadically for about 4 million years. The most recent activity was about 11 000 years ago.

NASA sent astronauts to the Gran Desierto de Altar from 1965 to 1970, to train for walking on the Moon, due to the similarities of the terrain to the lunar surface.

== History ==
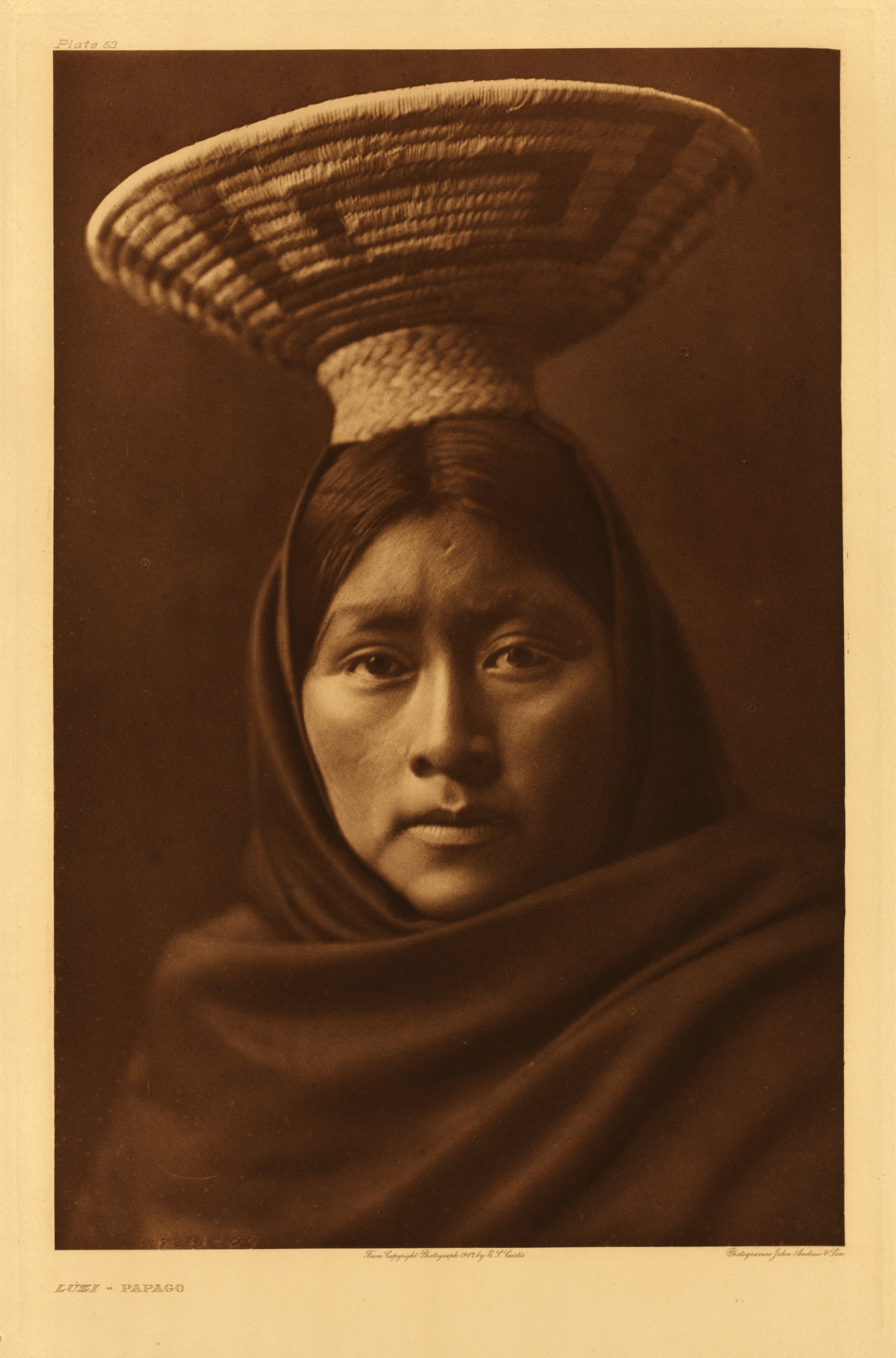
Tohono O'odham woman. Photo by Edward S. Curtis, circa 1907.

=== Pre-Columbian era ===
The first inhabitants are known as San Dieguito people, they were hunter-gatherer who lived off the land, moving from the mountains to the Gulf of California looking for food. The early stages of occupation seem to have ended at the beginning of the ice age about 20000 years ago, when drought forced people to leave the mountain range.

A second stage of occupation by San Dieguito people began in the late glacial period. This group returned to the mountains and lived as their ancestors had. Tinajas must have been a reliable source of water during this time. The second stage of occupation ended with the arrival of an antipyretic period 9000 years ago, which again forced the people to leave the territory.

The most recent indigenous inhabitants of the Pinacate and Gran Desierto de Altar are the Pinacateño band of the Hia C-ed O'odham. Like the prehistoric San Dieguito culture, the Pinacateños roamed the Pinacate all the way to the sea in search of food, concentrating their camps near the tinajas. During these voyages, they left signs of their presence; one example of this is the network of paths that go from tinaja to tinaja, as well as the stone tools and potsherds found near these water sources.

=== Explorations ===
There are few records of those who were the first explorers in this area. Possibly the first European to see the mountain now known as Sierra Pinacate was the explorer Melchior Díaz on 1540. Subsequently, in 1698 the priest Eusebio Kino, founder of Mission San Xavier del Bac in southern Tucson, Arizona, visited the site and returned on several occasions, he and his group climbed to the top of El Pinacate, which was then named Santa Clara Hill.

Before 1956, few scientists and explorers had been in El Pinacate y Gran Desierto de Altar, the most famous, the group MacDougal, Hornaday and Sykes who explored the western part of the mountain in 1907.
