= Jack Dykinga =

American photographer

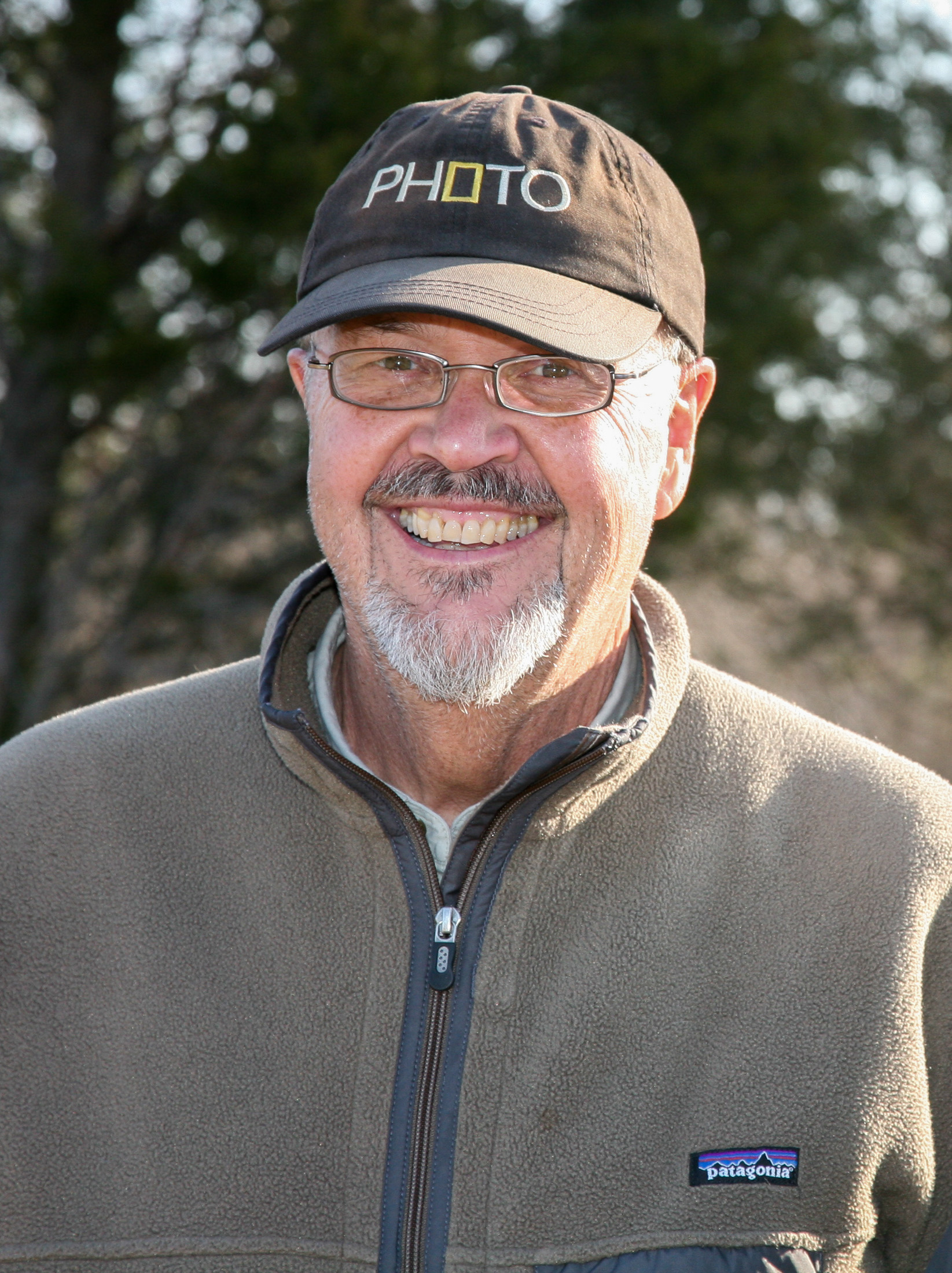
- Dykinga in 2008
- Born: January 2, 1943 (age 83); Chicago, Illinois
- Known for: Photography
- Spouse: Margaret Maley (m. 1965)
- Website: http://www.dykinga.com/

Jack William Dykinga (born January 2, 1943) is an American photographer. For 1970 work with the Chicago Sun-Times he won the annual Pulitzer Prize for Feature Photography citing "dramatic and sensitive photographs at the Lincoln and Dixon State Schools for the Retarded in Illinois."

== Career ==
Born in Chicago, Dykinga began his career at the Chicago Tribune, and the Chicago Sun-Times before moving to Arizona, where he joined the Arizona Daily Star and taught at the University of Arizona and Pima Community College.

Dykinga left the Arizona Daily Star and photojournalism in 1985. Thanks to the support and inspiration of a friend, he started to work on a book about the Sonoran Desert. The publication of The Sonoran Desert launched his new career as a nature and conservation photographer.

Dykinga is a founding Fellow of the International League of Conservation Photographers. His work appears in Arizona Highways and National Geographic. He shows at the G2 Gallery. He is on the board of the Sonoran Desert National Park Project.

In 2010, Dykinga was photographer in residence at Sedona Photofest.

== Personal ==
Dykinga lives in Tucson, Arizona, with his wife Margaret Maley; they married in 1965.

He attended Riverside Brookfield High School.

== Awards and honors ==
- 2010: "Stone Canyon" was selected as one of "40 Best Nature Photographs of all time" by the International League of Conservation Photographers
- 2011: Outstanding Nature Photographer of the Year Award from the North American Nature Photography Association.
- 2017: Lifetime Achievement Award from the North American Nature Photography Association.

== Works ==
- Frog Mountain Blues, University of Arizona Press, 1987, ISBN 978-0-8165-0929-4
- The Sonoran Desert H.N. Abrams, 1992, ISBN 978-0-8109-3824-3
- The Secret Forest, University of New Mexico Press, 1993, ISBN 978-0-8263-1403-1
- Stone Canyons of the Colorado Plateau Abrams, 1996, ISBN 978-0-8109-4468-8
- The Sierra Pinacate University of Arizona Press, 1998, ISBN 978-0-8165-1777-0
- Desert: The Mojave and Death Valley, Harry N. Abrams, 1999, ISBN 978-0-8109-3238-8
- Large format nature photography, Amphoto Books, 2001, ISBN 978-0-8174-4157-9
- Jack Dykinga's Arizona, Westcliffe Publishers, 2004, ISBN 978-1-56579-499-3
- Images: Jack Dykinga's Grand Canyon, Arizona Highways, 2008, ISBN 978-1932082876
- Capture the Magic: Train Your Eye, Improve Your Photographic Composition, Rocky Nook Publishers, 2013, ISBN 978-1937538354
- A Photographer's Life, Rocky Nook Publishers, 2017, ISBN 978-1681980720

== Gallery ==
Photos by Jack Dykinga for the US Department of Agriculture

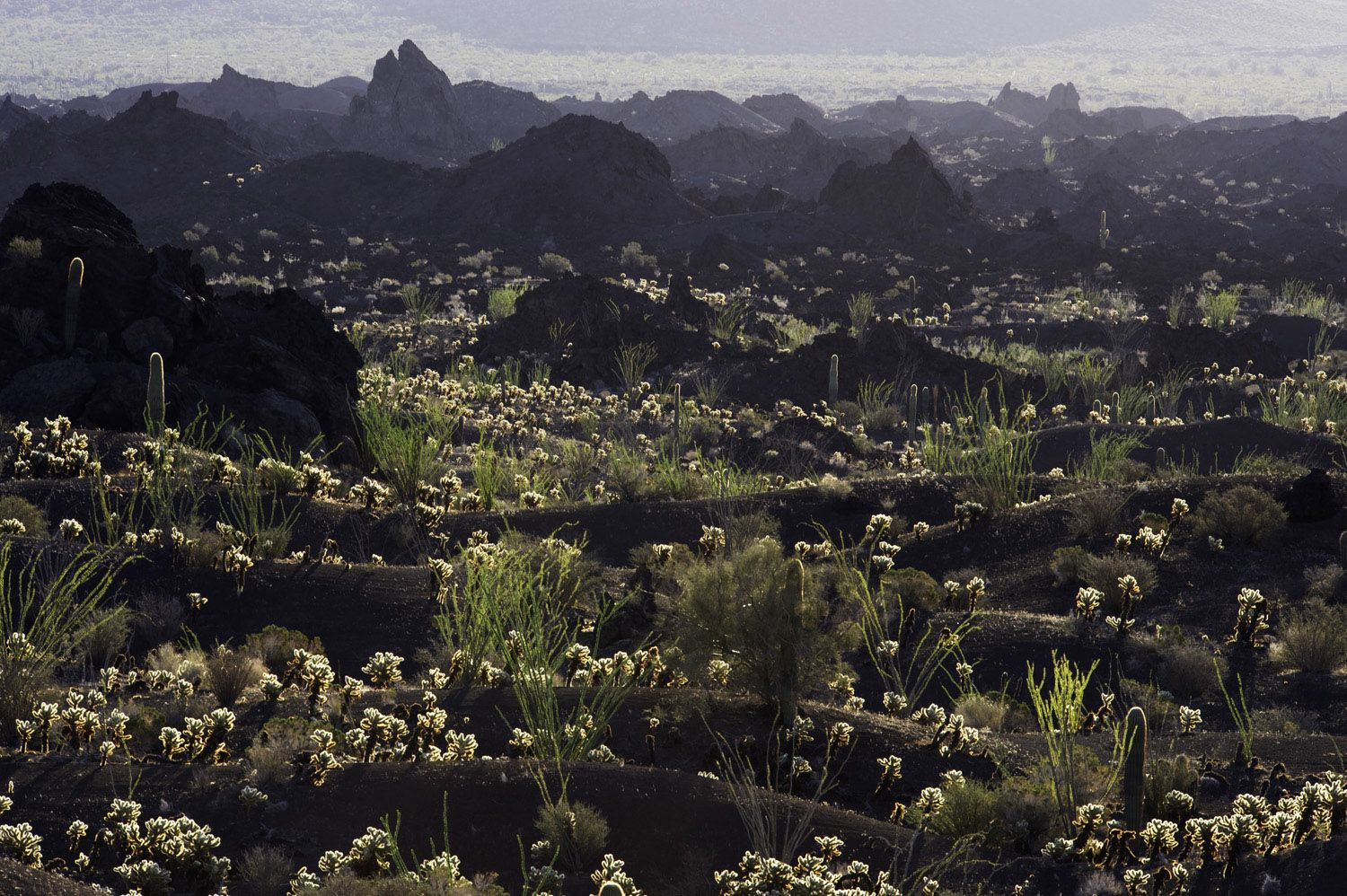
Teddy-bear Cholla at Tecolote Camp, El Pinacate y Gran Desierto de Altar Biosphere Reserve

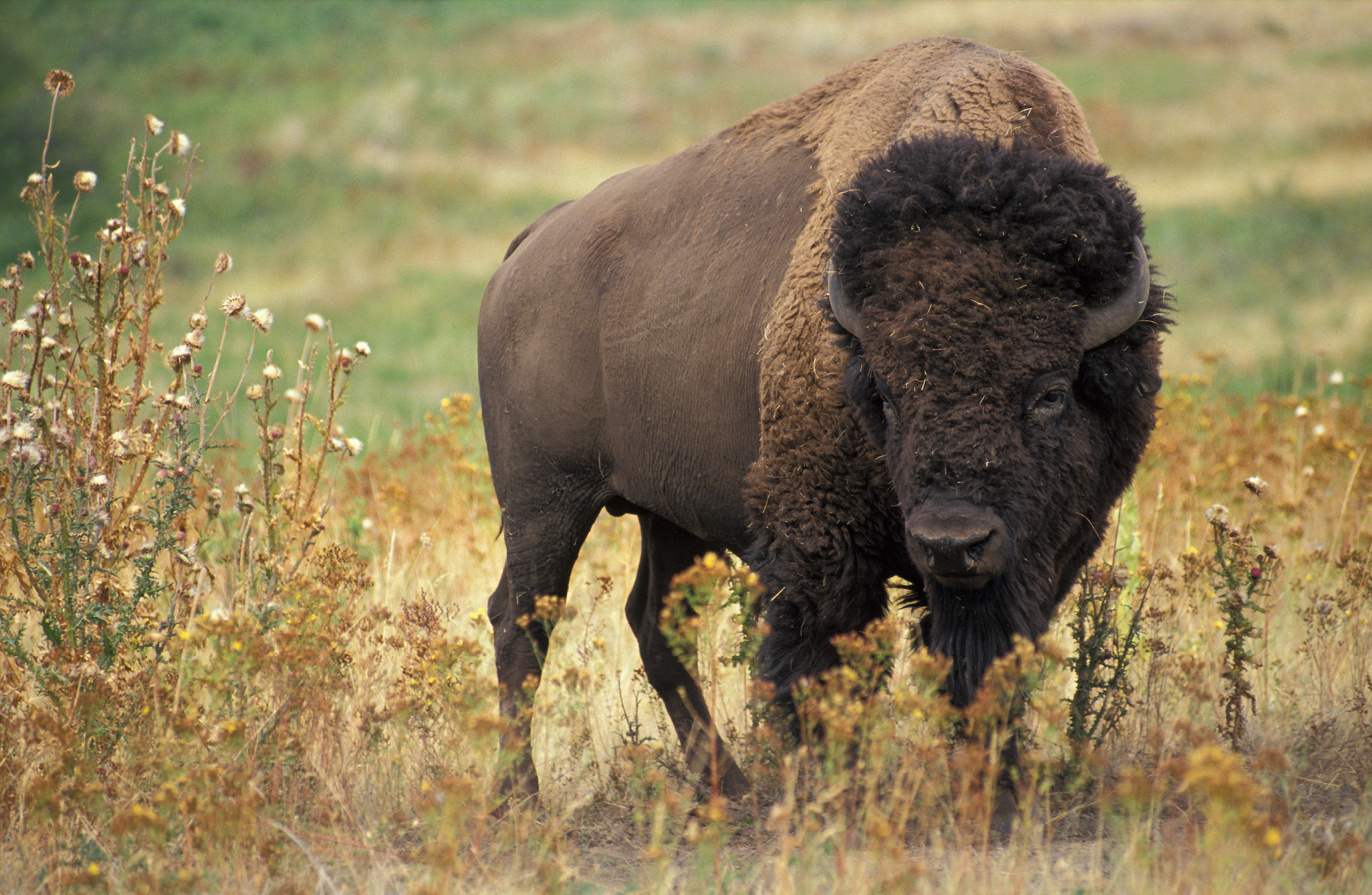
American bison

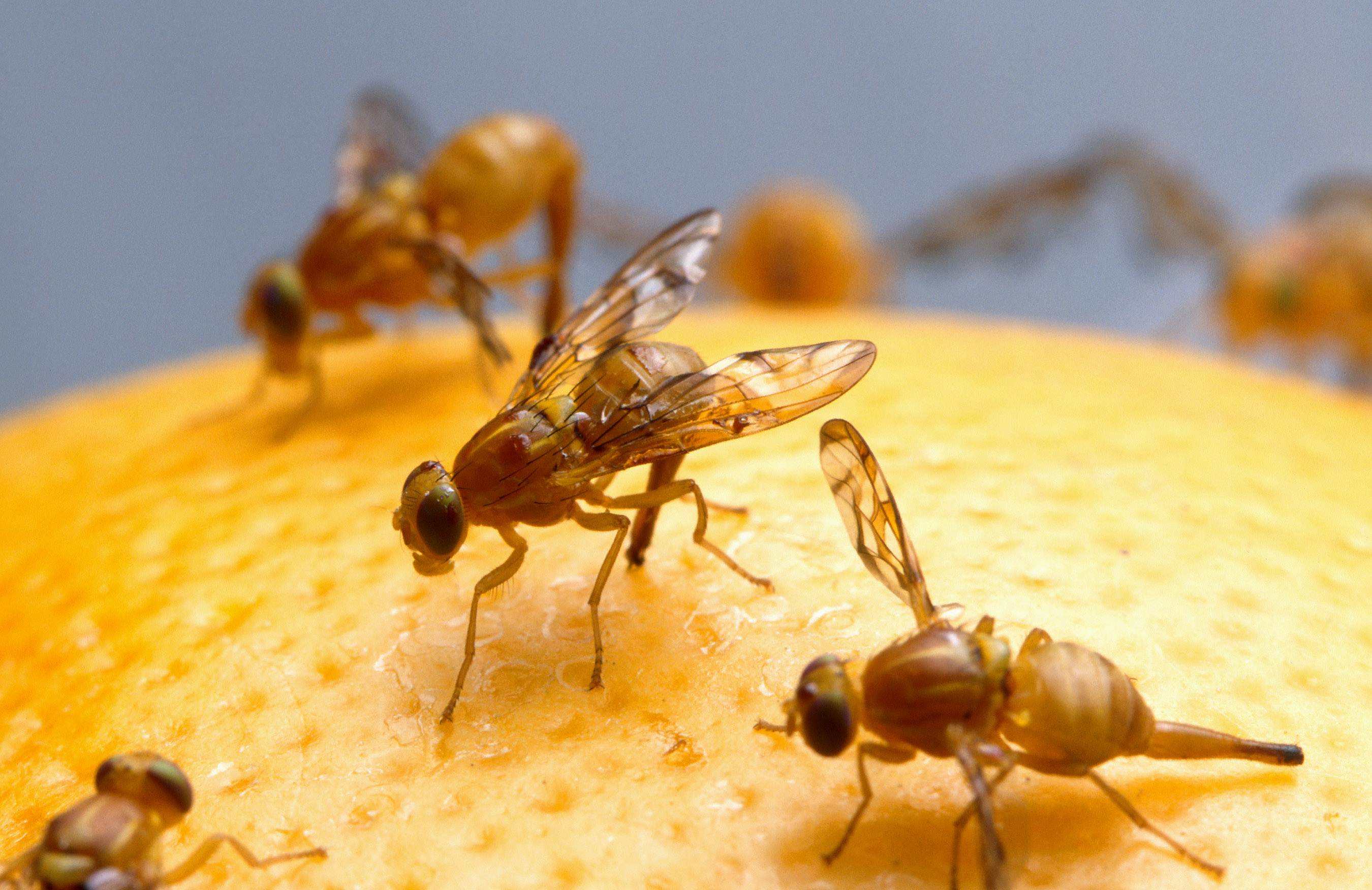
Female Mexican fruit fly

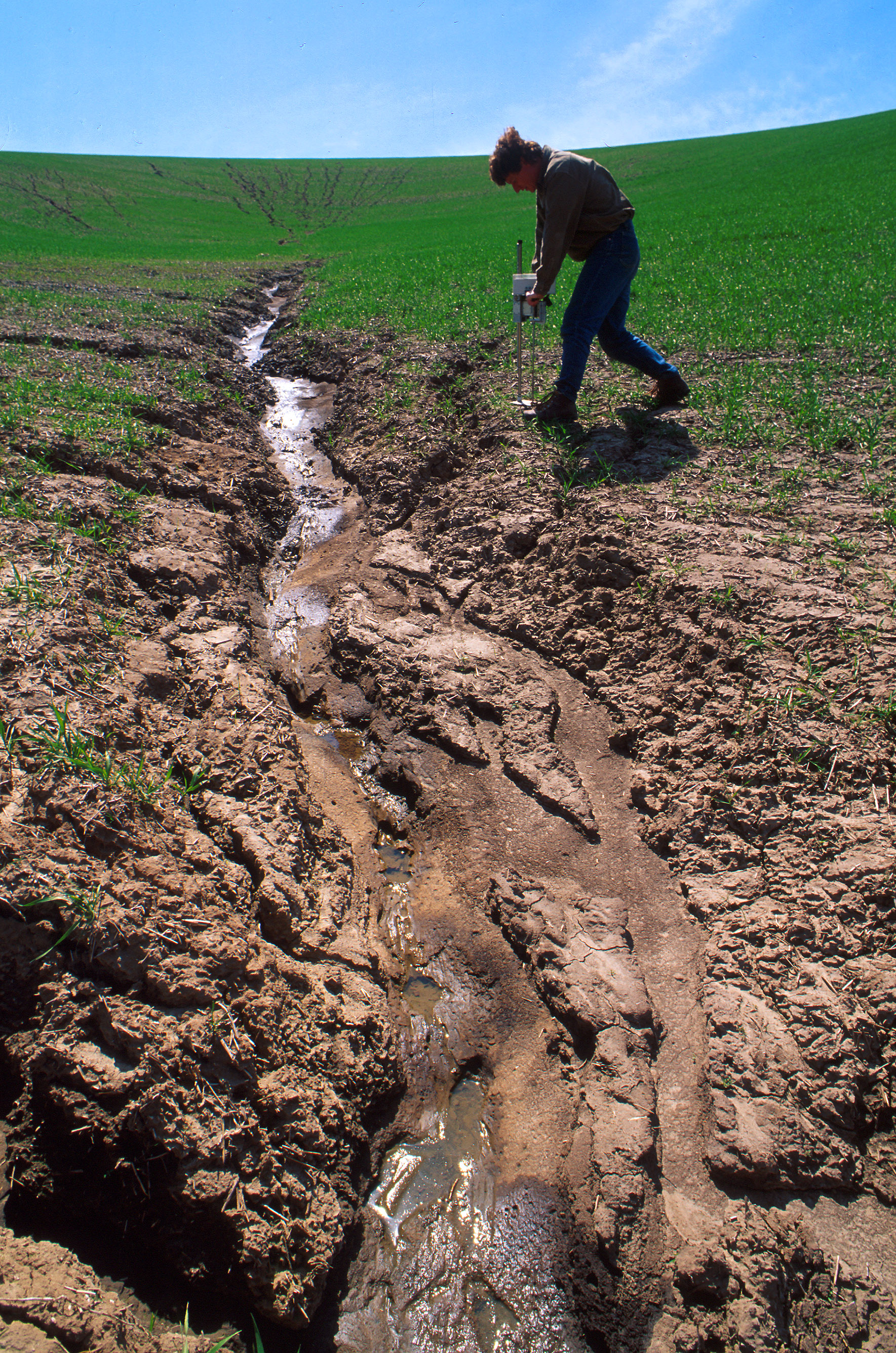
Severe soil erosion in a wheat field near Washington State University

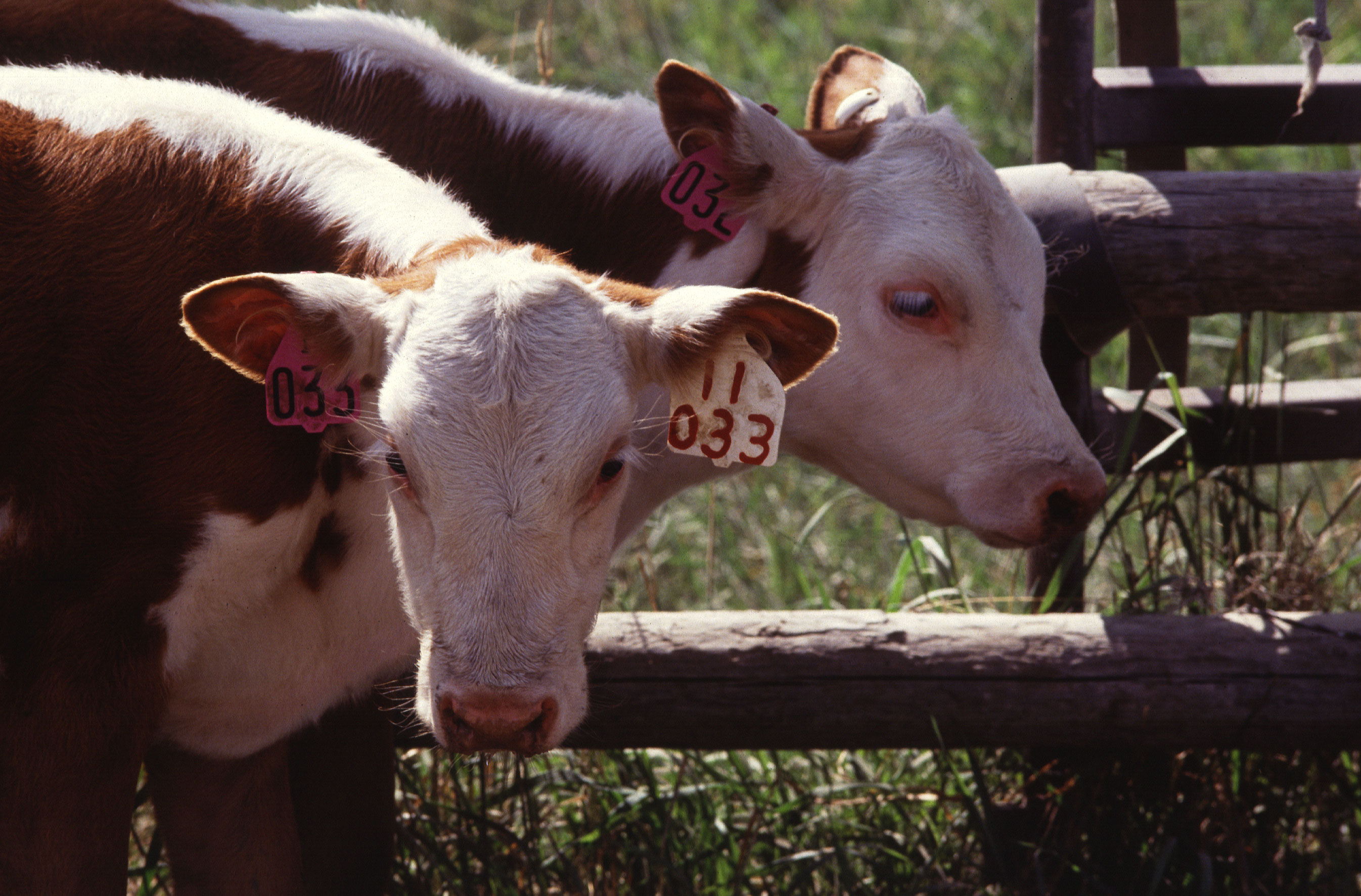
Hereford twins produced at the ARS Range and Livestock Research Unit at Miles City, Montana
