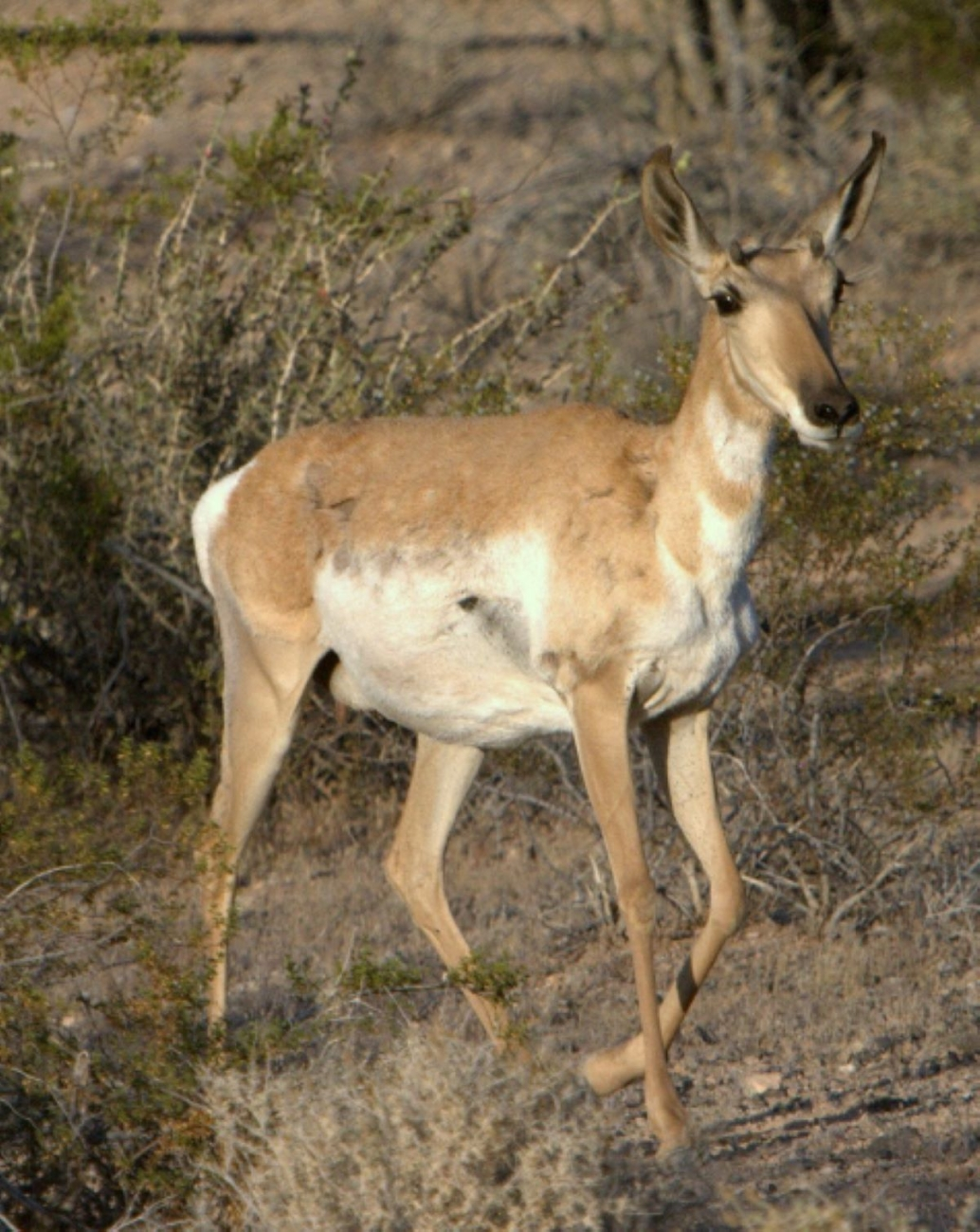

Conservation status
- Endangered (IUCN 2.3)

- Critically Imperiled (NatureServe)

Scientific classification
- Kingdom: Animalia
- Phylum: Chordata
- Class: Mammalia
- Order: Artiodactyla
- Family: Antilocapridae
- Genus: Antilocapra
- Species: A. americana
- Subspecies: A. a. sonoriensis

Trinomial name
- Antilocapra americana sonoriensis Goldman, 1945

= Sonoran pronghorn =

Subspecies of mammal

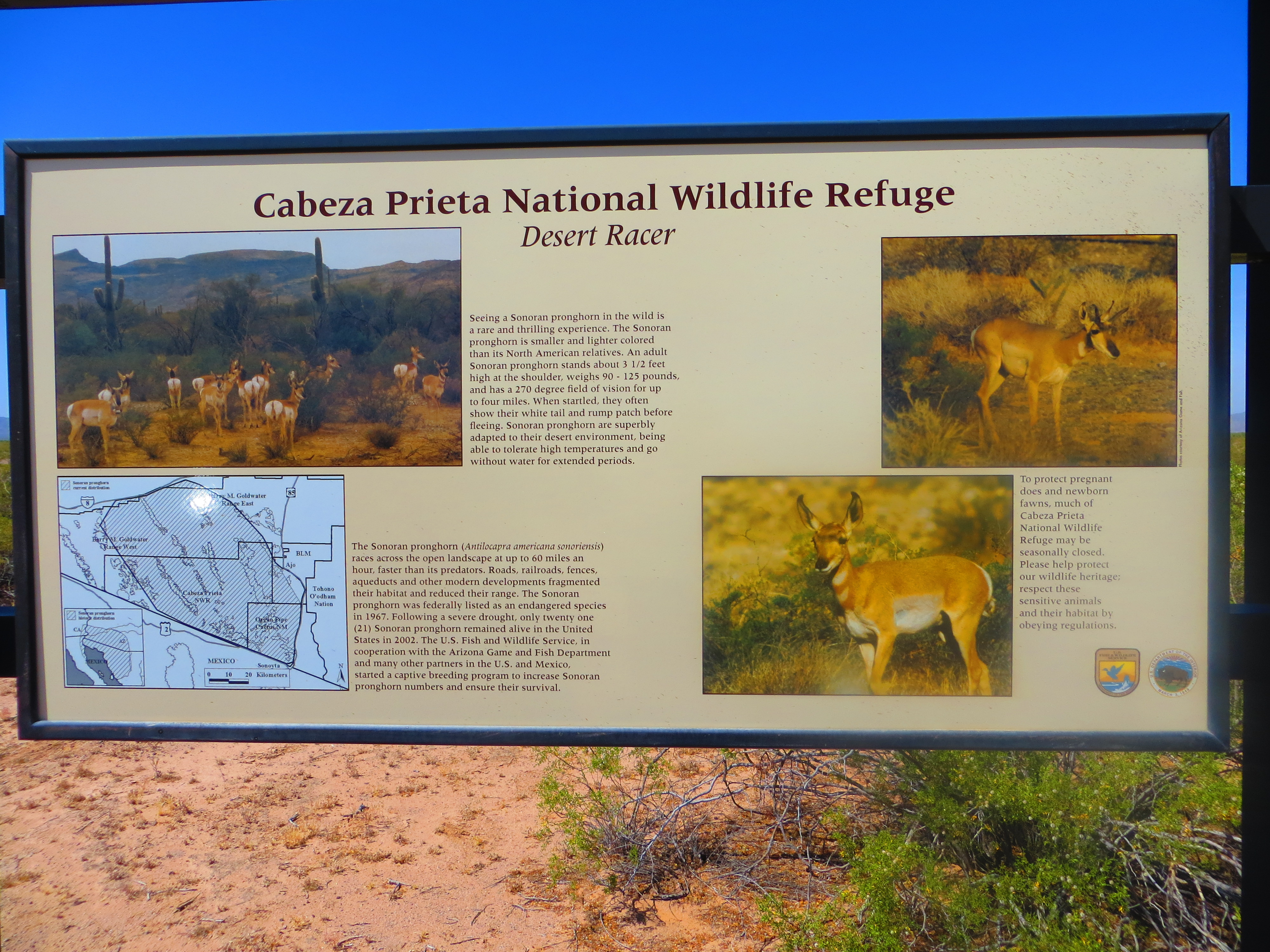
Sign along the El Camino Del Diablo at the eastern entrance to Cabeza Prieta National Wildlife Refuge, providing information about the animal

The Sonoran pronghorn (Antilocapra americana sonoriensis) is an endangered subspecies of pronghorn that is endemic to the Sonoran Desert.

== Conservation ==
Around 450 animals currently are believed to exist in Arizona in the United States, up from an estimated 21 individuals in 2002. The number of individuals in Mexico is estimated to be even lower. It is considered extirpated from California.

In 2012, announcements of two reintroductions were published in the Federal Register. One of the reintroductions was to take place at the Barry M. Goldwater Air Force Range (BMGR) in Yuma, Arizona, and the second was to be at Kofa National Wildlife Refuge.

=== Obstacles to recovery ===
Numerous and ongoing threats exist to the survival of the Sonoran pronghorn. Not the least of these threats is the fact that much of their habitat is occupied by the BMGR, which is an active United States Air Force bombing range.

Adjacent to the BMGR is the Cabeza Prieta National Wildlife Refuge (CPNWR), also a critical breeding area for this species. Parts of the CPNWR are off limits to visitors between mid-March and mid-July, during the fawning season, so as to minimize disturbance to herds with fawns, which can result in the loss of fawns. Despite this fact, this area too is subject to constant environmental pressure. The accompaniments of illegal trafficking of people and drugs from Mexico (such as the construction of illegal roads and trails, reckless disposal of trash, destruction of vegetation, and contamination of water sources) have significantly degraded the habitat. The response from law enforcement agencies (such as the U.S. Customs and Border Protection and the Drug Enforcement Administration), including the construction of the new reinforced border wall which began in 2017, has also exacerbated this problem.

=== Mortality ===
Living in open areas, pronghorns in general must rely on their eyesight to avoid predators, and with population numbers so low, the Sonoran pronghorn must avoid mortality at all costs. Sources of mortality come from predators, drought, and lack of feed; these sources usually affect fawns most often, and adult mortality also occurs in drought situations. Controlling this situation is very difficult because drought is at the hand of the weather. Things that can be done are predator control on coyotes and bobcats, but this is yet to be studied with enough detail to be proven effective. It is yet unknown how the extreme 2026 March heat wave will affect the species’ reproductive outcomes for the year.

=== Habitat ===
The Sonoran pronghorn is endemic to the lowland Sonoran Desert of southwestern Arizona, U.S. and northwestern Sonora, Mexico. They live in open spaces and primarily forage grasses and shrubs for food. Desert pronghorn are more adapted to desert conditions than are other populations of the species, and can go longer without water.
