= List of mountain ranges of Yuma County, Arizona =

A list of mountain ranges of Yuma County, Arizona. Yuma, Arizona – Winterhaven, California is on the Colorado River in the southern section of the Lower Colorado River Valley.

Adjacent notable towns at this confluence of California – Arizona, and Baja California – Sonora, are Los Algodones, Baja California, and San Luis Rio Colorado, Sonora.

== Alphabetical list ==
- Agua Caliente Mountains – Yuma County
- Aguila Mountains – Yuma County
- Bryan Mountains – Yuma County
- Butler Mountains – Yuma County
- Cabeza Prieta Mountains – Yuma County
- Castle Dome Mountains – Yuma County
- Copper Mountains – Yuma County
- Gila Mountains (Yuma County) – Yuma County
- Kofa Mountains – N. Yuma County – (S. La Paz County)
- Laguna Mountains (Arizona) – Yuma County (see also: Laguna Mountains(Calif))
- Little Horn Mountains – S. La Paz County – (N. Yuma County)
- Middle Mountains – S. La Paz County – (N. Yuma County)
- Mohawk Mountains – Yuma County
- Muggins Mountains – Yuma County
- New Water Mountains – S. La Paz County – (connected to Kofa Mountains, N. Yuma County)
- Palomas Mountains – Yuma County
- Sierra Arida – Yuma County
- Sierra de la Lechuguilla – Yuma County
- Sierra Pinta – Yuma County
- Tank Mountains – Yuma County
- Tinajas Altas Mountains – Yuma County
- Tule Mountains – Yuma County

== See also ==
- Valley and range sequence-Southern Yuma County
- List of mountain ranges of the Sonoran Desert
