= El Camino del Diablo =

- U.S. National Register of Historic Places
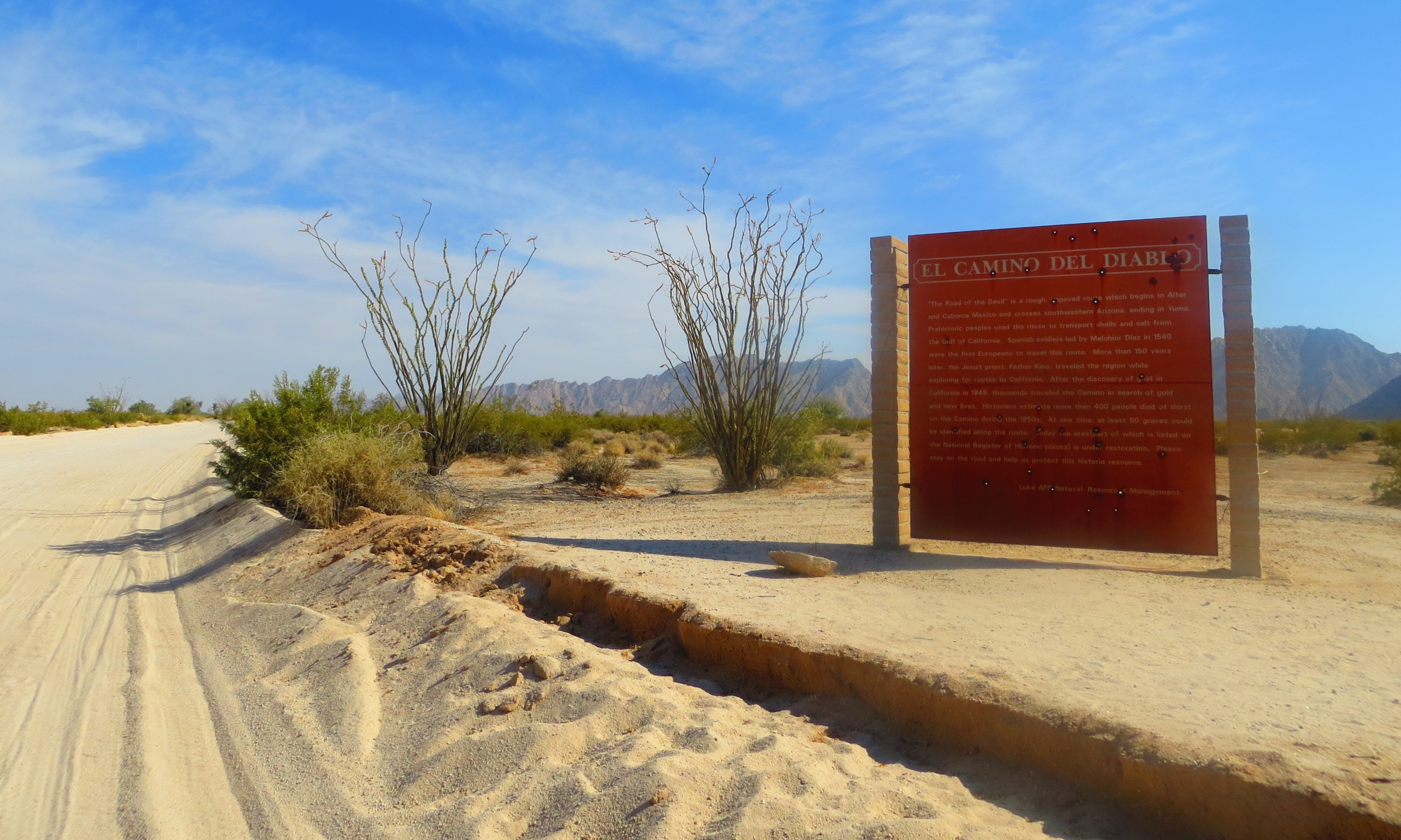
- El Camino del Diablo in the Barry M. Goldwater Air Force Range, near Wellton, Arizona

- Location within Arizona Location within the United States
- Nearest city: Lukeville, Arizona
- Coordinates: 32°4′20″N 113°23′12″W
- Built: 1699
- NRHP reference No.: 78000560
- Added to NRHP: December 1, 1978

El Camino del Diablo (Spanish, meaning "The Devil's Path"), also known as El Camino del Muerto, Sonora Trail, Sonoyta-Yuma Trail, Yuma-Caborca Trail, and Old Yuma Trail, is a historic 250-mile (400 km) road that passes through some of the most remote and inhospitable terrain of the Sonoran Desert in Pima County and Yuma County, Arizona. The name refers to the harsh, unforgiving conditions on the trail.

In use for thousands of years, El Camino del Diablo began as a series of footpaths used by desert-dwelling Native Americans. From the 16th to the 19th centuries, the road was used extensively by conquistadores, explorers, missionaries, settlers, miners, and cartographers. Use of the trail declined sharply after the Southern Pacific Railroad reached Yuma in 1877.

In recognition of its historic significance, El Camino del Diablo was listed on the National Register of Historic Places in 1978. It has also been designated a Back Country Byway by the Bureau of Land Management.

== Original route ==
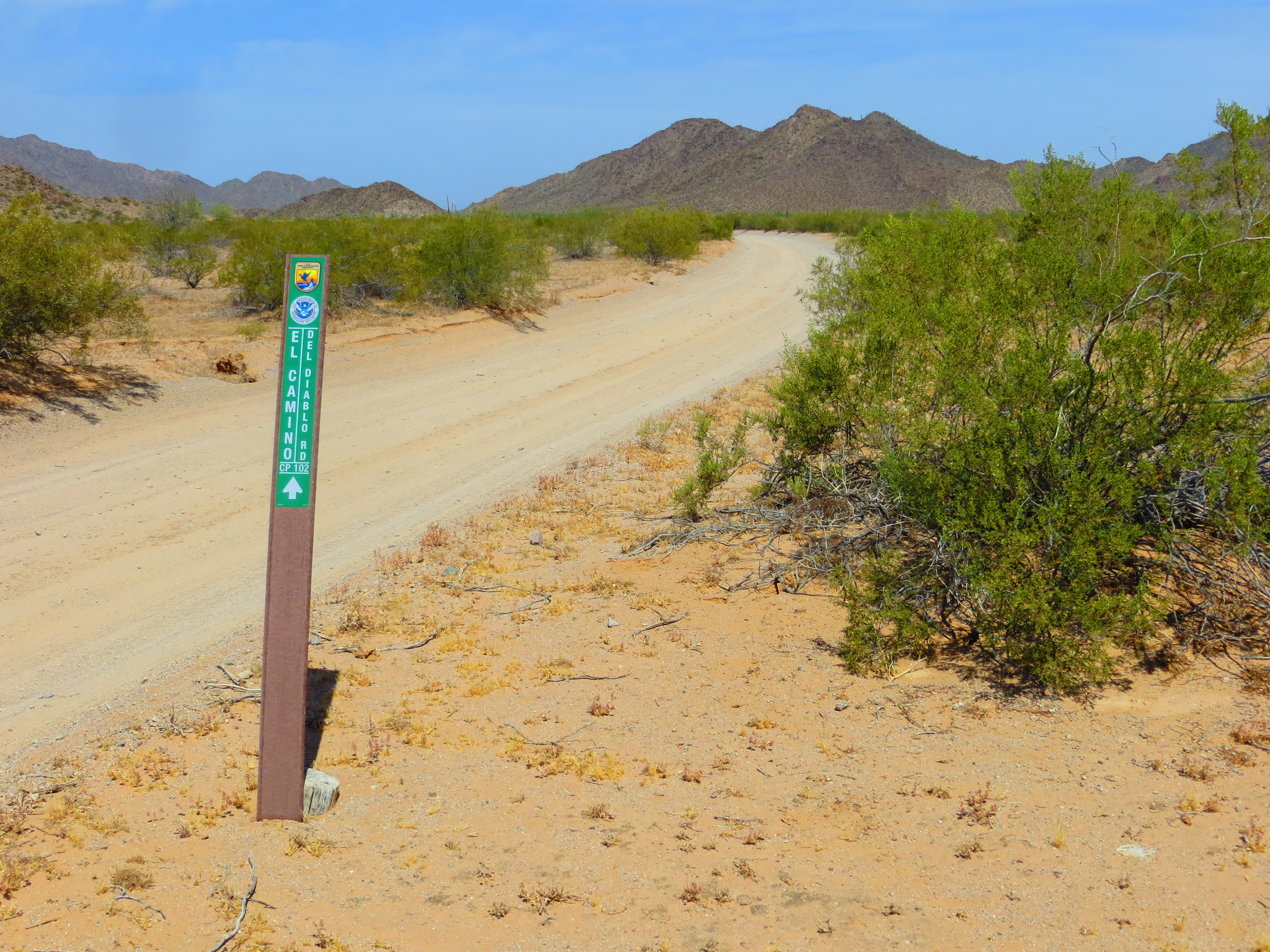
El Camino del Diablo in Cabeza Prieta National Wildlife Refuge

The southern terminus of the original route was located in Caborca, in what is today the Mexican state of Sonora. From Caborca, the route passed through Sonoyta, then Quitobaquito Springs, then through the lava fields of the Sierra Pinacate, then through the Tule Desert and the Tule Mountains. After passing just south of Tordillo Mountain, the route ran past the rain-fed tinajas of the Tinajas Altas before crossing the Tinajas Altas Mountains through the nearby Tinajas Altas Pass. From there, the route continued to the northwest, following the western border of the Gila Mountains before finally reaching the Colorado River at Yuma Crossing. From Yuma Crossing, travelers could cross the Colorado Desert to reach the Spanish colonies of California.

== History of the trail ==
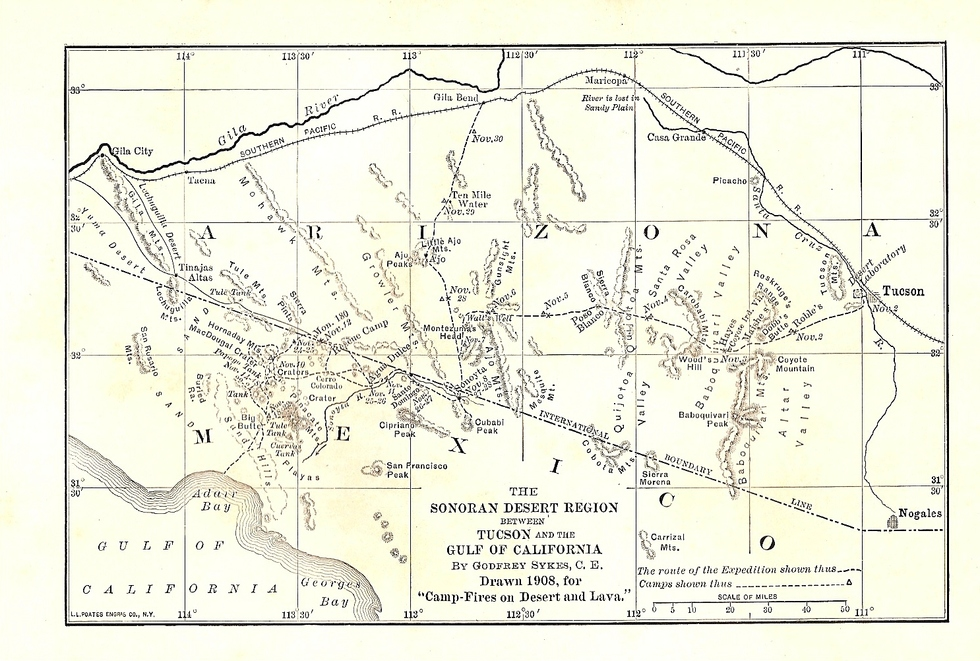
1908 map of the Arizona/Mexico border, 1908, through which the Camino del Diablo passes

El Camino del Diablo is believed to follow Native American footpaths dating to thousands of years ago. In 1540, accompanied by native guides, Captain Melchor Díaz led a detachment of the Coronado Expedition through this vicinity en route to the Californias. The next Europeans known to have transited the route were in the party of Jesuit priest Eusebio Francisco Kino, Commander Juan Matheo Mange, and Father Adamo Gilig, who – along with attendants and Native American guides who knew the location of vital water sources needed along the route – first made the crossing in February 1699. The trail offered a shorter route than sailing around Baja California, while avoiding most of the more hostile Native American tribes.

The route was used by the expeditions to Alta California of Juan Bautista de Anza of the 1770s. However, the 1781 uprising of the Quechan tribe at Yuma Crossing on the Colorado River prevented travelers from reaching the Californias via the trail. Although Lieutenant Colonel Pedro Fages managed to rescue captured Spanish survivors of the uprising in December of that year, El Camino del Diablo largely fell into disuse until 1848–1849, when the California Gold Rush brought many new migrants from Mexico, especially from Sonora to the goldfields of California. Afterward, the trail was used by both United States and Mexican Boundary Survey teams, mapping and cataloging the land purchased in the 1853 Gadsden Purchase. A second wave of Sonoran miners used the trail in the 1860s, when placer gold was discovered along the Colorado River.

Many of these migrants, not used to travel in the desert, would die from thirst and heat exhaustion en route. As a later traveler noted, "frequent graves and bleaching skulls of animals are painful reminders of unfortunate travelers who died from thirst on the road." The most difficult stretch of the trail was the 130-mile (210 km) stretch from Sonoyta, Mexico, to what is now Yuma, Arizona. An estimated 400 – 2000 travelers have lost their lives on the trail, primarily from dehydration, heat stroke, and sunburn, but also from hyperthermia. In summer, temperatures here reach 120 °F (50 °C), and people require 2 US gallons (8 litres) of water a day to survive. Most of the graves line the last 30 miles (50 km) of the trail to Yuma; by one count, there are 65 graves near Tinajas Altas.

Use of the trail declined sharply after the Southern Pacific Railroad reached Yuma in 1870. While prospectors and transient visitors continued to visit the area, El Camino del Diablo never regained its status as a major migration route. Occasionally the route was used by cartographers and boundary survey parties, who documented numerous remains of both humans and domesticated animals.

In recognition of its historic significance, El Camino del Diablo was listed on the National Register of Historic Places in 1978. It can still be transited by visitors to the Cabeza Prieta National Wildlife Refuge, established in 1939 to protect desert wildlife. With the exception of one United States Border Patrol station (Camp Grip), the section of the original trail between Las Playas and Tinajas Altas remains virtually unchanged.

== Tinajas Altas ==
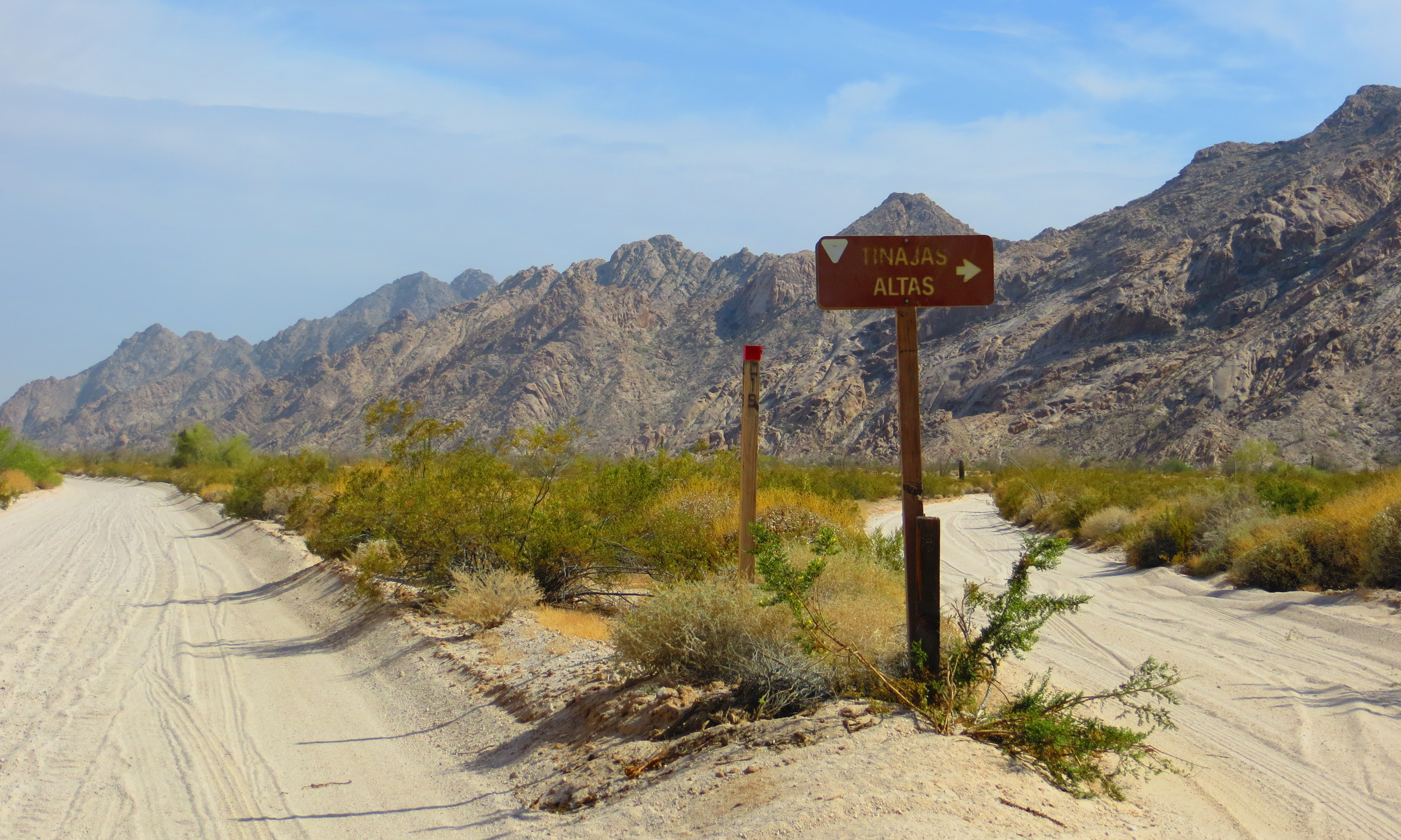
El Camino del Diablo in the Barry M. Goldwater Air Force Range, near Wellton, Arizona. At spur road to Tinajas Altas.

The historic campground at Tinajas Altas ("high tanks") features nine cup-like pools (tinajas) perched one above the other on a steep granite slope, that are replenished solely by rainwater. When full, these tinajas may hold up to 20,000 U.S. gallons (76,000 L), but due to the lack of rainfall and arid atmosphere, one or more are frequently empty. In the days before motor vehicle transport, some travelers perished after finding one or more pools dry. During the 1891–1896 U.S. Boundary Survey expedition, the surveying party related the story of three dead prospectors found just above the empty first tank. The men's fingers were worn raw from climbing the rock to the second tank, which held water, and it was apparent the men had died just yards from their salvation.

== El Camino del Diablo today ==
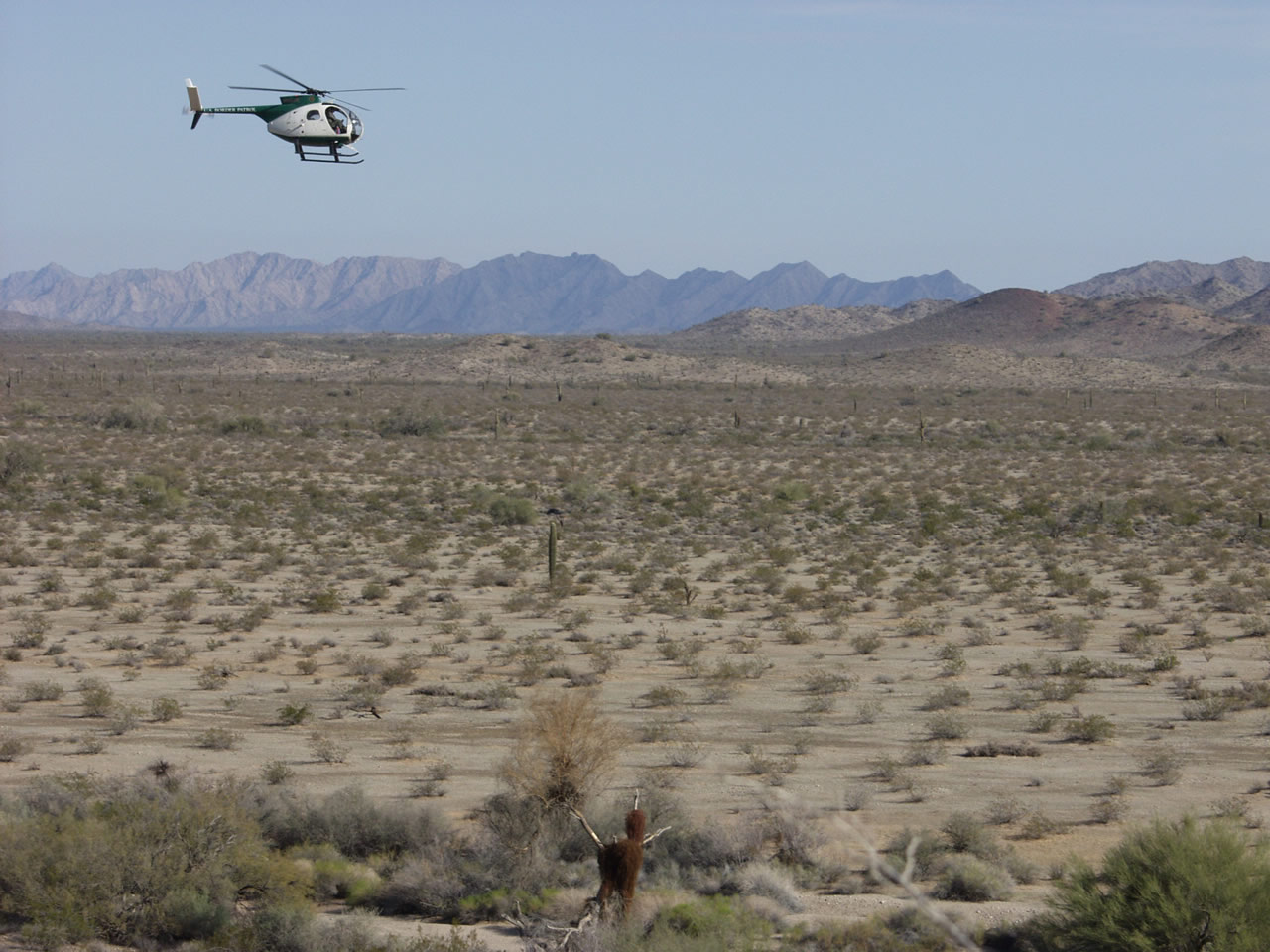
Border Patrol helicopter along El Camino del Diablo, 2004

Today, the Camino del Diablo remains a dirt road, suitable for four-wheel drive and high-clearance vehicles carrying extra water and emergency equipment. No emergency or tow services are available, and visitors use the trail at their own risk.

South of the Mexico–United States border, the original sections of the Camino del Diablo have largely disappeared. In its place, the Mexican government has constructed a paved highway, Mexican Federal Highway 2, which roughly parallels the border for 120 miles (190 km).

The current route begins 21 miles (34 km) southwest of Ajo, Arizona, at the boundary between Organ Pipe Cactus National Monument and Cabeza Prieta National Wildlife Refuge. From there, it continues west past San Cristobal Wash, following the northern edge of the Agua Dulce Mountains to reach Papago Well. From there, the road passes Camp Grip, then runs south of the Sierra Pinta as it passes through the Pinta Sand Dunes and then the Pinacate Volcanic Field. From there, the road passes through the Tule Desert and Tule Mountains, and into Tule Tank Canyon to reach Tule Well, where the road intersects with Christmas Pass Road. The road then passes through the Lechuguilla Desert, just south of Tordillo Mountain, before finally reaching the Tinajas Altas Mountains. At Tinajas Altas, the road forks, and the traveler can take a shorter route which heads north through the Barry M. Goldwater Air Force Range, passing east of Raven Butte and Cipriano Pass and following the eastern border of the Gila Mountains, before finally reaching Interstate 8 and the Gila River at Wellton, Arizona. Alternatively, the traveler may choose a longer route that more closely follows the original route. This route crosses the Tinajas Altas Mountains and continues in a northwest direction, passing west of Raven Butte and Cipriano Pass. It then follows the western border of the Gila Mountains, passing by the abandoned Fortuna Mine, before finally reaching the small community of Fortuna Foothills, Arizona.

The trail follows the Mexico–United States border very closely for most of its length. To transit the entire trail, a permit is required from the Cabeza Prieta National Wildlife Refuge office in Ajo.

== See also ==
- National Register of Historic Places listings in Pima County, Arizona
- National Register of Historic Places listings in Yuma County, Arizona
