= Sierra Pinta =

Landform in southwestern Arizona

- Location within Arizona

Highest point
- Peak: Unnamed
- Elevation: 2,202 ft (671 m)

Geography
- Country: United States
- State: Arizona
- Range coordinates: 32°15′47″N 113°32′35″W

The Sierra Pinta or Sierra Pintas (colloquial Spanish for 'Painted Mountains') are a narrow remote block faulted northwest-southeast trending mountain range, about 22 miles (35 km) long located in southwestern Arizona in the arid northwestern Sonoran Desert, just north of the Pinacate Reserve of northern Sonora, Mexico. The mountains derive their name ("pinta" meaning painted or speckled) from the contrast of different colored rocks, with the northern end of the range mostly light granite, the southern end mostly dark gneiss, and a dramatic dividing line where two meet.

The north end of the range contains the peak called Point of the Pintas at 1,272 feet (388 m), then Bean Pass; adjacent southward is the peak Isla Pinta, at 2,008 feet (612 m), and Sunday Pass. The Sierra Pinta range is toward the southern end of the Mohawk Valley, which also borders the range on the east, and east to the Bryan Mountains. West of the Sierra Pintas is the Tule Desert, and south in northern Sonora is the El Pinacate y Gran Desierto de Altar, the extensive and active volcanic and cinder cone field and preserve. The highest peak in the range is Pinta Benchmark at 2,950 feet (899 m).

An early noting of the existence of the Sierra Pinta Range was in the explorations of Anza.

== Roads and the region ==
West of the northwest end of the Sierra Pintas, the north–south "Christmas Pass Road" goes south from Interstate 8 and through Christmas Pass, adjacent to the Tule Desert, on the southeast end of the Cabeza Prieta Mountains (all to the southwest of the Sierra Pintas). The road terminates close by at the US-Mexico Border at an unimproved road called the El Camino del Diablo, or Devil's Highway, which parallels the border.

== Ecology ==
The Sierra Pintas lie in the central-western portion of the Cabeza Prieta National Wildlife Refuge. The closest access point from the north is Mohawk on Interstate 8 in Arizona, through the Barry M. Goldwater Air Force Range. Ajo, Arizona is 35 air miles eastward beyond two mountain ranges and valleys; Sonoyta, Sonora is slightly southeastward at the south border crossing of the Organ Pipe Cactus National Monument.

== See also ==
- Valley and range sequence-Southern Yuma County
- List of mountain ranges of Yuma County, Arizona
- List of mountain ranges of Arizona
