= Muggins Mountains =

Landform in Yuma County, Arizona

Coordinates: 32.7450461°N 114.2032728°W

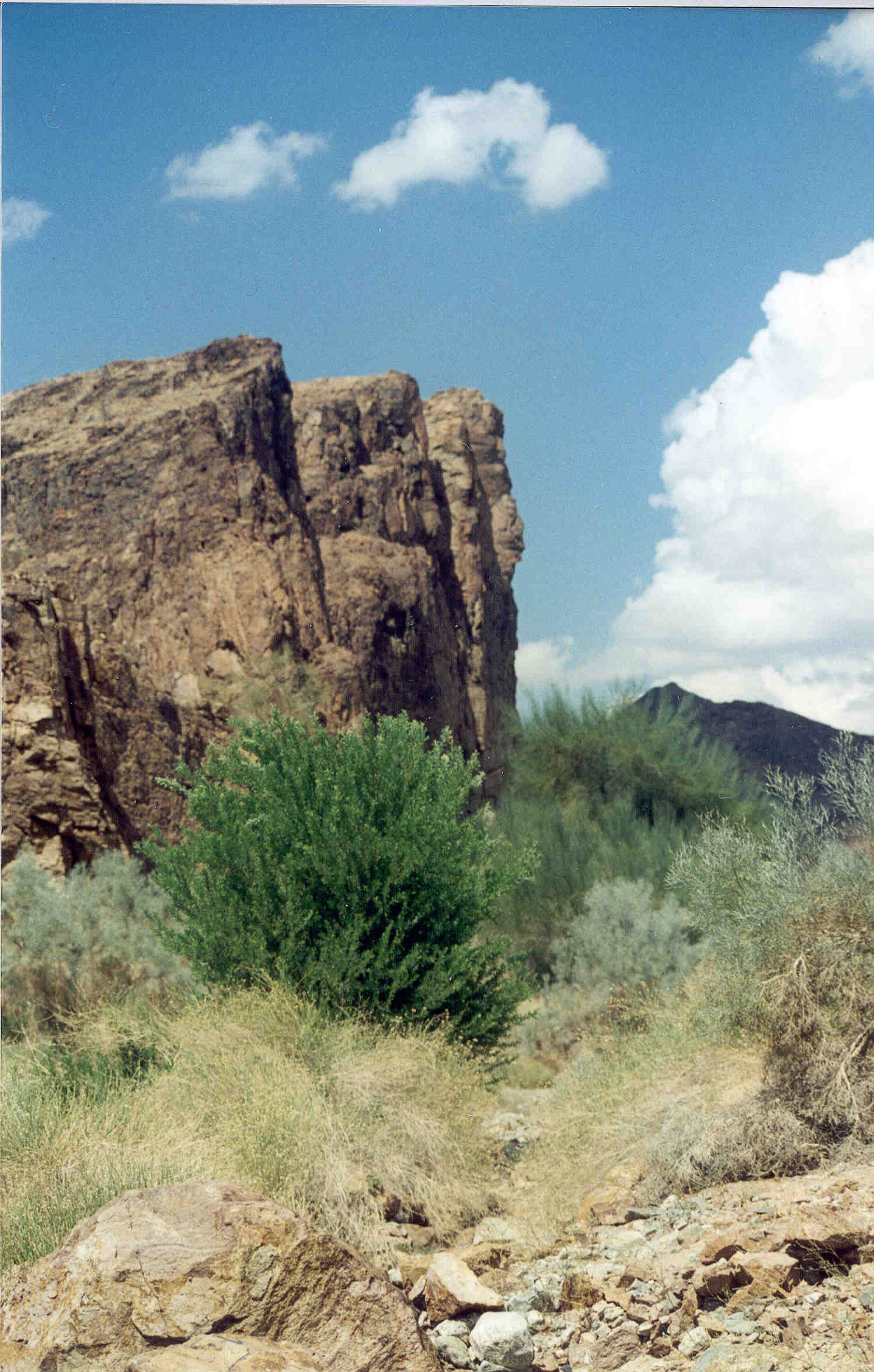
- Morgan Peak in the Muggins Mountains (peak in the distant background); Foreground-base of mountains-adjacent cliffs of wash; in view: gray-green Psorothamnus, deep-green Acacia greggii-(catclaw), blue palo verdes, and straw-colored Bebbia juncea

Highest point
- Peak: unnamed
- Elevation: 1,908 ft (582 m)

Geography
- Country: United States
- State: Arizona

The Muggins Mountains is a mountain range in southwest Arizona east of Yuma, Arizona, northeast of the Gila Mountains, and east of the Laguna Mountains. The Castle Dome Mountains lie to the northeast across the broad Castle Dome Plain. The Muggins Mountains Wilderness occupies the southwest portion of the range.

The Muggins Mountains are a triangular block about 10 mi (16 km) on the SW and SE sides and 14 mi (23 km) on the north side. The northern half of the mountain range has the two high peaks of the range: the unnamed northwest at 1,908 feet (582 m) and the northeast, Red Bluff Mountain at 1,905 feet (581 m). The northern of the range is within the Yuma Proving Ground.

The southern portion of the range is bordered on the southeast by the agricultural Mohawk Valley and the Gila River Valley; to the southwest is Dome Valley and the northwest-flowing Gila River agricultural valley. The Muggins Mountains Wilderness is in the southwest and borders Dome Valley. Two peaks are located in the wilderness, Muggins Peak at 1,424 feet (434 m) in the southeast, and the Klothos Temple in center west at 1,666 feet (508 m).

There is flatland, mesas, and hills between the two northern peaks within the Yuma Proving Ground. Small alluvial fans drain this northern perimeter. The unnamed northwest mountain is separated from the southern mountain block by the west flowing Vinegaroon Wash. The large visible alluvial fan that drains the central Muggins Mountains by way of Vinegaroon Wash sits on the northwest of the range and can be seen from US 95 4 mi west.

Several washes drain the southwest and the Muggins Mountains Wilderness including Long Mountain Wash, Twin Tanks Wash and Muggins Wash all drain southwest into the northeast Dome Valley foothills. Morgan Wash drains the southeast wilderness border to the southeast into Mohawk Valley.

== Vegetation ==
Ephemeral water sources only persist in winter-spring and should be considered nonexistent, except during rains, or winter, and standing water only lasts the longest in wetter and cooler years. The elevation of the mountains is such that there are no standing forests, only desert communities of vegetation. This section of the western Sonoran Desert, and local Yuma Desert is in the creosote bush scrub community. Desert ironwood, palo verde, catclaw acacia, saguaros, ocotillo, Anderson thornbush, smoketree, and creosote are some locally adapted tree/bush species. Brittlebush, saltbush, and bebbia are some common shrub forms.

The nearest communities to the Muggins Mountains are Dome, Ligurta, and Wellton in the Dome and Mohawk Valleys.

== See also ==
- List of mountain ranges of Yuma County, Arizona
- List of LCRV Wilderness Areas (Colorado River)
