= Mohawk, Arizona =

Unincorporated community in the state of Arizona, United States

- Populated place
- Location within the state of Arizona Mohawk, Arizona (the United States)
- Coordinates: 32°43′36″N 113°45′19″W
- Country: United States
- State: Arizona
- County: Yuma
- Established: 1880
- Elevation: 535 ft (163 m)
- Time zone: UTC-7 (Mountain (MST))
- Area code: 928
- GNIS feature ID: 24519

Mohawk is a populated place in Yuma County, Arizona, United States. It is part of the Yuma Metropolitan Statistical Area.

== Geography ==
Mohawk is located on the south border of the Gila River valley on Interstate 8; it is 13 miles east of Tacna, also on Interstate 8. East of Mohawk is Dateland and Aztec. Just northeast located in the Gila River valley is Hyder which lies in the Hyder Valley at the southern end of the Palomas Plain, draining southeastwards from the eastern perimeter of the Kofa National Wildlife Refuge, and the eastern regions of the US Army Yuma Proving Ground.

Mohawk is located at the northern end of the Mohawk Mountains–Bryan Mountains block faulted ranges, which are part of an eleven mountain range–valley region in southern Yuma County. The Mohawk Valley drains northwestwards towards Mohawk on the west of the ranges; the San Cristobal Valley drains mostly north on the east side of the ranges. The drainages do not make it to the Gila River because the region is an extensive region of valleys–bajada plains. The area is part of the central, and hot and arid southwestern region of the Sonoran Desert. It is also just north of the Gran Desierto de Altar and Pinacate Reserve of northern Sonora, Mexico.

=== Climate ===
This area has a large amount of sunshine year round due to its stable descending air and high pressure. According to the Köppen Climate Classification system, Mohawk has a desert climate, abbreviated "Bwh" on climate maps.

== See also ==
- Valley and range sequence-Southern Yuma County
