= Muggins (disambiguation) =

Muggins is a type of domino game.

Muggins may also refer to:

- Maggie Muggins, 1950s and 1960s Canadian children's radio and television series
- Muggins Mountains, a mountain range in southwest Arizona
  - Muggins Mountain Wilderness, the wilderness area in the mountain range

== See also ==
- Mugging
