= Muggins Mountain Wilderness =

Protected area in Yuma County, Arizona

- IUCN category Ib (wilderness area)
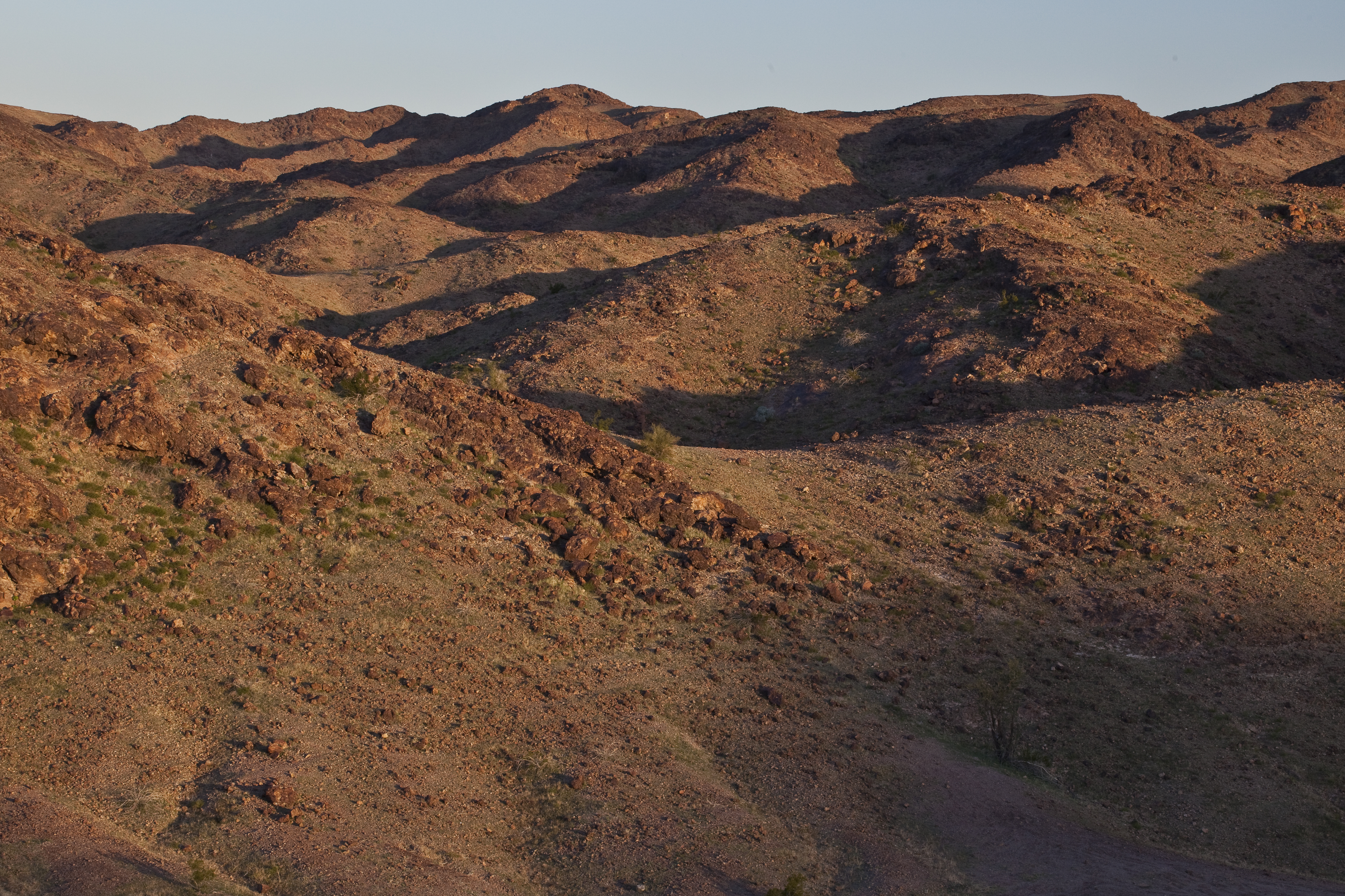

- Location within the United States
- Location: Yuma County, Arizona
- Nearest city: Yuma
- Coordinates: 32°44′41″N 114°15′05″W
- Area: 7,711 acres (3,121 ha)
- Established: 1990
- Governing body: Bureau of Land Management

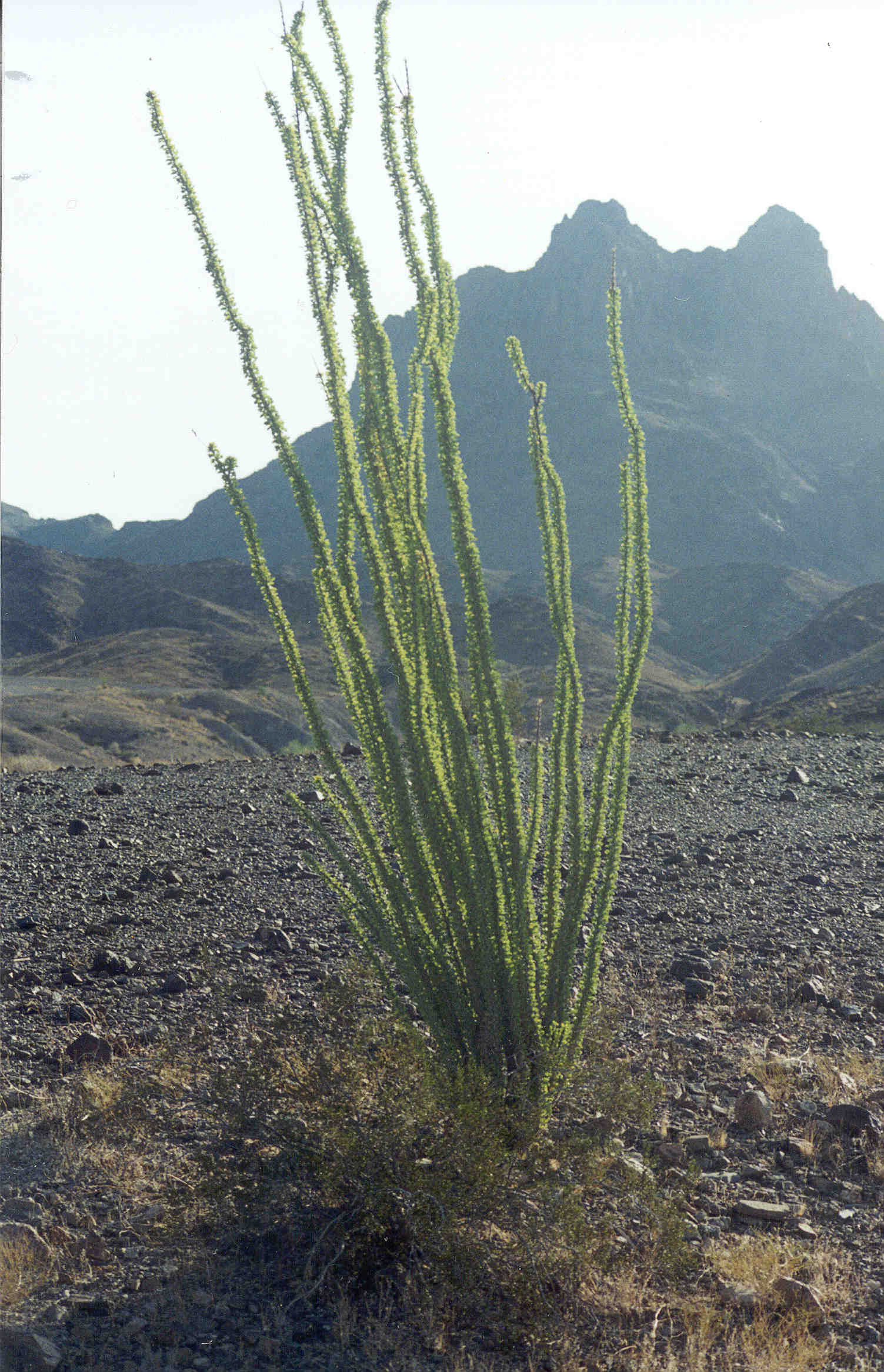
Ocotillo with Muggins Peak in the background

The Muggins Mountain Wilderness is a 7,711-acre (31.21 km^{2}) wilderness area in the U.S. state of Arizona. It is located approximately 38 miles (61 km) east of Yuma, Arizona in the Muggins Mountains and adjacent to the agricultural Dome Valley and Gila River. The wilderness area is made up of the highest peak in the southern section of Muggins Mountains, Klothos Temple at 1,666 feet (508 m). Muggins Peak is adjacent to the peak southeastwards, at 1,424 feet (434 m). Three deeply cut washes drain the southwest border of the wilderness, Twin Tanks Wash, Muggins Wash, and Morgan Wash. Muggins Wash is the access point to the wilderness, by way of County 7th Street.

The ruggedness of the Muggins Mountain Wilderness is ideal for activities such as day hiking, backpacking, rock climbing, sightseeing, photography, and studying nature, native plants, or wildlife.

The nearest communities are Dome, Ligurta, or Wellton in the Dome or Mohawk Valleys; the Fortuna Foothills suburb of Yuma is located west over the Gila Mountains (Yuma County).

== See also ==
- Muggins Mountains – (includes a 3-mountain range area description)
- List of LCRV Wilderness Areas (Colorado River)
- List of Arizona Wilderness Areas
