= San Cristobal Valley =

Landform in Yuma County, Arizona

Coordinates: 32.7889354°N 113.7438133°W

The San Cristobal Valley is a valley in the lower regions of the western Gila River Valley in southwestern Arizona in the western Sonoran Desert. The San Cristobal Wash drains northwest, but exists only in the southern half of the valley.

The San Cristobal Valley drains north and northwesterly and parallels the Mohawk Valley and Mohawk Mountains to the west; the valley is less desert-like than the Mohawk Valley, and ends in an extensive southwest–northeast bajada-plains region, conducive to agriculture. The Gila River valley and Interstate 8 in Arizona are at the north end of the valley between the communities of Mohawk and Dateland. The valley is bordered by two mountain ranges to the east: the Aguila Mountains in Yuma County, with an eastern end crossing into southwestern Maricopa County, and the Granite Mountains of extreme western Pima County.

Southern regions of the valley are in the Barry M. Goldwater Air Force Range-Cabeza Prieta National Wildlife Refuge.

== See also ==
- Valley and range sequence-Southern Yuma County
