= Roll, Arizona =

Unincorporated community in the state of Arizona, United States

- Populated place
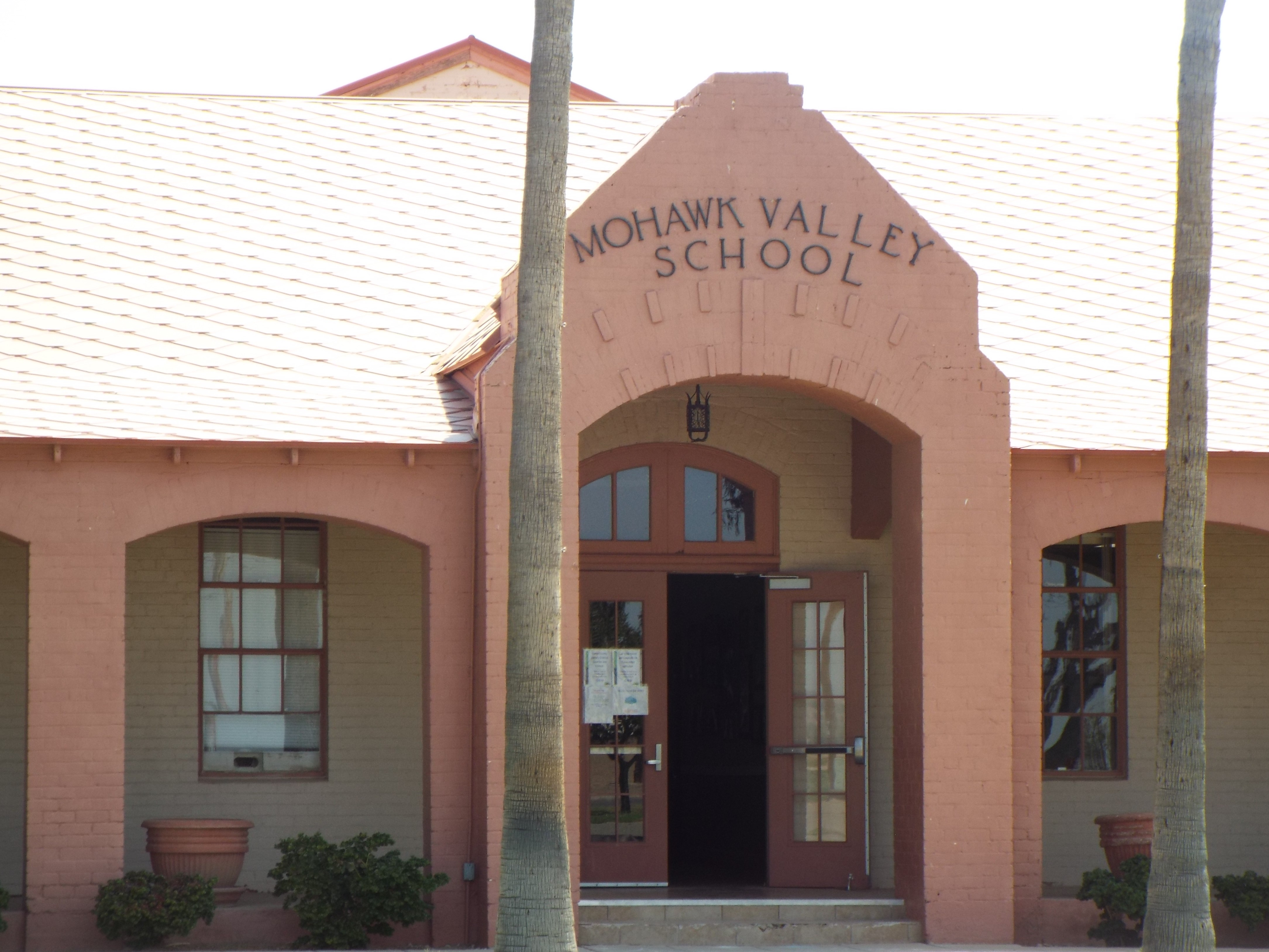
- Historic Mohawk Valley School

- Location within the state of Arizona Roll, Arizona (the United States)
- Coordinates: 32°45′6″N 113°59′21″W
- Country: United States
- State: Arizona
- County: Yuma
- Elevation: 262 ft (80 m)
- Time zone: UTC-7 (Mountain (MST))
- ZIP codes: 85347
- GNIS feature ID: 10481

Roll is a populated place in central Yuma County, Arizona, United States. It is part of the Yuma Metropolitan Statistical Area. Named for early settler John H. Roll, it lies along the lower Gila River in the Mohawk Valley, between the Yuma Proving Ground and the Barry M. Goldwater Air Force Range. It is located along the Union Pacific Railroad's Roll Industrial Lead. Local roads connect Roll to Interstate 8, east of the city of Yuma, the county seat of Yuma County. Its elevation is 262 feet (80 m). Although Roll is unincorporated, it has a post office. Roll has the ZIP Code of 85347; according to the 2020–2024 American Community Survey 5-year estimates, ZIP Code Tabulation Area (ZCTA) 85347 had a population of 575.

== Education ==
Roll is served by the Mohawk Valley Elementary School District. The historic Mohawk Valley School, which is located on 5151 South Ave. 39 East in Roll was listed in the National Register of Historic Places on December 29, 1986, reference: #86003525. The Wellton Mohawk Middle School is its sister school.

Mohawk Valley ESD feeds into Antelope Union High School District.

== Notable people ==
- Yolanda Bejarano, union organizer

== Images ==
Historic Roll

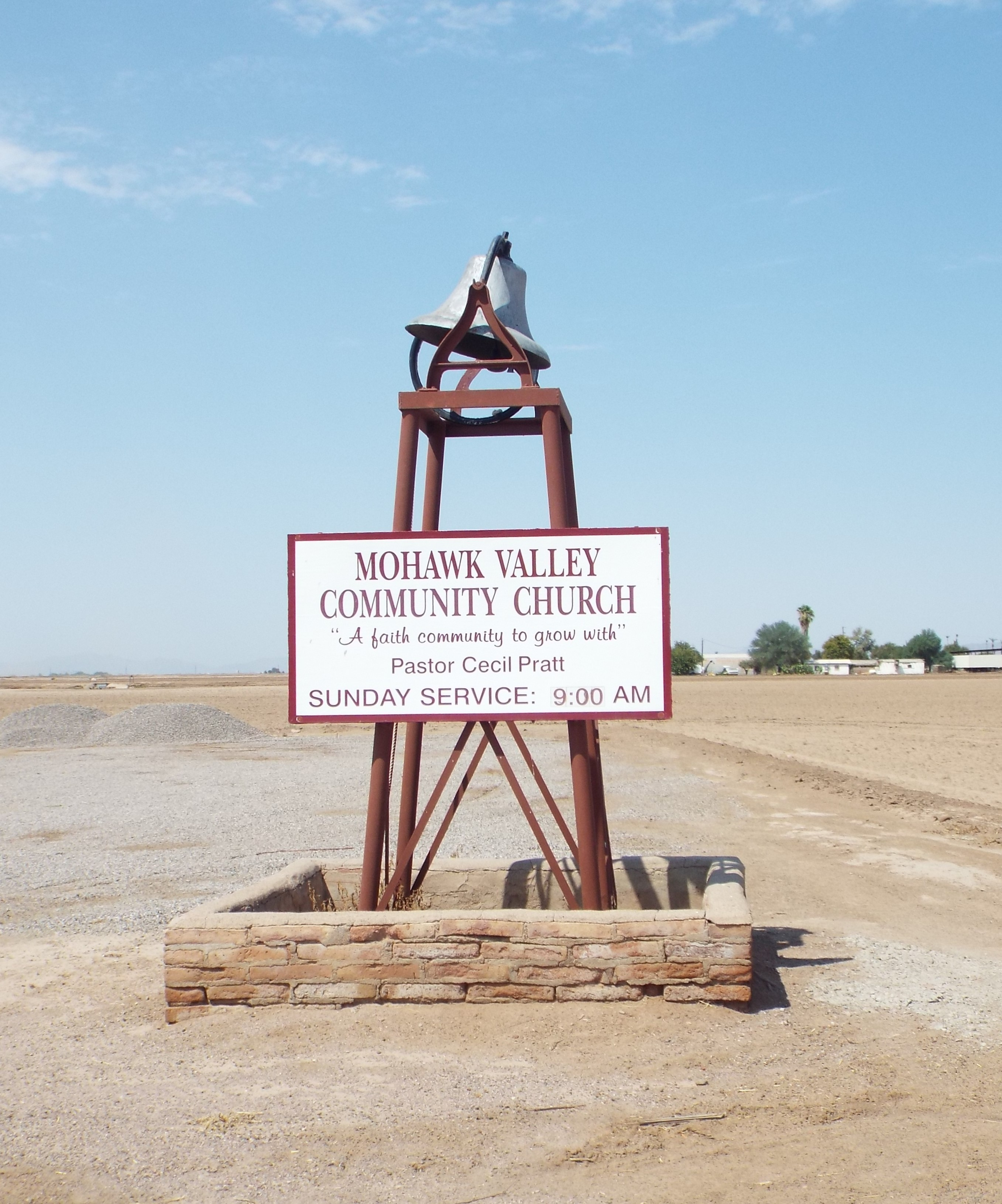
Mohawk Valley Community Church bell

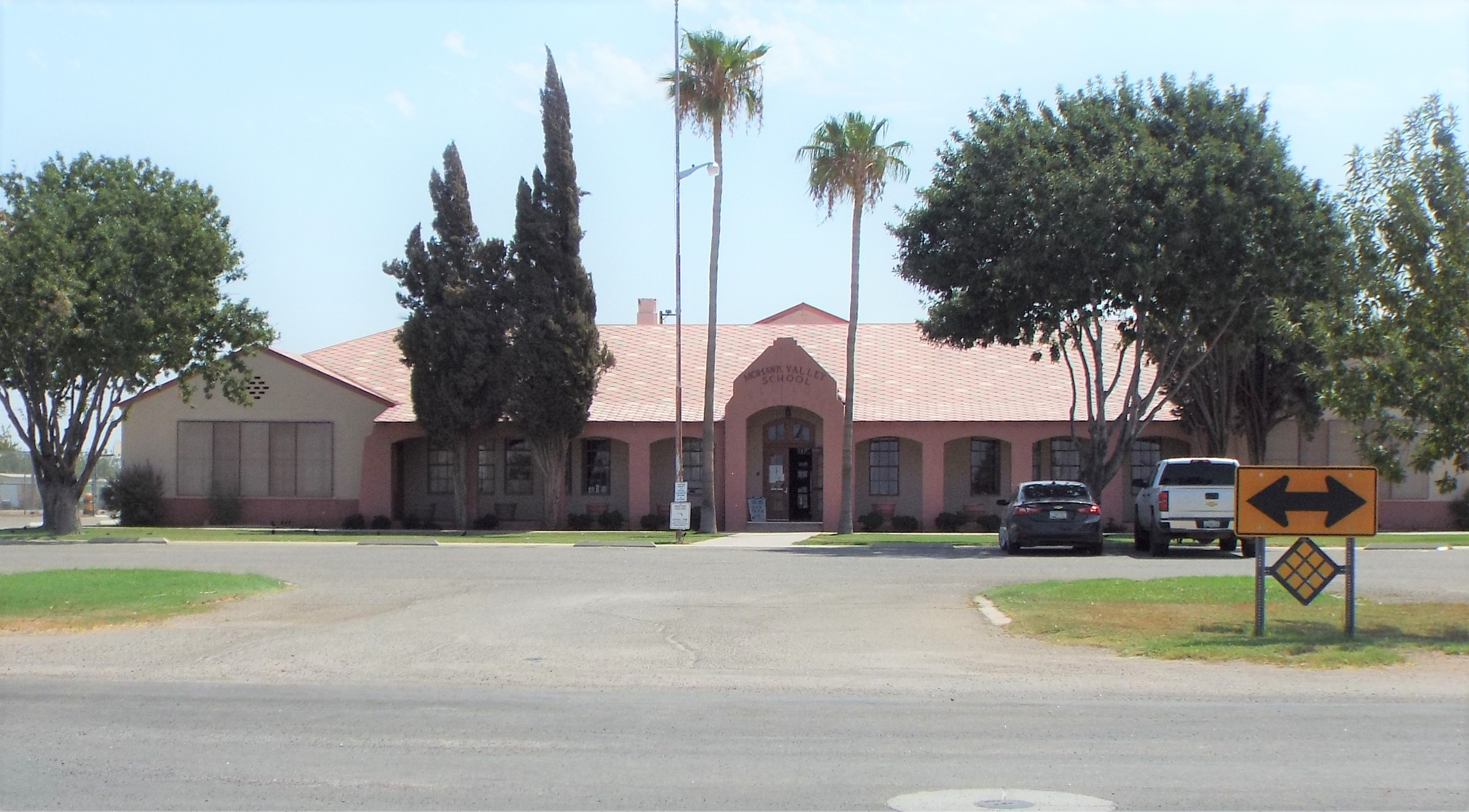
Mohawk Valley School

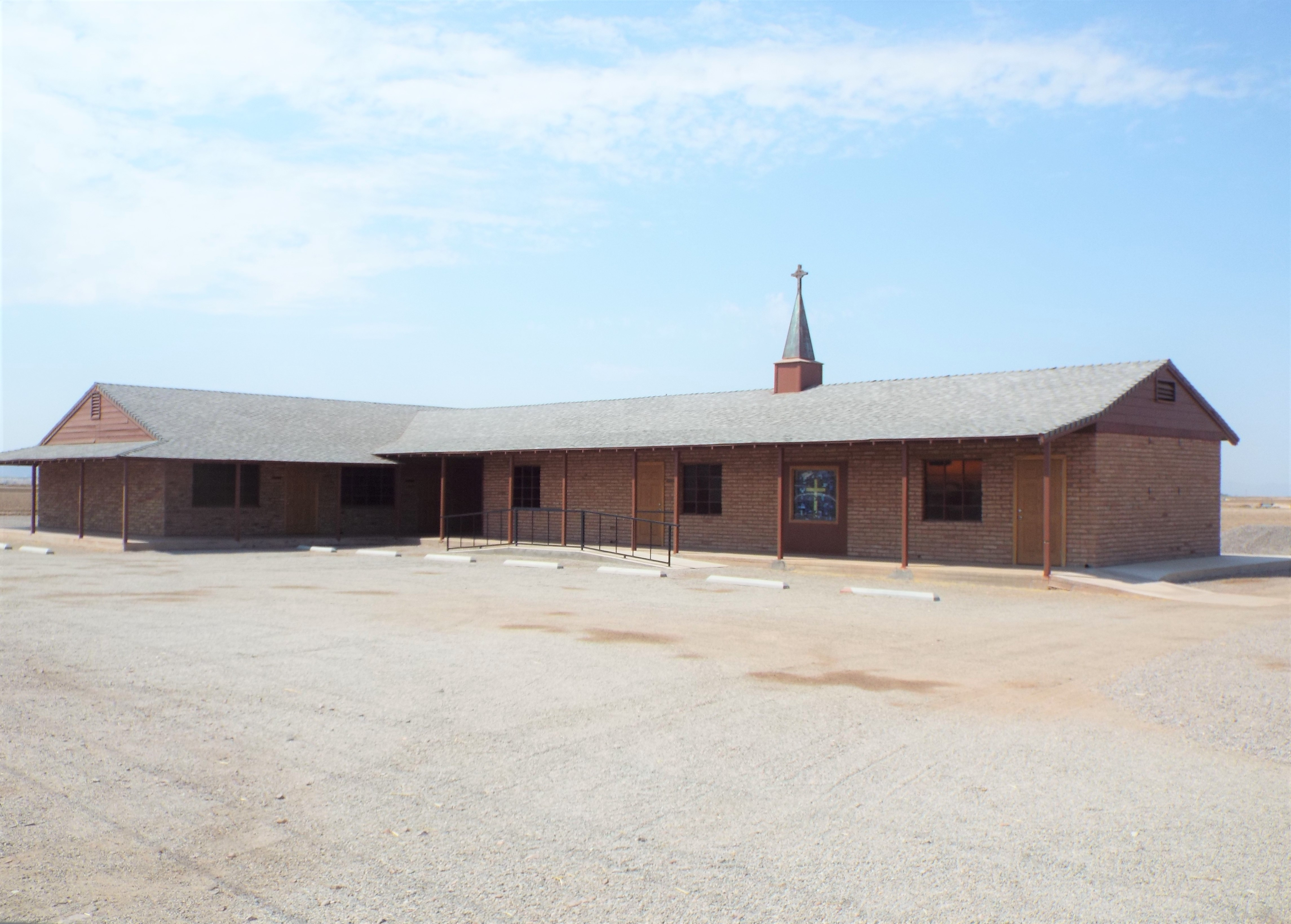
Mohawk Valley Community Church
