= Mohawk Valley Elementary School District =

School district in Arizona, United States

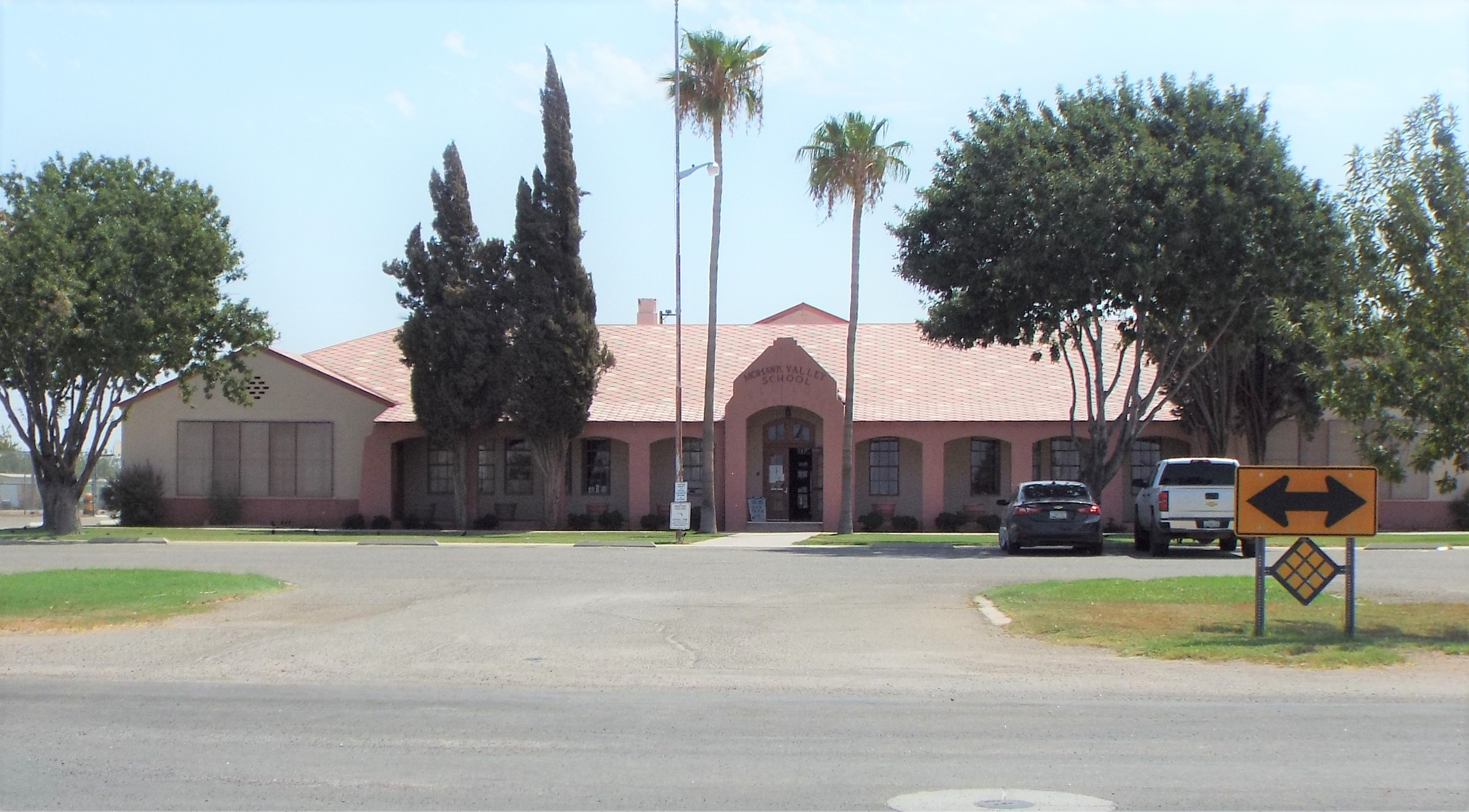

Address
- 5151 South Avenue 39E Roll, Arizona, 85347; United States

District information
- Type: Public
- Grades: PreK–8
- NCES District ID: 0405220

Students and staff
- Students: 131
- Teachers: 9.0
- Staff: 15.75
- Student–teacher ratio: 14.56

Other information
- Website: www.mohawkvalleyschool.org

Mohawk Valley School District 17 is a school district in Yuma County, Arizona. It has one elementary school, the historic Mohawk Valley School, which is located on 5151 South Ave. 39 East in Roll. The school was listed in the National Register of Historic Places on December 29, 1986, reference: #86003525.

The district includes Tacna. It feeds into the Antelope Union High School District.
