= Cabeza Prieta Mountains =

Landform in Yuma County, Arizona

- Location within Arizona

Highest point
- Peak: Cabeza Benchmark
- Elevation: 2,830 ft (860 m)
- Coordinates: 32°20′59″N 113°49′29″W

Geography
- Country: United States
- State: Arizona

The Cabeza Prieta Mountains are a mountain range in the northwestern Sonoran Desert of southwest Arizona. It is located in southern Yuma County, Arizona.

The mountain range is amongst an eleven-mountain sequence of north-trending ranges and valleys in the hottest region of the Sonoran Desert. This southwestern Arizona region is on the northern perimeter of the Gran Desierto de Altar. It includes the northern part of the Pinacate volcanic field.

The Cabeza Prieta Mountains extend northwest–southeast about 24 miles. The highest peak is unnamed at 2,832 feet (863 m); other peaks include: Cabeza Prieta Peak at 2,559 feet (780 m); Buck Peak-(in north) at 2,629 feet (801 m); and Sierra Arida in the south, at 1,736 feet (529 m). A separate mountain outlier lies southwesterly, Tordillo Mountain at 2,170 feet (661 m), adjacent to a primitive road paralleling the US-Mexico Border, called El Camino del Diablo. The range is about 36 miles southeast of the Mohawk Valley (Arizona), and Interstate 8 and is in the west-central Barry M. Goldwater Air Force Range. The Cabeza Prieta Mountains comprise the entire western region of the Cabeza Prieta National Wildlife Refuge—about twenty percent of its total area.

== See also ==
- Cabeza Prieta Wilderness
- Valley and range sequence-Southern Yuma County
- List of mountain ranges of Yuma County, Arizona
- List of mountain ranges of Arizona
