= Tordillo Mountain =

Landform in Yuma County, Arizona

Coordinates: 32°15′57″N 113°52′17″W

Tordillo Mountain is a lone summit that rises to the elevation of 2,064 feet (629 meters) in Yuma County, Arizona.

== History ==
Tordillo Mountain was a landmark along El Camino del Diablo that passed south of that peak.
