= Tinajas Altas Pass =

Landform in Yuma County, Arizona

Coordinates: 32.315°N 114.072°W

Tinajas Altas Pass is a gap in the Tinajas Altas Mountains in Yuma County, Arizona. Its highest elevation is at 1,106 feet (337 meters).

== History ==
Tinajas Altas Pass was the route that El Camino del Diablo followed through the Tinajas Altas Mountains.
