= Tacna, Arizona =

CDP in Yuma County, Arizona

- CDP
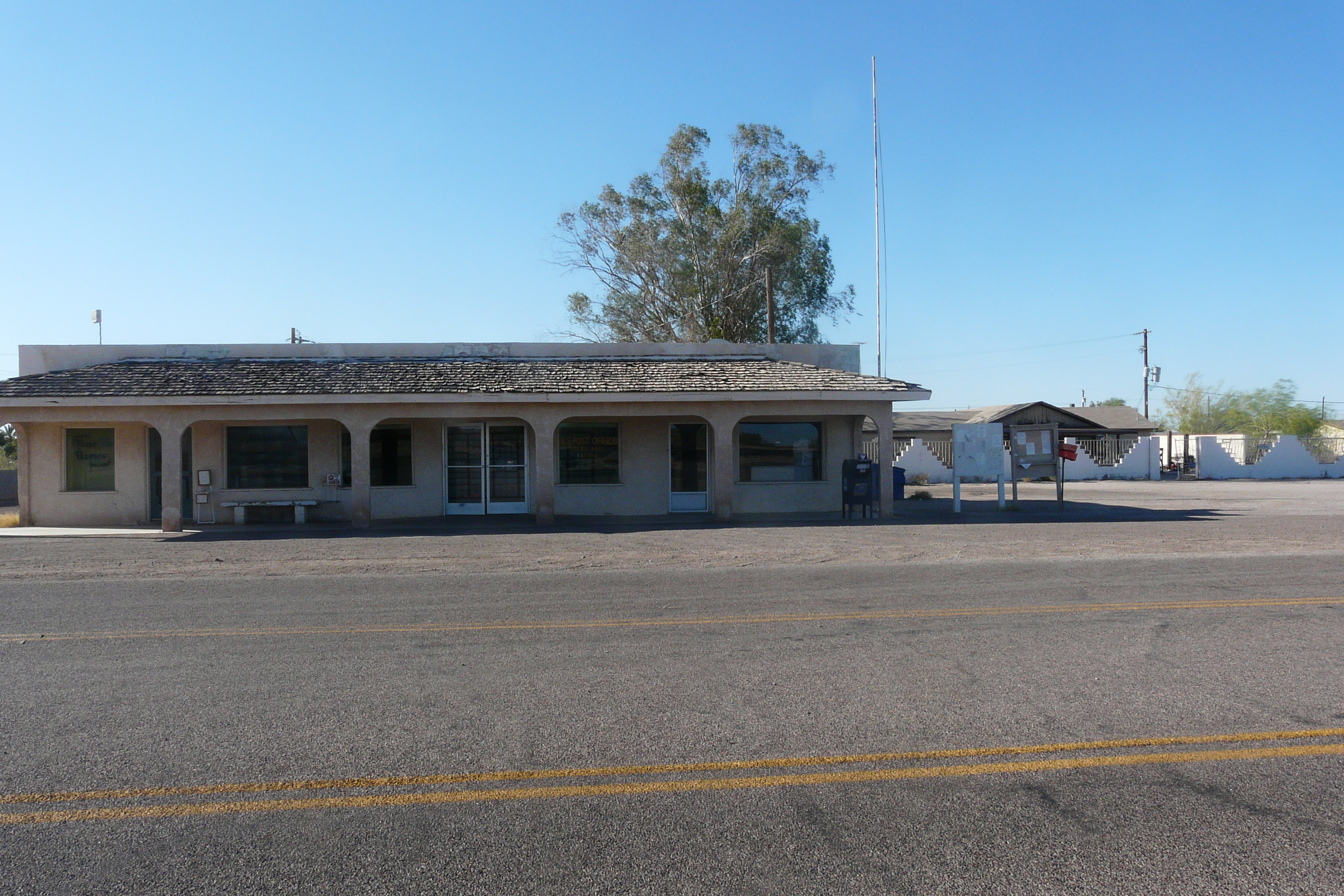
- Tacna, AZ post office, ZIP Code 85352

- Location in Arizona Location in the United States
- Coordinates: 32°42′02″N 113°57′42″W
- Country: United States
- State: Arizona
- County: Yuma

Area
  - Total: 1.92 sq mi (4.98 km^{2})
  - Land: 1.92 sq mi (4.98 km^{2})
  - Water: 0 sq mi (0.00 km^{2})
- Elevation: 335 ft (102 m)

Population (2020)
  - Total: 425
  - Density: 221.1/sq mi (85.36/km^{2})
- Time zone: UTC-7 (MST (no DST))
- ZIP code: 85352
- Area code: 928
- FIPS code: 04-71790
- GNIS feature ID: 2410046

Tacna is a census-designated place (CDP) and colonia in Yuma County, Arizona, United States. The population was 555 at the 2000 census, and 457 as of 2020. It is part of the Yuma Metropolitan Statistical Area.

== History ==
By 1859, the Butterfield Overland Mail stagecoach company had opened the Antelope Peak Station at the foot of Antelope Hill. A post office named Tacna was created following the building of the Southern Pacific Railroad in the 1870s, but did not last long. The name Tacna subsequently only referred to a railroad siding serving as a watering station. The town of Tacna was founded by Max B. Noah in the early 1920s and was named after the railroad stop. At the time he sold the town in 1941, it contained a post office and a restaurant called Noah's Ark. After the town's sale, the post office was relocated four miles east, and the original railroad siding was renamed to Noah.

There is an apocryphal story that the name Tacna is derived from Tachnopolis, a Greek priest from California who is supposed to have settled amongst the native population. This claim appears to be entirely an invention of Noah.

== Geography ==
Tacna is located along Interstate 8 within the Mohawk Valley and just south of the Gila River. It is east of the Yuma Metropolitan Statistical Area.

According to the United States Census Bureau, the CDP has a total area of 1.9 square miles (4.9 km^{2}), all land.

=== Climate ===
Tacna has a hot desert climate (Köppen: BWh) with long, extremely hot summers and short, mild winters.

Climate data for Tacna 3 NE, Arizona, 1991–2020 normals, extremes 1969–present
Month	Jan	Feb	Mar	Apr	May	Jun	Jul	Aug	Sep	Oct	Nov	Dec	Year
Record high °F (°C)	89 (32)	100 (38)	105 (41)	109 (43)	115 (46)	122 (50)	126 (52)	121 (49)	122 (50)	112 (44)	97 (36)	85 (29)	126 (52)
Mean maximum °F (°C)	79.4 (26.3)	84.2 (29.0)	93.3 (34.1)	101.9 (38.8)	107.5 (41.9)	114.1 (45.6)	116.8 (47.1)	116.1 (46.7)	111.9 (44.4)	103.2 (39.6)	90.5 (32.5)	78.1 (25.6)	118.1 (47.8)
Mean daily maximum °F (°C)	70.8 (21.6)	74.6 (23.7)	82.0 (27.8)	88.8 (31.6)	96.8 (36.0)	105.8 (41.0)	109.2 (42.9)	108.7 (42.6)	103.8 (39.9)	92.1 (33.4)	79.1 (26.2)	68.9 (20.5)	90.1 (32.3)
Daily mean °F (°C)	54.1 (12.3)	57.9 (14.4)	64.3 (17.9)	70.6 (21.4)	78.7 (25.9)	87.4 (30.8)	93.8 (34.3)	93.9 (34.4)	87.6 (30.9)	74.6 (23.7)	61.6 (16.4)	52.6 (11.4)	73.1 (22.8)
Mean daily minimum °F (°C)	37.4 (3.0)	41.2 (5.1)	46.7 (8.2)	52.5 (11.4)	60.5 (15.8)	69.0 (20.6)	78.4 (25.8)	79.1 (26.2)	71.5 (21.9)	57.0 (13.9)	44.0 (6.7)	36.4 (2.4)	56.1 (13.4)
Mean minimum °F (°C)	25.8 (−3.4)	30.3 (−0.9)	35.5 (1.9)	41.9 (5.5)	49.9 (9.9)	58.4 (14.7)	67.9 (19.9)	68.7 (20.4)	58.3 (14.6)	43.5 (6.4)	31.5 (−0.3)	25.3 (−3.7)	23.4 (−4.8)
Record low °F (°C)	13 (−11)	20 (−7)	25 (−4)	31 (−1)	37 (3)	42 (6)	52 (11)	51 (11)	43 (6)	27 (−3)	22 (−6)	13 (−11)	13 (−11)
Average precipitation inches (mm)	0.44 (11)	0.56 (14)	0.41 (10)	0.09 (2.3)	0.08 (2.0)	0.02 (0.51)	0.42 (11)	0.43 (11)	0.41 (10)	0.23 (5.8)	0.32 (8.1)	0.38 (9.7)	3.79 (96)
Average precipitation days	1.9	2.1	1.6	0.8	0.4	0.2	2.0	2.4	1.7	0.9	0.8	2.0	16.8
Source: NOAA

== Demographics ==
Historical population
Census	Pop.	Note	%±
2000	555		—
2010	602		8.5%
2020	425		−29.4%
U.S. Decennial Census

At the 2000 census there were 555 people, 194 households, and 149 families in the CDP. The population density was 294.3 inhabitants per square mile (113.6/km^{2}). There were 281 housing units at an average density of 149.0 per square mile (57.5/km^{2}). The racial makeup of the CDP was 67% White, 1% Black or African American, 1% Native American, 1% Asian, 25% from other races, and 6% from two or more races. 51% of the population were Hispanic or Latino of any race. Of the 194 households 37% had children under the age of 18 living with them, 66% were married couples living together, 7% had a female householder with no husband present, and 23% were non-families. 18% of households were one person and 9% were one person aged 65 or older. The average household size was 2.86 and the average family size was 3.25.

The age distribution was 30% under the age of 18, 8% from 18 to 24, 26% from 25 to 44, 19% from 45 to 64, and 17% 65 or older. The median age was 36 years. For every 100 females, there were 105.6 males. For every 100 females age 18 and over, there were 97.4 males.

The median household income was $25,556 and the median family income was $26,354. Males had a median income of $26,875 versus $23,750 for females. The per capita income for the CDP was $11,197. About 22% of families and 25% of the population were below the poverty line, including 34% of those under age 18 and 14% of those age 65 or over.

== Education ==
It is in the Mohawk Valley Elementary School District and the Antelope Union High School District.
