= Mohawk Mountains =

Landform in southwestern Arizona

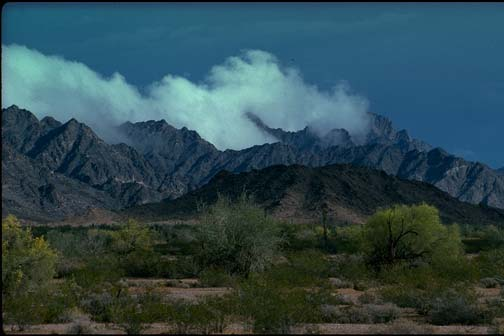
- Low clouds on the Mohawk Mountains

Highest point
- Peak: Mohawk Peak
- Elevation: 2,775 ft (846 m)

Dimensions
- Length: 35 mi (56 km) NW–SE
- Width: 5 mi (8.0 km)

Geography
- Location within Arizona
- Country: United States
- State: Arizona
- Region(s): Central & Northwestern Sonoran Desert
- District: Yuma County
- Range coordinates: 32°35′23″N 113°38′51″W
- Borders on: Gila River (N); San Cristobal Valley (NE); Mohawk Valley (SW); Bryan Mountains (SE)

The Mohawk Mountains (Maricopa: Vii Kachkwiny, O'odham: Kusvo To:b) is a mountain range in the northwest Sonoran Desert of southwest Arizona. It abuts the western Gila River valley to the north (the Lower Gila River Valley), and is located in southern Yuma County. The Mohawk Valley lies adjacent and southwest of the range; the San Cristobal Valley is northeast.

The Mohawk Mountains-Bryan Mountains is a northwest–southeast trending block faulted system. Mohawk, Arizona on Interstate 8 is located on the north end of the range; Mohawk Pass traverses the range with the interstate route.

The highest point in the Mohawk Range is Mohawk Peak at 2,775 feet (846 m).

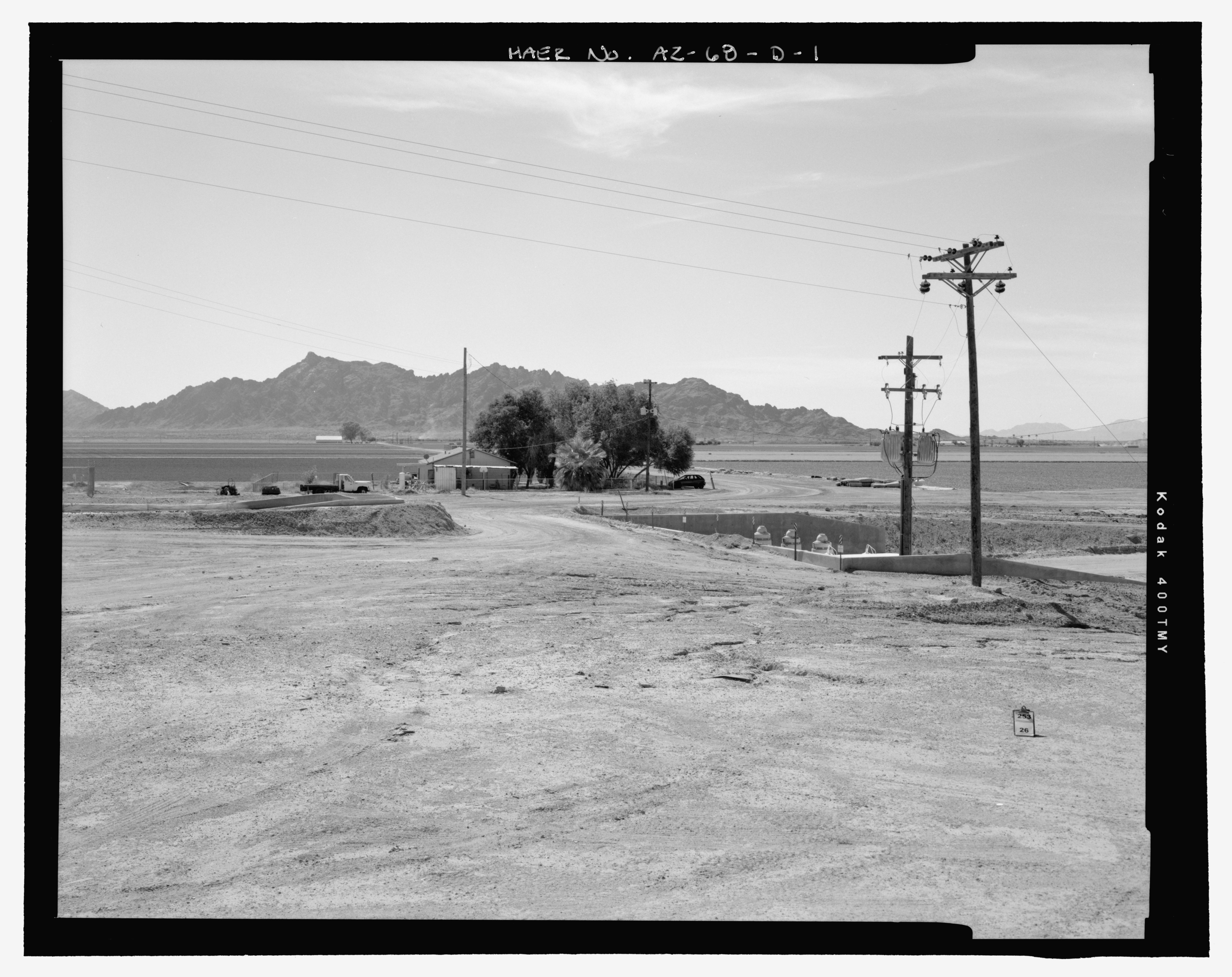
Distant view from west: western side of Mohawk Mountains

== See also ==
- Valley and range sequence-Southern Yuma County
- List of mountain ranges of Yuma County, Arizona
