= Bryan Mountains =

Landform in Yuma County, Arizona

- Location within Arizona

Highest point
- Peak: Unnamed
- Elevation: 1,794 ft (547 m)

Dimensions
- Length: 10 mi (16 km) NW-SE
- Width: 3 mi (4.8 km)

Geography
- Country: United States
- State: Arizona
- Region: (northwest)-Sonoran Desert
- County: Yuma County
- Communities: Mohawk, Arizona and Ajo, Arizona
- Range coordinates: 32°18′27″N 113°22′46″W
- Borders on: Mohawk Mountains-NNW; Granite Mtns-E; Mohawk Valley-SW; Sierra Pinta and Tule Desert-SW

The Bryan Mountains are a small mountain range in the northwestern Sonoran Desert of southwestern Arizona. The range is located in southeastern Yuma County, about 75 mi (121 km) southeast of Yuma and about 35 mi (56 km) west of Ajo. The range is approximately ten miles long and about three miles wide at its widest point. The highpoint of the range is 1,794 feet (547 meters) above sea level and is located at 32°18'27"N, 113°22'46"W (NAD 1983 datum). The range is located entirely within the Cabeza Prieta National Wildlife Refuge.

Geologically, the Bryan Mountains are an extension southeastwards of the block faulted Mohawk Mountains, and what are now the Bryan Mountains were actually considered part of the Mohawk Mountains well into the middle of the 20th century.

== History ==
=== History of the name ===
The range was named in 1933 by Eldred D. Wilson for Kirk Bryan, a geologist and explorer with the U.S. Geological Survey (USGS) who in the early 1920s conducted a reconnaissance of the area and wrote a detailed guide describing the area's geology and difficult-to-find surface water resources. Bryan was one of several geologists and geographers dispatched by the USGS in the early part of the 20th century to explore and record the physical characteristics of the arid southwestern United States. The Water Supply Papers published by Bryan and others are now considered classic accounts of what the Sonoran and Mojave Deserts were like before the post-World War II population boom transformed the region.

Wilson evidently intended for the Bryan Mountains to extend even farther to the north and south than what was eventually recorded on USGS maps of the area. In Wilson's geologic map of Yuma County published in 1933, the Bryan's are depicted as including what are now considered the southern third of the Mohawk Mountains to the north of the present-day Bryan's. The map shows a series of outlying hills to the south and southwest as part of the Bryan's as well. For some unexplained reason, the surveyors of the Army Map Service and the USGS eventually depicted a much less expansive version of the range when the first 15-minute topographic maps of the area were produced in the mid-1960s, and that depiction has carried over to more recent USGS maps produced today.

== See also ==
- Valley and range sequence-Southern Yuma County
- List of mountain ranges of Yuma County, Arizona
- List of mountain ranges of Arizona
- Cabeza Prieta National Wildlife Refuge
