= David Avellan =

American practitioner of Brazilian Jiu-Jitsu practitioner and mixed martial arts

- Born: July 7, 1981 (age 45); Miami, Florida, United States
- Height: 5 ft 9 in (1.75 m)
- Weight: 205 lb (93 kg; 14.6 st)
- Division: Light Heavyweight
- Reach: 72 in (183 cm)
- Style: Submission wrestling, Brazilian jiu-jitsu
- Fighting out of: Miami, Florida
- Team: Freestyle Fighting Academy
- Rank: black belt in Brazilian Jiu-Jitsu
- Years active: 1997–present

Mixed martial arts record
- Total: 3
- Wins: 2
- By knockout: 1
- By submission: 1
- Losses: 1
- By knockout: 1

Other information
- Mixed martial arts record from Sherdog

David Avellan (born July 7, 1981) is an American former submission wrestler, professional mixed martial artist (MMA) and Brazilian jiu-jitsu (BJJ) practitioner and coach. (Note: under Ricardo Teixeira)

A multiple times Grapplers Quest and NAGA champion, Avellan is an ADCC Submission Fighting World Championship medallist and the 2004 ADCC Superfight Champion.

A co/founder of Freestyle Fighting Academy, he has trained a number of UFC fighters including Jorge Masvidal and is credited with introducing the term 'kimura trap' and 'kimura trap system' into BJJ common vocabulary.

== Career ==
David Avellan was born in Miami, Florida on 7 July 1981. After a successful wrestling career in high school, Avellan got into NHB (No Holds Barred) fighting. In 2001, Avellan and his brother Marcos opened the Freestyle Fighting Academy (FFA). In 2002 the Avellan brothers started training Brazilian jiu jitsu under Ricardo Teixeira, from whom they received their black belt three years later.

== Championships and accomplishments ==
=== Brazilian jiu-jitsu / Submission wrestling ===
Main Achievements:

- FGA Submission Grappling Open II Champion (2002)
- Planet Submission Absolute Champion (2002)
- NAGA Champion (2003)
- Grapplers Quest Pro Division Champion (2003)
- Grapplers Quest West V Pro Champion (2004)
- Grapplers Quest Oxydol Challenge Champion (2004)
- Grapplers Quest Florida Champion (2011)
- ADCC Superfight Winner (2004)
- Ultimate Submission Showdown Runner-up (2003)
- ADCC 3rd Place (2009)

== Mixed martial arts record ==
Professional record breakdown
3 matches	2 wins	1 loss
By knockout	1	1
By submission	1	0

Res.	Record	Opponent	Method	Event	Date	Round	Time	Location	Notes
Loss	2–1	Aaron Simpson	KO (punch)	WEC 36: Faber vs. Brown	November 5, 2008	1	0:18	Hollywood, Florida, United States	
Win	2–0	Antony Rea	TKO (punches)	BodogFight - Costa Rica Combat	February 17, 2007	2	4:15	Pococí (canton), Costa Rica	
Win	1–0	Andre Daniels	Submission (rear-naked choke)	Absolute Fighting Championships 19	October 21, 2006	1	2:30	Boca Raton, Florida, United States	
