= Valley and range sequence-Southern Yuma County =

Landform in Arizona, United States

Coordinates: 32.4°N 113.7°W

2-representative valleys between Block-faulted mountain ranges-(cross-section).

The Valley and range sequence-Southern Yuma County is a 3-Valley sequence of NW–by–SE trending block faulted valleys and mountains. About eleven major mountain ranges connect to each other in four, (mostly parallel), mountain sequences.

This regional parallel valley-mountain sequence ends at the Gila River valley at the north; to the south, it extends to the Gran Desierto de Altar of northwestern Mexico; the sequence is a remnant of the Basin and Range system.

== List of valleys ==
- Coyote Wash and Lechuguilla Desert
- Mohawk Valley (Arizona)
- San Cristobal Valley

== Table of mountain ranges ==
The three valleys lay mostly between these perimeter mountain sequences.

West Sequence North	W-Central block	E-Central block	East Sequence North
Gila River Valley	Gila River Valley	Gila River Valley	Gila River Valley
Gila Mountains (Yuma County)	Wellton Hills and Baker Peaks	Mohawk Mountains	Aztec Hills
Gila Mountains (Yuma County)	Copper Mountains	Mohawk Mountains	Aguila Mountains
Tinajas Altas Mountains and Butler Mountains)	W:Cabeza Prieta and Tule Mountains; E:Sierra Pinta	Bryan Mountains and Antelope Hills	Granite Mountains (Arizona)
Tinajas Altas Mountains and Butler Mountains)	W:Cabeza Prieta and Tule Mountains; E:Sierra Pinta	Bryan Mountains and Antelope Hills	xxxxxx
West Sequence South	W-Central block	E-Central block	East Sequence South

== See also ==
- Fault-block mountain
