= Ligurta, Arizona =

- Populated place
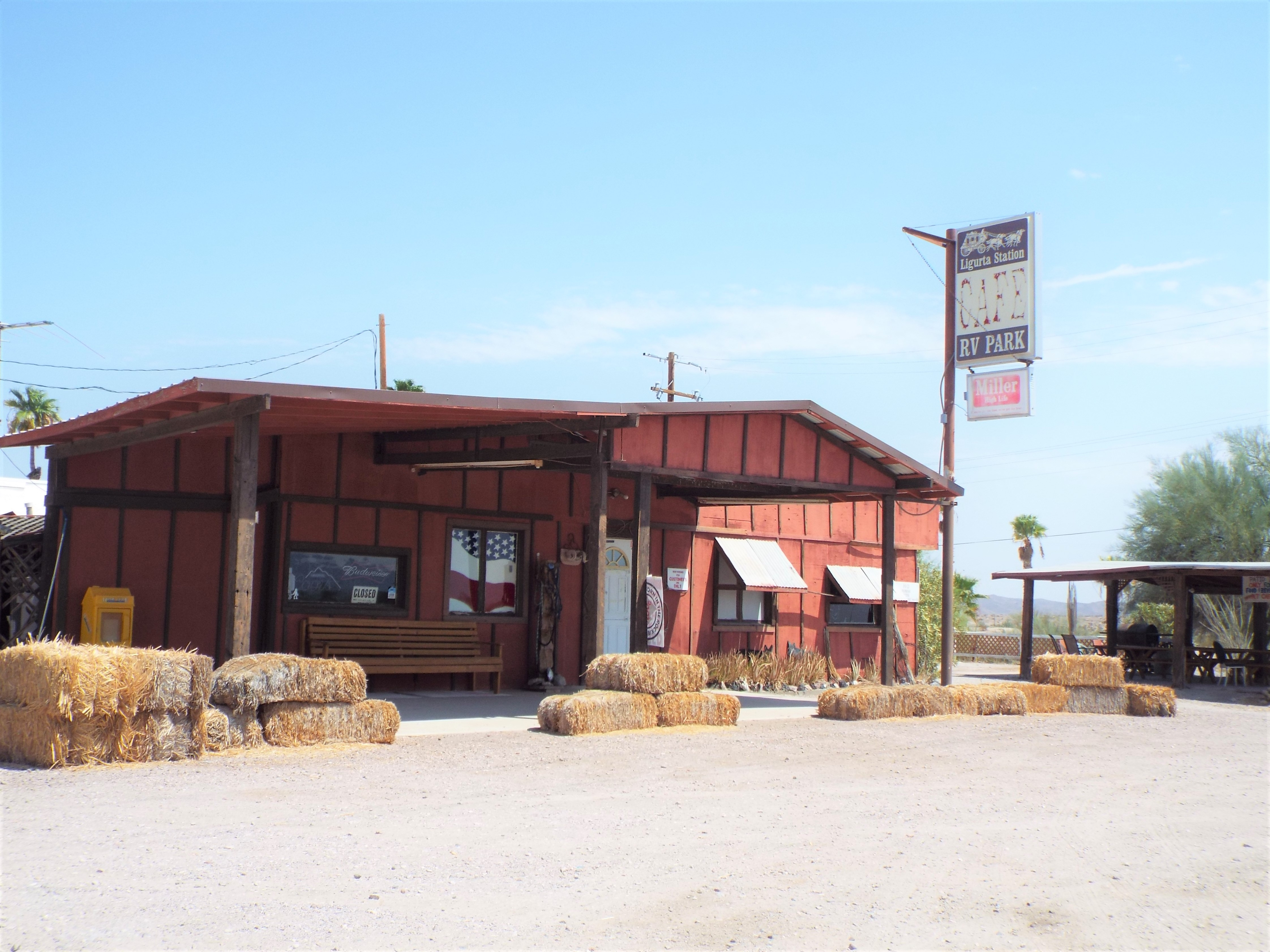
- Ligurta Station

- Location within the state of Arizona Ligurta (the United States)
- Coordinates: 32°40′28″N 114°17′42″W
- Country: United States
- State: Arizona
- County: Yuma
- Elevation: 233 ft (71 m)
- Time zone: UTC-7 (Mountain (MST))
  - Summer (DST): UTC-7 (MST)
- Area code: 928
- FIPS code: 04-40980
- GNIS feature ID: 24494

Ligurta is a populated place situated in Yuma County, Arizona, United States. It has an estimated elevation of 233 feet (71 m) above sea level. It is located in the Dome Valley south of the Gila River. Established as a railroad station on the Sunset Route circa 1880, it lies on the former US Route 80 just east of the Gila Mountains.

== Etymology ==
The name Ligurta could be derived from the Spanish word for "lizard", lagarto.
