= Mohawk Valley (Arizona) =

Valley in Yuma County, Arizona

Coordinates: 32.686°N 114.194°W

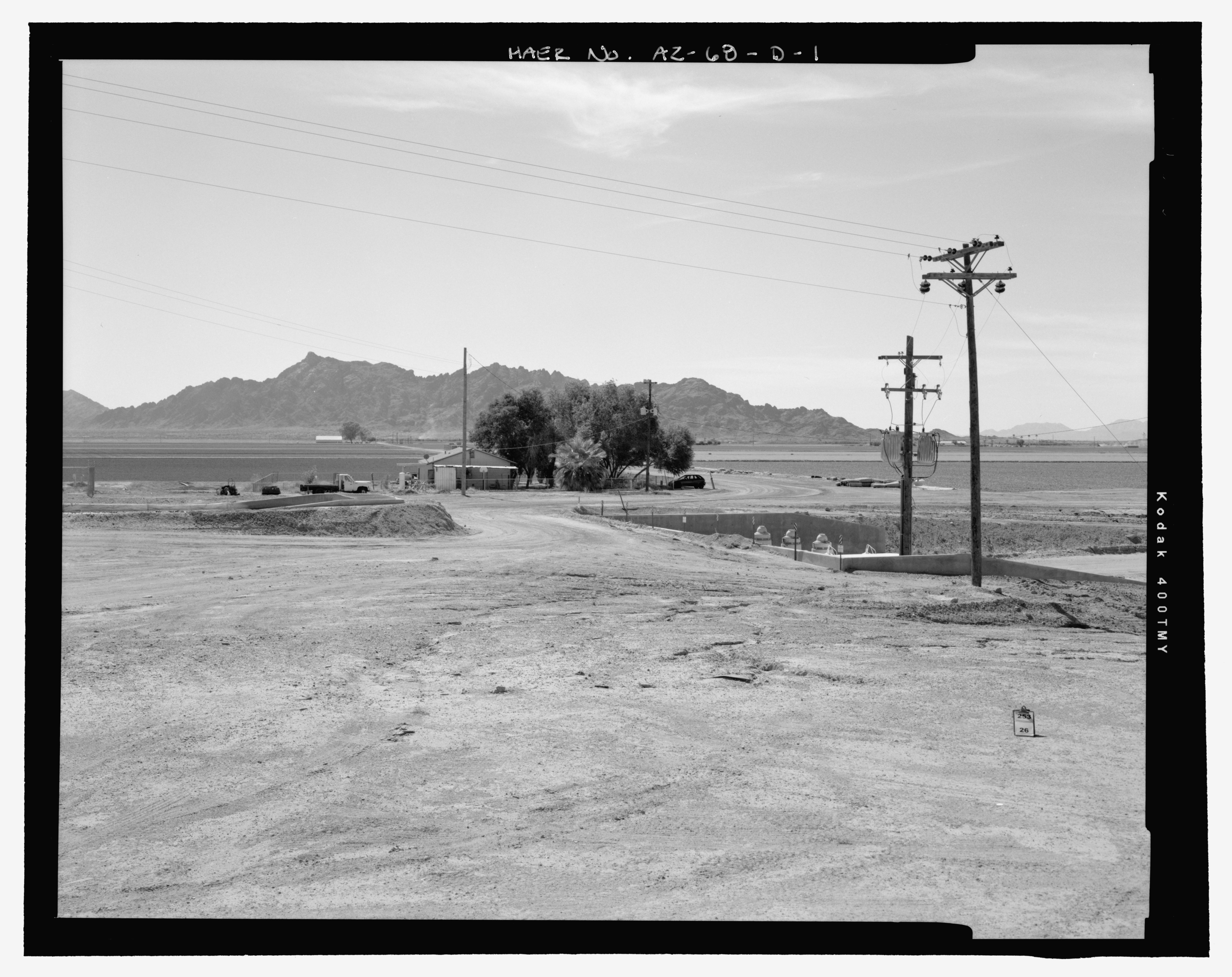
Mohawk Mountains across the downslope region of Mohawk Valley with the Lower Gila River Valley.

The Mohawk Valley is a valley in the lower regions of the western Gila River Valley in southwestern Arizona in the western Sonoran Desert.

The Mohawk Valley along the Gila River proper contains the agricultural communities of Wellton, Noah, Roll, and Tacna. This river stretch of the valley is mostly east-west trending, and extends northeasterly upstream to the adjacent Hyder Valley; to the west the Gila River turns northwest through the Dome Valley which lies between the Gila Mountains and the Muggins Mountains Wilderness on the northeast.

The southern portion of the Mohawk Valley is an extensive plain extending south, and uphill towards Sonora, Mexico and the valley extends, on its eastern end, southwards, ending at the Tule Desert and the Sierra Pinta on the west; the eastern side of this southern stretch of the valley is bordered by the Mohawk and Bryan Mountains. Much of this part of the valley is in the Barry M. Goldwater Air Force Range.

== See also ==
- Valley and range sequence-Southern Yuma County
