= Antelope Union High School =

Coordinates: 32.6923°N 114.0227°W

Location
- 9168 S. Avenue 36E; Wellton, Arizona 85356; United States

Information
- School type: Public high school
- Established: 1952 (74 years ago)
- School board: List of Members Jared Osborn, President Laura Noel, Vice President Nydia Monge, Member Martha Yardley-Jones, Member Michelle Jones, Member
- School district: Antelope Union High School District #50
- Superintendent: Michael Deiana
- CEEB code: 030535
- Principal: Michael Deiana
- Grades: 9-12
- Enrollment: 188 (2023-2024)
- Colors: Red and blue
- Mascot: Ram
- Website: www.antelopeunion.org

Antelope Union High School is a high school outside of Wellton, Arizona. It is the only high school in the Antelope Union High School District and serves eastern Yuma County.

== Notable alumnus ==
- Aaron Simpson - 4-time Arizona Wrestling State Champion; professional mixed martial artist, formerly competing in the UFC
