= Tule Mountains =

Mountain range in the US state of Arizona and the Mexican state of Sonora

Coordinates: 32°11′09″N 113°47′38″W

The Tule Mountains is a mountain range in Yuma County, Arizona. There is a diverse flora and fauna population within the Tule Mountains; one of the notable trees found in this mountain range is the elephant tree (Bursera microphylla).

== See also ==
- Gila Mountains
