= Wellton, Arizona =

Town in Yuma County, Arizona

Wellton
- Town
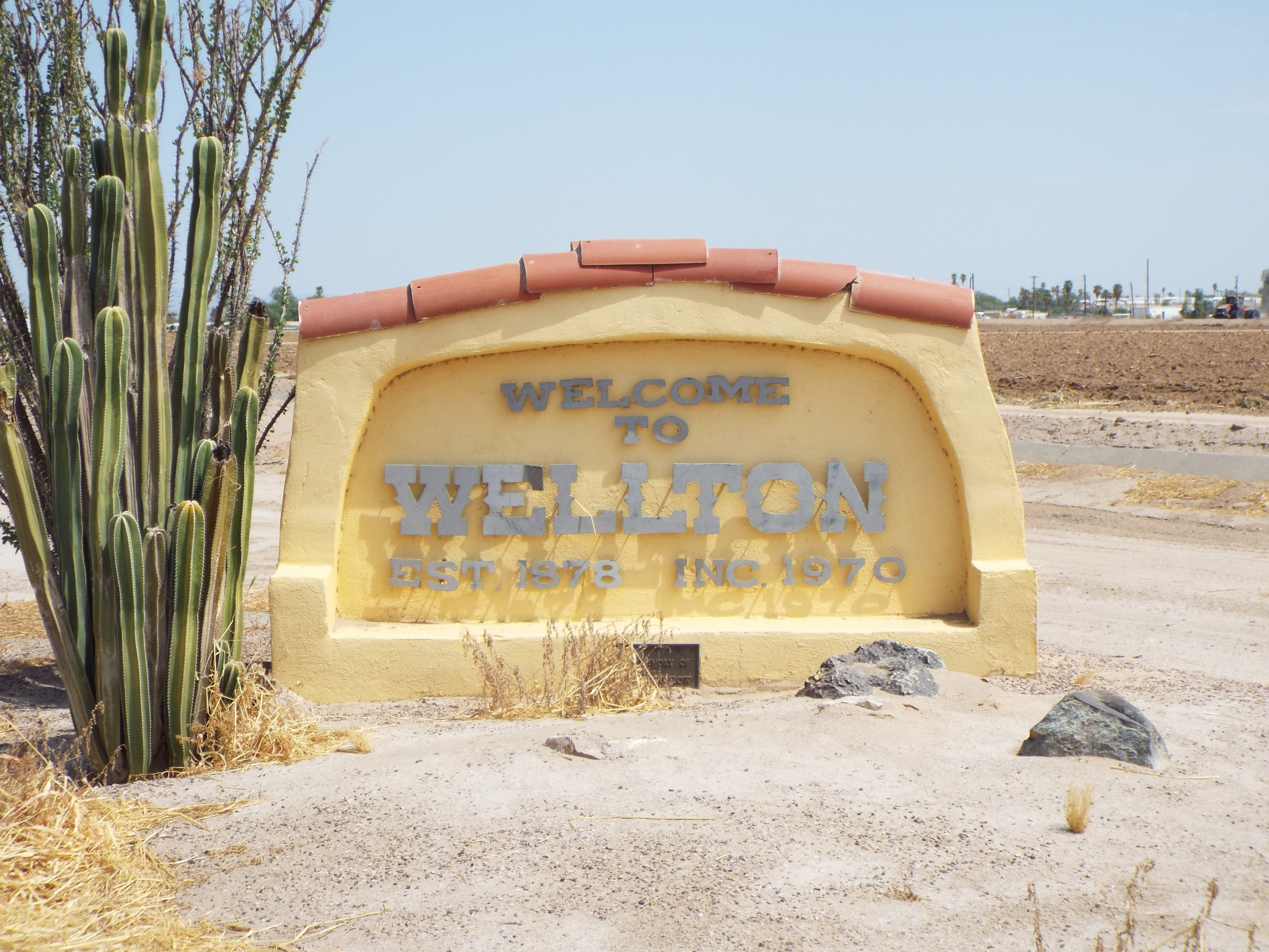
- "Welcome to Wellton" sign

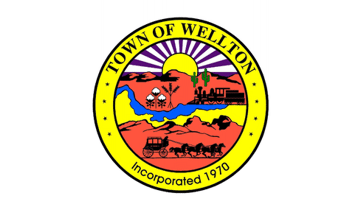
- Flag

- Location of Wellton in Yuma County, Arizona

- Location in Arizona Location in the United States
- Coordinates: 32°38′17″N 114°12′27″W
- Country: United States
- State: Arizona
- County: Yuma
- Established: 1904
- Incorporated: 1970

Area
  - Total: 28.88 sq mi (74.79 km^{2})
  - Land: 28.88 sq mi (74.79 km^{2})
  - Water: 0 sq mi (0.00 km^{2})
- Elevation: 246 ft (75 m)

Population (2020)
  - Total: 2,375
  - Density: 82.2/sq mi (31.75/km^{2})
- Time zone: UTC-7 (MST (no DST))
- ZIP code: 85356
- Area code: 928
- FIPS code: 04-81480
- GNIS feature ID: 2413467
- Website: www.welltonaz.gov

Wellton is a town in Yuma County, Arizona, United States. According to the 2020 census, the population of the town is 2,375. It is part of the Yuma metropolitan area.

== Geography ==
According to the United States Census Bureau, the town has a total area of 28.88 square miles (74.8 km^{2}), all land.

Wellton is located along Interstate 8 and the former route of U.S. Route 80. The town was named after the wells providing water for the railroad. Wellton's history is deeply rooted in agriculture, and the town prides itself on its rich farming heritage. The region's fertile soil and abundant water supply have made it an ideal location for growing crops such as lettuce, onions, and cotton. Visitors can learn about the town's agricultural past at the Wellton Mohawk Valley Museum, which showcases artifacts and exhibits that tell the story of the town's early settlers and their contributions to agricultural development in the area.

== Demographics ==
Historical population
Census	Pop.	Note	%±
1970	957		—
1980	911		−4.8%
1990	1,066		17.0%
2000	1,829		71.6%
2010	2,882		57.6%
2020	2,375		−17.6%
2022 (est.)	2,519	▲	6.1%
U.S. Decennial Census

=== 2020 census ===
As of the 2020 census, Wellton had a population of 2,375. The median age was 62.8 years. 14.5% of residents were under the age of 18 and 45.5% of residents were 65 years of age or older. For every 100 females there were 96.1 males, and for every 100 females age 18 and over there were 98.2 males age 18 and over.

0.0% of residents lived in urban areas, while 100.0% lived in rural areas.

There were 1,119 households in Wellton, of which 19.0% had children under the age of 18 living in them. Of all households, 53.6% were married-couple households, 17.7% were households with a male householder and no spouse or partner present, and 21.7% were households with a female householder and no spouse or partner present. About 29.0% of all households were made up of individuals and 19.6% had someone living alone who was 65 years of age or older.

There were 2,266 housing units, of which 50.6% were vacant. The homeowner vacancy rate was 0.9% and the rental vacancy rate was 11.4%.

Racial composition as of the 2020 census
Race	Number	Percent
White	1,651	69.5%
Black or African American	14	0.6%
American Indian and Alaska Native	31	1.3%
Asian	15	0.6%
Native Hawaiian and Other Pacific Islander	3	0.1%
Some other race	326	13.7%
Two or more races	335	14.1%
Hispanic or Latino (of any race)	841	35.4%

=== 2000 census ===
At the 2000 census, there were 1,829 people, 700 households, and 552 families in the town. The population density was 727.3 inhabitants per square mile (280.8/km^{2}). There were 1,144 housing units at an average density of 454.9 per square mile (175.6/km^{2}). The racial makeup of the town was 68.2% White, 2.0% Black or African American, 1.4% Native American, 0.3% Asian, 0.2% Pacific Islander, 25.4% from other races, and 2.5% from two or more races. 40.7% of the population were Hispanic or Latino of any race.

Of the 700 households 25.7% had children under the age of 18 living with them, 69.4% were married couples living together, 6.1% had a female householder with no husband present, and 21.1% were non-families. 17.7% of households were one person and 10.7% were one person aged 65 or older. The average household size was 2.61 and the average family size was 2.95.

The age distribution was 23.9% under the age of 18, 6.7% from 18 to 24, 17.4% from 25 to 44, 24.0% from 45 to 64, and 28.0% 65 or older. The median age was 47 years. For every 100 females, there were 98.6 males. For every 100 females age 18 and over, there were 96.9 males.

The median household income was $27,045 and the median family income was $30,071. Males had a median income of $27,292 versus $21,250 for females. The per capita income for the town was $13,644. About 16.1% of families and 21.3% of the population were below the poverty line, including 36.9% of those under age 18 and 10.0% of those age 65 or over.

== Population ==
During the winter season, the population virtually doubles with snowbirds from the western US as well as the western provinces of Canada filling up the many RV parks. Wellton is becoming a popular retirement destination.

The town currently operates two 18-hole golf courses that are a magnet for winter visitors. Much development is happening centered on the newer golf course and also in more rural areas as well.

== Notable Person ==
- Derald Langham (1913–1991), agricultural geneticist

== Economy ==
Five Rivers Cattle Feeding operates a feedlot outside Wellton. US Border Patrol has a station outside of Wellton.

== Transportation ==
- Yuma County Area Transit
- Interstate 8

== Education ==
Wellton is in the Wellton Elementary School District and the Antelope Union High School District.

== Gallery ==
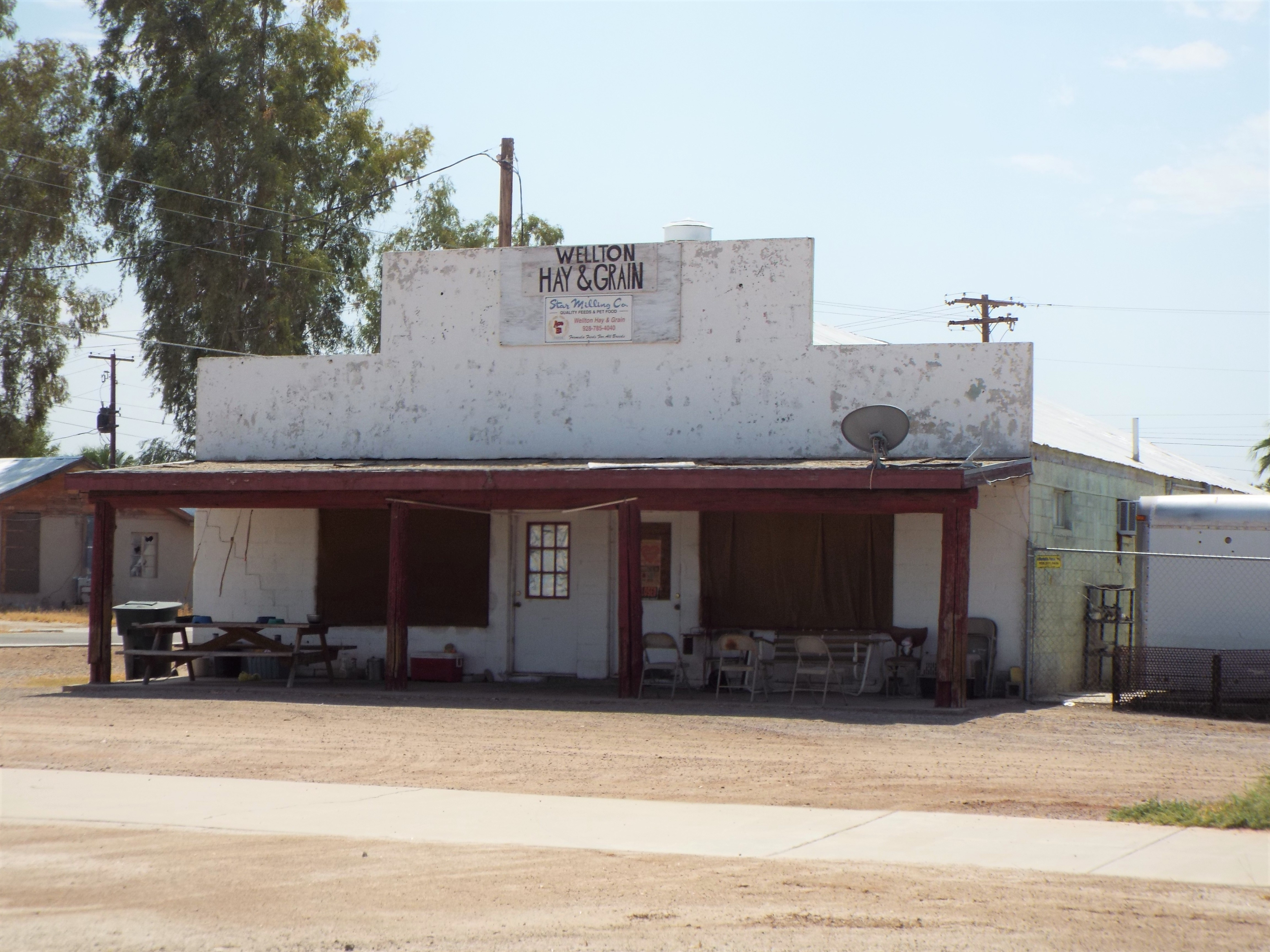
Wellton Hay and Grain Building-1935

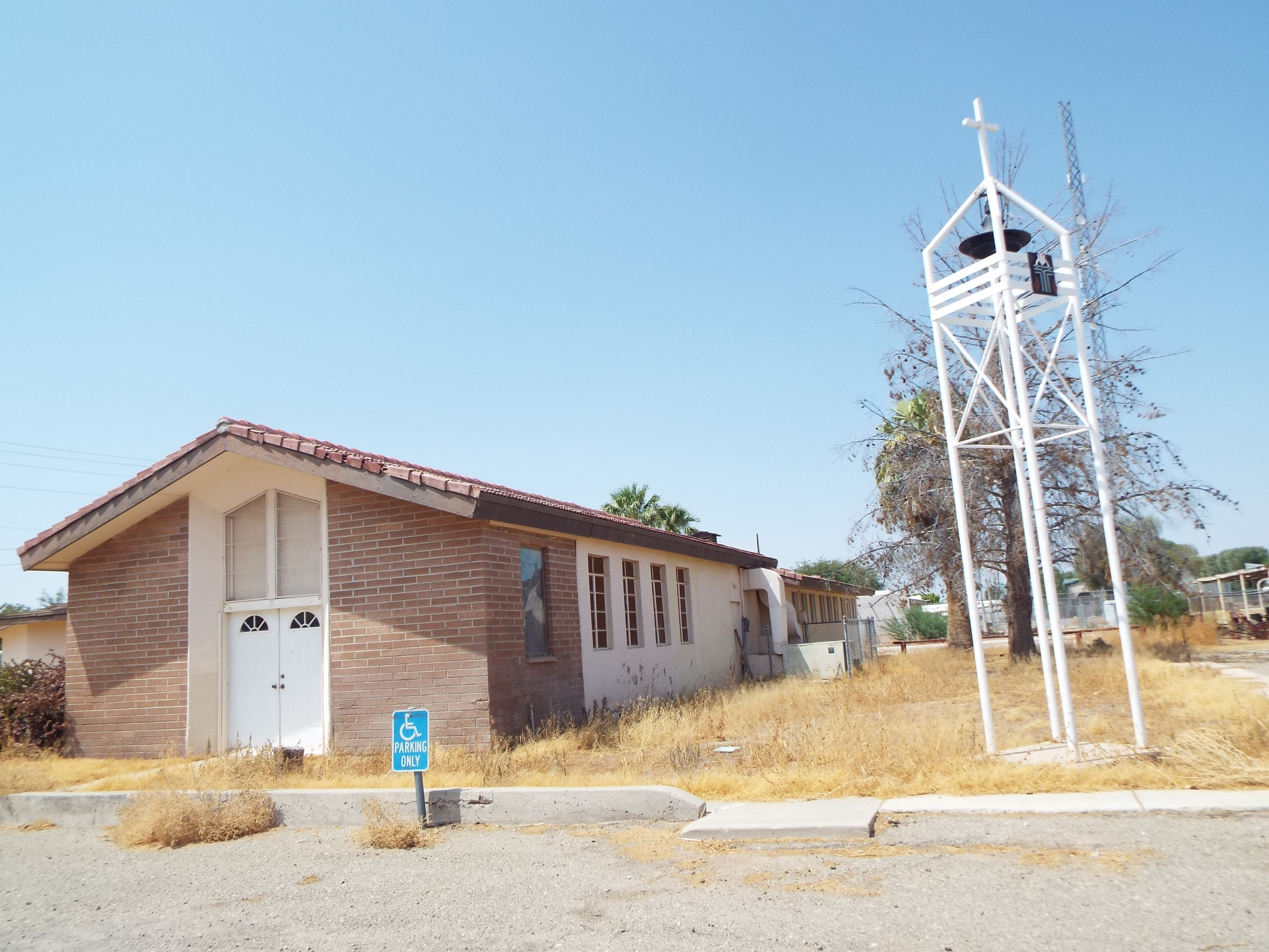
Wellton Community Presbyterian Church

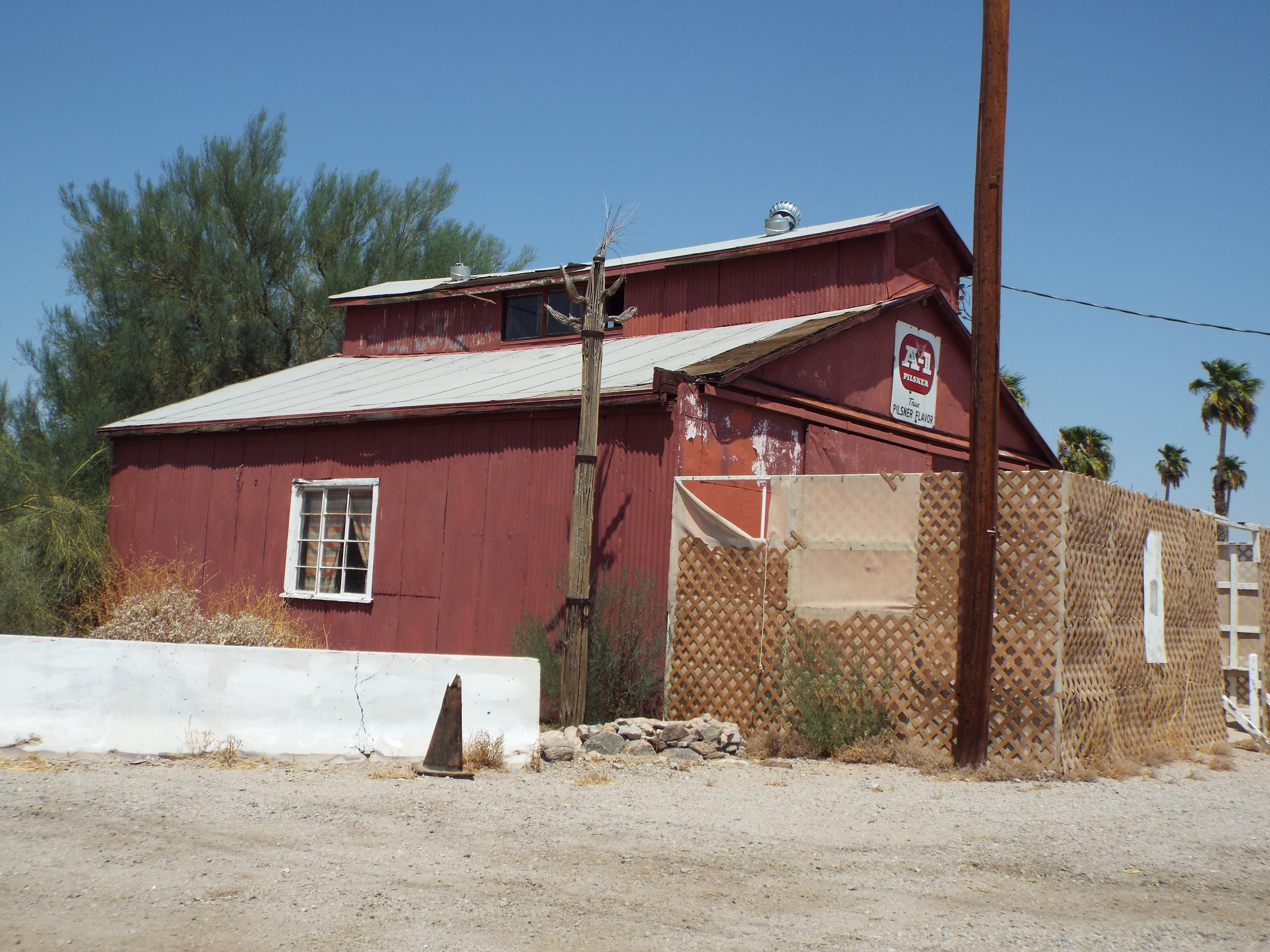
Old Barn
