= Juan Bautista de Anza National Historic Trail =

United States National Park Service unit

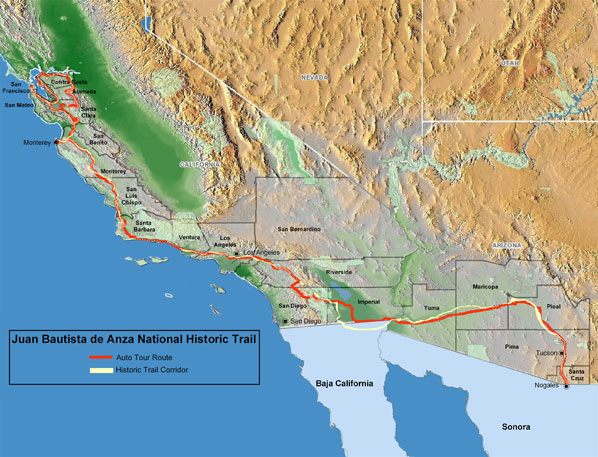
Map of Juan Bautista de Anza National Historic Trail routes in Arizona and California

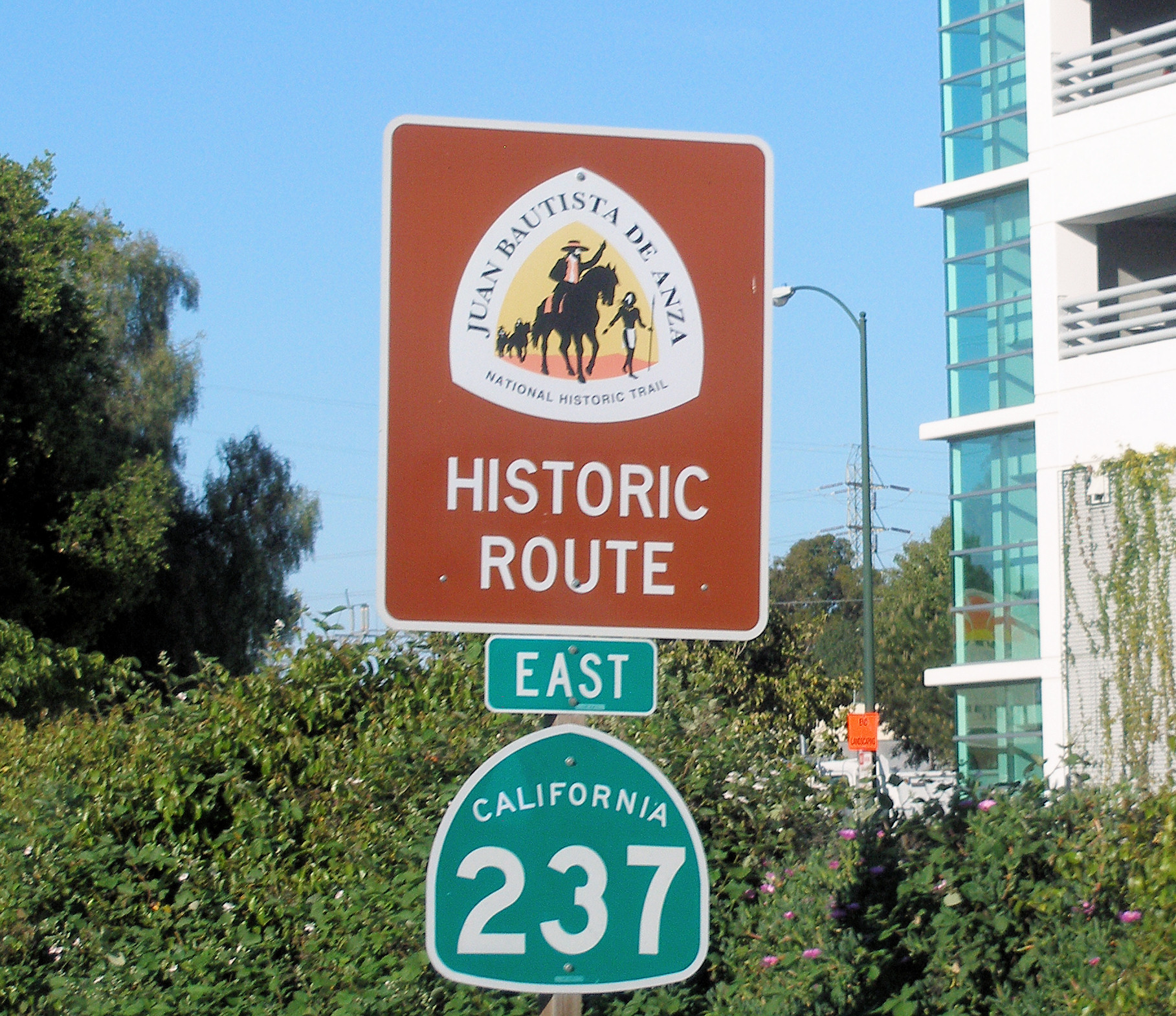
California road signage for the Anza Trail

The Juan Bautista de Anza National Historic Trail is a 1,210-mile (1,950 km) trail extending from Nogales on the U.S.-Mexico border in Arizona, through the California desert and coastal areas in Southern California and the Central Coast region to San Francisco. The trail commemorates the 1775–1776 land route that Spanish commander Juan Bautista de Anza took from the Sonora y Sinaloa Province of New Spain in Colonial Mexico through to Las Californias Province. The goal of the trip was to establish a mission and presidio on San Francisco Bay. The trail was an attempt to ease the course of Spanish colonization of California by establishing a major land route north for many to follow. It was used for about five years before being closed by the Quechan (Yuma) Indians in 1781 and kept closed for the next 40 years. It is a National Historic Trail administered by the National Park Service and was also designated a National Millennium Trail.

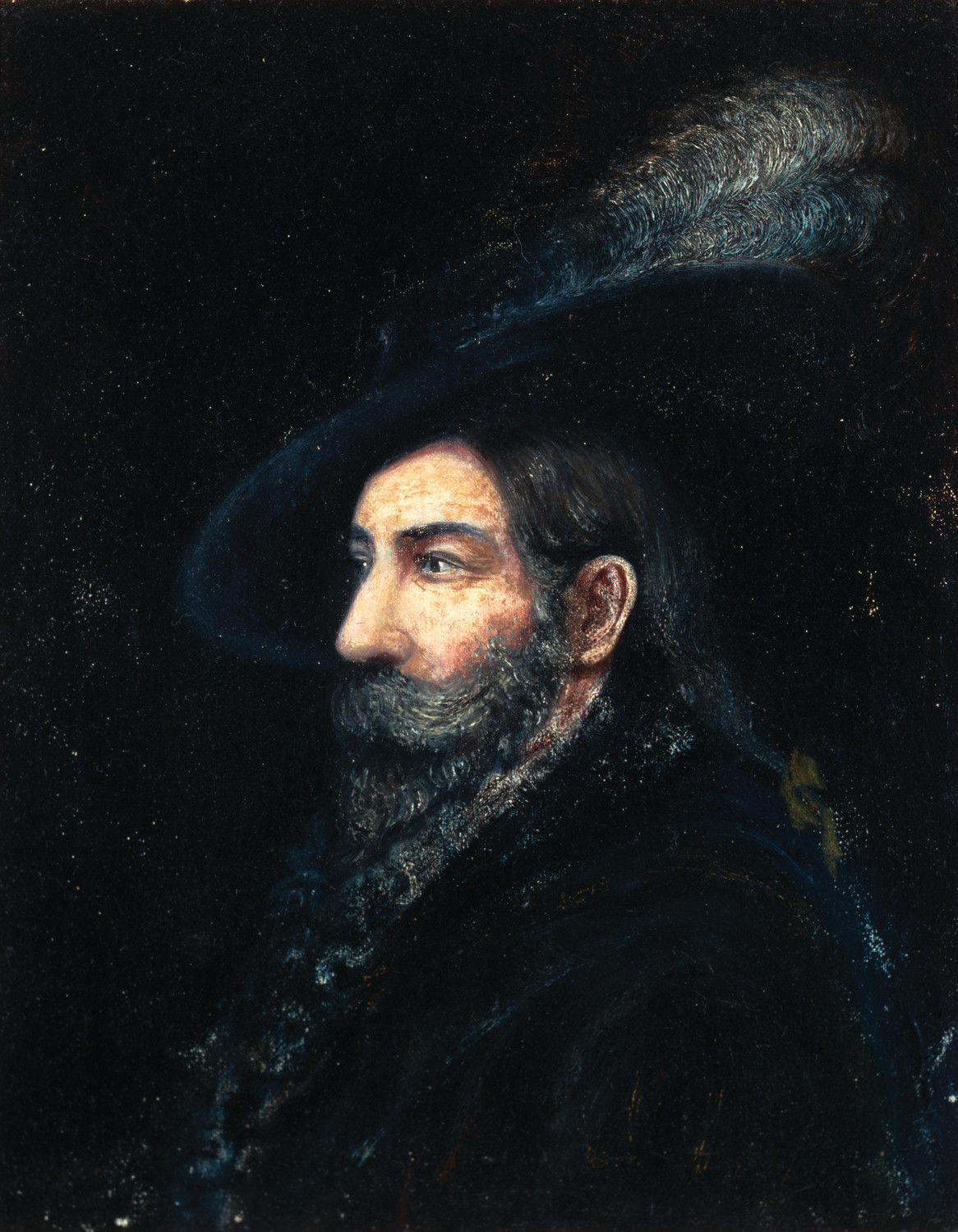
Juan Bautista de Anza.

== History ==
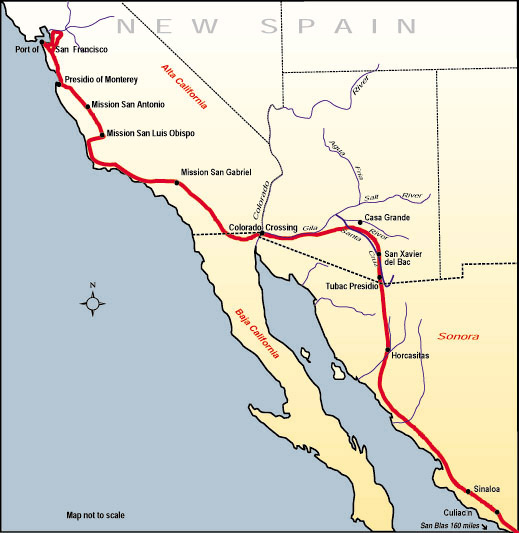
Map of the route Juan Bautista de Anza travelled in 1775–76 from Mexico to today's San Francisco via the Gila River corridor and the Yuma Crossing of the Colorado River.

=== 1st California Trip ===
Juan Bautista de Anza led an exploratory expedition on January 8, 1774, with 3 padres, 20 soldiers, 11 servants, 35 mules, 65 cattle, and 140 horses set forth from Tubac Presidio, south of present-day Tucson, Arizona. They went across the Sonoran desert to California from Mexico by swinging south of the Gila River to avoid Apache attacks until they hit the Colorado River at the Yuma Crossing—about the only way across the Colorado River. The friendly Quechan (Yuma) Indians (2,000–3,000) they encountered there were growing most of their food using irrigation systems and had already imported pottery, horses, wheat and a few other crops from New Mexico. After crossing the Colorado to avoid the impassable Algodones Dunes, they followed the river about 50 miles (80 km) to approximately Arizona's southwest corner on the Colorado River. There Anza turned westward following along a seasonal dis-tributary river of the Colorado until it turned northwest near present-day Mexicali, Mexico and then turned north through present-day Imperial Valley. Anza then turned northwest again crossing the remaining desert and mountains before reaching the coastal valleys of Southern California and the Mission San Gabriel Arcángel near the future city of Los Angeles, California. The Pueblo de Los Angeles would be established in 1781 by eleven families recruited mostly from Sonora y Sinaloa Province. It took Anza about 74 days to make this initial reconnaissance trip to establish a land route into California.

On his return trip he retraced his path to the Yuma Crossing of the Colorado River and then went down the Gila River corridor until reaching the Santa Cruz River (Arizona) corridor and continuing on to Tubac, Arizona. The return trip only took 23 days as he now had found a trail with sufficient water to make land access to California possible. On the Gila River, he encountered several extensive villages of Pima (Akimel O'odham) Indians. These were a peaceful and populous agricultural tribe with extensive crops and irrigation systems located along the river.

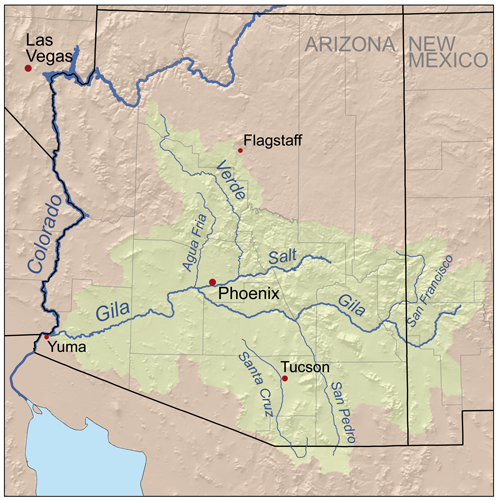
Map of the drainage basin of the Gila River in Arizona, New Mexico and Sonora in the United States and Mexico.

=== 2nd California Trip ===
In Anza's second trip (1775–1776) he returned to California via the Gila River path he had discovered with 240 friars, soldiers and colonists with their families. They took 695 horses and mules, 385 Texas Longhorn bulls and cows with them—starting the cattle and horse industry in California. In California, the cattle and horses had few enemies and plentiful grass in all but drought years and essentially grew and multiplied as feral animals, doubling roughly every two years. They started from Tubac Arizona on October 22, 1775 and arrived at San Francisco Bay on March 28, 1776. There they established the Presidio of San Francisco, followed by Mission San Francisco de Asís (Mission Dolores) – the future city of San Francisco, California.

In 1779, Father Francisco Garcés was assigned to establish a mission at Yuma crossing of the Colorado River. In 1780, the Spanish established two combination missions and pueblos at the Yuma Colorado River Crossing of the Anza trail: Mission San Pedro y San Pablo de Bicuñer and Mission Puerto de Purísima Concepción. Both these pueblos and missions were on the California side of the Colorado River near the mouth of the Gila River but were administered by the Arizona authorities.

=== Later use ===
The settlement of Los Angeles, California involved two groups totaling 44 persons including 22 children. One group under Alfèrez Ramon Laso de la Vega crossed the Gulf of California on launches and then travelled overland to San Diego and up to the San Gabriel Mission.

The second group, under Fernando Rivera y Moncada, took an overland route over the Anza trail 1,200 miles (1,900 km) through the desert from Sinaloa Mexico. They passed through the new missions on the Colorado River, Mission Puerto de Purísima Concepción and Mission San Pedro y San Pablo de Bicuñer. The group arrived at the Colorado River in June 1781. Rivera y Moncada sent most of his party ahead, but he stayed behind to rest the livestock before continuing their drive across the desert. His party would never reach San Gabriel. In July, Rivera was killed along with the local missionaries, settlers, and travelers with them in the Yuma revolt of the Quechan Indians in 1781.

The Quechan and Mojave Indians rose up against the party for encroaching on their farmlands and for other abuses inflicted by the soldiers. On July 17–19, 1781, the Yuma (Quechan) Indians, in a dispute with the New Spain government and church, destroyed both missions and pueblos – killing 103 soldiers, colonists and Friars and capturing about 80 more (mostly women and children). Included in the casualties were Fernando Rivera y Moncada military commander and former governor of California and Father Francisco Garcés founder of the missions on the Colorado River. In four well-supported punitive expeditions in 1782 and 1783 against the Quechans, the Spanish managed to gather their dead and ransom nearly all the prisoners but failed to re-open the Anza Trail. The Yuma Crossing and the Anza trail were closed for Spanish traffic and would stay closed until the late 1820s. As a result, California was nearly isolated again from land-based travel, and about the only way into California from Mexico would now be a 40- to 60-day voyage by sea. According to historian David Weber, the Yuma revolt turned California into an "island" and Arizona into a "cul de sac", severing Arizona-California and Mexican land connections before they could be firmly established.

== Modern touring ==
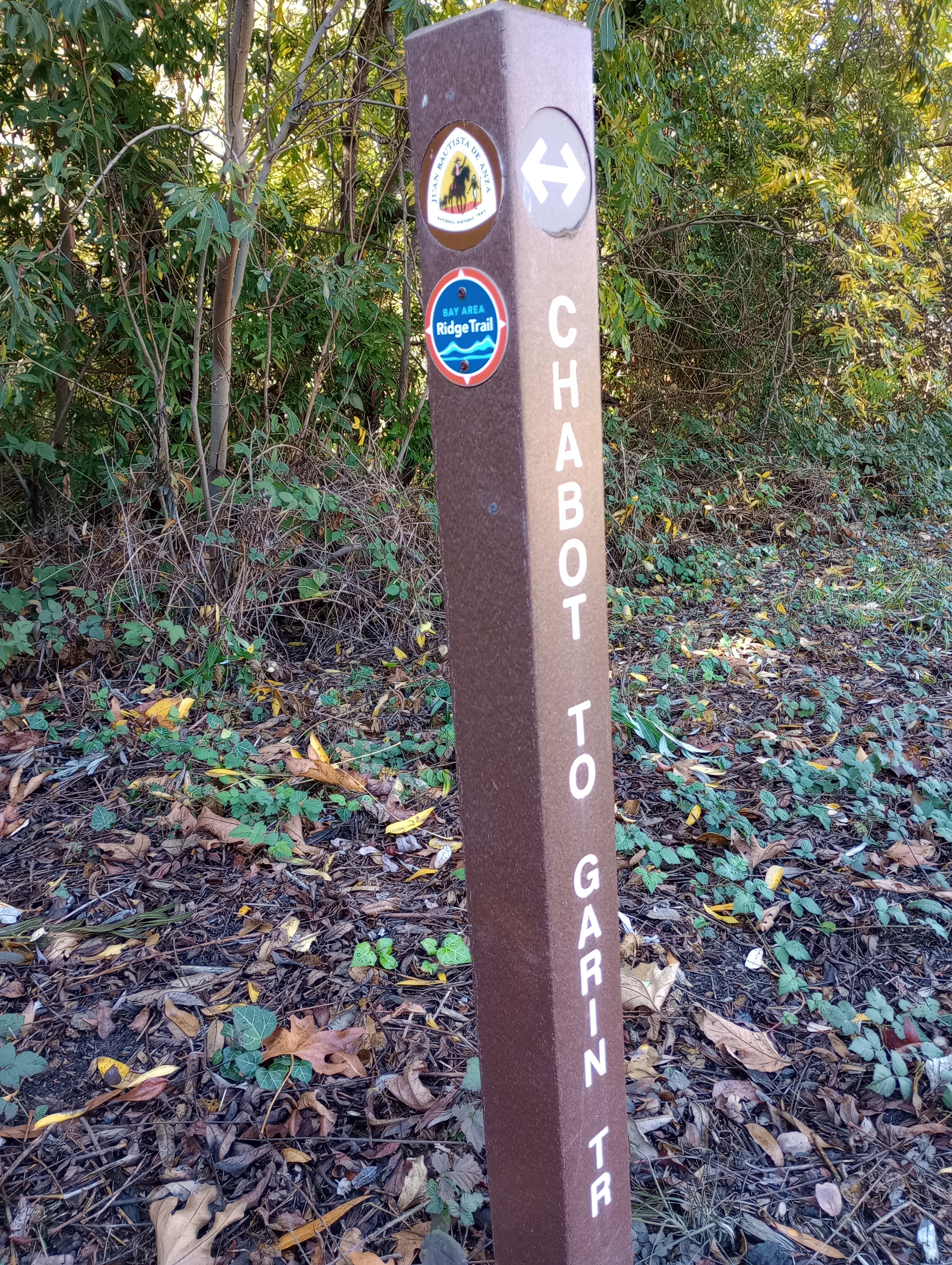
A hiking version of the Juan Bautista de Anza Trail found near the Cull Canyon Regional Recreation Area main entrance. This segment overlaps the Bay Area Ridge Trail, and the East Bay Regional Park District-managed Chabot to Garin trail.

Along the Juan Bautista de Anza National Historic Trail route, visitors can experience the varied landscapes similar to those the expedition saw; learn the stories of the expedition's events, members, and descendants; better understand the Native American diversity of cultures in their homelands and their guidance on the expedition; and appreciate the extent and lasting influences of Spanish colonial settlements in present-day Arizona and California. The Trail was designated a National Historic Trail in 1990 and a National Millennium Trail in 1999.

In 2005, Caltrans began posting signs on roads that overlap with the trail route so that California drivers could follow the trail.

=== Designated sites ===
The National Park Service has developed a printed and online: Brochure Map for driving and guides for auto tours, hiking sections, and designated Historic sites, landmarks, and museums open to the public. Schedules of Anza celebrations and other historic events are on an updated NPS: What to Do-Events Guide. The detailed Anza Trail Maps by County show more points of interest, trailheads, and local lore.

=== Growth ===
The Juan Bautista de Anza National Historic Trail project is growing as local, state, and NPS efforts establish more trails, signage, and interpretive programs. The Trail is inspiring activities at existing municipal parks, neighborhood greenbelts, regional parks, and large open space preserves.

== See also ==
- Las Californias – 1786–1804
- Alta California – 1804–1848
- Spanish missions in California
- History of Arizona
- History of California through 1899
- Spanish missions in the Sonoran Desert
- California Coastal Trail
