= Spanish missions in Arizona =

17th to 19th-century Catholic religious outposts

Beginning in the 16th century Spain established missions throughout New Spain (consisting of Mexico and portions of what today are the Southwestern United States) in order to facilitate colonization of these lands.

== History ==
=== Early Franciscan missions ===
The indigenous peoples of Arizona remained unknown to European explorers until 1540 when Spanish explorer Pedro de Tovar (who was part of the Coronado expedition) encountered the Hopi while searching for the legendary Seven Cities of Gold. Contact with Europeans remained infrequent until three missions were established in 1629 in what is now northeastern Arizona.

In 1680, the Pueblo Revolt resulted in the destruction of all three missions, greatly limiting Spanish influence in the region. Subsequent attempts to reestablish the missions in Hopi villages were met with repeated failures. The former mission is still visible today as a ruin.

=== Jesuit missions ===
In the spring of 1687, the Jesuit missionary Eusebio Francisco Kino lived and worked with the Native Americans in the area called the Pimería Alta, or "Upper Pima Country," which presently includes the Mexican state of Sonora and the southern portion of Arizona. During Father Eusebio Kino's stay in the Pimería Alta, he founded over twenty missions in eight mission districts. In Arizona, unlike Mexico, missionization proceeded slowly.

Father Kino founded missions San Xavier and San Gabriel at the Piman communities of Bac and Guevavi along the Santa Cruz River.

=== Late Franciscan missions ===
Following the expulsion of the Jesuits in 1767, the Franciscans from the college of Santa Cruz in Querétaro took over responsibility in the Pimería Alta missions. Meanwhile, other Franciscans from the college of San Fernando in Mexico City under the leadership of Junípero Serra, were assigned to replace the Jesuits in the Baja California missions of the lower Las Californias Province.

Under the administration of Franciscan friar and explorer Francisco Garcés, three additional missions were established with the goal of establishing a permanent connection between the missions of Las Californias and Pimería Alta. However, following a Quechan raid in 1781 that destroyed two mission near present-day Yuma, the two regions remained isolated. This greatly limited the expansion of Spanish influence throughout the lower Colorado River.

Following the Mexican War of Independence and the expulsion of all Spanish-born priests from the region in 1828, the remaining missions were gradually abandoned. Mission San Xavier del Bac was the last mission to be abandoned, with the last priest leaving for Spain in 1837.

== Missions ==
List of missions in Arizona, from year of first established
Name	Image	Location	Date founded	Order	Notes	Sources
Mission San Francisco de Oraibi		35.87344, -110.63634	1629	Franciscans	Destroyed during the 1680 Pueblo Revolt. In ruins.	
Mission San Bernardo de Aguatubi		35.72529, -110.27803	1629	Franciscans	Destroyed during the 1680 Pueblo Revolt. Rebuilt in the 1690s before it and the surrounding village was destroyed in 1700. In ruins.	
Mission San Bartolomé de Shungópove		Second Mesa	1629	Franciscans	Destroyed during the 1680 Pueblo Revolt.	
Mission Los Santos Ángeles de Guevavi		31.41007, -110.90198	1691	Jesuits	Abandoned in 1775. The church ruins date to 1751. It later became a visita of San José de Tumacacori around 1773.	
Mission San Xavier del Bac		32.10723, -111.00797	1692	Jesuits	1692–1770, 1783–1837, 1859–present. The extant mission church was completed in 1797.	
Mission San Cayetano de Calabazas		31.45252, -110.95945	1756	Jesuits	It was founded as a visita of Mission Los Santos Ángeles de Guevavi (and some time after served Mission San José de Tumacácori). It later became a mission but was downgraded back to a visita of Mission Los Santos Ángeles de Guevavi in 1784. Abandoned in 1786.	
Mission San José de Tumacácori		31.56861, -111.0509	1757	Jesuits	Located west of the site of the visita San Cayetano del Tumacácori. Abandoned in 1828.	
Mission San Cosme y Damián de Tucsón		32.2148, -110.98463	1768	Franciscans	Established as a visita in 1692. Elevated to the status of mission in 1768. Abandoned in 1828. Non-extant.	
Mission Puerto de Purísima Concepción		32.73053, -114.61557	October 1780	Franciscans	Located in California but administered as part of the Pimería Alta missions. Destroyed during a Quechan raid from July 17–19, 1781. Non-extant. A reconstruction of the mission was completed in 1923, which currently serves as a parish church.	
Mission San Pedro y San Pablo de Bicuñer		32.81636, -114.51511	January 7, 1781	Franciscans	Located in California but administered as part of the Pimería Alta missions. Destroyed during a Quechan raid from July 17–19, 1781. Non-extant.	

== See also ==
On Spanish Missions in neighboring regions:

- Spanish missions in California
- Spanish missions in New Mexico
- Spanish missions in the Sonoran Desert (including Sonora and southern Arizona)

On general missionary history:

- Catholic Church and the Age of Discovery
- List of the oldest churches in Mexico

On colonial Spanish American history:

- Spanish colonization of the Americas
- California mission clash of cultures
