= Jabanimó =

Akimel O'odham leader involved in 1750s Native American uprisings

Jabanimó or Hawani Mo'o ("Raven's Head") was an Akimel O'odham leader involved in Native American uprisings during the 1750s, possibly including the 1751 Pima Revolt.

== Biography ==
Jabanimó was an O'odham chief originally from the Gila River area. Contemporary sources disagree on whether he was involved in the 1751 Pima Revolt. He organized native resistance along the Santa Cruz River, encouraging residents of Mission San Xavier del Bac and Mission San Cosme y Damián de Tucsón to resist the Jesuit missionaries.

In 1756, Jabanimó led a group of O'odham and Papagos against San Xavier del Bac. He was joined by surviving followers of Luis Oacpicagigua, led by Oacpicagigua's son Cipriano. Assisted by sympathetic native residents of Bac, the group looted the mission, including the church and the homes of natives loyal to the Jesuits. Resident missionary Alonso Ignacio Benito Espinosa escaped to Presidio San Ignacio de Tubac.

Governor Juan Antonio de Mendoza and Captain Francisco Elías Gonzalez led a punitive expedition in response, defeating Jabanimó and his followers near Gila Bend. Fifteen natives were killed, but Jabanimó himself survived by hiding among the reeds on the shore of the Gila River.
