= Alonso Espinosa =

Alonso Espinosa can refer to:

- Alonso de Espinosa, a sixteenth-century priest and historian
- Alonso Ignacio Benito Espinosa (1720–1786), a Jesuit missionary to New Spain
