= Cull Canyon Regional Recreation Area =

Regional park in Alameda County, California, US

Coordinates: 37.709097°N 122.056073°W

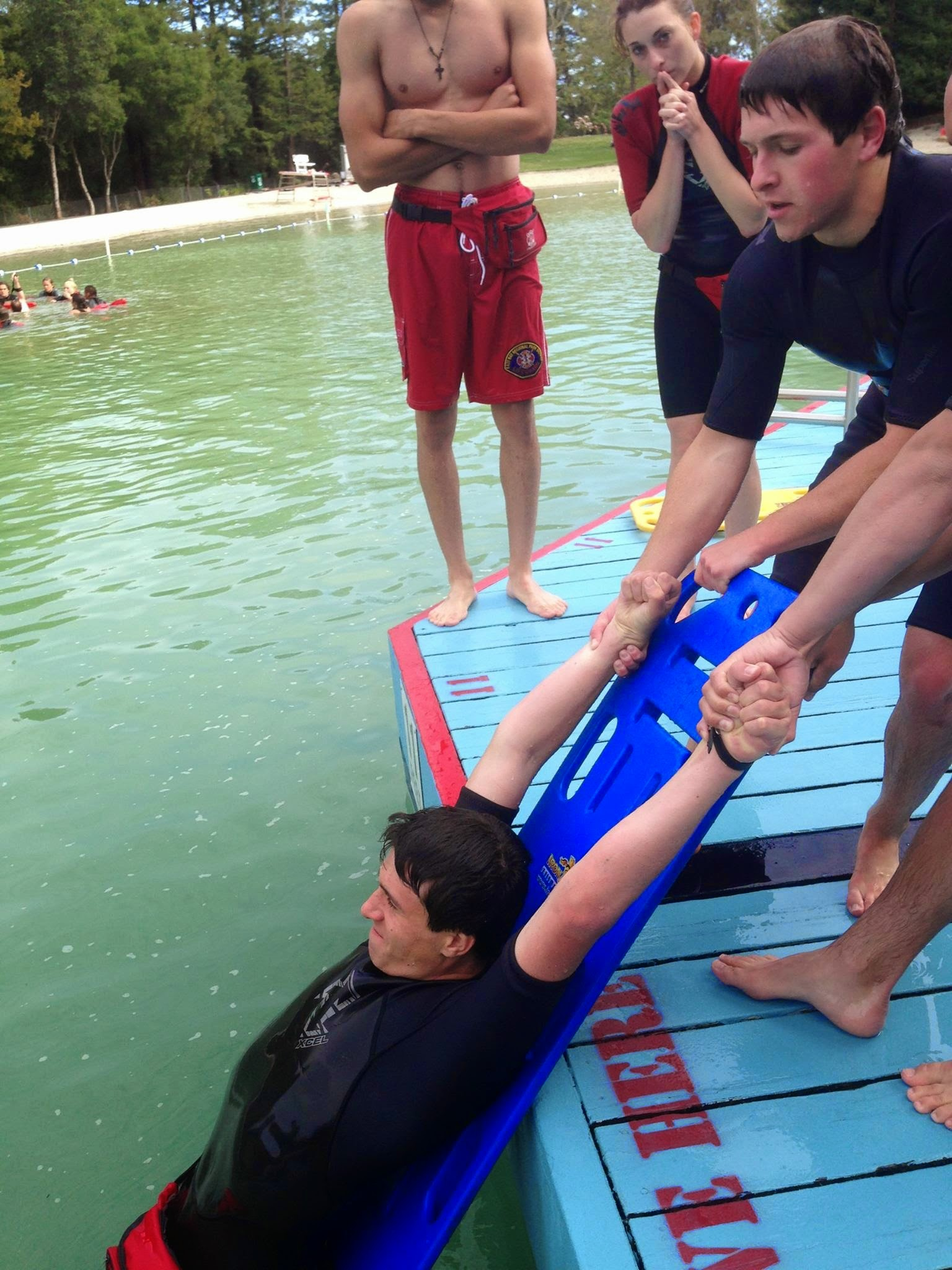
- Lifeguards training in the lagoon
- Interactive map of Cull Canyon Regional Recreation Area
- Type: Recreational area
- Location: Alameda County, California
- Nearest city: Hayward, California
- Area: 360 acres (1.5 km^{2})
- Operator: East Bay Regional Park District
- Open: Easter until Labor Day (swim area)
- Status: Open

Cull Canyon Regional Recreation Area (CCRRA) is a regional park located in Castro Valley, Alameda County, California. It is part of the East Bay Regional Park District (EBRPD) system.

== Aquatic facilities ==
CCRRA includes a 1.5 acres (0.0061 km^{2}) swim lagoon and formerly included a fishing lake that resulted from damming Cull Creek. (Note: The lagoon was separated from the main swim area by a secondary dam, so that the lagoon level remains constant even if the main reservoir level is drawn down during dry weather.) The swim area has a bathhouse, lawns, sandy beaches, and much shallow water for kids. EBRPD reports that "The [recreation area's] lagoon won the 1966 Governor's Design Award for Exceptional Distinction for Recreational Development in the category of landscape." The recreation area is open for swimming seasonally. The swim area is fenced and has a lifeguard on duty when the area is open. No dogs are allowed inside this area.

== Reservoir sedimentation issue ==
In 2014, the San Jose Mercury-News, a local newspaper, reported that the Cull Creek Reservoir Dam would likely be drained soon because it had been judged as seismically unsafe. This hazard was caused by tons of sediment that had deposited since the dam was constructed in 1963. (Note: The report should not have surprised anybody in authority. According to a 2007 article in the East Bay Times, the reservoir was originally 30 feet (9.1 m) deep, and designed to hold 101,000,000 US gallons (380,000 m^{3}) of water. By 2007, it could hold less than one-fifth of that quantity, even though a dredging operation in 2002-2003 had removed 290,000 cubic yards of sediment, which nearly restored the original capacity. The article reported that the state Division of Safety of Dams had set a deadline of July 1 for Alameda County to submit a report on progress making improvements.)

By 2014, the water layer was estimated to be only 6 feet (1.8 m) deep. The Alameda County Flood Control Manager, Hank Ackerman, said that the reservoir receives 12,000 to 20,000 cubic yards of silt and debris every year, which is trapped behind the dam. He added that the problem had reached a point where it caused a massive fish kill in August 2013, and that EBRPD had ceased to restock the reservoir with fish.

A temporary solution to the seismic concern was obtained in 2006 when engineers penetrated the concrete spillway with 12-inch pipe that relieved pressure on the dam by lowering the water level in the lake. Ackerman noted that dredging the lake to remove the sediment had been estimated to cost $16 million and require 28,000 round trips with double bottom dump semitrailers to remove the estimated 450,000 cubic yards of sediment. The dam would need to be reinforced after the silt is removed.

Almeda County engineers have proposed to notch the reservoir's weir. This would let water flow downstream, leaving the accumulated sediment behind. Ackerman said that cost would be less than $1 million, and that the seismic threat would be eliminated because the (California) Division of Safety of Dams would no longer consider it a dam if it didn't hold back water.”

== Hiking ==
The Chabot-to-Garin Regional Trail (part of the Bay Area Ridge Trail) runs along the east side of the Cull Canyon reservoir. The trail then leads north through property owned by the East Bay Municipal Utility District (EBMUD) for 6 miles (9.7 km) to EBMUD's Chabot staging area on Redwood Road. (Note: An EBMUD permit is required to hike on the trail that passes over EBMUD property.) The Willow View Trail leads from this point into Anthony Chabot Regional Park.

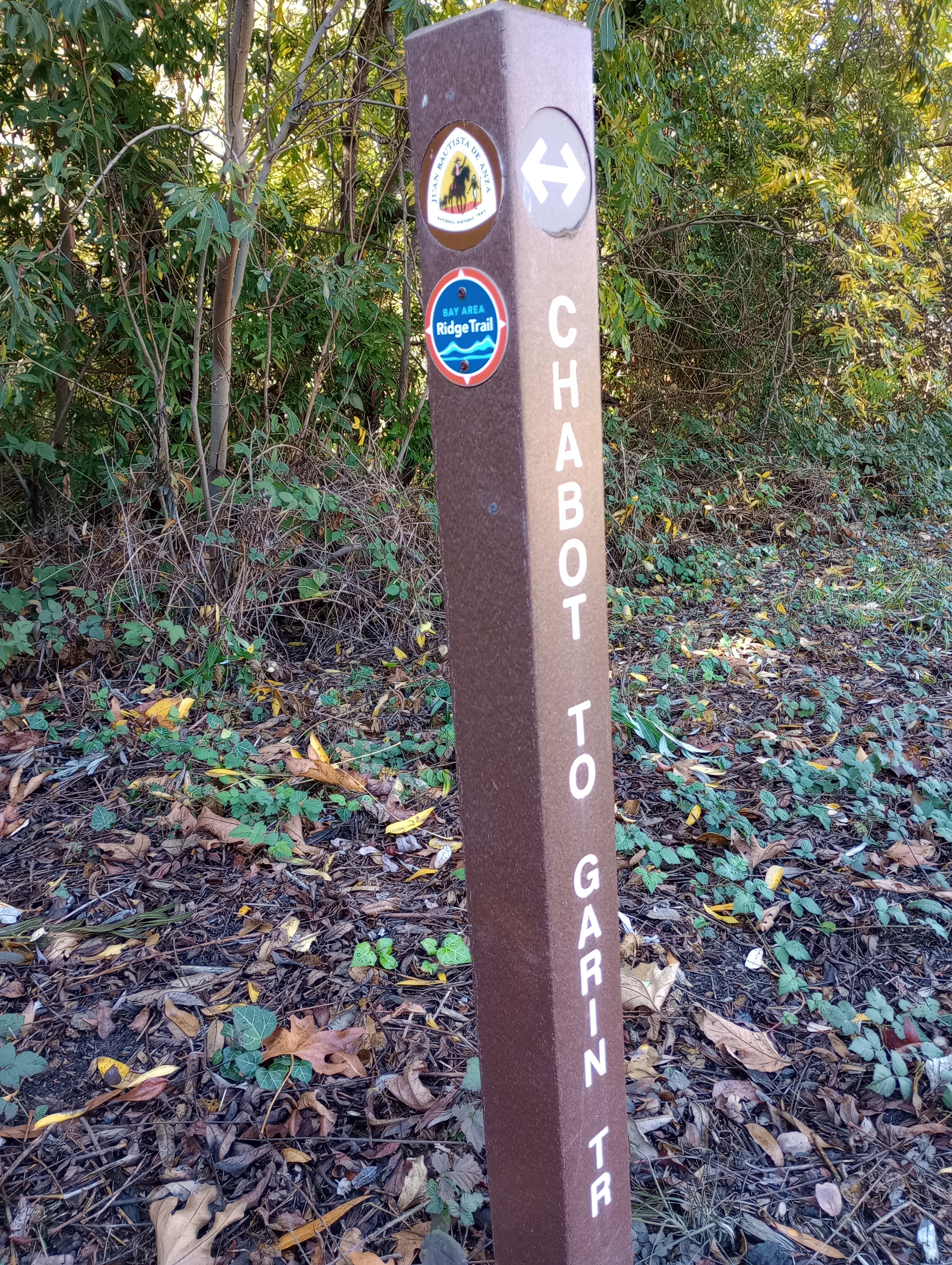
A marker of the Chabot-to-Garin Regional Trail and the simultaneous Bay Area Ridge Trail at Cull Canyon. A part the hiking version of the Juan Bautista de Anza National Historic Trail is here.
