= Saint Thomas Yuma Indian Mission =

Catholic mission in Winterhaven, California

Coordinates: 32.73080°N 114.61534°W

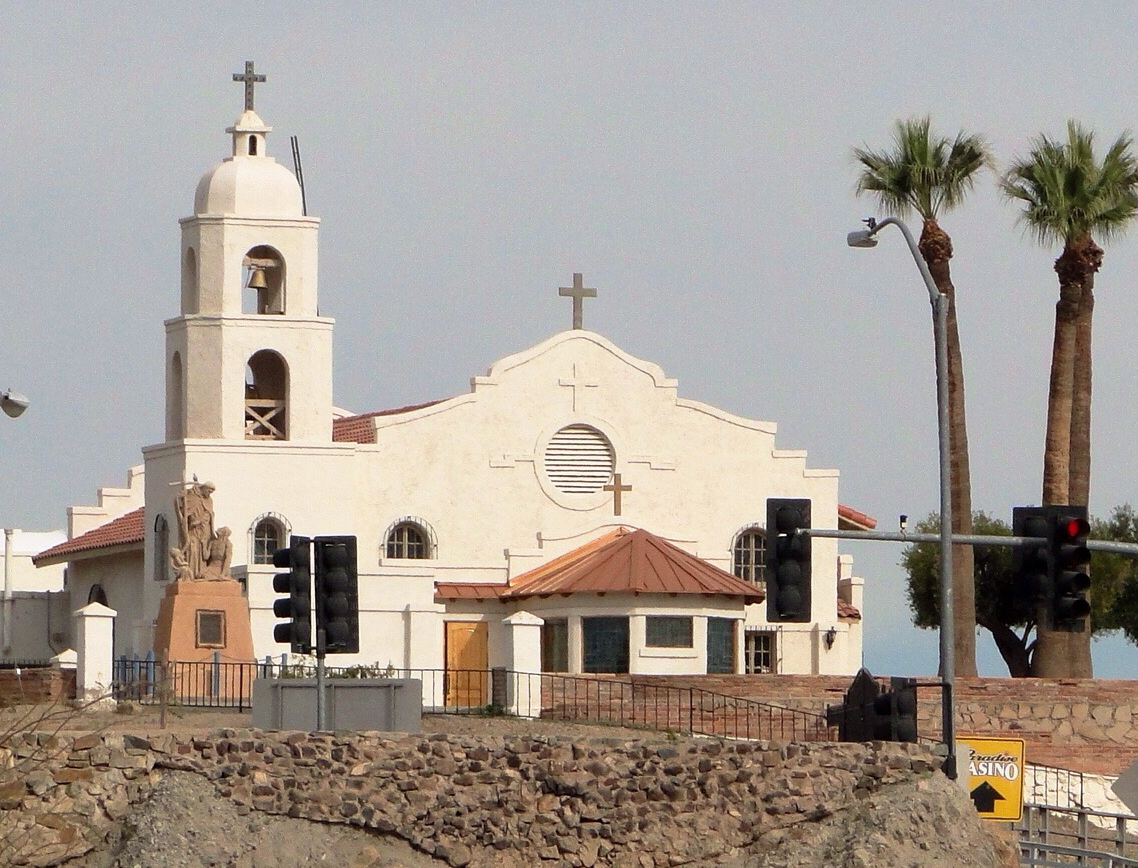

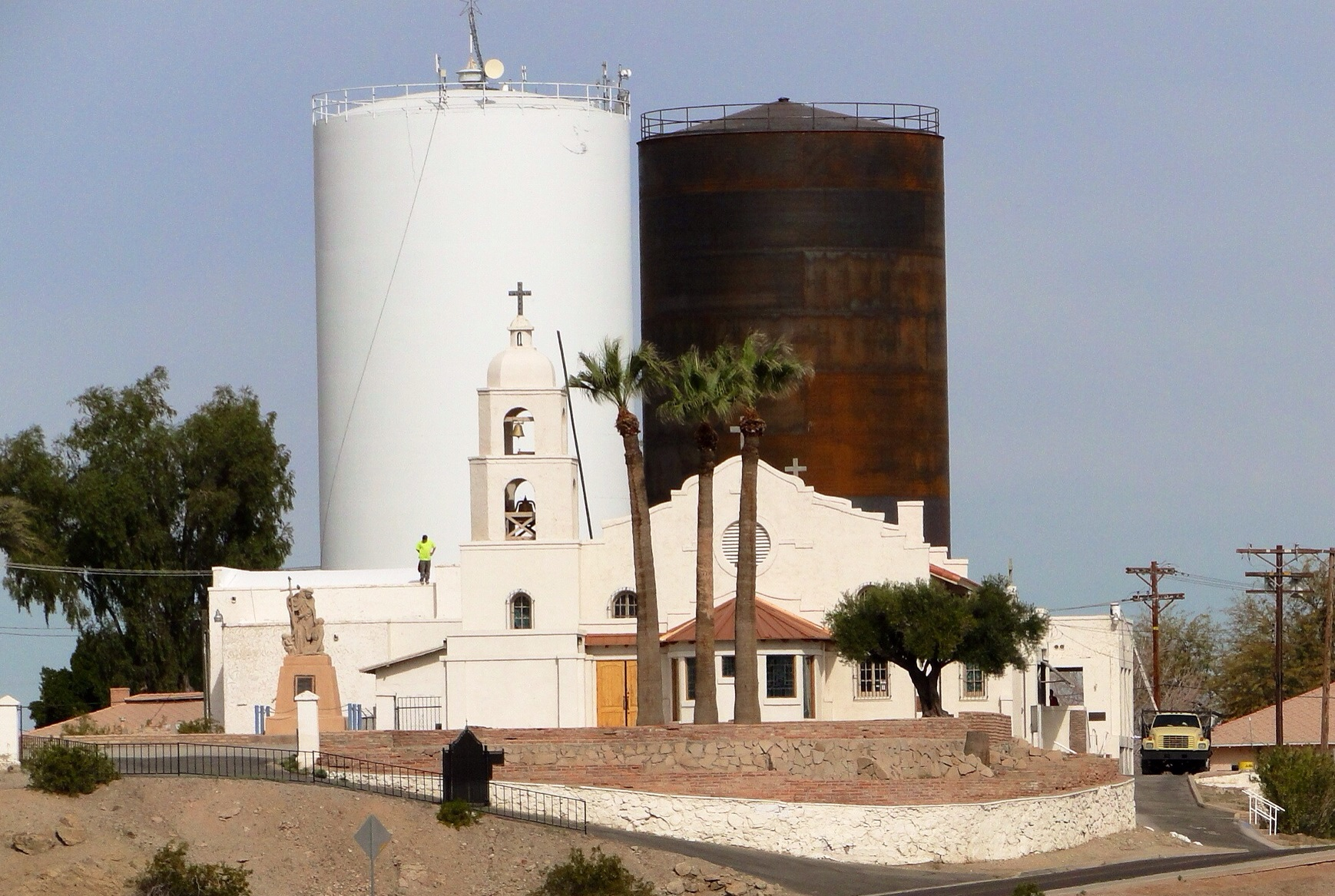

The Saint Thomas Indian Mission is a Catholic mission in Winterhaven, California. It was dedicated in 1923, and its design replicates the Mission Puerto de Purísima Concepción, which once stood on the site.

== History ==
Construction began on the Purísima Concepción Mission in the fall of 1780 by Fathers Juan Antonio Barreneche and Francis Tomás Hermenogildo Garcés. Poorly defended, the mission was destroyed the following year, during a raid and massacre over the period of July 17–19, 1781 by Quechans (Yuma), frustrated by their treatment at the hands of the Spanish colonists. The raid left fathers Garcés and Barreneche dead, beaten to death with clubs, over 100 Spanish settlers killed, and 74 more were held as prisoners until Governor Pedro Fages paid a ransom for their release in 1782.

The site is California Registered Historic Landmark #350, and a plaque on the site and statue of father Garcés commemorates the site of the ill-fated mission.

The mission was one of two in the area; the other being the Mission San Pedro y San Pablo de Bicuner, eight miles away, along the river.

The site of the mission was later part of Fort Yuma.

== See also ==
- Fort Yuma
- Spanish missions in California
