= Mission San Pedro y San Pablo de Bicuñer =

Former 18th-century Spanish mission in California

- Location: Imperial County, California, near Yuma, Arizona
- Coordinates: 32°48′59″N 114°30′54″W
- Name as founded: La Misión de San Pedro y San Pablo de Bicuñer
- English translation: The Mission of Saint Peter and Saint Paul of Bicuñer
- Patron: The Apostles Saint Peter and Saint Paul
- Founded: January 7, 1781
- Founded by: Father Francisco Garcés
- Founding Order: Franciscan
- Native tribe: Quechan; Yuma
- Current use: Nonextant

California Historical Landmark
- Reference no.: #921

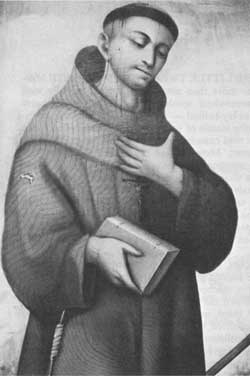
Francisco Garcés in 1775

Mission San Pedro y San Pablo de Bicuñer was founded on January 7, 1781, by the Spanish Franciscan friar Francisco Garcés, to protect the Anza Trail where it forded the Colorado River, between the Mexican provinces of Alta California and New Navarre.

The settlement, located about 10 miles (16 km) northeast of Yuma Crossing in present-day California, was not part of the Spanish California missions chain, but was administered as a part of the Arizona missions chain.

== History ==
The Mission site and nearby pueblo were inadequately supported, and Spanish colonists seized the best lands, destroyed the Indians' crops, and generally ignored the rights of the local natives.

In retaliation, the Quechans (Yuma) and their allies attacked and destroyed the installation and the neighboring Mission Puerto de Purísima Concepción during a three-day period, from July 17–19, 1781. Some 50 Spaniards, including Father Garcés (along with three other friars and Captain Fernando Rivera y Moncada) were killed, and the women and children taken captive. The Indians' victory closed this crossing and seriously crippled future communications between Las Californias province and colonial Mexico, both within the Viceroyalty of New Spain.

Today, only a California Historical Marker identifies the site. The marker is located on Imperial County Road S24, 0.2 mi W of the intersection of Levee Road and Mehring Road/11th St, and 4.4 mi NE of Bard, in southeastern Imperial County.

== California Historical Landmark ==
California Historical Landmark number 921 reads:

NO. 921 SITE OF MISSION SAN PEDRO Y SAN PABLO DE BICUNER – To protect the Anza Trail where it forded the Colorado River, the Spanish founded a pueblo and mission nearby on January 7, 1781. Threatened with the loss of their land, the Quechans (Yumas) attacked this strategic settlement on July 17, 1781. The Quechan victory closed this crossing and seriously crippled future communications between upper California and Mexico.

== See also ==
- Spanish missions in Arizona
- Spanish missions in California
- California Historical Landmarks in Imperial County
- Spanish missions in the Sonoran Desert
- Spanish missions in Baja California
- California Historical Landmark
