= Alonso Ignacio Benito Espinosa =

Spanish Jesuit missionary (1720–1786)

Alonso Ignacio Benito Espinosa (1720–1786) was a Spanish Jesuit missionary to New Spain.

== Biography ==
Espinosa was born on February 1, 1720, in Las Palmas, Gran Canaria. He was ordained at age twenty-one in Mérida, Yucatán, and subsequently moved to Michoacán. After recovering from a serious illness during a visit to Guanajuato, Espinosa entered the Society of Jesus on August 14, 1750. He completed his novitiate on August 15, 1752, and was assigned to the Spanish missions in the Sonoran Desert.

In May 1754, Espinosa was assigned to Mission La Purísima Concepción de Nuestra Señora de Caborca. He traveled there together with Governor Pablo de Arce y Arroyo and Father Visitor Carlos de Roxas, but returned to San Ignacio due both to his poor health and to unrest among the Caborca natives. In June, the provincial superior, Joseph de Utrera, reassigned Espinosa to Mission San Xavier del Bac. The residence there was not yet complete, so Espinosa relocated temporarily to the nearby Mission Los Santos Ángeles de Guevavi.

Early in 1756, Espinosa moved into the mission in Bac, where he attempted to suppress native rituals involving ceremonial dance and intoxication. This provoked unrest among the natives, and that October, native leader Jabanimó led an uprising at the mission. Espinosa escaped to Presidio San Ignacio de Tubac, and Lieutenant Juan María de Oliva led a force of 15 soldiers to Bac and put down the rebellion. Subsequently, Governor Juan Antonio de Mendoza and Captain Francisco Elías Gonzalez led a punitive expedition, which reinstalled Espinosa at Bac and fought Jabanimó by the Gila River.

Espinosa continued to have poor success at San Xavier del Bac. In the winter of 1760, he reported that nearly all the natives had abandoned the mission. There was insufficient water, and the livestock suffered from Apache raids. About 1763, construction was finished on the new church which had been underway since 1756. Espinosa's health was poor, and he spent the winter of 1764 in San Ignacio under the care of Francisco Xavier Pauer. He returned to Bac, but by spring he was bedbound with an infected leg. In the summer of 1765, the provincial superior, Manuel Aguirre, assigned José Neve to replace Espinosa at Bac. Espinosa was too sick to be moved, and spent another year assisting Neve after recovering, but eventually he went on to serve at Mission Los Siete Príncipes del Átil.

At the time of the 1767 Jesuit Expulsion, he was once again in Caborca. Along with about fifty other Jesuits, Espinosa was escorted to a church in Mátape, near Hermosillo. From there, the soldiers took them to Guaymas, across the Gulf of Mexico, through Tepic, and to Guadalajara. Many of the Jesuits died on the way, but a few, including Espinosa, survived to reach Cádiz in Spain. Espinosa went on to spend the last seventeen years of his life in the Monastery of Yuste, and died on September 21, 1786.
