= Mission San Xavier del Bac =

17th-century Spanish mission in Arizona

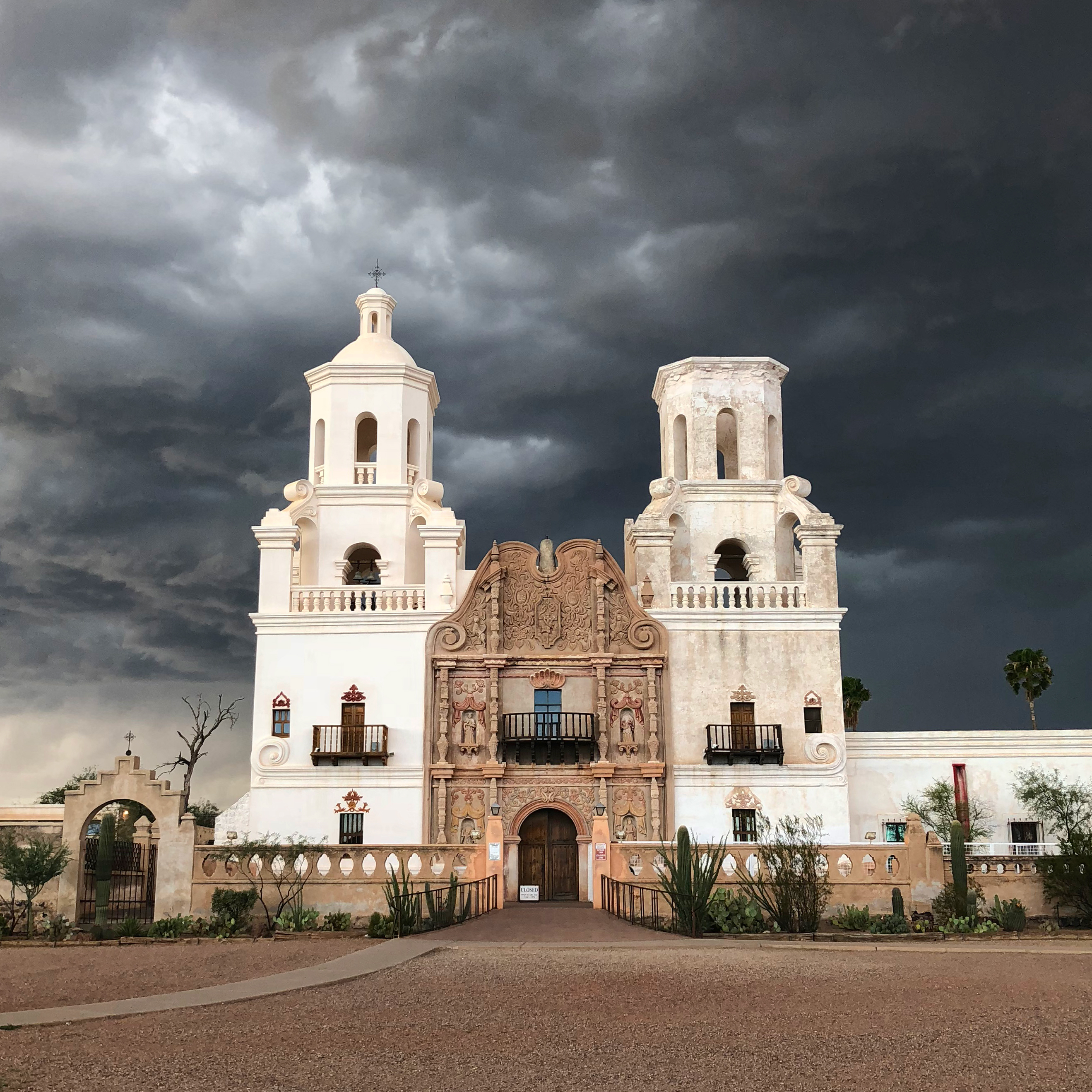
- San Xavier del Bac

- Location within Arizona Location within the United States
- Location: near Tucson, Arizona
- Coordinates: 32.107°N 111.008°W
- Name as founded: La Misión San Xavier del Bac
- English translation: The Mission of Saint Xavier of the Water
- Patron: Saint Francis Xavier, SJ
- Nickname: "The White Dove of the Desert"
- Founded: 1692 (current structure dates to 1783–1797)
- Founded by: Father Eusebio Francisco Kino, SJ
- Native tribe: Tohono O'odhamans Yaqui
- Governing body: San Xavier Indian Reservation
- Current use: Parish Church

U.S. National Register of Historic Places
- Designated: October 15, 1966
- Reference no.: 66000191

U.S. National Historic Landmark
- Designated: October 9, 1960

Mission San Xavier del Bac (Spanish: La Misión de San Xavier del Bac) is a historic Spanish Catholic mission about 10 miles (16 km) south of downtown Tucson, Arizona, on the Tohono O'odham Nation San Xavier Indian Reservation. The mission was founded in 1692 by Eusebio Kino in the center of a centuries-old settlement of the Sobaipuri O'odham, a branch of the Akimel or River O'odham located along the banks of the Santa Cruz River. The mission was named for Francis Xavier, co-founder of the Jesuit Order in Europe. The original church was built to the north of the later Franciscan church and was demolished during an Apache raid in 1770.

The mission was rebuilt between 1783 and 1797, which makes it the oldest European structure in Arizona. Labor was provided by the O'odham. An outstanding example of Spanish Colonial architecture in the United States, the Mission San Xavier del Bac hosts some 200,000 visitors each year. It is a well-known pilgrimage site, with thousands visiting each year on foot and on horseback, some among ceremonial cavalcades or cabalgatas.

The site is also known as "Wa:k" in the O'odham language (O'odham: Wa:k ("Water Place") referring to its surface water and springs, which no longer flow. The water in the Santa Cruz River came up to the surface a few miles south of Martinez Hill and then submerged again near Los Reales Wash. The Santa Cruz River used to run year-round in this section and was once critical to the community's survival, but now runs only part of the year.

== History ==
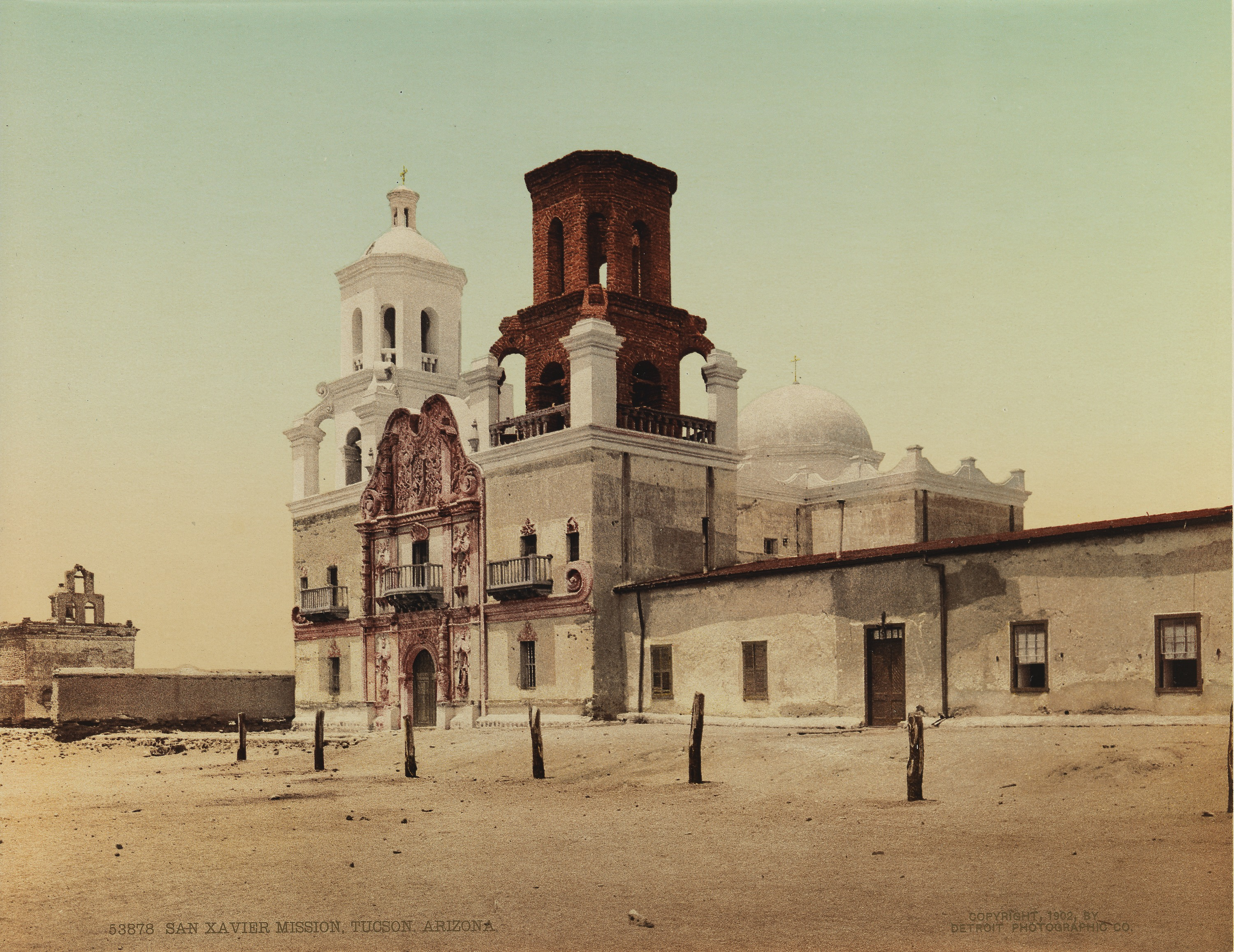
San Xavier Mission, 1902

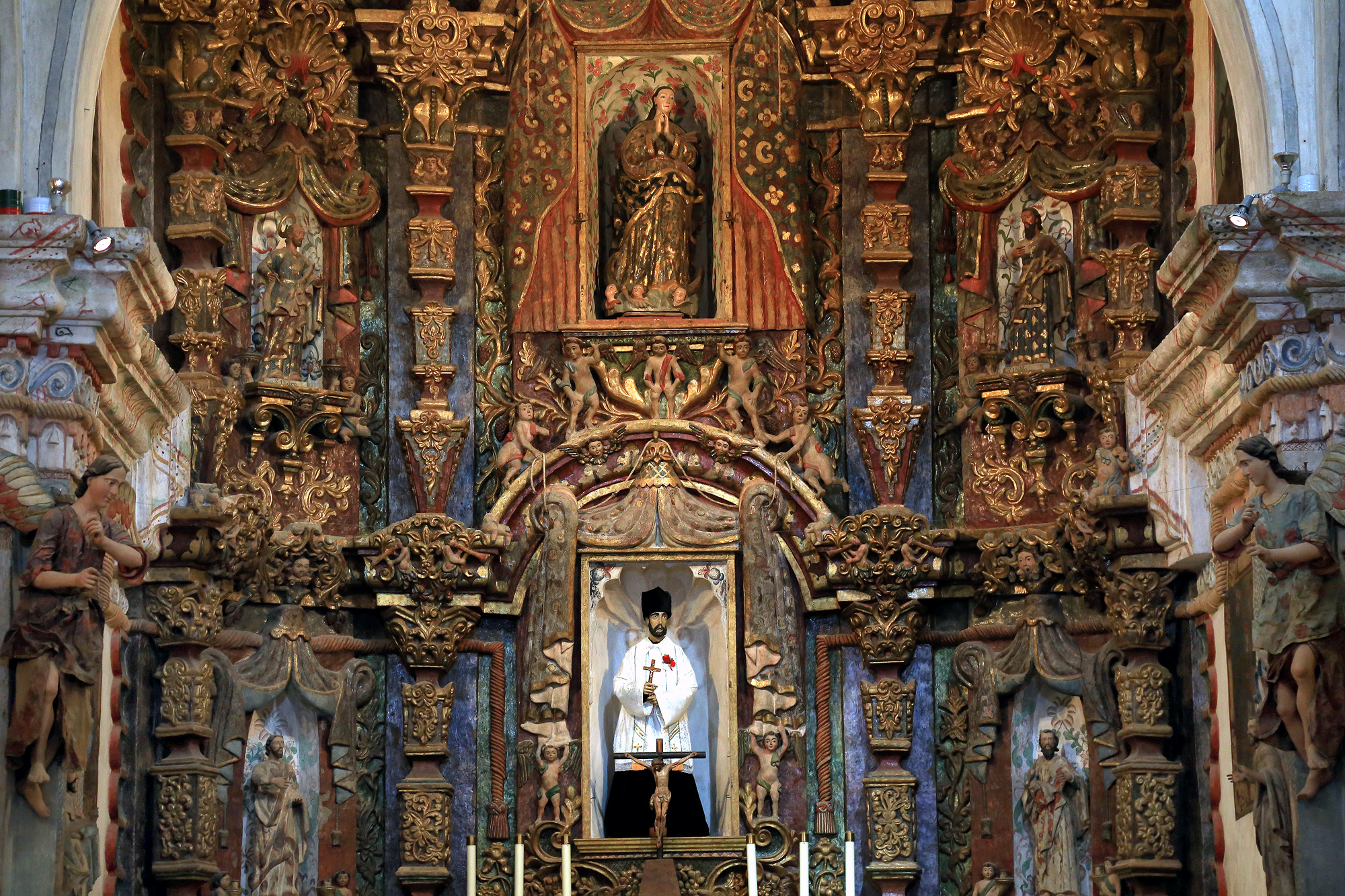
Mission San Xavier Chapel, Main Altar

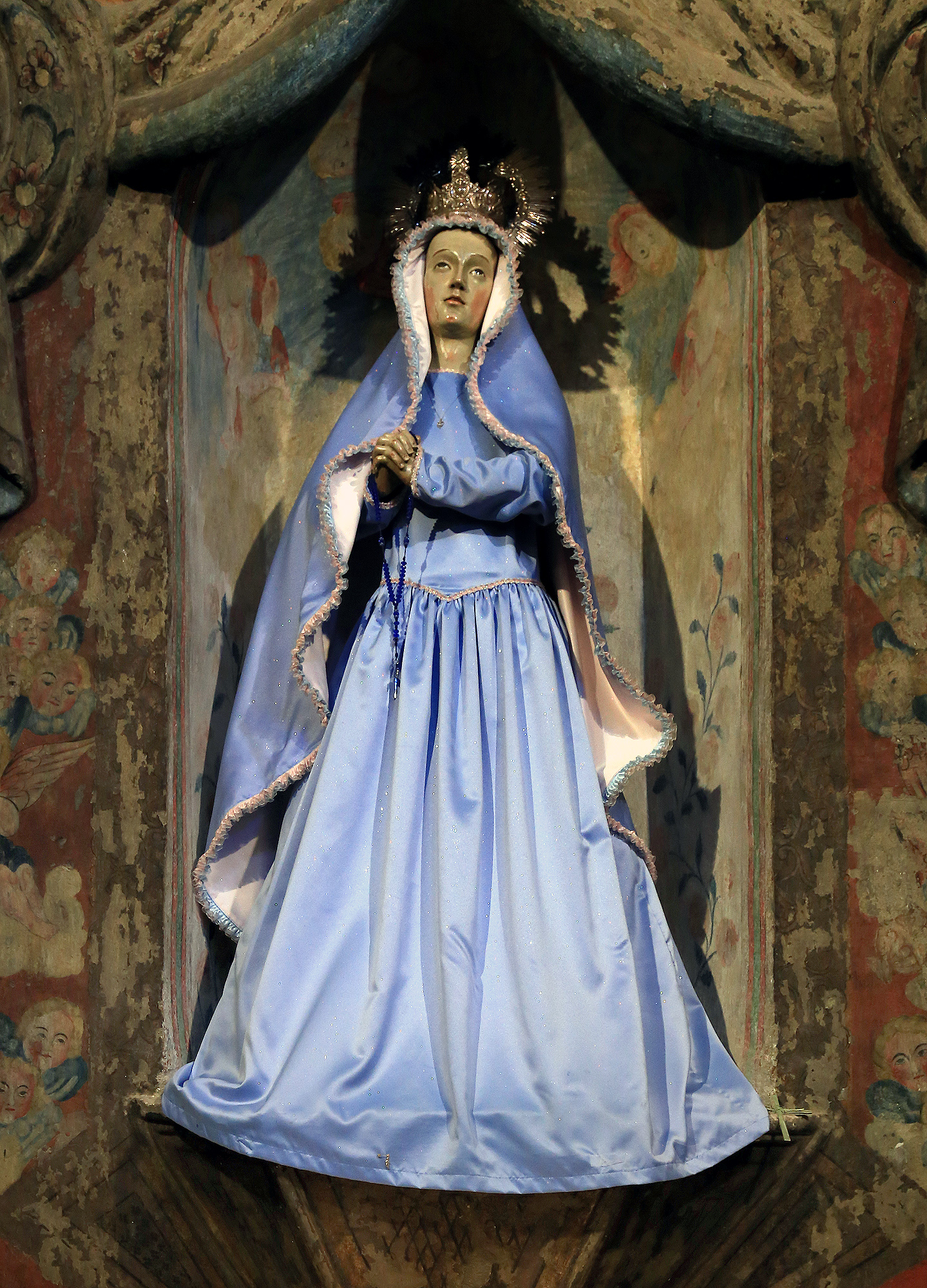
Statuary, Mission San Xavier Chapel

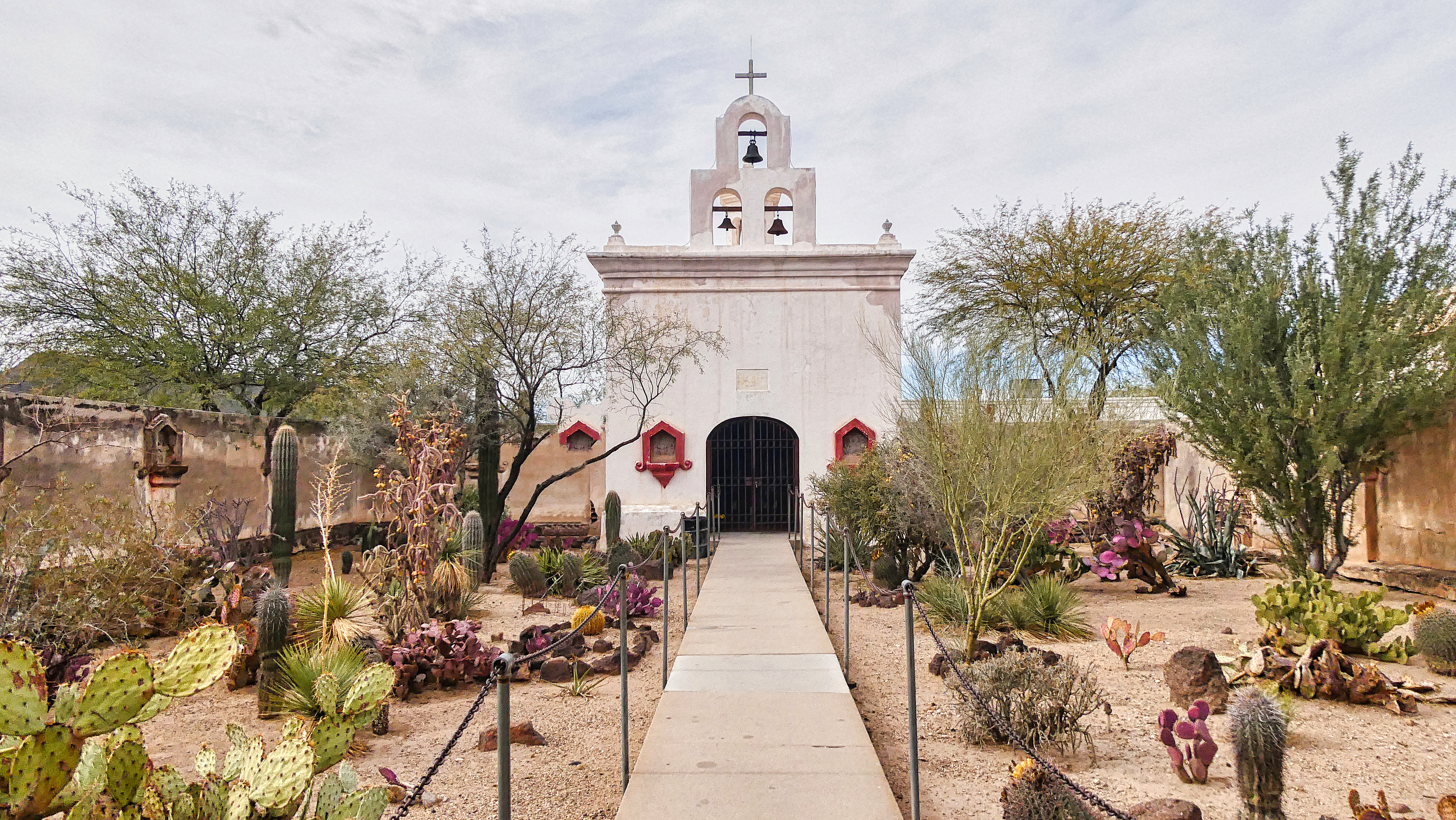
Mission garden

Mission San Xavier del Bac was established in 1692 by Eusebio Francisco Kino, who founded a chain of Spanish missions in the Sonoran Desert. A Jesuit of Italian descent, Kino often visited and preached in the area, then the Pimería Alta colonial territory of the Viceroyalty of New Spain. Construction of the first mission church, about 2 miles (3 km) from the site of today's mission, began on April 28, 1700, as noted in his diary:

On the twenty-eighth we began the foundations of a very large and capacious church and house of San Xavier del Bac, all of the many people working with much pleasure and zeal, some in digging for the foundations, others in hauling many and very good stones of tezontle from a little hill which was about a quarter of a league away. ... On the twenty-ninth we continued laying the foundations of the church and of the house.

The "little hill" is believed to be that southeast of San Xavier del Bac. The location was vulnerable to Apache raids, and construction was interrupted until 1756, when it resumed under Alonso Ignacio Benito Espinosa. By 1763 the building was sufficiently complete that the missionaries could hold services inside it, although a poorly prepared foundation led to architectural issues.

In 1767, Charles III of Spain banned Jesuits from Spanish lands in the Americas; he installed Franciscans, whom he considered more pliable and "reliable", as replacements. Francisco Garcés was assigned to San Xavier del Bac, where he remained until 1778. By 1770, the continuing Apache raids finally destroyed the original church. From 1775 on, the mission community and its Indigenous converts were protected somewhat from Apache raids by the Presidio San Agustín del Tucsón, established roughly 7 miles (11 km) downstream on the Santa Cruz River.

The present mission building was constructed under the direction of Franciscan fathers Juan Bautista Velderrain and Juan Bautista Llorenz between 1783 and 1797. With 7,000 pesos borrowed from a Sonoran rancher, they hired architect Ignacio Gaona, who employed a large workforce of O'odham to create today's church.

Following Mexican independence in 1821, what was then known as Alta California was administered from Mexico City. In 1822, the mission was included under the jurisdiction of the Catholic Diocese of Sonora. In 1828, the Mexican government banned all Spanish-born priests, with the last resident Franciscan departing San Xavier for Spain in 1837.

Left vacant, the mission began to decay. Concerned about their church, local O'odham began to preserve what they could. In 1852, John Russell Bartlett visited the mission, writing:

[The mission is] truly a miserable place, consisting of from eighty to one hundred huts, or wigwams, made of mud or straw, the sole occupants of which are Pimo Indians, though generally called Papagos. In the midst of these hovels stands the largest and most beautiful church in the State of Sonora.

With the Gadsden Purchase in 1853, the site of San Xavier became a part of the United States and the new Territory of Arizona. The church was re-opened in 1859 when the Santa Fe Diocese added the mission to its jurisdiction. It ordered repairs paid for with diocesan money, and assigned a priest to serve the community. In 1868 the Diocese of Tucson was established. It provided for regular services to be held again at the church.

In 1872, the Sisters of St. Joseph of Carondelet opened a school at the mission for the Tohono O'odham children. In 1895, a grant of $1,000 was given to repair the building. More classrooms were added in 1900. The Franciscans returned to the mission in 1913. In 1947, they built a new school next to the church for the local children.

== Missionaries ==
Like most missions in New Spain, San Xavier was staffed by Jesuits until their 1767 expulsion from Mexico; afterwards, they were replaced by Franciscans.

- 1754–1766: Alonso Ignacio Benito Espinosa
- 1766–1767: José Neve
- 1768–1778: Francisco Garcés
- 1778–1790: Juan Bautista Velderrain
- 1790–1797: Juan Bautista Llorenz
- 1797–1820: Pedro Antonio de Arriquibar
- 1820–1824: Juan Vañó
- 1824–1827: Rafael Diaz

== Renovation ==
Extensive restoration began in 1992 and was continuing as of 2021.

In 2024, a project to preserve the mission's tan plaster exterior received a $749,000 grant from the Historic Preservation Fund of the National Park Service.

== Architecture ==
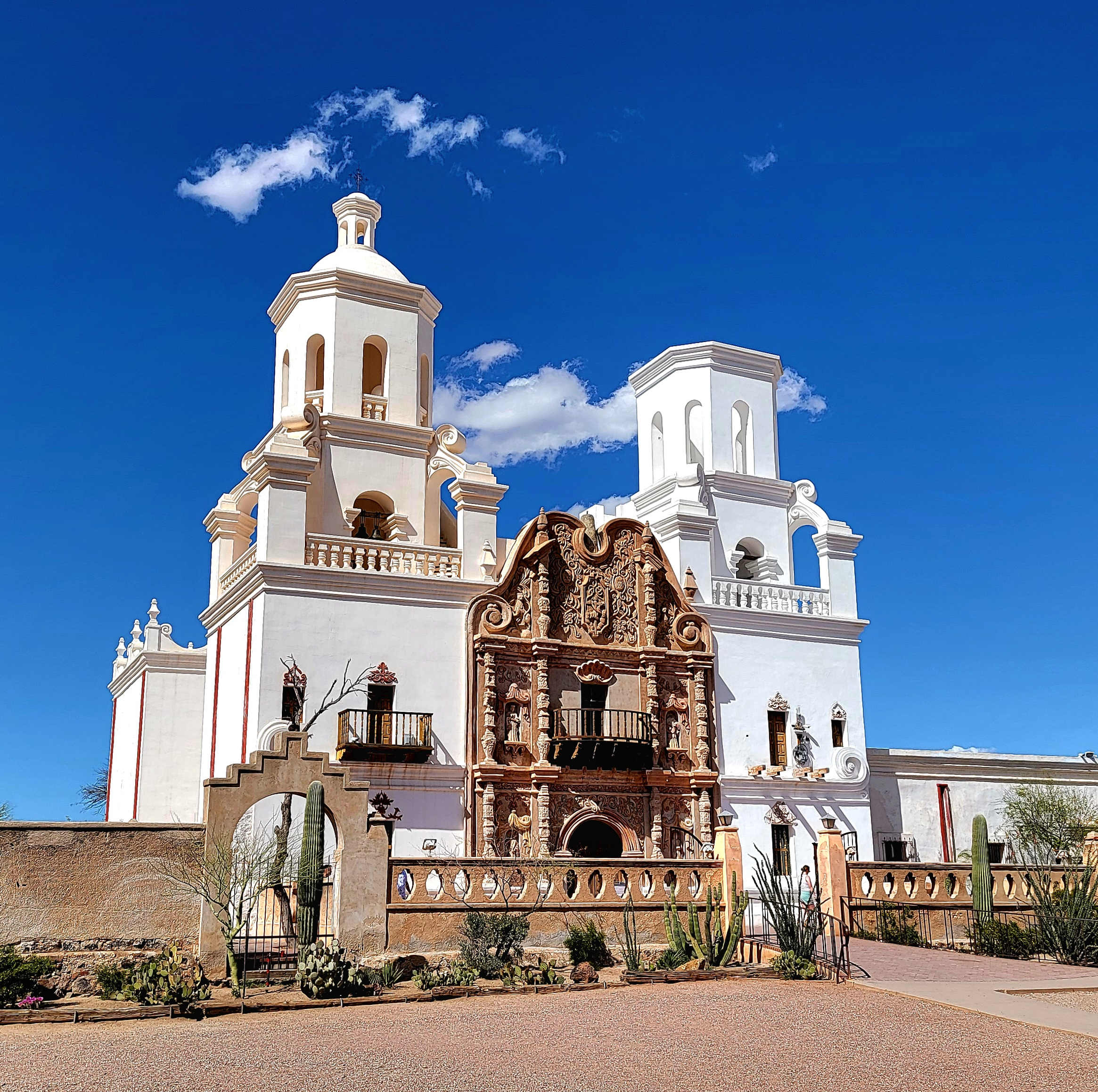
Mission San Xavier del Bac in 2024

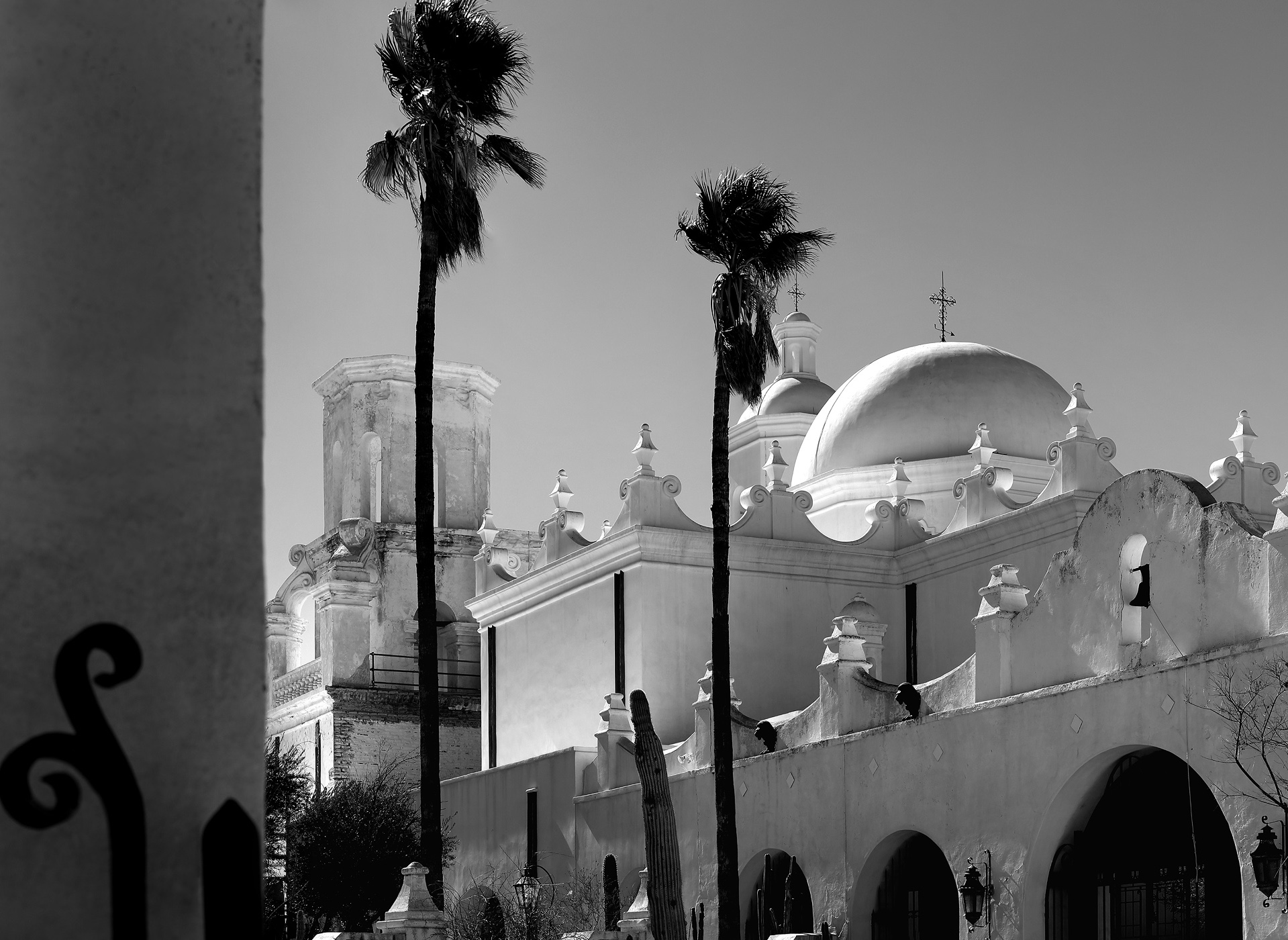
The North Court at Mission San Xavier del Bac, Tucson, Arizona

San Xavier has an elegant white stucco, Moorish-inspired exterior, with an ornately decorated entrance. Visitors entering the massive, carved mesquite-wood doors are often struck both by the coolness of the interior and the dazzling colors of the paintings, carvings, frescoes, and statues. The architecture is entirely European, with no Piman influence on its Baroque style.

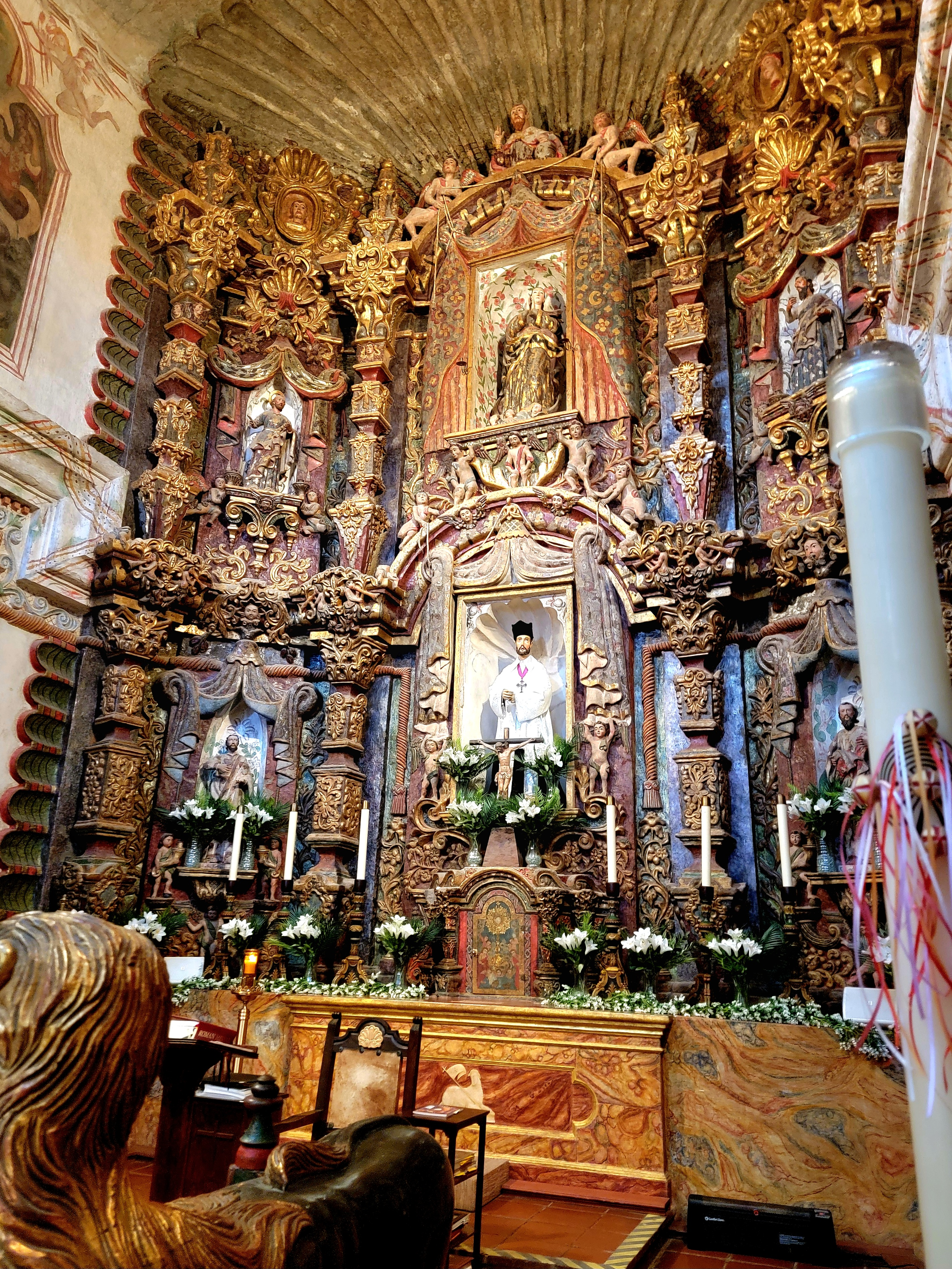
Interior view of Mission San Xavier del Bac in 2024

The floor plan of the church resembles the classic Latin cross, with a main aisle separated from the sanctuary by the transept, which has chapels at either end. The dome above the transept is 52 feet (16 m) high, supported by arches and squinches. At least three different artists painted the artwork inside the church. It is considered by many to be the finest example of Spanish mission architecture in the United States.

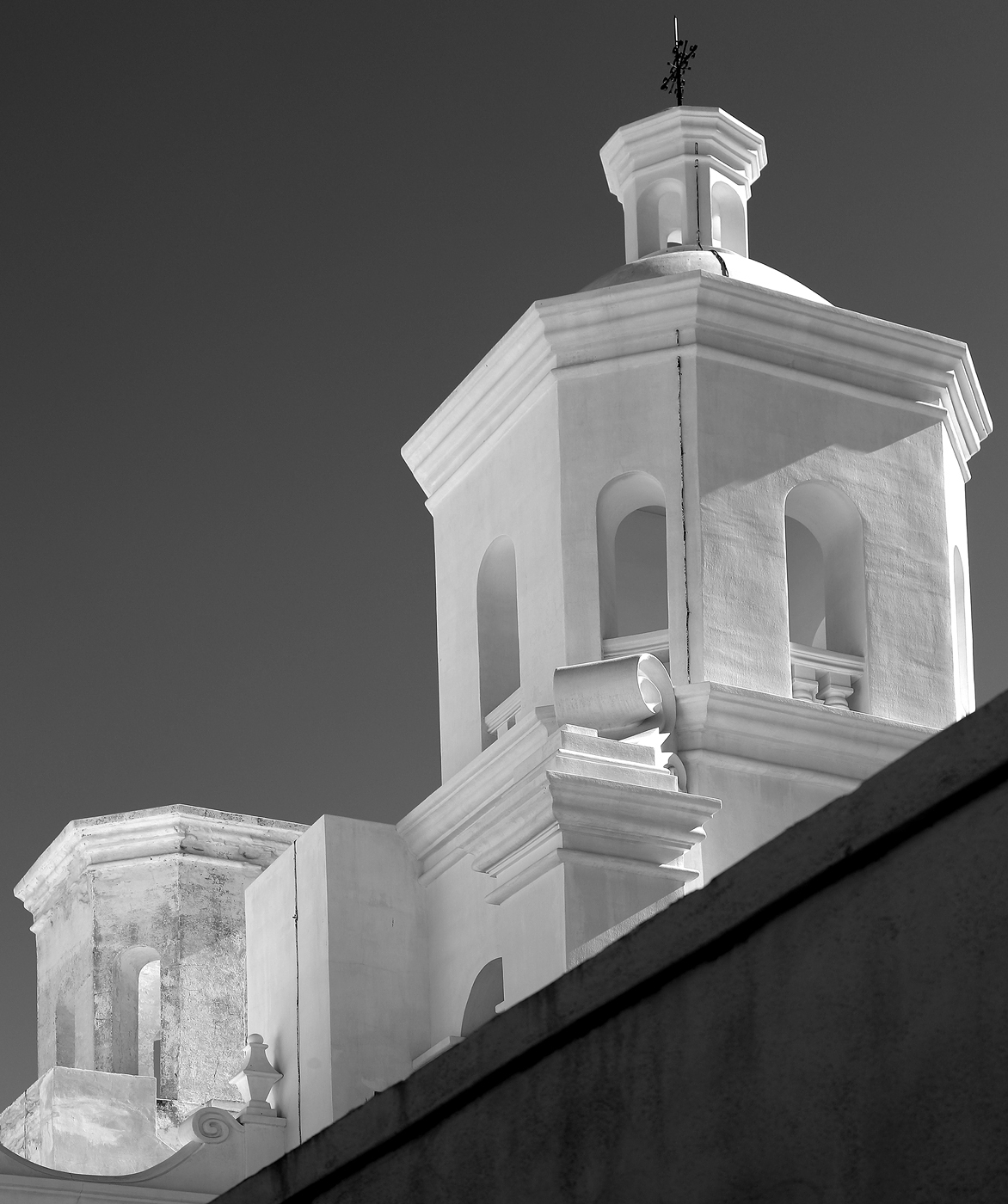
Mission San Xavier del Bac, Towers by Philip G Coman, 2018

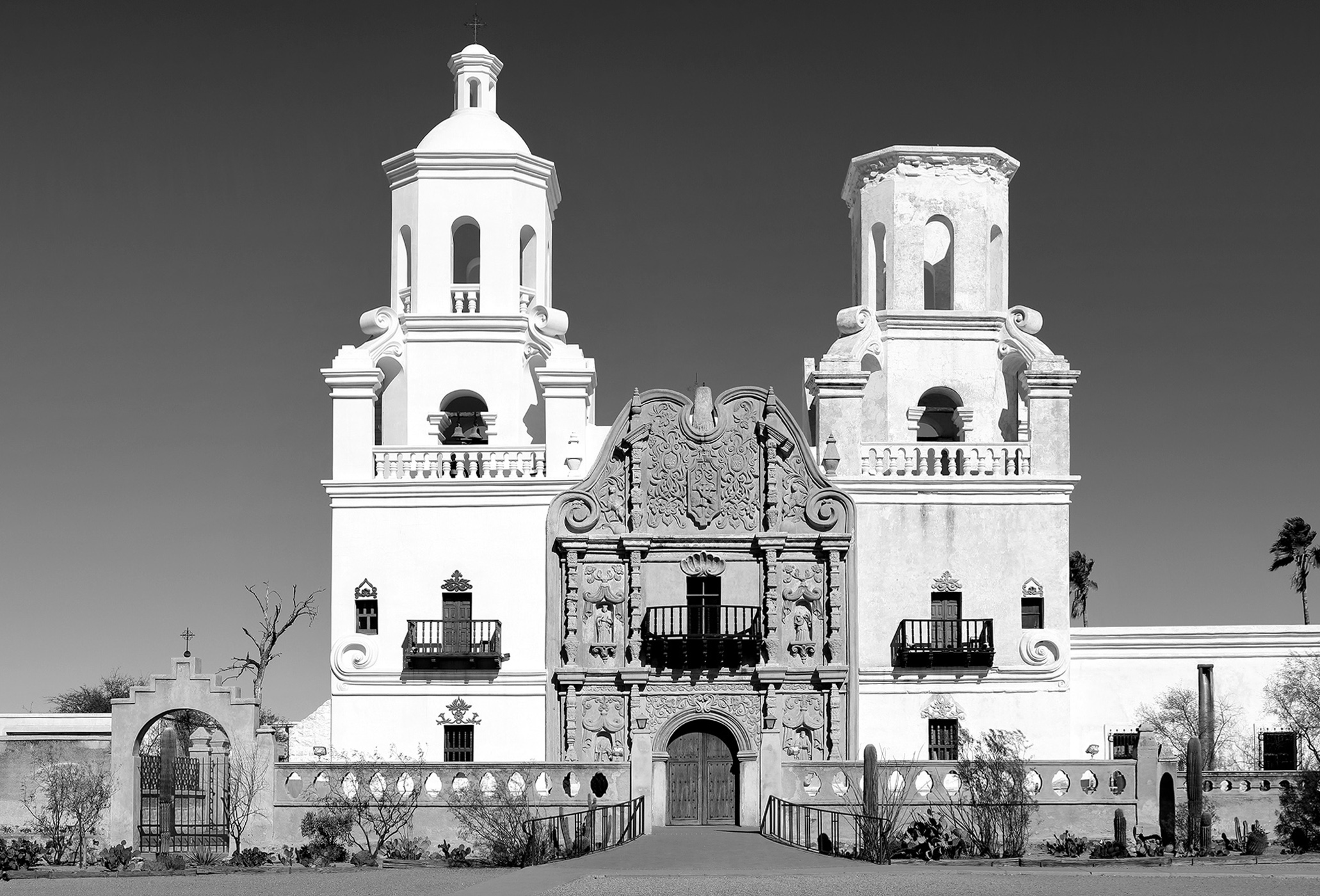
Mission San Xavier del Bac, Tucson, Arizona

== 21st century ==
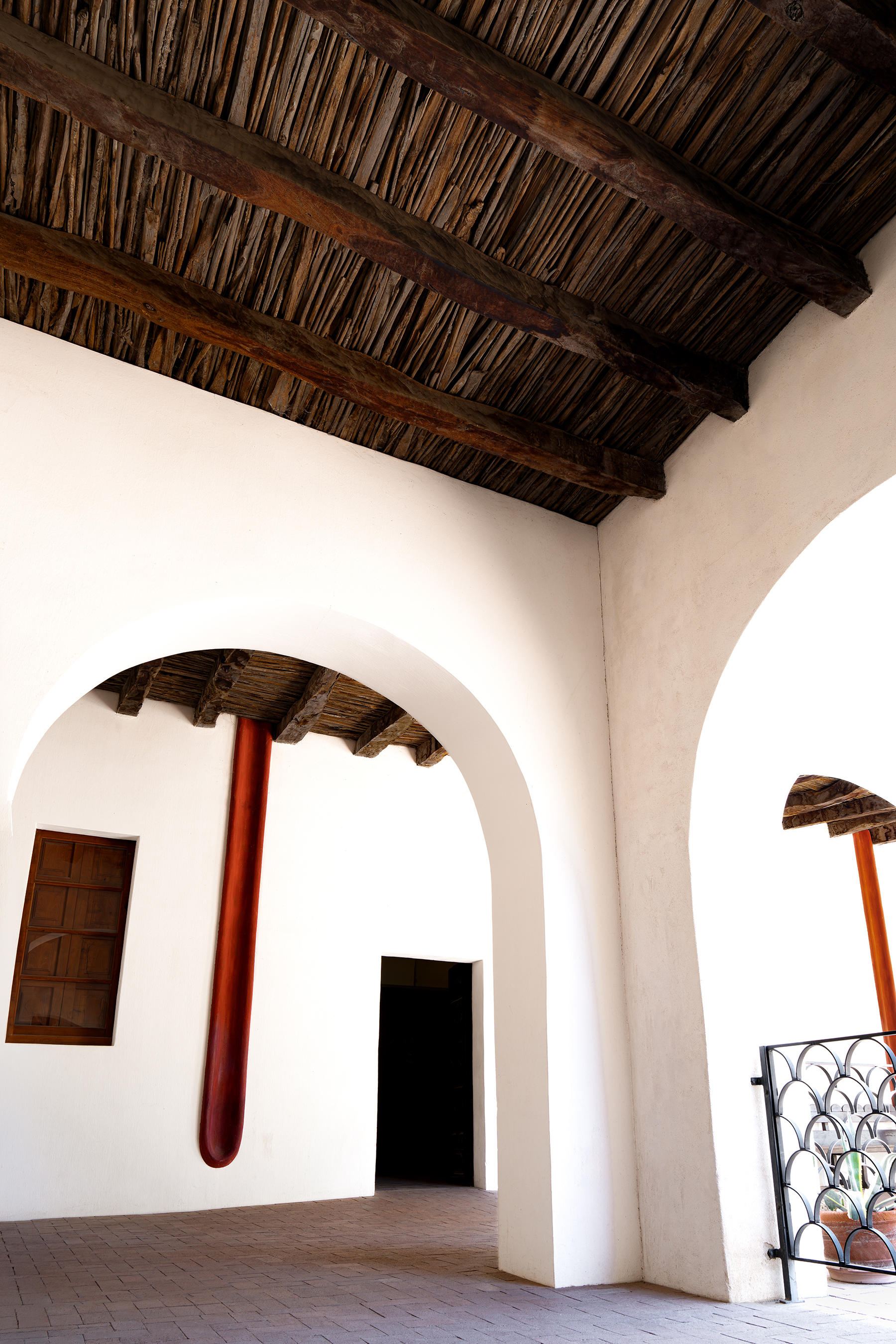
Courtyard in Mission San Xavier del Bac. Traditional Pueblo and Spanish colonial ceiling construction (vigas and latillas)

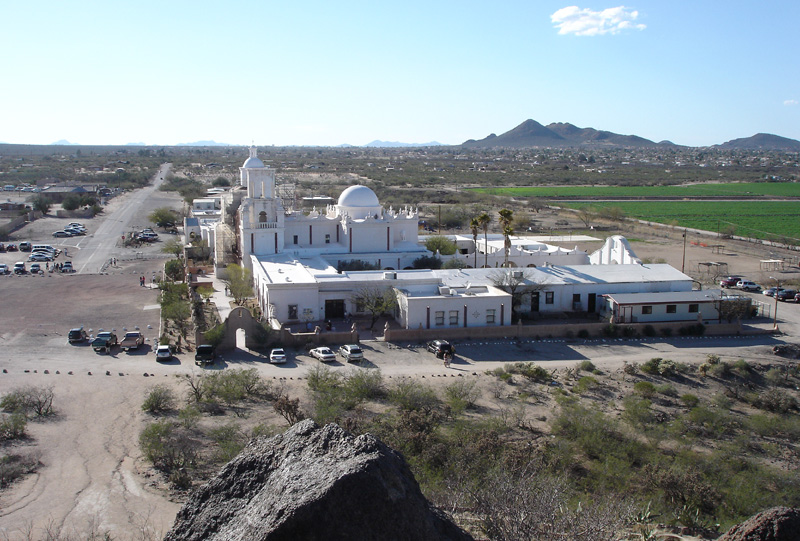
The mission as seen from the hill east of the complex

Unlike the other Spanish missions in Arizona, San Xavier is still actively run by Franciscans, and continues to serve the native community by which it was built. Widely considered to be the finest example of Spanish Colonial architecture in the United States, the Mission hosts some 200,000 visitors each year. It is open to the public daily, except when being used for church services. The Franciscan Sisters of Christian Charity, who have taught at the school since 1872, continue with their work and reside in the mission convent. It has a mausoleum which is open for visiting. The mission makes a cameo appearance in Willa Cather's 1927 novel Death Comes for the Archbishop when it is described by Vaillant as "the most beautiful church on the continent, though it had been neglected for more than two hundred years."

Mission San Xavier del Bac was declared a National Historic Landmark in 1960 and was listed on the National Register of Historic Places in 1966. The San Xavier Festival is held the evening of the Friday after Easter and features a torch-light parade of Tohono O'odham and Yaqui tribal members.

== In popular culture ==
The exterior of the Mission was used in the 1979 TV mini-series Salem's Lot, as an establishing shot taken for a fictitious church in Guatemala.

== See also ==
- Spanish missions in Arizona
- Spanish Missions in the Sonoran Desert
- Architecture of the California missions
- List of Jesuit sites
- List of the oldest churches in the United States
- List of the oldest buildings in Arizona
- 18th-century Western domes
