= Francisco Garcés =

Explorer, missionary (1738–1781)

Francisco Garcés O.F.M.
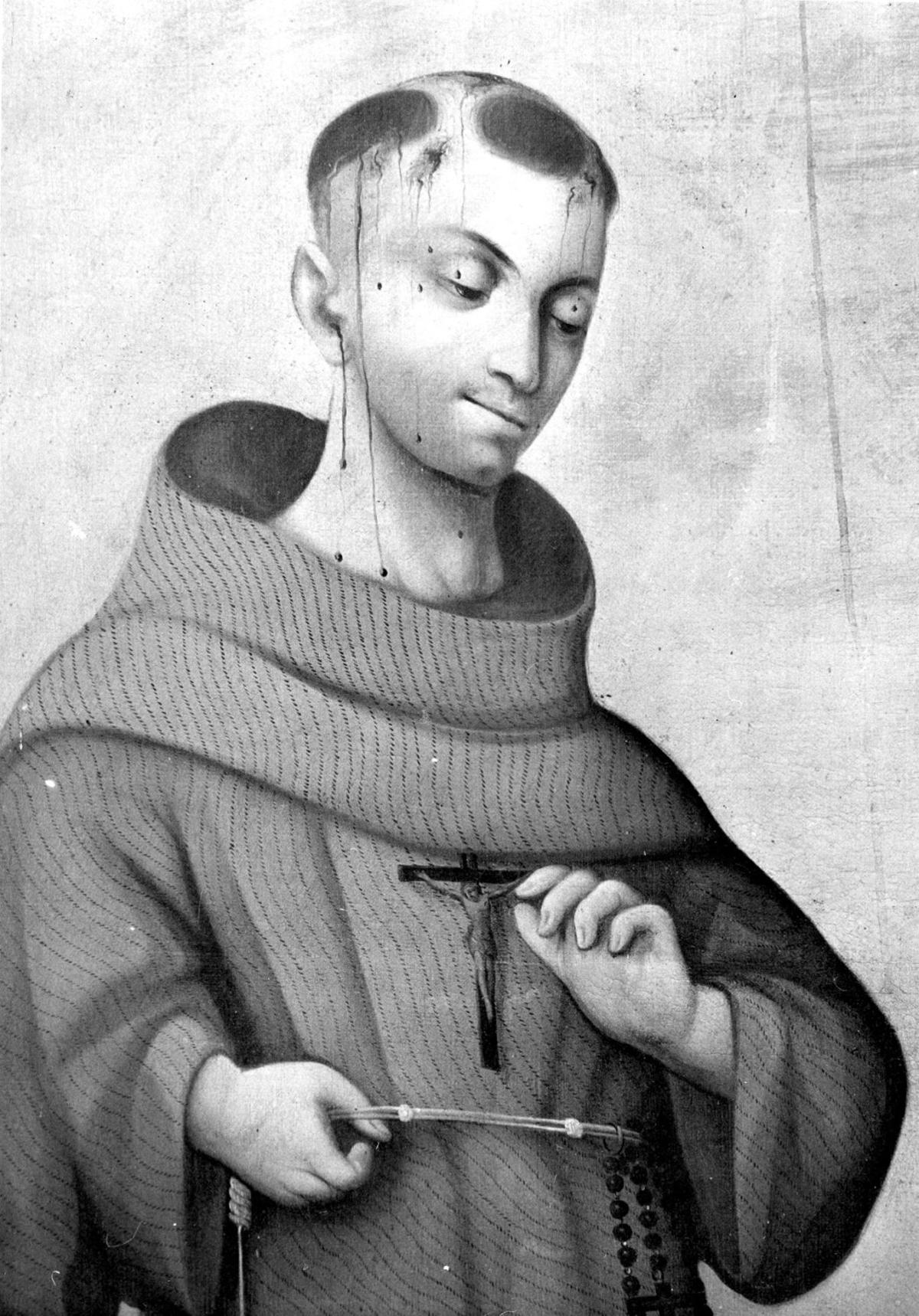
- Born: April 12, 1738; Morata de Jalón, Zaragoza, Spain
- Died: July 18, 1781 (aged 43); Mission Puerto de Purísima Concepción, New Navarre, New Spain (now Yuma, Arizona, U.S.)
- Occupations: Franciscan friar, priest and explorer

Francisco Hermenegildo Tomás Garcés O.F.M. (April 12, 1738 – July 18, 1781) was a Spanish Franciscan friar who served as a missionary and explorer in the colonial Viceroyalty of New Spain. He explored much of the southwestern region of North America, including present day Sonora and Baja California in Mexico, and the U.S. states of Arizona and California. He was killed along with his companion friars during an uprising by the Native American population, and they have been declared martyrs for the faith by the Catholic Church. The cause for his canonization was opened by the Church.

== History ==
Garcés was born April 12, 1738, in Morata de Jalón, Aragon, north-central Spain. He entered the Franciscan Order about 1758 and was ordained a priest in 1763 in Spain.

=== New Spain ===
Garcés travelled to New Spain (Mexico) and served at the Franciscan college of Santa Cruz in Querétaro. In 1768, when the King of Spain expelled the Jesuits from their extensive mission system in northwestern New Spain (within present-day Baja California, northwestern Mexico, and the southwestern United States), Garcés was among the Franciscan replacements. He was assigned to Mission San Xavier del Bac in the Sonoran Desert, near present-day Tucson, Arizona.

==== Missionary ====
The expulsion of the Jesuits by the Spanish King set in motion a sequence of dramatic events in the missions. The Franciscans from the college of Santa Cruz in Querétaro took over responsibility in the Sonoran Desert missions region in the present-day Mexican state of Sonora and the U.S. state of Arizona. Meanwhile, other Franciscans from the college of San Fernando in Mexico City under the leadership of Junípero Serra, were assigned to replace the Jesuits in the Baja California missions of the lower Las Californias Province.

==== Explorer ====
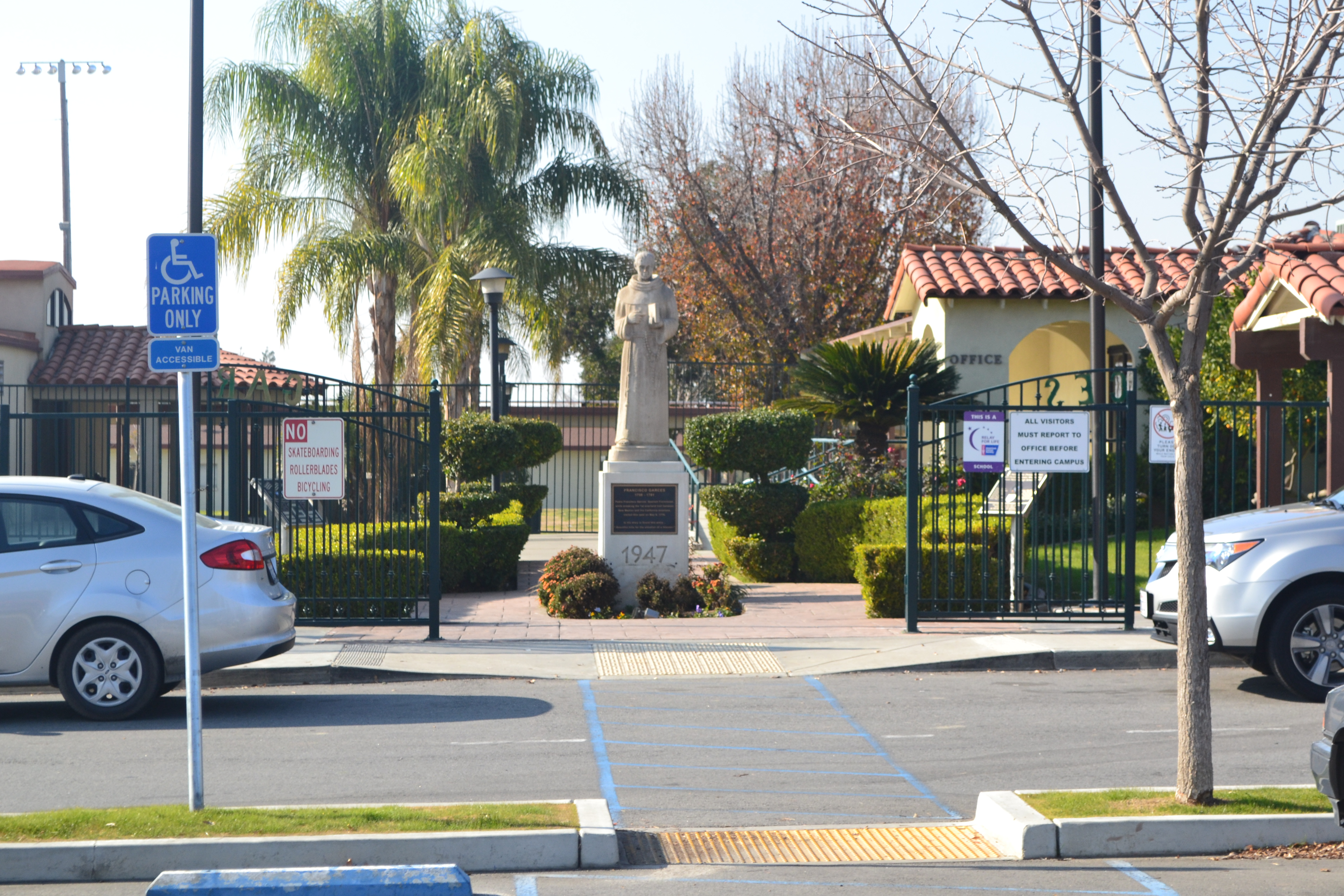
Garces Memorial High School in Bakersfield is named after Garcés.

Garcés became a key player in this effort, conducting extensive explorations in the Sonoran, Colorado, and Mojave Deserts, the Gila River, and the Colorado River from the Gulf of California and Lower Colorado River Valley to the Grand Canyon. He encountered and recorded accounts of the Native American tribes in their desert and riparian valley homelands, and established peaceable relations for the Crown, including with the Quechan, Mojave, Hopi, and Havasupai.

Many journeys were explorations on his own in the deserts. He accompanied soldier-explorer Juan Bautista de Anza part way in both his large overland expeditions: the 1774 De Anza Expedition - first to reach Alta California's Pacific coast from the east; and the 1775-76 Anza Colonizing Expedition, which traveled as far north as San Francisco Bay.

Garcés also crossed the Mojave Desert on the Mohave Trail and then the Old Tejon Pass and explored the southern San Joaquin Valley in 1776. The eastern part of the route Garcés took from the Colorado River across the Mojave Desert is known to four-wheel-drive adventurers today as the Mojave Road.

==== Death ====
In 1779–81, Garcés and Juan Díaz established two mission churches (Mission Puerto de Purísima Concepción and Mission San Pedro y San Pablo de Bicuñer) on the lower Colorado River at Yuma Crossing, as part of a new pueblo (secular settlement), in the homeland of the Quechan peoples (Yuma or Kwítsaín). Garcés tried to keep peace between all parties. The formerly peaceful rapport with the Quechan was lost due to Spanish settlers allegedly violating the treaty with the native peoples, resulting in the losses of crops and farmlands. In July 1781, Garcés, Díaz and their fellow friars were among those killed in a violent uprising at the Mission San Pedro y San Pablo de Bicuñer, known as the Yuma Uprising and Yuma Revolt.

Garcés's body was later reinterred at Mission San Pedro y San Pablo del Tubutama. He and the other friars killed at those missions are considered martyrs by the Catholic Church.

== Legacy ==
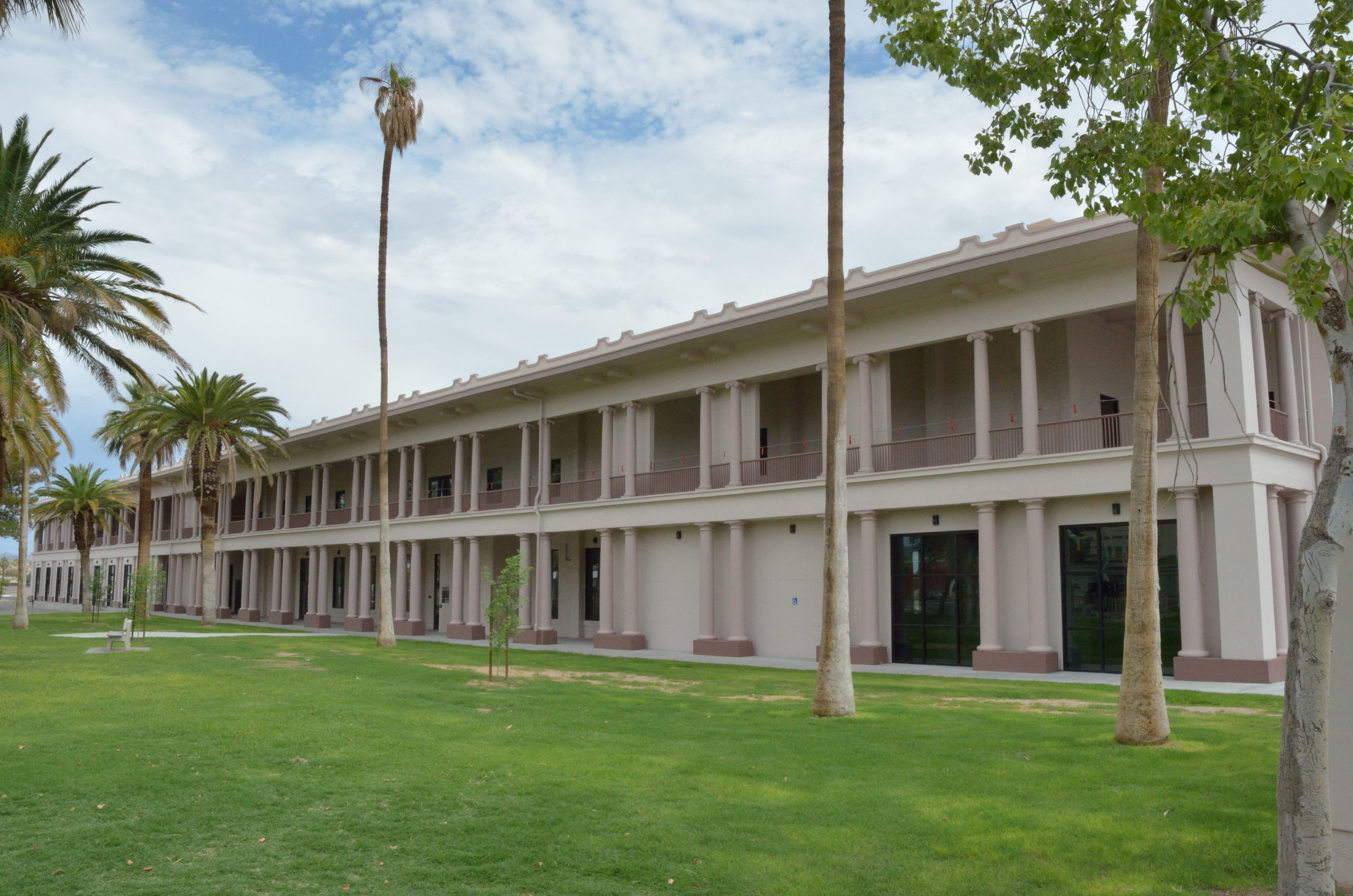
The El Garces Hotel in Needles, California, built in 1908 and named for Garcés.

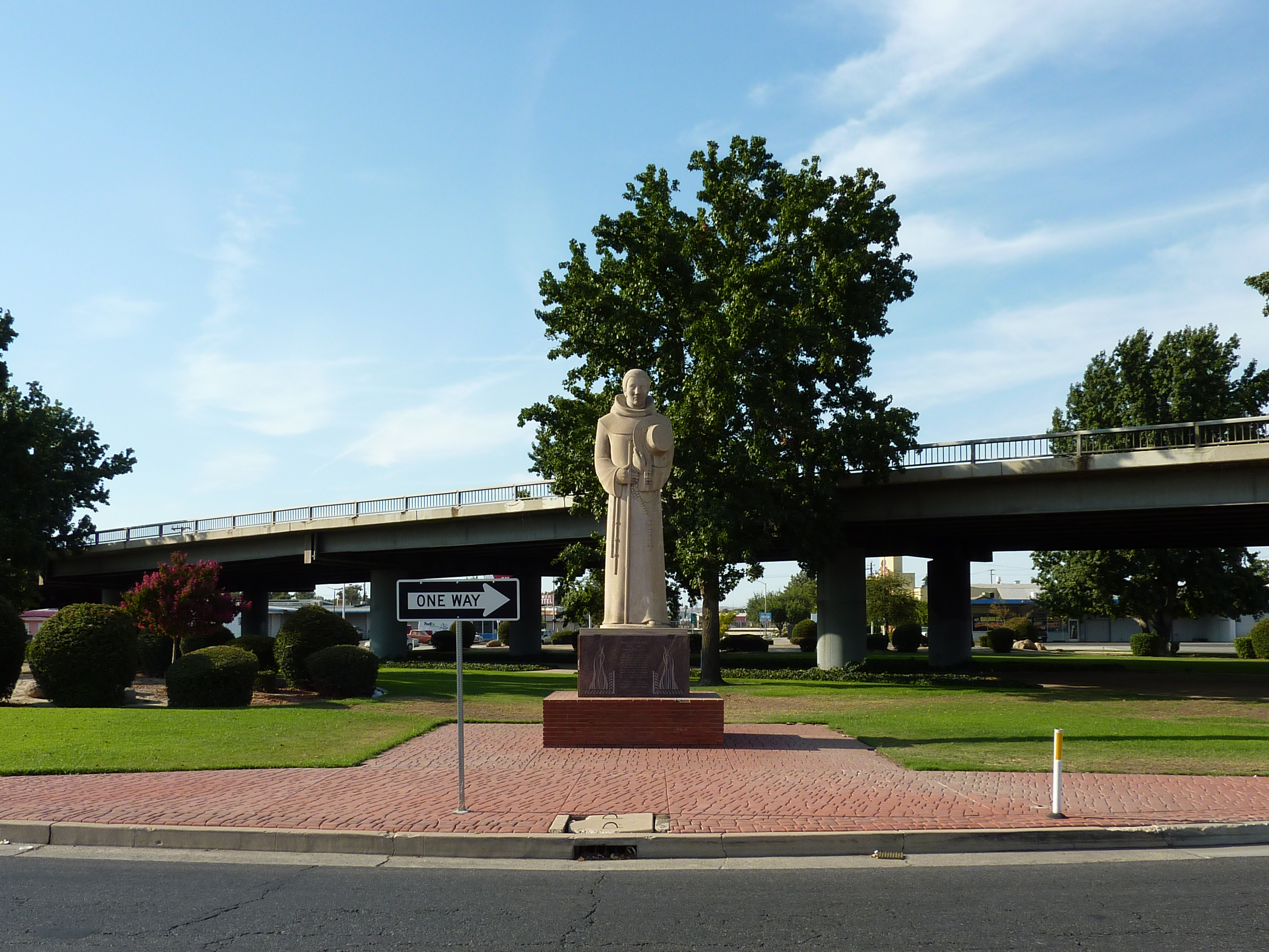
Garces Memorial Circle in Bakersfield, California, memorializes when Garcés came to the area of modern-day Bakersfield in 1776.

El Garces Hotel

The El Garces Hotel, named in Francisco Garcés's honor, is the historic 1908 Santa Fe Railroad station and Harvey House hotel 'oasis' located in the City of Needles. It is located in eastern California above the Colorado River, a site Garcés passed through during the 1776 Anza expedition. The El Garces Hotel was built by the Santa Fe Railroad under contract with the Fred Harvey Company. It is designed in an elegant Neoclassical and Beaux-Arts style, and the El Garces was considered the "Crown Jewel" of the entire Fred Harvey chain.

National Forest

Garces National Forest was established by the U.S. Forest Service in southern Arizona on July 1, 1908, with 78,480 acres (317.6 km^{2}) from portions of Baboquivari, Tumacacori and Huachuca National Forests. The name was discontinued in 1911 when it was combined with Coronado National Forest.

Bakersfield

The first Tejon Pass (original) between the Mojave Desert (and New Spain) over the Tehachapi Mountains to the southern San Joaquin Valley floor (future site of Bakersfield), California, had been discovered by Garcés in 1776, eastward from the Anza Colonizing Expedition route. Therefore, there are several landmarks for Francisco Garcés in Bakersfield, California: Garces Memorial High School, the city's Catholic high school; and on Chester Avenue Garces Memorial Circle, with a memorial statue of Garcés.

Las Vegas, Nevada

The original platted east–west streets of the 1905 Las Vegas Township are all named for significant North American explorers, beginning with Stewart on the north, then Ogden, Fremont, Carson, Bridger, Lewis, Clark, Bonneville, Gass, and finally Garces on the south.

Reno, Nevada

St. Thomas Aquinas Cathedral has a stained glass window dedicated to Fray Garces.

== See also ==
- Spanish missions in the Sonoran Desert
- Spanish missions in Baja California
- California Historical Landmarks in Kern County
- California Historical Landmark
- Canyon of the Little Christians

== Notes ==
=== References ===
- Garcés, Francisco. 1900. On the Trail of a Spanish Pioneer: The Diary and Itinerary of Francisco Garcés. Edited by Elliott Coues. Two vols. Francis P. Harper, New York, NY.
- Garcés, Francisco. 1967. A Record of Travels in Arizona and California, 1775–1776. Edited by John Galvin. John Howell, San Francisco.
