= Mission Puerto de Purísima Concepción =

Former 18th-century Spanish mission in California

Coordinates: 32.730583°N 114.615617°W

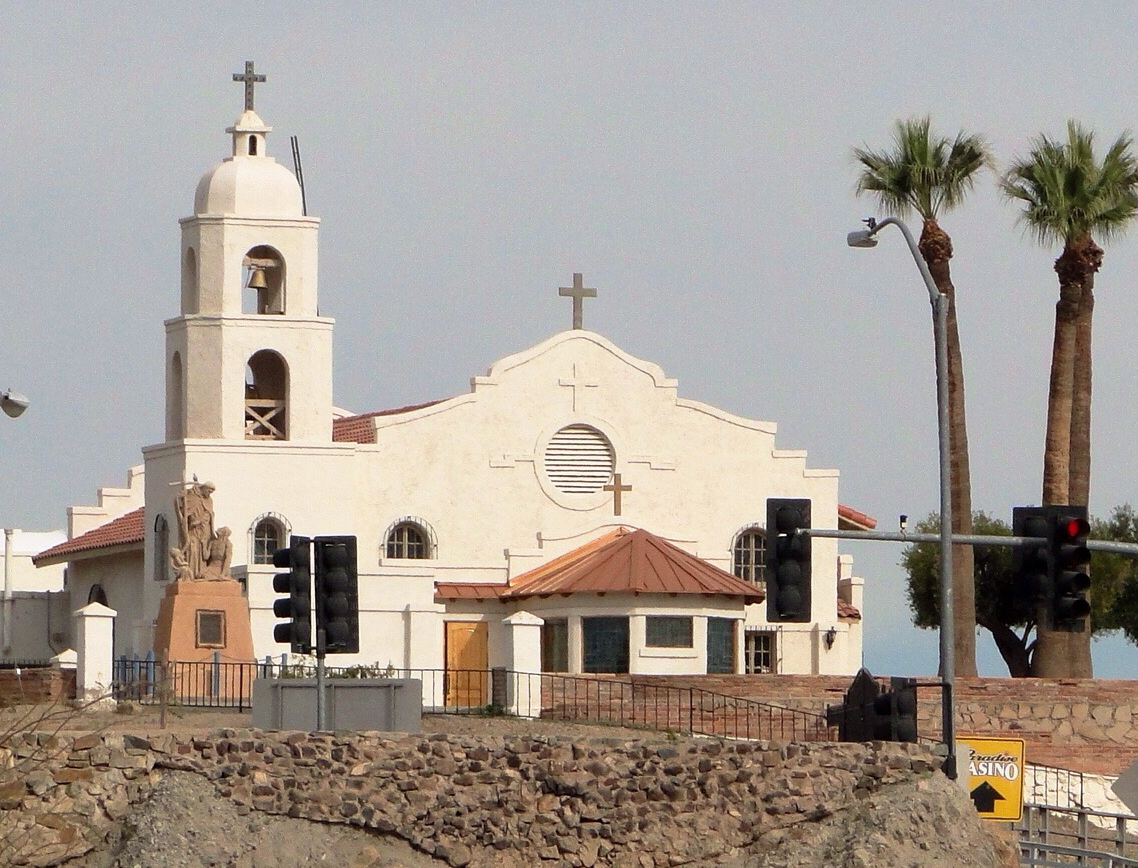
- A 1923 reconstruction of the original mission
- Location: Winterhaven, California
- Name as founded: La Misión Puerto de Purísima Concepción
- English translation: The Mission Port of Purest Conception
- Patron: The Immaculate Conception
- Founded: October 1780
- Founded by: Fathers Juan Barreneche and Francisco Garcés
- Founding Order: Franciscans
- Native tribe(s) Spanish name(s): Quechan; Yuma
- Current use: Nonextant

California Historical Landmark
- Official name: Mission la Purísima Concepción (site of)
- Reference no.: #350

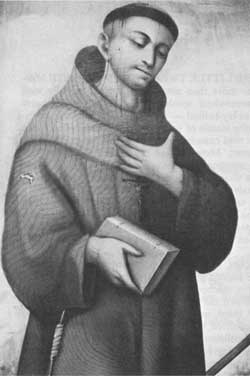
Francisco Garcés in 1775

Mission Puerto de Purísima Concepción was founded near what is now Yuma, Arizona, United States, on the California side of the Colorado River, in October 1780, by the Franciscan missionary Francisco Garcés. The settlement was not part of the California mission chain but was administered as a part of the Spanish missions in Arizona. The Mission site and nearby pueblo were inadequately supported, and Spanish colonists seized the best lands, destroyed the Indians' crops, and generally ignored the rights of the local natives. In retaliation the Quechan (Yuma) Indians and their allies attacked and destroyed the installation and the neighboring Mission San Pedro y San Pablo de Bicuñer over the three days from July 17 to 19, 1781.

Today, only a historical marker on Picacho Road in Fort Yuma, California, one mile south of Winterhaven Road identifies the site.

California Historical Landmarks read:

NO. 350 MISSION LA PURÍSIMA CONCEPCIÓN (SITE OF) – In October 1780, Father Francisco Garcés and companions began Mission La Purísima Concepción. The mission/pueblo site was inadequately supported. Colonists ignored Indian rights, usurped the best lands, and destroyed Indian crops. Completely frustrated and disappointed, the Quechans (Yumas) and their allies destroyed Concepción on July 17–19, 1781.

== See also ==
- California Historical Landmarks in Imperial County
- Spanish missions in Arizona
- Spanish missions in the Sonoran Desert
- Spanish missions in Baja California
- California Historical Landmark
