= Quechan language =

Yuman language spoken in California and Arizona

Quechan
- Yuma
- Kwatsáan Iiyáa
- Pronunciation: /kʷt͡sa:n/
- Native to: United States
- Region: California, Arizona
- Ethnicity: c. 10,000 Quechan
- Native speakers: (150 cited 1994)
- Language family: Yuman: Core Yuman; River Yuman; Quechan

Language codes
- ISO 639-3: yum
- Glottolog: quec1382
- ELP: Quechan
- Yuma County with Fort Yuma Indian Reservation, where Quechan is spoken, highlighted

- Quechan is classified as Definitely Endangered by the UNESCO Atlas of the World's Languages in Danger.

Quechan or Kwtsaan (/kʷt͡sa:n/, Kwatsáan Iiyáa), also known as Yuma, is the native language of the Quechan people of southeastern California and southwestern Arizona in the Lower Colorado River Valley and Sonoran Desert. Despite its name, it is not related to the Quechua language of the Andes.

Quechan belongs to the River branch of the Yuman language family, together with Mohave and Maricopa languages. Publications have documented Quechan grammar and texts.

In 1980, it was estimated that there were fewer than 700 speakers of the language, including both the elderly and young. Hinton put a conservative estimate of the number of speakers at 150, and a liberal estimate at 400–500. As of 2009, 93 preschoolers were learning Quechan in the Quechan tribe's language preservation program, and the number of fluent speakers was estimated to be about 100. A Quechan dictionary was in progress.

In 2020, it was estimated that there were approximately 60 speakers of the language in California.

Quechan speakers participate in the Yuman Family Language Summit, held annually since 2001.

A 2010 documentary, Songs of the Colorado, by filmmaker Daniel Golding features traditional songs in the Quechan language. Golding says, "The songs are all sung in the language, so if you're not learning and picking up the language, then you won't be able to understand the songs ... there are actually words telling stories..."

Assistance is available for speakers of the language who wish to vote in elections in Imperial County, California, and Yuma County, Arizona, under Section 203 of the Voting Rights Act of 1965.

== Phonology ==
=== Vowels ===
Quechan has five vowel phonemes, which all occur in short and long forms. Vowel length is contrastive, as shown in ʔa·vé "snake" versus ʔa·vé· "mouse".

	Front	Central	Back
Close	i iː		u uː
Mid	e eː	ə	o oː
Open		a aː	

=== Consonants ===
The consonants in Quechan are given in the table below.

		Bilabial	Dental		Alveolar		Retroflex	Palatal	Velar			Uvular		Glottal
		Bilabial	plain	pal.	plain	pal.	Retroflex	Palatal	plain	lab.	pal.	plain	lab.	Glottal
Plosive		p	t	tʲ			ʈ		k	kʷ	kʲ	q	qʷ	ʔ
Affricate					t͡s									
Fricative	voiceless				s		ʂ		x	xʷ				
Fricative	voiced	β	ð											
Fricative	lateral				ɬ	ɬʲ								
Nasal		m	n					ɲ	ŋ					
Rhotic					r									
Lateral					l			ʎ						
Approximant		w						j						

Quechan features word-medial and word-final consonant clusters. Word-medial clusters may be biconsonantal or triconsonantal, while word-final clusters only appear with two consonants.

The semivowels w and j occur as consonants when in a word-initial position, when intervocalic, and as final members of consonant clusters. They occur as vowels when in the word-final position and as initial members of vowel clusters.

=== Phonological processes ===
A variety of processes affect the realization of sounds in Quechan, a few of which are listed below.

- kʷ is delabialized before the vowel u· as in kwu·hamí "the procreator", which is typically pronounced [kuːxami]. The orthography kʷ is retained because a labialized pronunciation of kʷ is accepted as over-careful.
- xʷ is similarly delabialized as in hwu·ʔá·vənʸ "her jealousy."
- The affricate c varies in pronunciation from a dental to an alveolar affricate. When followed by a t, c is pronounced as s, as in aʔíctaʔa "so they said," which is pronounced [aʔistaʔa].
- The phonemes m, n, l, and r are pronounced as long forms when preceded by an accented short vowel as in nakkámək "he touches."
- r is typically pronounced as [r], but when it is preceded by š and an unaccented short vowel it has a retroflex pronunciation as in šaréq "he grasps."
- When two of nʸ, lʸ and łʸ come into contact, the first loses its palatalization but is articulated at a slightly higher point than the corresponding unpalatalized phoneme, as in nu·mínʸnʸa "their passing by."

== Morphology ==
=== Word structure ===
Quechan words consist of two immediate constituents: a theme and non-thematic elements. Themes are structures consisting of unanalyzable root morphemes that form the basis of Quechan words. Themes can consist of stems in isolation, reduplicated, or affixed.

Words usually include one or more nonthematic affixes which can be either nominal or verbal. Themes can be split into noun themes, verbal themes and interjectional themes. Nouns are words composed of noun themes and nominal affixes, verbs are words composed of verbal themes and verbal affixes, and interjections are themes with no affixes added.

=== Nouns ===
Quechan nouns consist of a theme alone or a theme plus non thematic affixes. The primary function of a noun is to convey simple referential content. There are four types of nonthematic elements that can be affixed to nouns: pronominal prefixes, demonstrative suffixes, the locative suffix -i, and case suffixes.

==== Pronominal prefixes ====
Possessive pronominal prefixes indicate first, second, third and indefinite third person possessor. There are two distinct sets of possessive prefixes.

	I	II
1st person	ʔ-	ʔanʸ-
2nd person	m-	manʸ-
3rd person	∅-	nʸ-
Indef. 3rd person	kʷ-	kʷanʸ-

The first set of prefixes is used primarily with body parts and kinship terms, while the second is used primarily with natural objects and artifacts but also certain body part terms. The distinction is not that between inalienable and alienable possession: for example, i·kʷé "his horn" refers to both a deer's horn and a person's deer horn.

==== Demonstrative suffixes ====
The demonstrative suffixes in Quechan are -va "this (nearby)," -sa, "that (far off)," and -nʸ "that (location unspecified)."

==== Locative suffix ====
The locative suffix -i is roughly equivalent in meaning to English "at, in the vicinity of." It is primarily affixed to the noun theme plus a demonstrative suffix: i·mé šama·vi (i·mé "foot," šamá· "root" + -va "this" + -i "at") "at his feet, underfoot" (literally "at the root of his foot").

==== Case suffixes ====
Noun themes with case suffixes function as subjects of verbs, adverbs, or, with vocative -a, as a predicative expression: šalʸʔáyc ʔamé·k "the sand is high," literally "sand it-is-high."

Nominative	-c
Locative	-k
Allative	-lʸ
Ablative	-m
Vocative	-a

The following suffix combinations are found (with -nʸ representing the demonstrative suffixes):

Case suffix	With nothing	With a demonstrative suffix	With the locative suffix	With a demonstrative and locative suffix
Absolute	-∅	-nʸ	-I	-nʸi
Nominative	-c	-nʸc		
Locative	-k	-nʸk	-ik	-nʸik
Allative	-lʸ	-nʸǝlʸ	-ilʸ	-nʸilʸ
Ablative	-m	-nʸǝm	-im	-nʸim
Vocative	-a	-nʸa		

=== Verbs ===
Quechan verbs convey most meaning in sentences, including indication of notional and grammatical relationships, in contrast to nouns which are comparatively simple in content.

Verbs typically consist of a theme and two nonthematic elements, a pronominal prefix and a predicative suffix as in ʔayú·k "I see", which is composed of first person pronominal prefix ʔ + "to see" ayú + present-past suffix ·k.

Verb stems that form the basis of verb themes can be modified in a variety of ways to modify their meaning.

==== Reduplication ====
Some verb stems can be reduplicated to add the meaning of repetitive or intermittent activity. An example of a reduplicated stem is toxatóx "to be spotted", from the stem atóx "to have a spot." Another example is aspukaspúk "to be kinky (hair)", from the stem aspúk "to be curled.

==== Thematic prefixes ====
A variety of thematic prefixes can be added to the verb stem to give the stem meaning.

One such prefix is t- "to cause generally or by means of an instrument." The stem qʷeraqʷér "to be sharp-pointed" can be modified by t- to produce the stem taqʷeraqʷér "to sharpen to a point."

Prefixes can be compounded, which most frequently occurs with the causative prefix u·- in addition to another prefix. The causative prefix u·- is affixed in conjunction with the prefix c- "to cause with the teeth" present in caqáw "to eat fruit," producing the compound u·caqáw "to feed fruit to."

==== Infixation ====
A theme consisting of only a stem or a prefix-stem structure can be further developed through infixation. Infixing u· before the consonant preceding the accented vowel of the stem in conjunction with the suffixation of a thematic suffix -v or -p produces a developed theme with the meaning "to be one who does."

An example is the theme ku·nácv "to be one who orders" which is produced by infixing u· and affixing -v to the stem kanác "to order, summon."

== Syntax ==
=== Word order ===
Quechan has a subject-object-verb word order.

=== Switch reference ===
Like other Yuman languages, Quechan features switch-reference by which two clauses can be linked with markers specifying whether their subjects are the same or different.

== Sample text ==
The following is an excerpt from a traditional Quechan story called "The Man Who Bothered Ants."

Pa'iipáats suuváat.
Pa'iipáats nyaváyk suuváa.

Pa'iipáats 'atáyk nyaváyk viivák,
athúus
athótk
aváts 'ashéntək alyuuváapətəka.
Tsam'athúlyəm éevtək uuváat.

'Anyáayk viithíim,
amanək,
tsam'athúly nyaványa,
tsam'athúly kéek a'ét.
'Anyétsəts nyuu'ítsk.

Someone was over there.
Someone was living over there.

A lot of people were living here,
but
it happened
that this (person) was the only one (who did it).
He bothered ants.

When the sun came up,
he got up,
and as for the ants' nest,
he was going to stir up the ants.
We say that.
