= Quechan =

Ethnic group and federally-recognized tribe in Arizona, United States

Kwatsáan

Total population
- 10,089 (2010)

Regions with significant populations
- Arizona; California

Languages
- Quechan, English, Spanish

Religion
- traditional tribal religion, Catholicism

Related ethnic groups
- Maricopa, Mojave, Kumeyaay, Yavapai, Cocopah

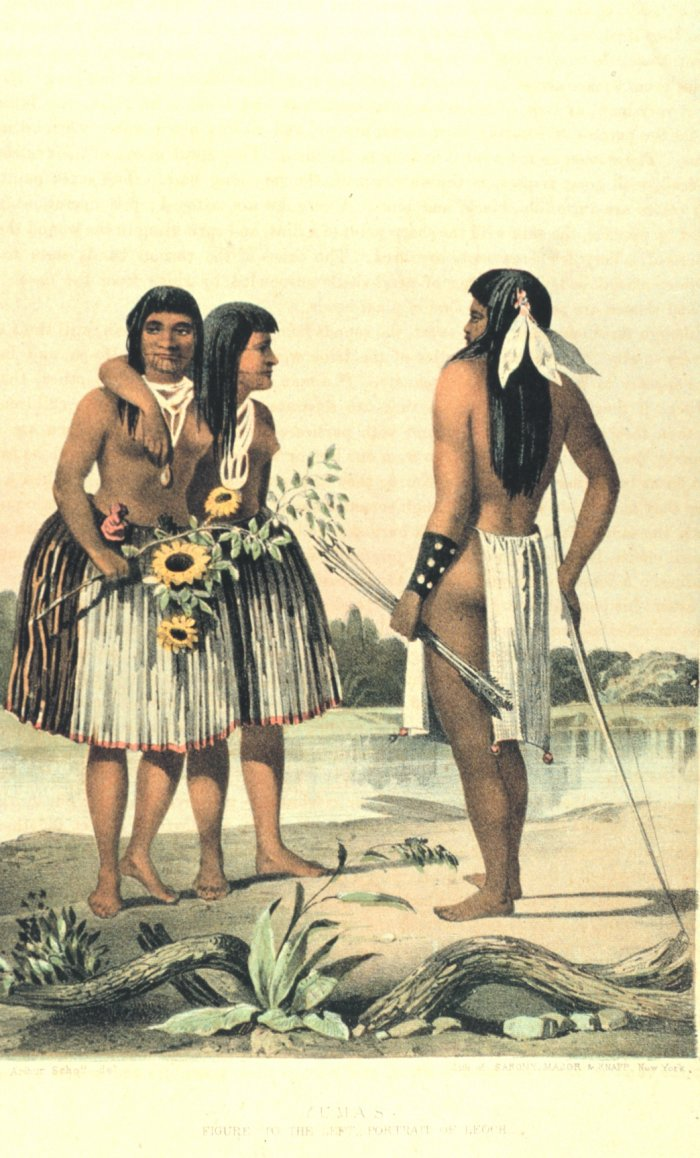
Yumas in "United States and Mexican Boundary Survey. Report of William H. Emory…" Washington, 1857, Volume I

The Quechan (Quechan: Kwatsáan 'those who descended'), or Yuma, are a Native American tribe who live on the Fort Yuma Indian Reservation on the lower Colorado River in Arizona and California just north of the Mexican border. Despite their name, they are not related to the Quechua people of the Andes. Members are enrolled in the Quechan Tribe of the Fort Yuma Indian Reservation. The federally recognized Quechan tribe's main office is located in Winterhaven, California. Its operations and the majority of its reservation land are located in California, United States.

== History ==
The historic Yuman-speaking people in this region were skilled warriors and active traders, maintaining exchange networks with the Pima in southern Arizona, New Mexico, and with peoples of the Pacific coast.

The first significant contact of the Quechan with Europeans was with the Spanish explorer Juan Bautista de Anza and his party in the winter of 1774. Relations were friendly. On Anza's return from his second trip to Alta California in 1776, the chief of the tribe and three of his men journeyed to Mexico City to petition the Viceroy of New Spain for the establishment of a mission. The chief Palma and his three companions were baptized in Mexico City on February 13, 1777. Palma was given the Spanish baptismal name Salvador Carlos Antonio.

Once the initial contact had been made, The Quechan people seemed inviting toward Juan Bautista de Anza. He promised them to set up a mission where all people would live together instead of in a hierarchy. Alongside the promise, de Anza gave Palma’s people horses, steel weapons, clothes, and iron as a token of allegiance.

This allegiance would soon sour as the bureaucracy of the Spanish Empire would cause major delays to the construction of the missions. When the Spanish’s first gifts arrived in 1780, they would be more of a bad omen than a sign of friendship as the livestock being herded to them would go and trample most of if not all the Quechan’s crops. That year there was severe lack of rain thus forcing the Quechan to raid another nearby tribe known as the Maricopa.

The following year, two high members of the tribe were arrested for allegedly plotting to assassinate a high-ranking officer. One of the natives was placed in stocks to humiliate them and this caused Palma to finally turn his back on the Spanish.

Spanish settlement among the Quechan did not go smoothly; the tribe rebelled from July 17–19, 1781 and killed four priests and thirty soldiers. They also attacked and damaged the Spanish mission settlements of San Pedro y San Pablo de Bicuñer and Puerto de Purísima Concepción, killing many. The following year, the Spanish retaliated with military action against the tribe. After 1840, the Quechan people near La Frontera returned to their original ways of religious practice as soon as the mission priests left and no one replaced them.

After the United States annexed the territories after winning the Mexican–American War, it engaged in the Yuma War from 1850 to 1853 in response to a conflict between the Quechan and Jaeger's Ferry and the Glanton Gang, after the Quechan had established a rival ferry service on the Colorado River. During which, the historic Fort Yuma was built across the Colorado River from the present day Yuma, Arizona.

== La Sierra de las Pintas ==
The Sierra de las Pintas was a mountain range that most Spanish expeditions would actively avoid. Spanish explorers were able to see the range, but avoided exploring due to the Quechan informing them that it was uninhabitable and had no drinkable water sources.

When the Spanish had the Yumans guide them through the Sierra de las Pintas, they would take the Spanish to an area with little to no water in order to discourage further exploration.

The Spanish later on attempted to explore the mountain range, searching for water in creative ways. Explorers would follow herds of Bighorn Sheep up the mountain or by chance would find small patches of vegetation pointing toward a hidden water source.

== The Yuma Route ==
The Yuma route was a trail that ran from Southern New Mexico and reached Chihuahua and Sonora. The trail branched out even further to reach the Los Angeles Basin, San Diego, Colorado River and the Gila River. This route was well established before the arrival of the Spanish, and used as a trade route amongst the tribes of the areas.

At first, the Spanish used minor portions of the trail. It was not until San Diego and Monterey were established that they needed a more reliable and faster path. The path was first walked by Sebastian Taraval, a Cochimi person who fled from San Gabriel. Sebastian was then followed by Captain Juan Bautista de Anza. Anza was only able to follow Sebastian to the Imperial Valley Kamia village, where he lost Sebastian and was forced to reach the Quechan people on his own.

== Population ==
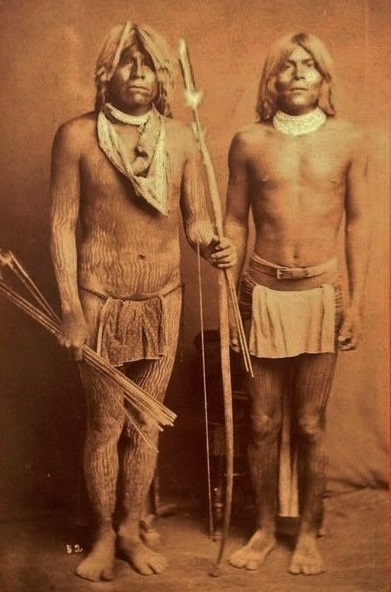
Two Quechans in about 1875

Estimates for the pre-contact populations of most native groups in California have varied substantially (see population of Native California). Alfred L. Kroeber (1925:883) put the 1770 population of the Quechan at 2,500. Jack D. Forbes (1965:341–343) compiled historical estimates and suggested that before they were first contacted, the Quechan had numbered 4,000 or a few more.

Kroeber estimated the population of the Quechan in 1910 as 750. By 1950, there were reported to be just under 1,000 Quechan living on the reservation and more than 1,100 off it (Forbes 1965:343). The 2000 census reported a resident population of 2,376 persons on the Fort Yuma Indian Reservation. As of 2023, there are about 4,000 active members of the tribe living on or near the reservation.

== Language ==
The Quechan language is part of the Yuman language family.

The Quechan tribe, in partnership with linguists, have created a fully detailed language guide. This guide includes sections about their alphabet along with the different words for actions, animals, the body, colors, directions, family and friends, house, money, nature and the environment, numbers, place names, plants, time, and shapes.

== Fort Yuma Native American Reservation ==
The Fort Yuma Indian Reservation is a part of the Quechan's traditional lands. Established in 1884, the reservation, at 32°47′N 114°39′W, has a land area of 178.197 km^{2} (68.802 sq mi) in southeastern Imperial County, California, and western Yuma County, Arizona, near the city of Yuma, Arizona. Both the county and city are named for the tribe.

== See also ==
- Quechan traditional narratives
- Quechan language
- Fort Yuma
- Blythe geoglyphs
- Indigenous peoples of the Americas
- Classification of indigenous peoples of the Americas
- Native Americans in the United States
