= California Historical Landmarks in Imperial County =

List table of the properties and districts listed as California Historical Landmarks within Imperial County, Southern California.

- Note: Click the "Map of all coordinates" link to the right to view a Google map of all properties and districts with latitude and longitude coordinates in the table below.

== Listings ==
Image		Landmark name	Location	City or town	Summary
Camp Pilot Knob	985	Camp Pilot Knob	Sidewinder Rd. 32°45′03″N 114°45′17″W	Felicity	Part of the Desert Training Center, California-Arizona Maneuver Area, Established by Major General George S. Patton, Jr. (#985)
Camp Salvation	808	Camp Salvation	Rockwood Plaza, 6th St E. & Heber Ave. 32°40′12″N 115°29′36″W	Calexico	Site is now City Hall of Calexico
Charley's World of Lost Art	939.4	Charley's World of Lost Art	32°43′51″N 114°43′37″W	Andrade	Part of the Twentieth Century Folk Art Environments (#939)
Fort Yuma	806	Fort Yuma	350 Picacho Rd. 32°43′54″N 114°36′56″W	Winterhaven	
Hernando de Alarcón Expedition	568	Hernando de Alarcón Expedition	Algondes Rd. 32°44′15″N 114°43′00″W	Winterhaven	
Mission Puerto de Purísima Concepción	350	Mission Puerto de Purísima Concepción	Fort Yuma; 32°43′50″N 114°36′56″W	Winterhaven	Site of former Mission
Mountain Springs Station	194	Mountain Springs Station	I-8; 32°39′33″N 116°05′59″W	Jacumba	
Picacho Mines	193	Picacho Mines	Picacho Rd. 32°58′19″N 114°38′07″W	Winterhaven	
Plank Road	845	Plank Road	Grays Well Road; 32°42′37″N 114°55′22″W	Winterhaven	
Fort Romualdo Pacheco	944	Fort Romualdo Pacheco	West bank of New River; 32°50′50″N 115°40′58″W	Imperial	Site of former Fort, now present day Imperial Valley College Museum
Site of Mission San Pedro y San Pablo de Bicuñer	921	Site of Mission San Pedro y San Pablo de Bicuñer	County Rd. S24; 32°48′59″N 114°30′54″W	Bard	Site of former Mission
Tecolote Rancho Site	1034	Tecolote Rancho Site	East Country Hwy & Barbara Worth Rd. 32°48′00″N 115°25′18″W	Holtville	Harold Bell Wright home
Tumco Mines	182	Tumco Mines	Gold Rack Ranch Rd. 32°52′55″N 114°51′44″W	Ogilby	
Yuha Well	1008	Yuha Well	Eastbound Sunbeam Roadside Rest Area, I-8; 32°46′25″N 115°40′13″W	Seeley	

== See also ==
- List of California Historical Landmarks
- National Register of Historic Places listings in Imperial County, California
