= Salton Sea (disambiguation) =

The Salton Sea is a saline lake in the Colorado Desert of Southern California.

Salton Sea may also refer to:

== Places ==
- Salton Sea Airport
- Salton Sea Beach, California, a community on the lake
- Salton Sea State Recreation Area, a state park located on the northeastern side of the sea
- Naval Auxiliary Air Station Salton Sea, a defunct U.S. Navy facility

== Entertainment ==
- Salton Sea, a 2012 album by Tomas Barfod
- The Salton Sea (2002 film), starring Val Kilmer and Vincent D'Onofrio
- The Salton Sea (2016 film), starring Jamie Anne Allman
- Salton Sea (2018 film), starring Joel Bissonnette
- Miracle in the Desert: The Rise and Fall of the Salton Sea (2020 film), award-winning documentary

== Other ==
- Salton Sea Authority

== See also ==
- Salton (disambiguation)
- Salt Lake (disambiguation)
- Salton Trough
- Salton Sink
- Dead Sea or the Salt Sea
