= Hedges, California =

Locale in California

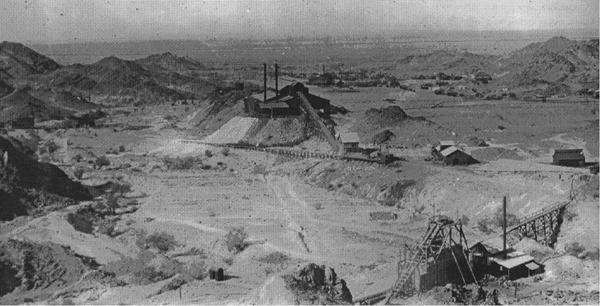
Golden Cross Mine, around 1900. Hedges (later Tumco), California

Hedges, later renamed Tumco, is a locale, a ghost town, site of a former mining town, in Imperial County, California. It lies at an elevation of 617 feet / 188 meters along the Tumco Wash in the Cargo Muchacho Mountains. Nearby is the Hedges Cemetery at an elevation of 643 feet (196 meters), at 32°53′04″N 114°49′52″W.

== History ==
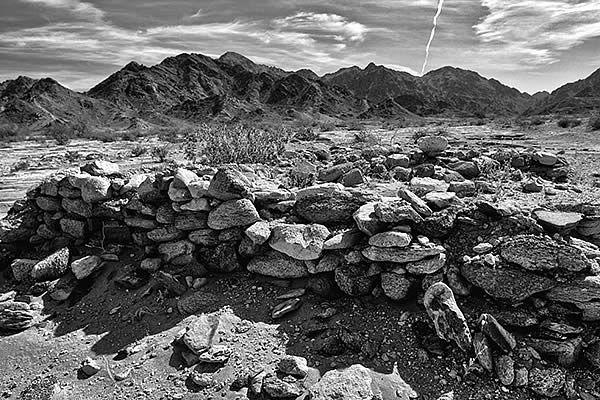
Ruins in the vicinity of the old Golden Cross mine, Tumco ghost town. 2014 photo

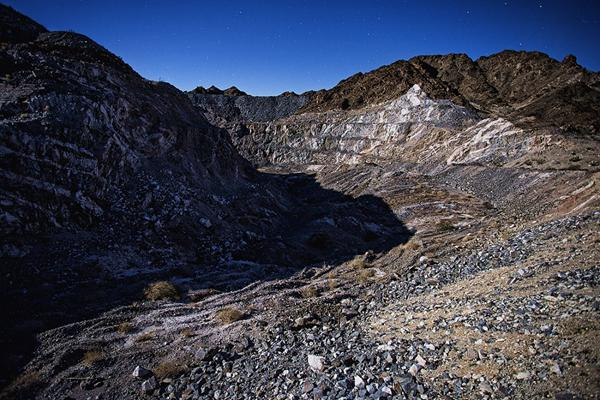
Golden Cross Mine area in 2014, Tumco

Gold mining had been going on in the western Cargo Muchacho Mountains by the Spanish in the early 1780s until the Yuma Revolt ended mining there until the Mexicans returned to the area after 1823. Mexican miners prospected and mined there prior to 1848, the name of the mountains date from this period. Mining was conducted mostly by Sonoran miners familiar with dry washing techniques and using arrastras to extract gold from the ore taken from small mines scattered across the mountains. Lt. Williamson's Pacific Railroad exploration party, passing the mountains in 1853 reported seeing several quartz veins from three inches to a foot or two in thickness there. Despite this report, no American miners began large scale development of the mines until the Southern Pacific Railroad passed by the location to Yuma in 1877. Ogilby, a railroad stop, was founded nearby in 1877 and became the rail-head and supply point for the mines and camps in the Cargo Muchacho Mountains.

Hedges began as the Gold Rock mining camp, that grew up around the Gold Rock Mine discovered by Peter Walters in 1884. He soon thereafter sold out to developers who renamed the mine the Golden Cross in 1892. In 1893, Golden Cross Mining and Milling Company began a development program bringing in a stamp mill to work the ore in the local mines. The camp grew into a town amidst the mines, named Hedges, in honor of the firm's vice president C. L. Hedges. The town was renamed Tumco in 1910, for The United Mines Company, the company that bought the Gold Cross mining company from its previous owners. The Tumco Mine operated from 1892 until 1917, and again from 1937 until 1942. The town in the late 1800s had a population of several thousand, but by 1942 it only had 30.

Tumco Historic Mine is currently operated by the Bureau of Land Management.

== California Historical Landmark ==
The Tumco Mines are a California Historical Landmarks and reads:

NO. 182 TUMCO MINES - Pete Walters of Ogilby discovered the first gold vein at Gold Rock on January 6, 1884. From his Little Mary Claim began a gold camp which reached its peak development between 1893 and 1899 as Hedges, with 3,200 residents. Nearly closed, 1900-10, it was reopened as Tumco, 1910-13, and worked intermittently until 1941. Tumco has long been a California ghost town.

== See also ==
- California Historical Landmarks in Imperial County
- California Historical Landmark
- List of ghost towns in California
