= Obregon, California =

Unincorporated community in California, United States

Obregon
- Unincorporated community
- Location in California Obregon (the United States)
- Coordinates: 32°51′29″N 114°47′21″W
- Country: United States
- State: California
- County: Imperial County
- Elevation: 663 ft (202 m)

Obregon (Spanish: Obregón) is an unincorporated community in Imperial County, California. It is located 4 miles (6.4 km) northeast of Ogilby, at an elevation of 663 feet (202 m). Obregon was a mining town in the Cargo Muchacho Mountains located near the American Girl Mine. The town was abandoned in 1939, when the mine was closed.
