= Tumco Wash =

Tumco Wash is a wash in the Cargo Muchacho Mountains of Imperial County, California. Its mouth is located at an elevation of 243 feet / 74 meters at the foot of the Sand Hills of the Algodones Dunes south of the mountains. Its source is located in the mountains east of Hedges at an elevation of 960 feet, at 32°52′41″N 114°48′07″W.
