= KSAS (disambiguation) =

KSAS may refer to:

- The ICAO code for Salton Sea Airport, located in Salton City, California, United States
- KSAS-FM, a radio station (103.5 FM) licensed to Caldwell, Idaho, United States
- KSAS-TV, a television station (channel 24 analog/26 digital) licensed to Wichita, Kansas, United States
- KSAS-LP, a low-power television station (channel 29) licensed to Dodge City, Kansas, United States
