= Salton =

Salton or Saltoun may refer to:

== Places ==
- East Saltoun and West Saltoun, Scotland
- Salton, North Yorkshire, England
- Salton City, California
- Salton Sea
- Salton Sink
- Salton Trough

== Other uses ==
- Salton (surname), a surname
- Salton Inc., a manufacturer of home appliances

== See also ==
- Salton Sea (disambiguation)
