= Old Plank Road =

Historical trail and road in Imperial County, California

Plank Road
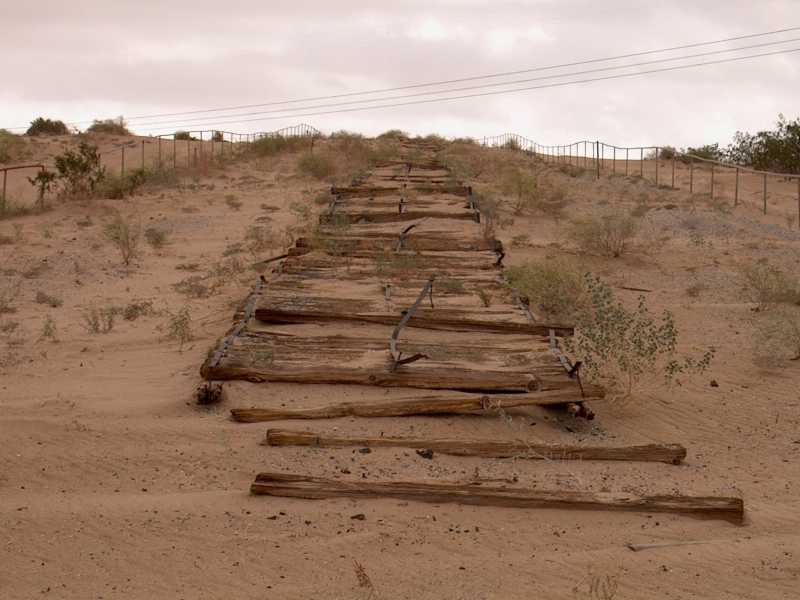
- Remains of Old Plank Road in 2001

- Location within California Location within the United States
- 32.710317°N 114.922783°W
- Location: Grays Well Road near Winterhaven, California

History
- Built: 1915

California Historical Landmark
- Reference no.: 845

The Old Plank Road is a plank road in Imperial County, California, that was built in 1915 as an east–west route over the Algodones Dunes. It effectively connected the extreme lower section of Southern California to Arizona and provided the last link in a commercial route between San Diego and Yuma.

== History ==
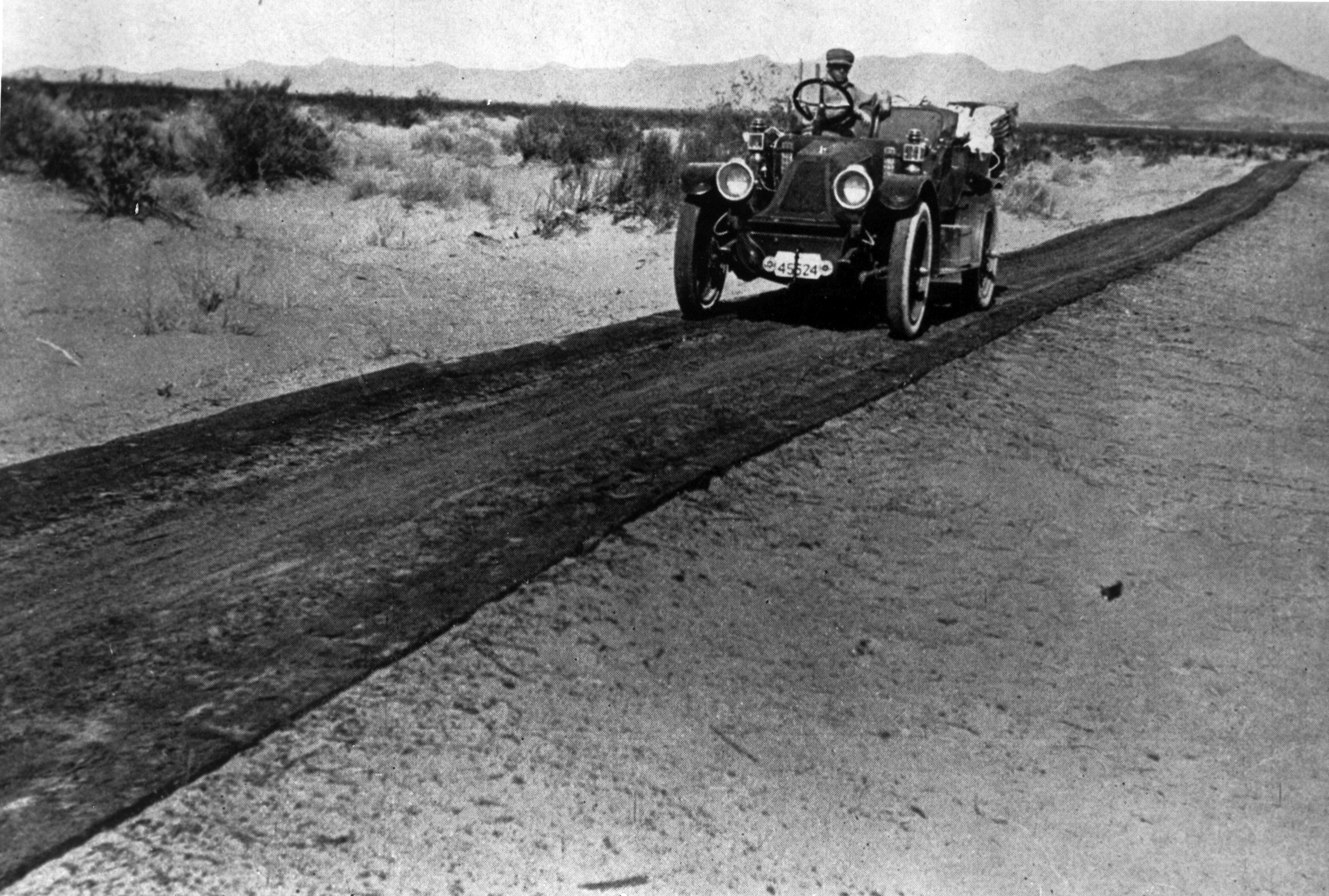
Car driving along the road

Following Los Angeles' winning the right to be the western terminus of the transcontinental railroad, San Diego's civic leaders proposed the Plank Road to ensure their city became the hub of Southern California's road network rather than Los Angeles.

Among those promoters was businessman and road builder "Colonel" Ed Fletcher who accepted a challenge from the Los Angeles Examiner to run a road race in October 1912 to determine the best route between Southern California and Phoenix. A reporter with the paper was given a 24-hour head start in Los Angeles; Fletcher would proceed from San Diego. Fletcher elected to traverse the constantly shifting sand dunes using a team of horses to pull his automobile through the sand, and won the race in a seemingly impossible 19.5 hours.

Buoyed by the success of the race and with the backing of local newspapers, Fletcher raised the money to pay for 13,000 planks shipped from San Diego to Holtville, California. The first planks were laid on February 14, 1915, with the help of both volunteers and paid labor. The roadbed consisted of two parallel plank tracks, each 25 inches/63.5 cm wide, spiked to wooden crosspieces laid underneath. The total length of the Plank Road was 6.5 miles/10.4 km. Work ended nearly two months later on April 4.

Though traffic and maintenance crews who cleared the wooden road with mule-drawn scrapers soon took its toll on the planking, the road was considered a success. In June 1915, the California State Highway Commission assumed responsibility for the Plank Road as part of the road system linking Southern California with Arizona.

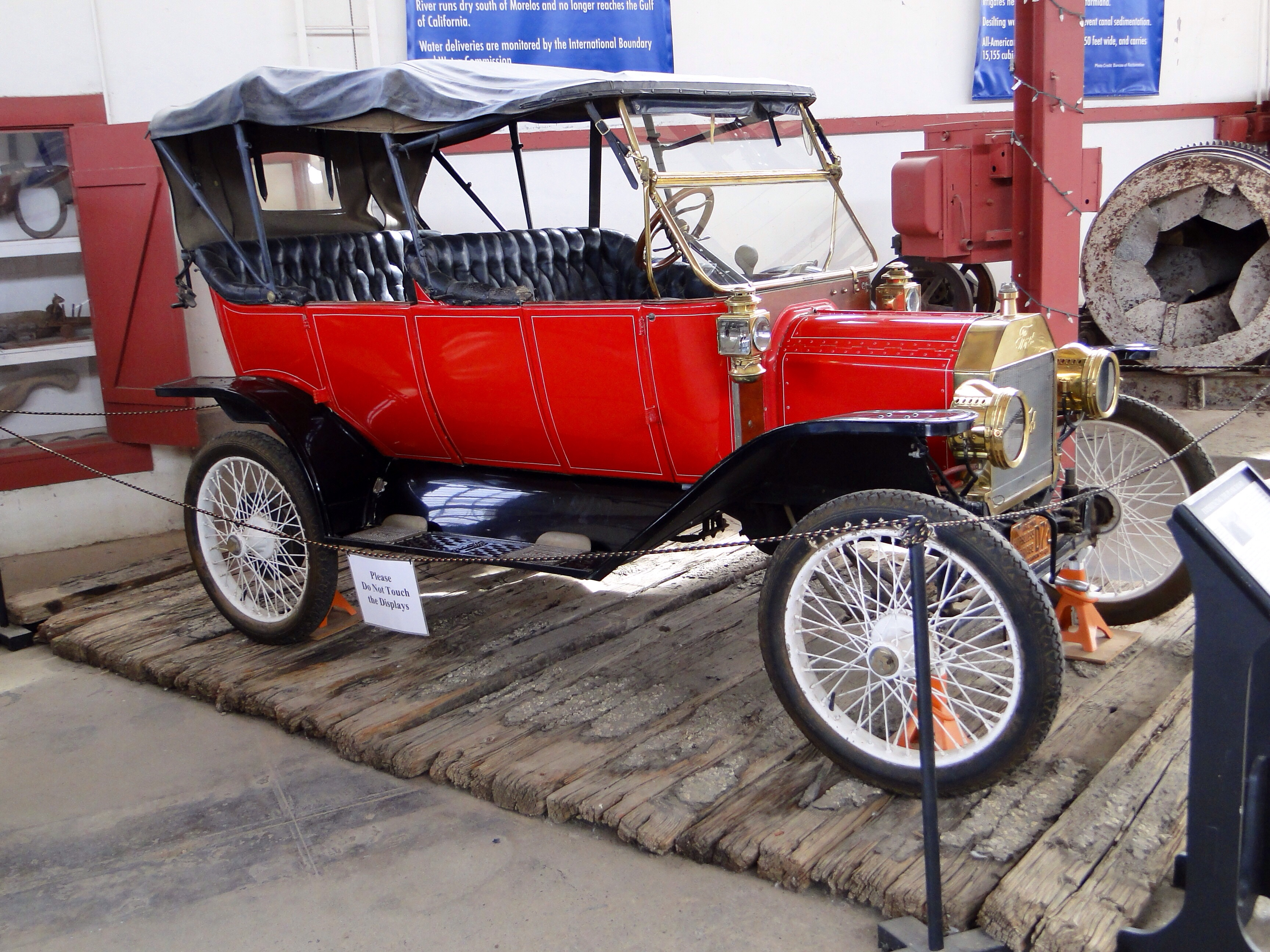
Remnants from Old Plank Road displayed at Yuma Quartermaster Depot Historic Park

A second, more sophisticated Plank Road was commissioned in 1916. The new roadway consisted of prefabricated wooden sections laid to a width of 8 feet/2.4 m with double-width turnouts every 1000 feet/305 m. The sections were shipped to the work site via horse-drawn wagon from their assembly point in nearby Ogilby, and then lowered into place using a crane.

For the next ten years, work crews struggled against the elements to keep the Plank Road open. The cost and difficulty of the maintenance coupled with improved road technology — not to mention the incredibly rough ride the planks created and the fact that the road was only wide enough for a single vehicle — meant that the days of the Plank Road were numbered.

A new, 20-foot/6-meter-wide road with an asphaltic concrete surface constructed on top of a built-up sand embankment replaced the Old Plank Road upon its opening on August 12, 1926. The same roadway later became displaced by U.S. Route 80, itself since displaced by Interstate 8.

Today, only fragments of the Plank Road remain. They are protected under the jurisdiction of the Bureau of Land Management as an Area of Critical Environmental Concern. The fragments are both a California Historical Landmark and eligible for inclusion in the National Register of Historic Places. Remnants of the Plank Road may be seen at the west end of Grays Well Road, a frontage road south of I-8. A monument to the Plank Road and interpretive display lie approximately three miles/5.4 km west of the Sand Hills interchange. The monument's largest feature is a 1500-foot/457-meter-long replica of the road created in the early 1970s out of existing fragments.

== California Historical Landmark ==
California Historical Landmark number 845 reads:

NO. 845 PLANK ROAD - This unique plank road, seven miles long, was the only means early motorists had of crossing the treacherous Imperial sand dunes. The 8-by-12-foot sections were moved with a team of horses whenever the shifting sands covered portions of the road. Double sections were placed at intervals to permit vehicles to pass

== See also ==
- California Historical Landmarks in Imperial County
- California Historical Landmark
