= Tumco Mine =

Gold mine in Imperial County, California

Coordinates: 32°52′51″N 114°48′56″W

Tumco Mine was a former gold mine in the Cargo Muchacho Mountains of Imperial County, California.
