= Heber Elementary School District =

School district in California, United States

Location
- 1051 Heber Ave. Heber, California 92249 United States

District information
- Established: 1908
- Superintendent: Juan Cruz
- Schools: Heber Elementary School Dogwood Elementary School

Other information
- Website: www.hebersd.org

Heber Elementary School District is a public school district based in Imperial County, California, United States.
