= Holtville Unified School District =

School district in California, United States

Location
- 621 East Sixth St. Holtville, California 92250 United States

Other information
- Website: www.husd.net

Holtville Unified School District is a public school district based in Imperial County, California, United States.
