= Meloland, California =

Unincorporated community in California, United States

Meloland
- Unincorporated community
- Location in California Meloland (the United States)
- Coordinates: 32°48′11″N 115°26′51″W
- Country: United States
- State: California
- County: Imperial County
- Elevation: −52 ft (−16 m)

Meloland is an unincorporated rural community in Imperial County, California. It is located on the Holton Interurban Railroad east of El Centro and 4 miles (6.4 km) west of Holtville. Prior to settlement, the location was known as Gleason or Gleason Switch.

Agricultural development of the area began on October 1, 1907, when R. P. Shepherd established the 280 acre "Rancho Meloland". The developers envisioned subdividing the surrounding lands, with Meloland to serve as a hub after obtaining a railway switch and station, general store, telegraph service, and packing facilities. A post office, store, and packing warehouse were in fact established in 1908, although the latter two buildings burned down soon after construction, with two workmen narrowly escaping the blaze. A month later, Shepherd sold the land holdings to J. R. Loftus.

Earlier in 1908, Shepherd had sold 40 acres to writer Harold Bell Wright, who built a house and artist's retreat on the property, which he called "Tecolote Rancho". Here he wrote The Calling of Dan Matthews, The Winning of Barbara Worth, and The Eyes of the World. In the accounts of some area pioneers, it was Wright himself who gave the settlement its name, when a local observed him sift the soil and remark, "this is mellow land".

In 1909, a daughter was born to J. R. Loftus and his wife, the first baby to be born in Meloland. The post office closed in 1911. The population was listed as 10 in 1910, 20 in 1920 and 1930, 15 in 1940, and 50 in 1965.

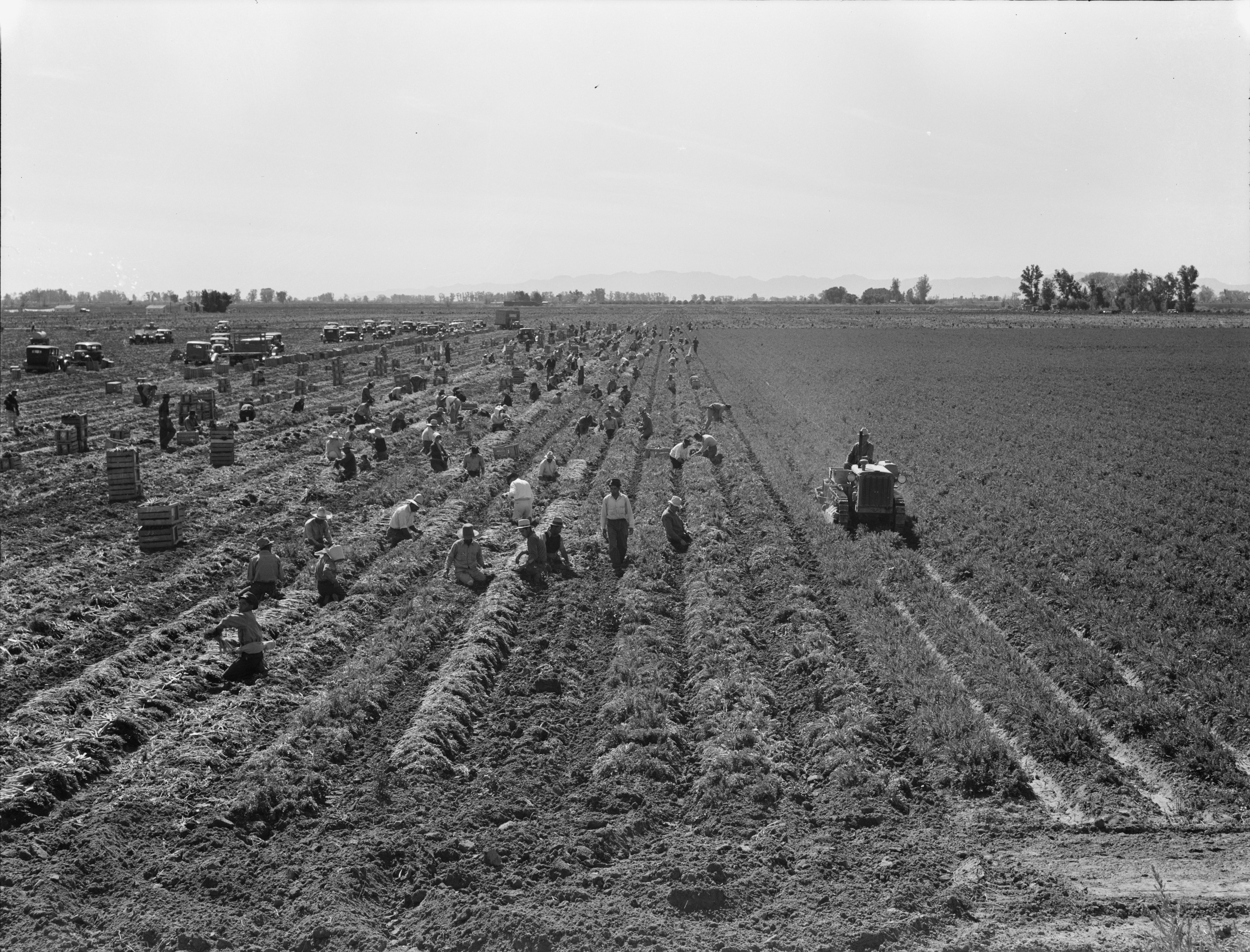
Agriculture near Meloland, 1939. Photo by Dorothea Lange.

The University of California Agriculture and Natural Resources's Desert Research and Extension Center is located at Meloland, and has been operating there since 1912.
