= Westmorland Union Elementary School District =

School district in California, United States

Address
- 200 South C Street Westmorland, California, 92281; United States

District information
- Type: Public
- Grades: K–8
- Superintendent: Richard Cordero
- NCES District ID: 0642180

Students and staff
- Students: 369
- Teachers: 20.0 (FTE)
- Staff: 32.5 (FTE)
- Student–teacher ratio: 18.45:1
- District mascot: Roadrunner

Other information
- Website: www.wued.org

Westmorland Union Elementary School District is a school district serving students in grades K-8 in Imperial County, California. The current superintendent is Richard Cordero. Linda Morse served as superintendent in 2011. The district's mascot is the Roadrunner, and had 402 students enrolled in 2019.
