= Salton Sea Beach, California =

Salton Sea Beach
- Unincorporated community Census-designated place
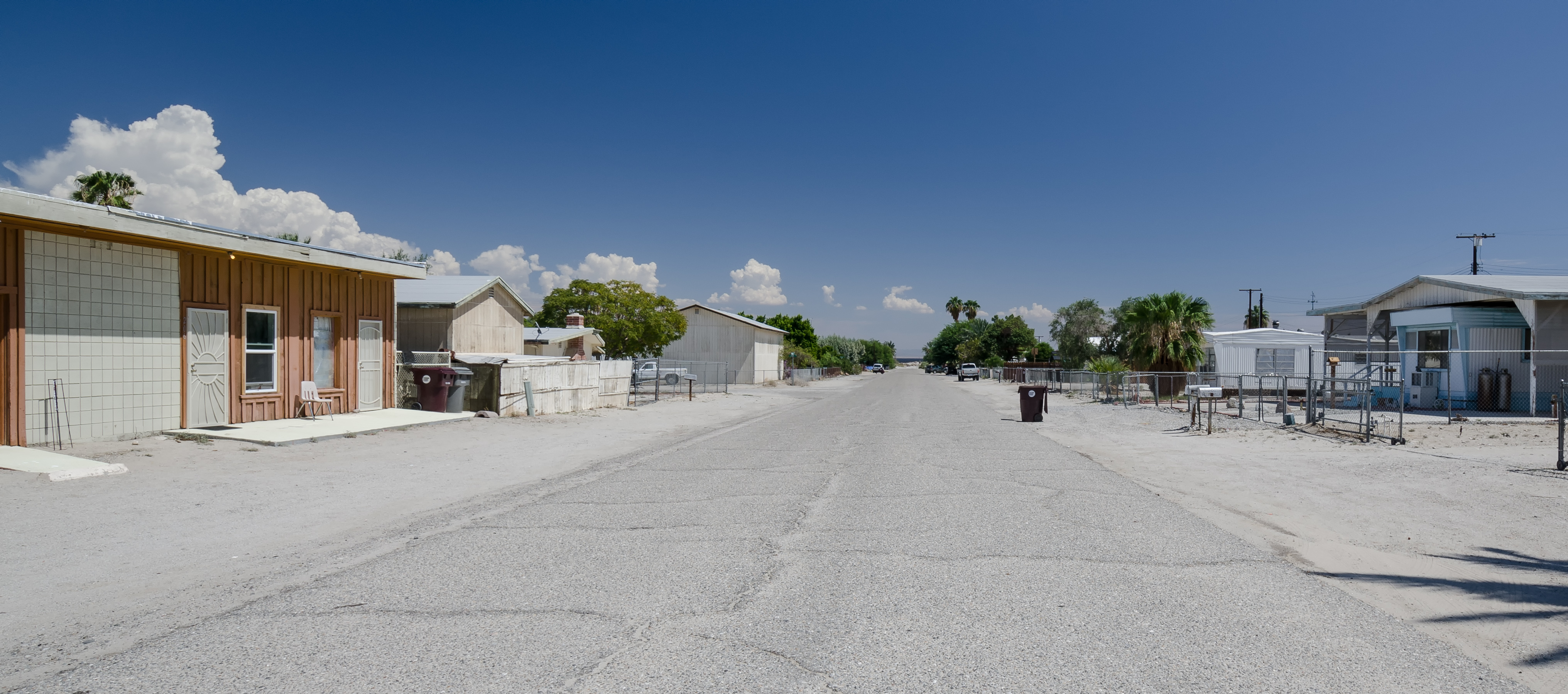
- Housings at Coachella Avenue

- Location in Imperial County and the state of California

- Location in the United States
- Coordinates: 33°22′30″N 116°00′43″W
- Country: United States
- State: California
- County: Imperial

Area
  - Total: 0.301 sq mi (0.780 km^{2})
  - Land: 0.301 sq mi (0.780 km^{2})
  - Water: 0 sq mi (0 km^{2}) 0%
- Elevation: −217 ft (−66 m)

Population (2020)
  - Total: 508
  - Density: 1,690/sq mi (651/km^{2})
- Time zone: UTC-8 (Pacific (PST))
  - Summer (DST): UTC-7 (PDT)
- ZIP code: 92274
- Area codes: 442/760
- FIPS code: 06-64308
- GNIS feature IDs: 1661370, 2409243

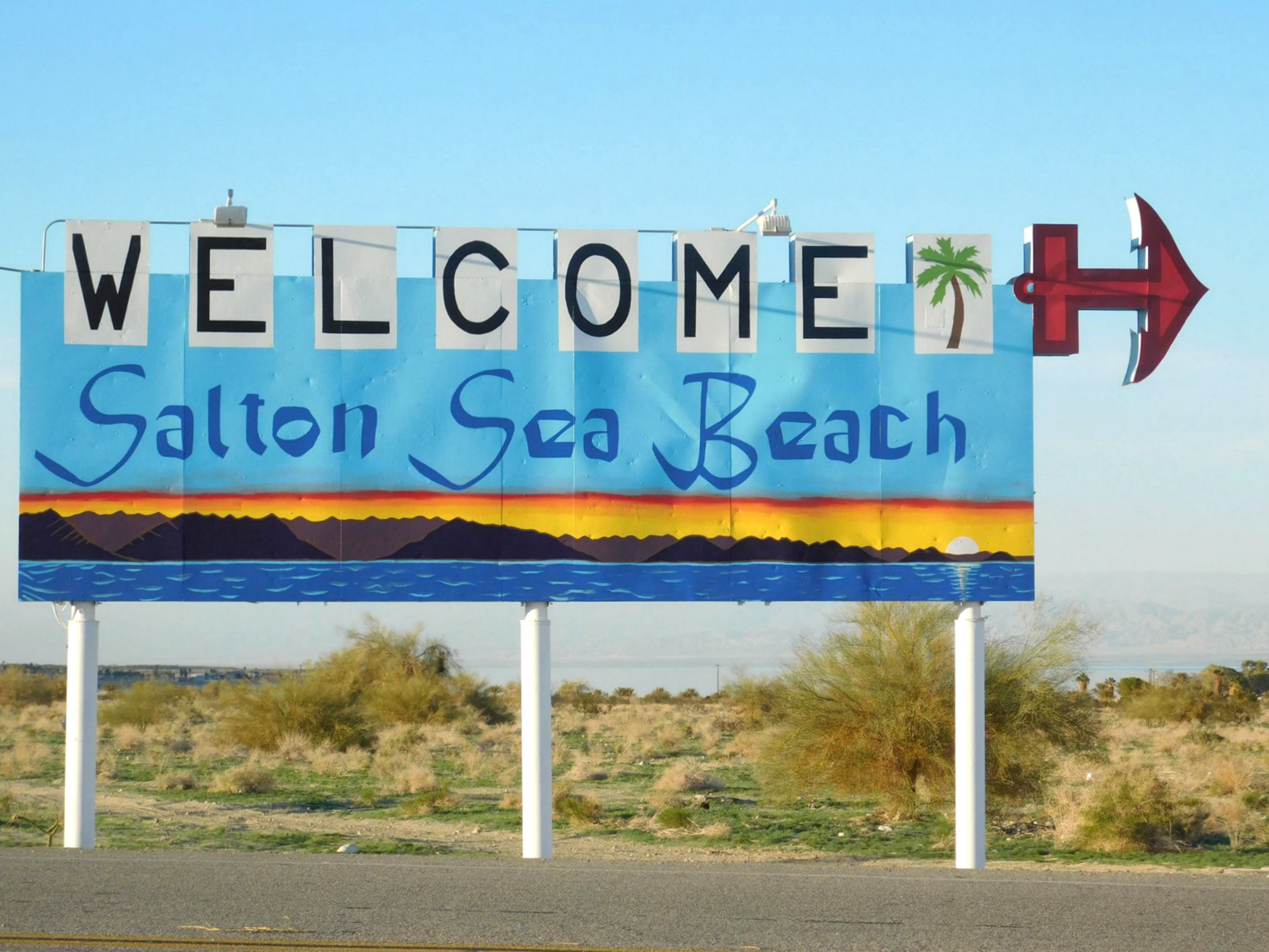
The newly restored "Welcome to Salton Sea Beach" sign

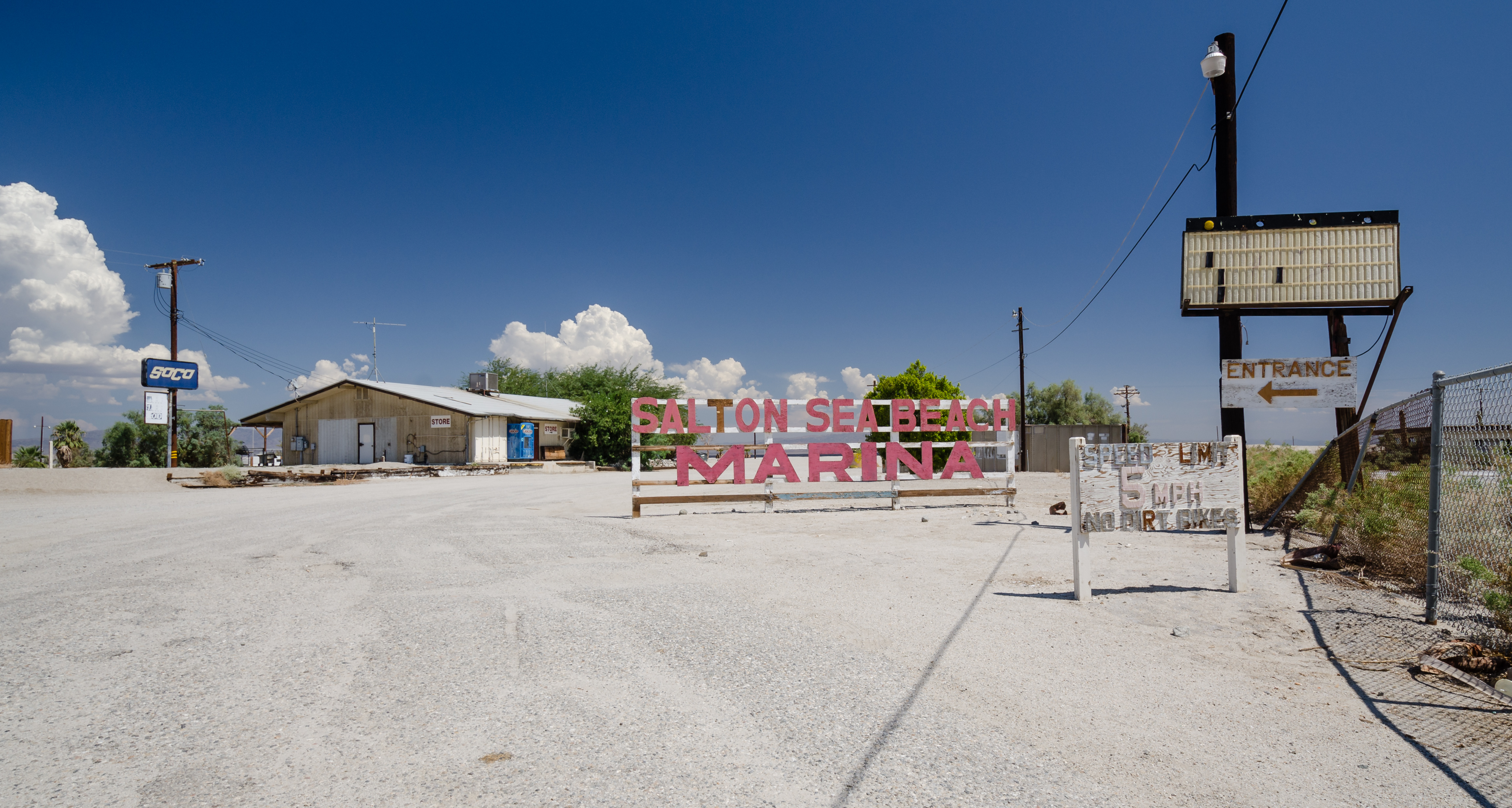
Parking lot of former Salton Sea Beach Marina

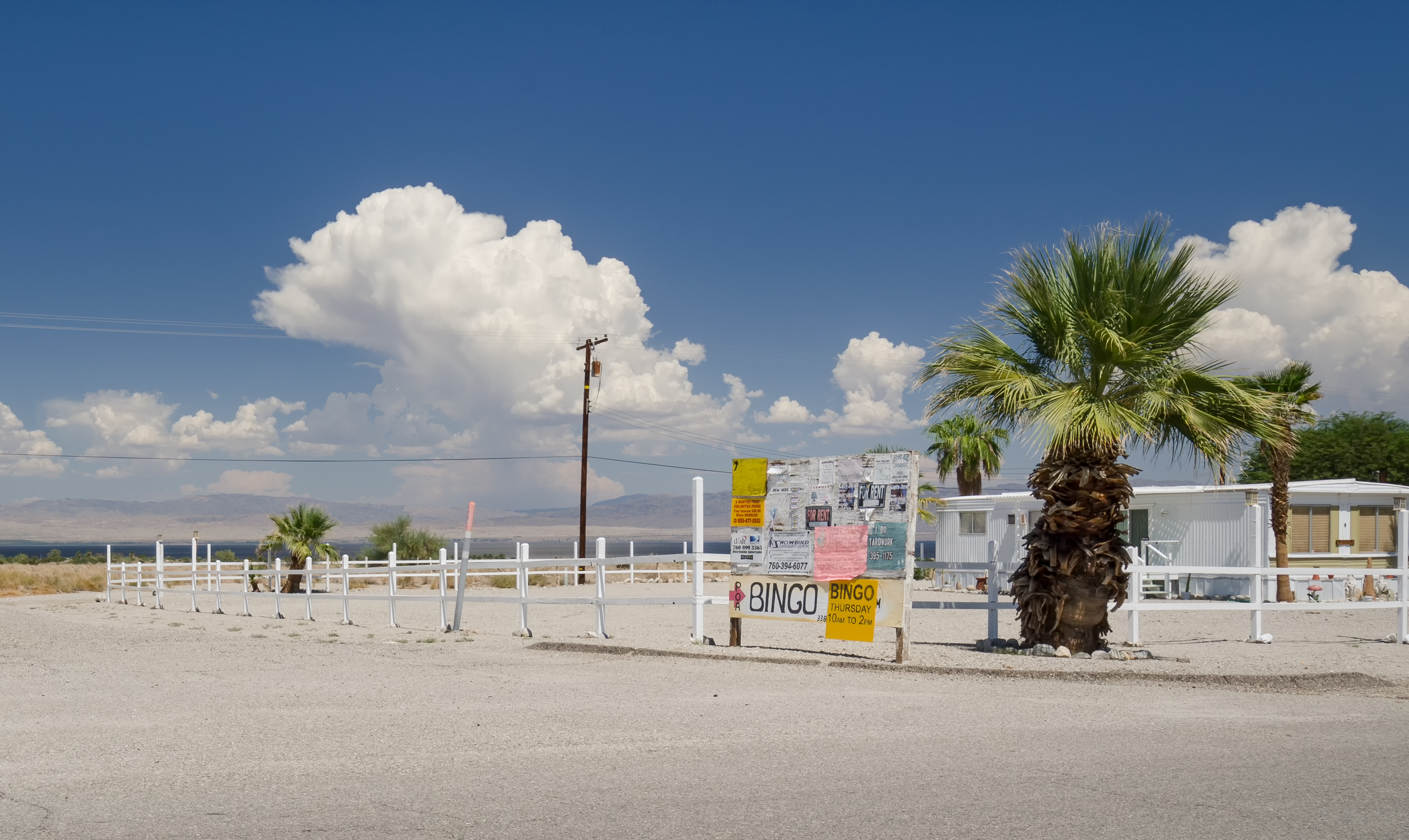
Blackboard on Brawley Avenue at the entry of Salton Sea Beach

Salton Sea Beach is a census-designated place (CDP) in Imperial County, California, located 2.5 miles (4 km) southeast of Desert Shores. The population was 508 at the 2020 census, up from 422 at the 2010 census, up from 392 at the 2000 census. It is part of the El Centro, California Metropolitan Statistical Area. It was the location of the Naval Auxiliary Air Station Salton Sea.

== Geography ==
Salton Sea Beach is located along the western shore of the Salton Sea, to the north of Salton City and to the south of Desert Shores along California State Route 86. The Salton Sea has an extremely high salinity level and is surrounded by salt flats and desert terrains.

== History ==
Salton Sea Beach was established during the 20th century and served a small community along the Salton Sea. The Salton Sea was created in 1905 when the Colorado River flooded into the Salton Basin. Since the mid-1900s, this area has attracted visitors for fishing and boating. Increased salinity and other environmental changes have caused a decrease in tourism and development. These environmental changes have also affected wildlife and contributed to air quality issues caused by dust from exposed lakebeds.

== Recreation ==
Salton Sea Beach has supported a variety of recreational activities, including fishing, boating, and camping. The shoreline and nearby parks were popular tourist destinations, attracting many visitors; however, due to environmental changes, recreational use declined significantly over time.

== Demographics ==
Historical population
Census	Pop.	Note	%±
2000	392		—
2010	422		7.7%
2020	508		20.4%
U.S. Decennial Census; 1860–1870 1880-1890; 1900 1910 1920; 1930 1940 1950; 1960 1970 1980; 1990 2000 2010

Salton Sea Beach first appeared as a census-designated place in the 2000 U.S. census.

=== 2020 ===
The 2020 United States census reported that Salton Sea Beach had a population of 508. The population density was 1,687.7 inhabitants per square mile (651.6/km^{2}). The racial makeup of Salton Sea Beach was 193 (38.0%) White, 2 (0.4%) African American, 13 (2.6%) Native American, 2 (0.4%) Asian, 2 (0.4%) Pacific Islander, 199 (39.2%) from other races, and 97 (19.1%) from two or more races. Hispanic or Latino of any race were 359 persons (70.7%).

The whole population lived in households. There were 174 households, out of which 62 (35.6%) had children under the age of 18 living in them, 85 (48.9%) were married-couple households, 6 (3.4%) were cohabiting couple households, 34 (19.5%) had a female householder with no partner present, and 49 (28.2%) had a male householder with no partner present. 46 households (26.4%) were one person, and 18 (10.3%) were one person aged 65 or older. The average household size was 2.92. There were 116 families (66.7% of all households).

The age distribution was 142 people (28.0%) under the age of 18, 43 people (8.5%) aged 18 to 24, 104 people (20.5%) aged 25 to 44, 125 people (24.6%) aged 45 to 64, and 94 people (18.5%) who were 65 years of age or older. The median age was 35.8 years. For every 100 females, there were 98.4 males.

There were 300 housing units at an average density of 996.7 units per square mile (384.8 units/km^{2}), of which 174 (58.0%) were occupied. Of these, 107 (61.5%) were owner-occupied, and 67 (38.5%) were occupied by renters.

=== 2010 ===
The 2010 United States census reported that Salton Sea Beach had a population of 422. The population density was 1,400.9 inhabitants per square mile (540.9/km^{2}). The racial makeup of Salton Sea Beach was 309 (73.2%) White, 6 (1.4%) African American, 4 (0.9%) Native American, 2 (0.5%) Asian, 2 (0.5%) Pacific Islander, 82 (19.4%) from other races, and 17 (4.0%) from two or more races. Hispanic or Latino of any race were 229 persons (54.3%).

The census reported that 422 people (100% of the population) lived in households and none were institutionalized or in non-institutionalized group quarters.

There were 177 households, of which 44 (24.9%) had children under the age of 18 living in them, 67 (37.9%) were opposite-sex married couples living together, 14 (7.9%) had a female householder with no husband present, 13 (7.3%) had a male householder with no wife present. There were 8 (4.5%) unmarried opposite-sex partnerships and 3 (1.7%) same-sex married couples or partnerships. 74 households (41.8%) were made up of individuals, and 46 (26.0%) had someone living alone who was 65 years of age or older. The average household size was 2.38. There were 94 families (53.1% of all households); the average family size was 3.36.

109 people (25.8%) were under the age of 18, 41 (9.7%) aged 18 to 24, 71 (16.8%) aged 25 to 44, 93 (22.0%) aged 45 to 64 and 108 (25.6%) were 65 years of age or older. The median age was 40.0. For every 100 females, there were 128.1 males. For every 100 females age 18 and over, there were 118.9 males.

There were 338 housing units at an average density of 1,122.0 per square mile (433.2/km^{2}), of which 177 were occupied, of which 125 (70.6%) were owner-occupied and 52 (29.4%) were occupied by renters. The homeowner vacancy rate was 3.4%; the rental vacancy rate was 12.9%. 304 people (72.0% of the population) lived in owner-occupied housing units and 118 people (28.0%) lived in rental housing units.

=== 2000 ===
At the 2000 census, the median household income was $13,664 and the median family income was $14,457. Males had a median income of $33,750 and females $17,031. The per capita income was $17,252. About 31.2% of families and 33.4% of the population were below the poverty line, including 58.3% of those under age 18 and 4.6% of those age 65 or over.

== Government ==
In the California State Legislature, Salton Sea Beach is in the 18th senatorial district, represented by Democrat Steve Padilla, and the 36th Assembly district, represented by Republican Jeff Gonzalez.

Federally, Salton Sea Beach is in California's 25th congressional district, represented by Democrat Raul Ruiz.

Water service is provided by the Coachella Valley Water District.

== See also ==
- Outline of the Salton Sea
- San Diego–Imperial, California
- El Centro Metropolitan Area
