= Salton (surname) =

Salton is a surname. Notable people with the surname include:

- Alexander Salton (1869–1916), Australian rules football umpire
- Basei Marzia Salton (born 1997), Italian cyclist
- Darren Salton (born 1972), Scottish footballer
- Gerard Salton (1927–1995), American computer scientist
