= Salton Sea Airport =

- IATA: SAS; ICAO: KSAS; FAA LID: SAS

Summary
- Airport type: Public
- Owner: Burrtec Waste Industries
- Serves: Salton City, California
- Elevation AMSL: −84 ft / −26 m
- Coordinates: 33°14′28″N 115°57′09″W
- Interactive map of Salton Sea Airport

Runways
Direction	Length		Surface
Direction	ft	m	Surface
7/25	5,000	1,524	Gravel

Statistics (2023)
- Aircraft operations (year ending 4/30/2023): 350
- Source: Federal Aviation Administration

Salton Sea Airport (IATA: SAS, ICAO: KSAS, FAA LID: SAS) is a privately owned, public use airport located one nautical mile (2 km) southwest of the central business district of Salton City, across California State Highway 86 from the western border of the new community of Sea View Beach (formerly the Salton Sea Test Base B-1) and the Sea View Beach Dunes in Imperial County, California, United States.

== Facilities and aircraft ==
Salton Sea Airport covers an area of 208 acres (84 ha) at an elevation of 84 feet (26 m) below mean sea level. It has one runway designated 7/25 with a gravel surface measuring 5,000 by 75 feet (1,524 x 23 m).

For the 12-month period ending April 30, 2023, the airport had 350 general aviation aircraft operations, an average of 29 per month.
