= Ogilby, California =

- Ghost town
- Location in California
- Coordinates: 32°49′01″N 114°50′20″W
- Country: United States
- State: California
- County: Imperial County
- Founded: 1877
- Elevation: 364 ft (111 m)
- Area codes: 442/760
- FIPS code: 06-53420
- GNIS feature ID: 252950

Ogilby (formerly, Oglesby) is a ghost town in Imperial County, California, United States. Ogilby is located on the Southern Pacific Railroad 42 miles (68 km) east of El Centro, and 3.8 miles (6.1 km) north of Interstate 8 on County Road S34. The name is official for federal use, and a feature ID number of 252950 has been assigned. Ogilby is defined by the US Geological Survey as a populated place at 356 feet (109 m) AMSL elevation. NAD27 latitude and longitude are listed at 32°49′01″N 114°50′20″W on the "Ogilby, California" 7.5-minute quadrangle (map). It is included in the Imperial County Air Pollution Control District. It lies at an elevation of 364 feet (111 m).

== History ==
Ogilby was founded as a railroad stop for the Southern Pacific in 1877, and served as a supply point for the mining communities of Glamis, Hedges, and Tumco. The Oglesby post office operated for part of 1880. The Ogilby post office operated from 1890 to 1895, moving in 1892, and from 1898 to 1942. The name honors E.R. Ogilby, mine promoter. Parts of the second Plank Road were assembled in Ogilby. The town was abandoned by 1961.

== Nearby ==
Ogilby lies along the Union Pacific Railroad tracks east of Algodones Dunes.

Ogilby Hills, to the southeast, have summits in the 600–800-foot (180–240 m) AMSL range.

A Catholic cemetery exists to the south and west of the railroad line at 32°48′55″N 114°50′20″W.

The closest city is Yuma, Arizona, at about 25 miles (40 km) driving distance.

The international border with Mexico lies about 9 miles (14 km) in a straight line to the south. The Arizona state line lies about 7 miles (11 km) southeast.

== Communications ==
There is no ZIP code assigned to Ogilby. The area lies within area code 760.

== Government ==
In the California State Legislature, Ogilby is in the 40th senatorial district, represented by Republican Brian Jones, and in the 56th Assembly district, represented by Democrat Lisa Calderon.

In the United States House of Representatives, Ogilby is in California's 51st congressional district, represented by Democrat Sara Jacobs.

== See also ==
- Old Plank Road
- Winterhaven, California
- Glamis, California
