= Cargo Muchacho Mountains =

Landform in Imperial County, California

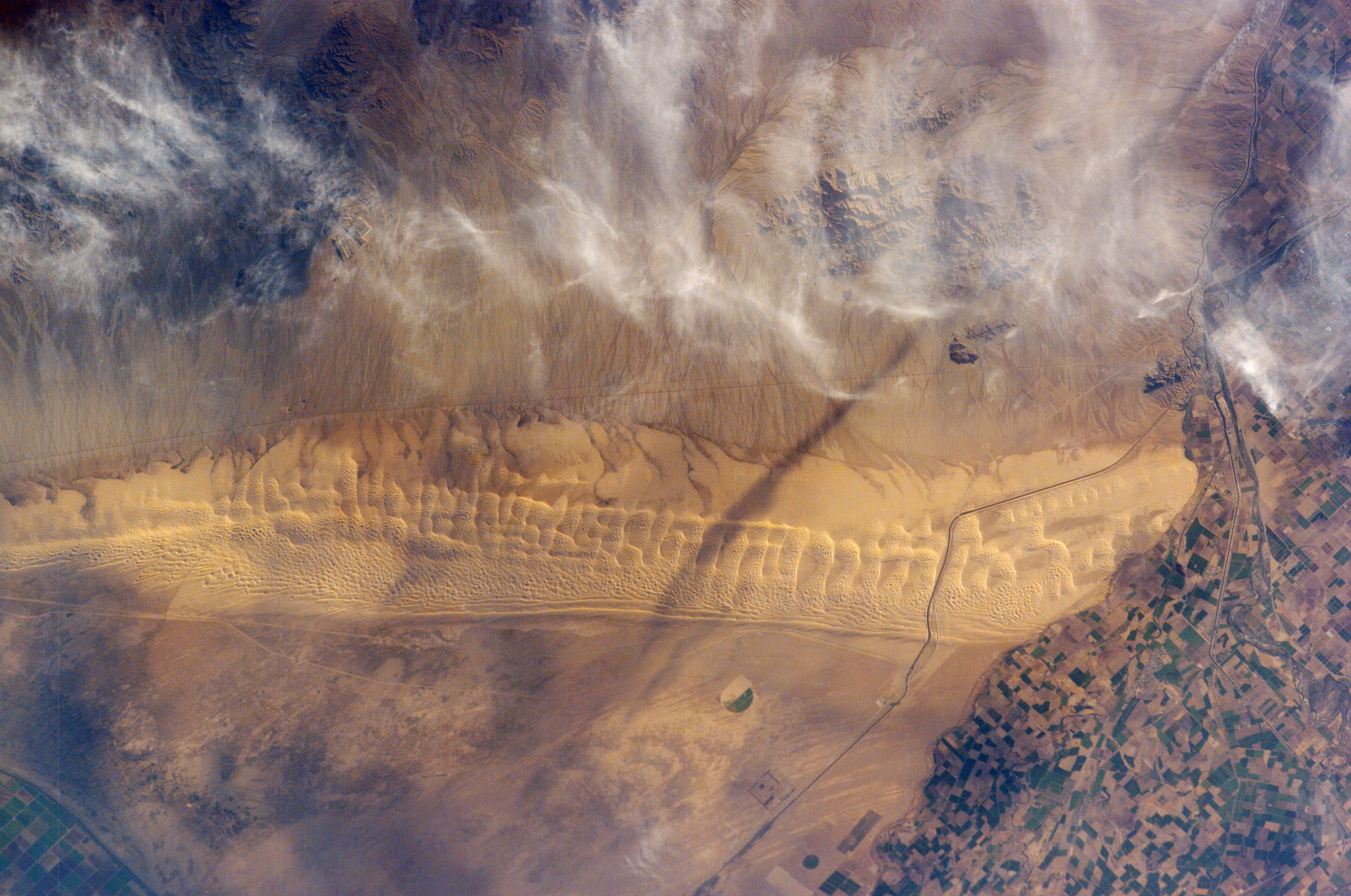
- Cargo Muchacho Mountains and the Algodones Dunes from space. The mountain range is in the upper portion of the image, beneath the clouds (dunefield: ~13 x 65 mi)

Highest point
- Elevation: 2,219 ft (676 m); NAVD 88
- Coordinates: 32°53′34″N 114°47′54″W

Geography
- Location within California
- Country: United States
- State: California
- County: Imperial County
- Range coordinates: 32°52′5.159″N 114°46′48.854″W
- Topo map: USGS Ogilby

The Cargo Muchacho Mountains are located in the southeast Colorado Desert in the Lower Colorado River Valley, in Imperial County, California in the United States. Much of the range's geology was described by the geologist John T. Dillon.

== Geography ==
The range lies in a northwest-southeasterly direction, southeast of the Imperial Valley and northwest of the Colorado River and Yuma, AZ–Winterhaven, CA. The range lies south and southeast of the Chocolate Mountains and east of the Algodones Dunes. Pilot Knob is a volcanic plug formed landmark peak to the south of the range.

The mountains are home to the American Girl Mine, and the Golden Bee and Cargo mines. The All American Canal passes to the south of the range.
