= Imperial County, California =

County in California, United States

Coordinates: 33.04°N 115.35°W

Imperial County
- County
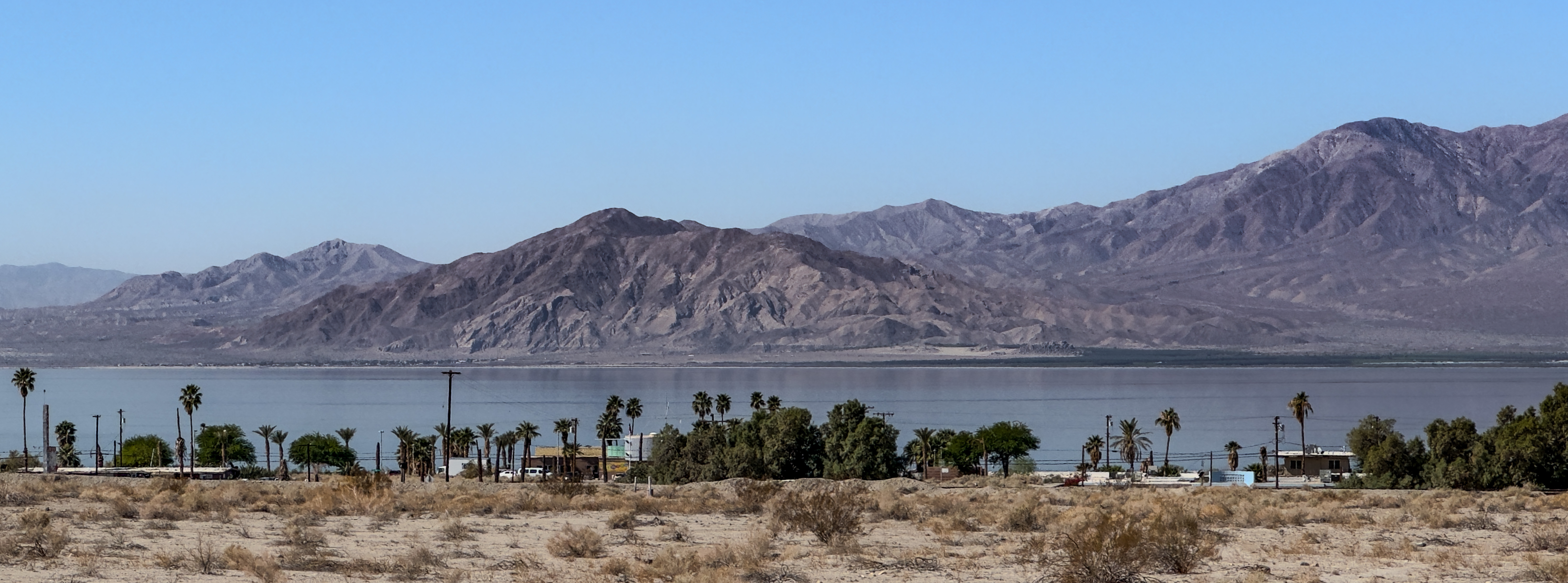
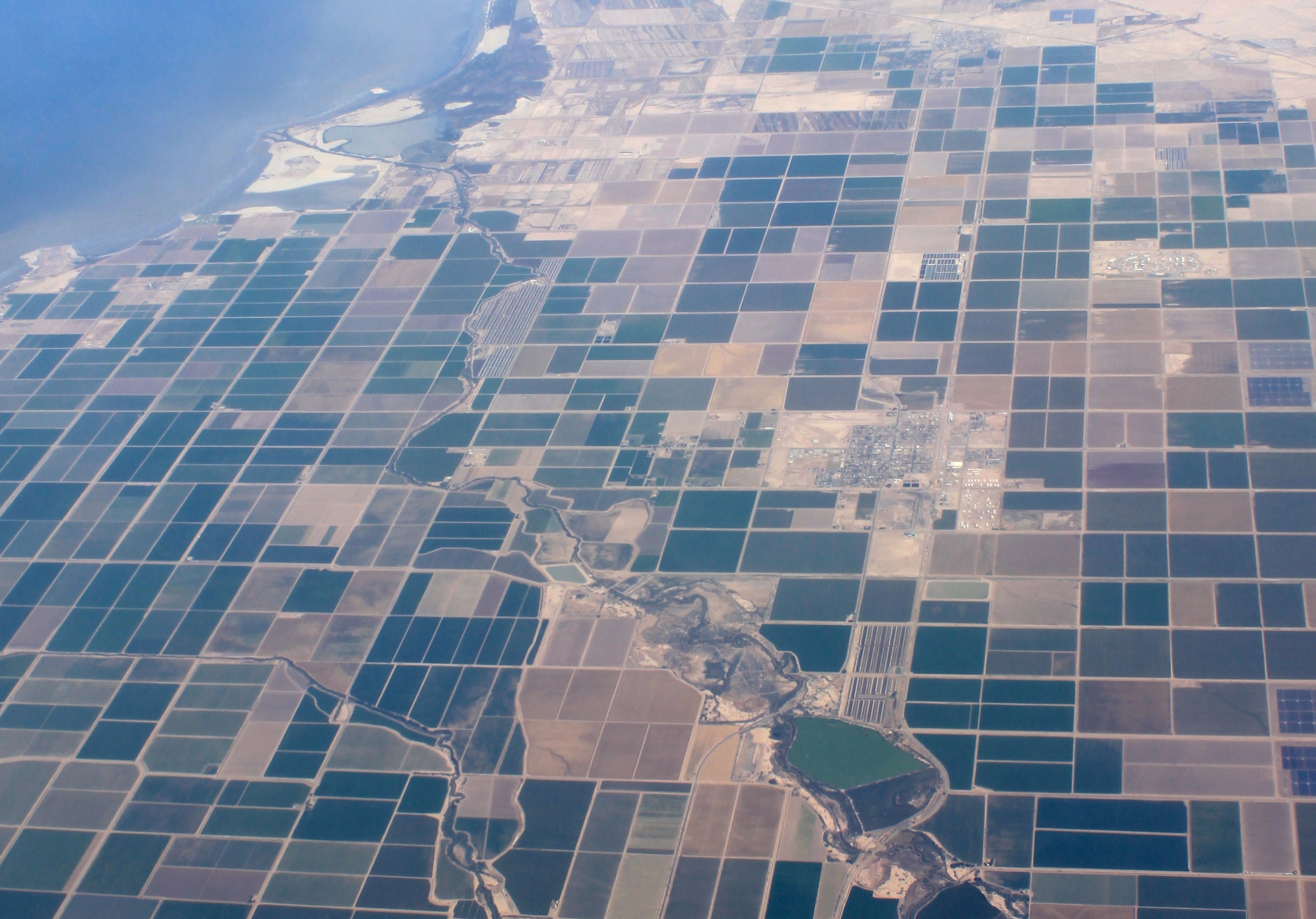
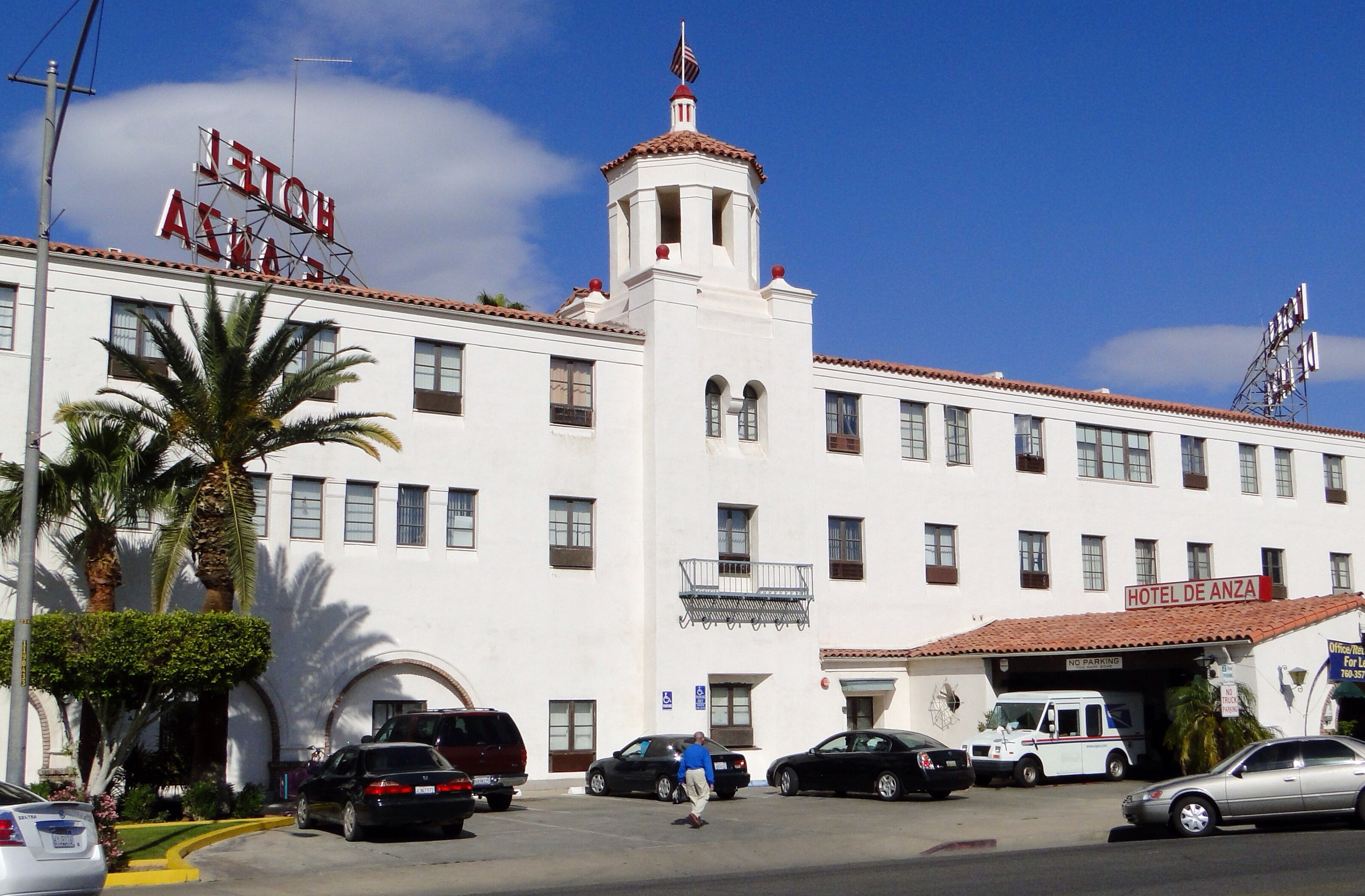
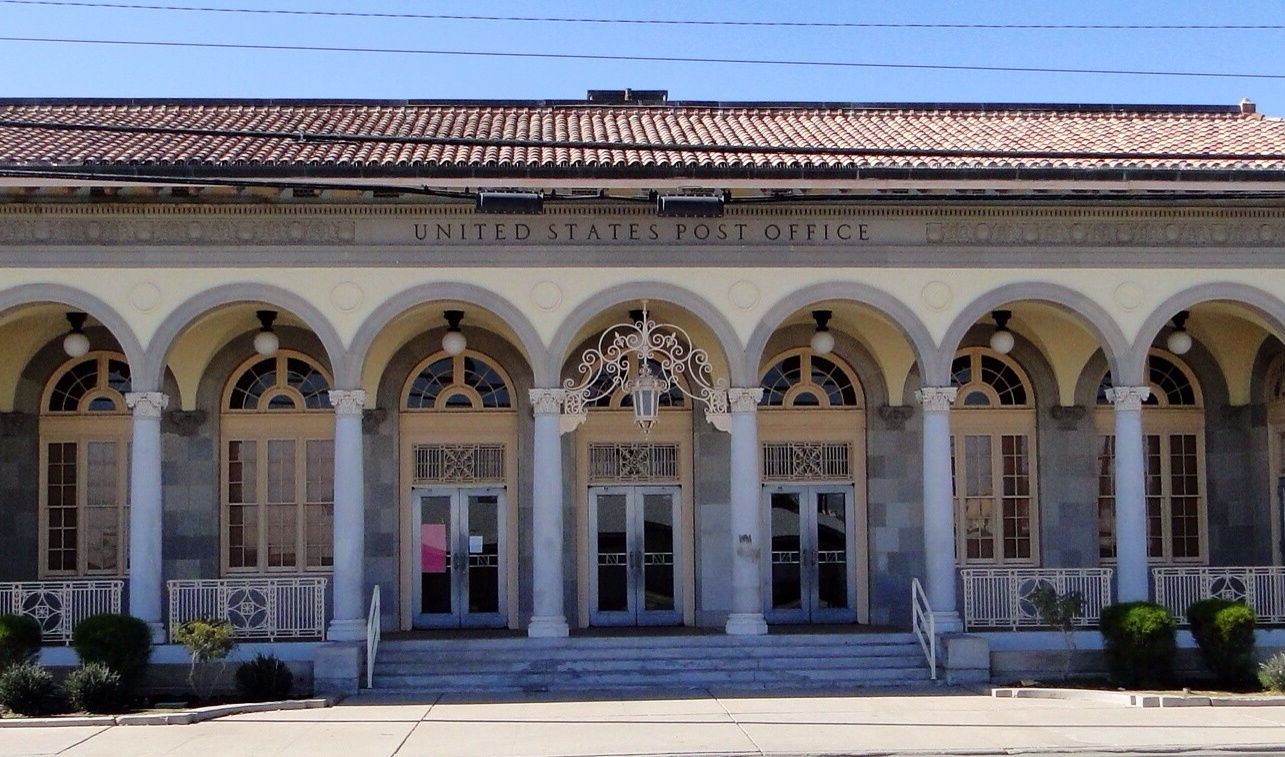
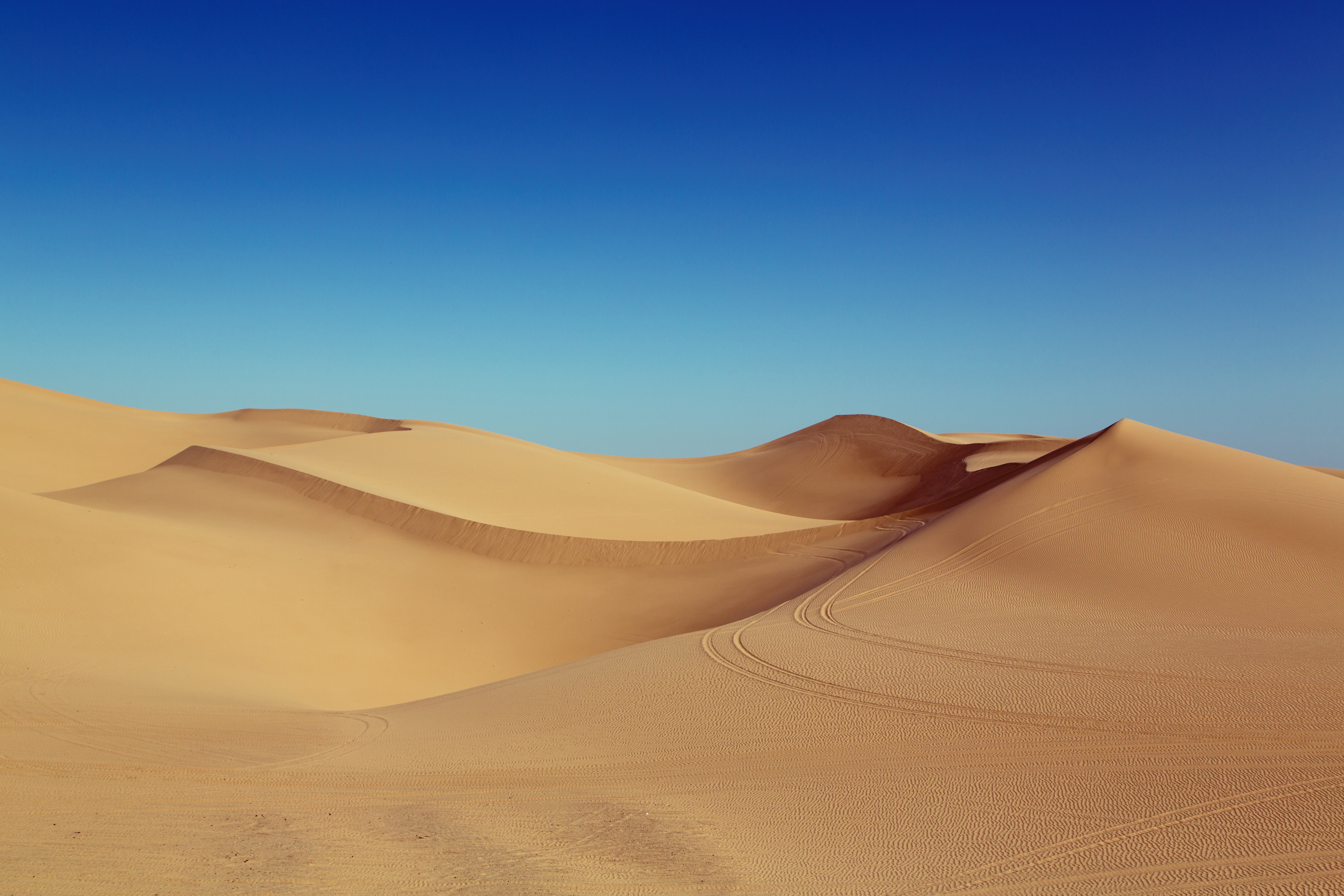
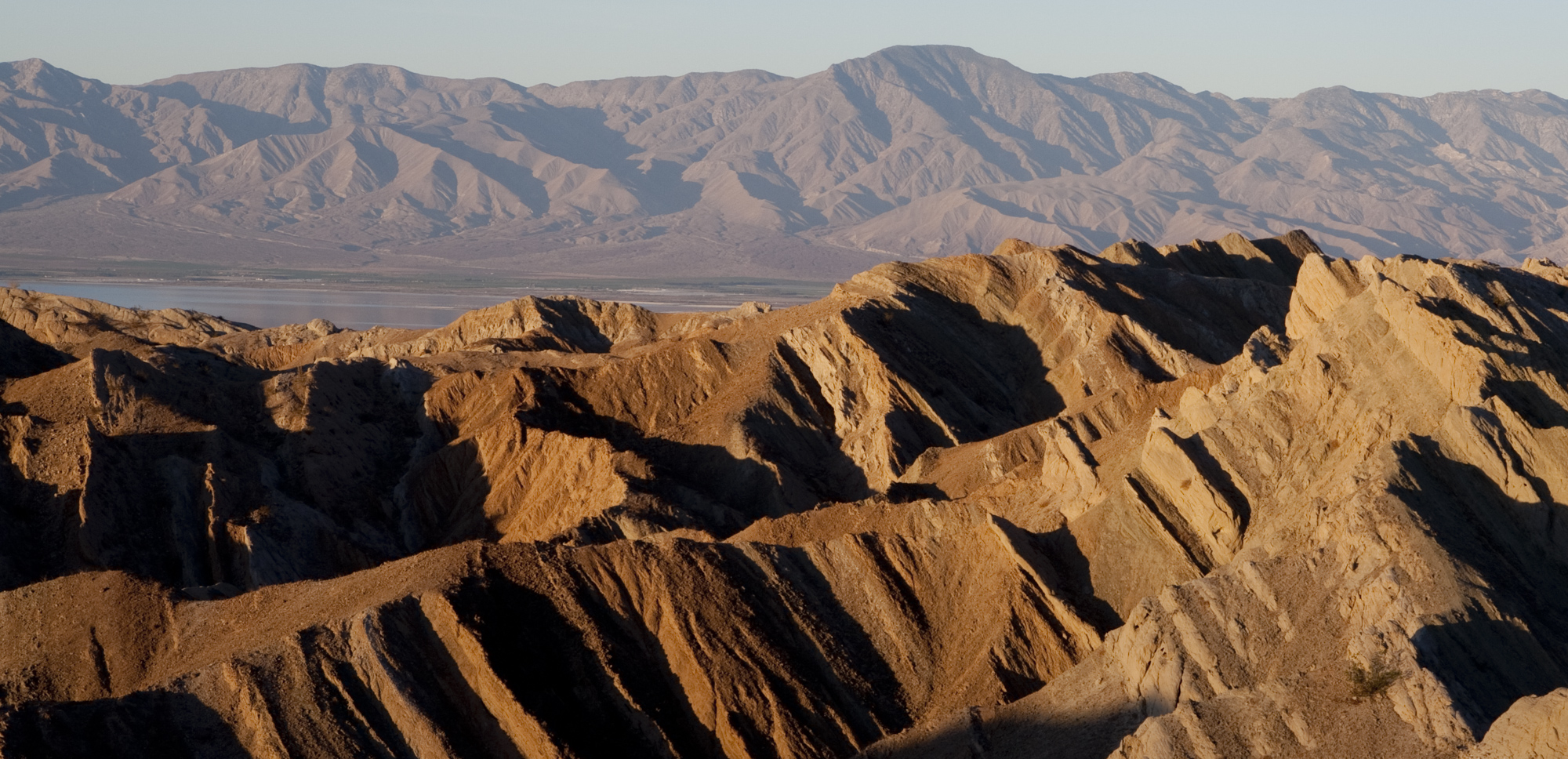
- Salton Sea Calipatria Calexico El Centro Algodones Dunes Santa Rosa Mountains

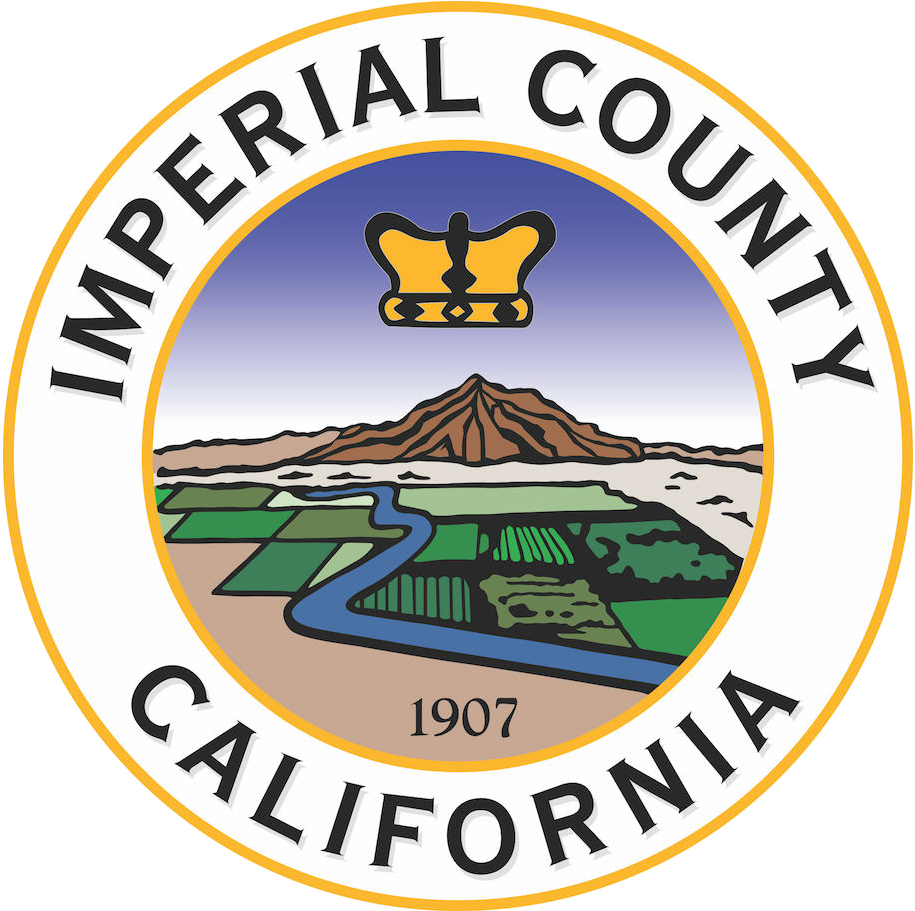
- Flag Seal
- Interactive map of Imperial County
- Location in the state of California
- Country: United States
- State: California
- Region: Californian Deserts
- Incorporated: August 7, 1907
- Named for: Imperial Valley, which was named after the Imperial Land Company
- County seat: El Centro
- Largest community: El Centro (population); Salton City (area)

Government
  - Type: Council–CEO
  - Body: Board of Supervisors
  - Chair: Margarita Peggy Price
  - Vice Chair: Martha Cardenas-Singh
  - Board of Supervisors: Supervisors: Jesus Eduardo Escobar; Martha Cardenas-Singh; Margarita Peggy Price; Ryan E. Kelley; John Hawk
  - County executive officer: Dr. Kathleen Lang

Area
  - Total: 4,482 sq mi (11,610 km^{2})
  - Land: 4,177 sq mi (10,820 km^{2})
  - Water: 305 sq mi (790 km^{2})
- Highest elevation: 4,552 ft (1,387 m)
- Lowest elevation: −232 ft (−71 m)

Population (April 1, 2020)
  - Total: 179,702
  - Estimate (2025): 181,411 ▲
  - Density: 43.02/sq mi (16.61/km^{2})

GDP
  - Total: $11.064 billion (2022)
- Time zone: UTC−8 (Pacific Time Zone)
  - Summer (DST): UTC−7 (Pacific Daylight Time)
- Area codes: 442/760
- FIPS code: 06-025
- GNIS feature ID: 277277
- Congressional district: 25th
- Website: imperialcounty.org

Imperial County is located on the southeast border of the U.S. state of California. As of the 2020 census, the population was 179,702, ranking as the least populous county in Southern California. The county seat and largest city is El Centro. Imperial is the most recent California county to be established, as it was created in 1907 out of the eastern half of San Diego County.

Imperial County is located in the far southeast of California, in the Imperial Valley. It borders San Diego County to the west, Riverside County to the north, the U.S. state of Arizona to the east and the Mexican state of Baja California to the south. It includes the El Centro metropolitan statistical area and is part of the Southern California border region, the smallest but most economically diverse region in the state.

Although this region is a desert, with high temperatures and low average rainfall of 3 inches (76 mm) per year, the economy is strongly based on agriculture. This is supported by irrigation, with water supplied wholly from the Colorado River via the All-American Canal.

The Imperial Valley straddles the border between the United States and Mexico. Imperial County is strongly influenced by Mexican culture. Approximately 85% of the county's population is Hispanic, with the vast majority being of Mexican origin. It has the highest proportion of Hispanics of any county in California. The remainder of the population is predominantly non-Hispanic white, in addition to smaller African American, Native American, and Asian minorities.

== History ==
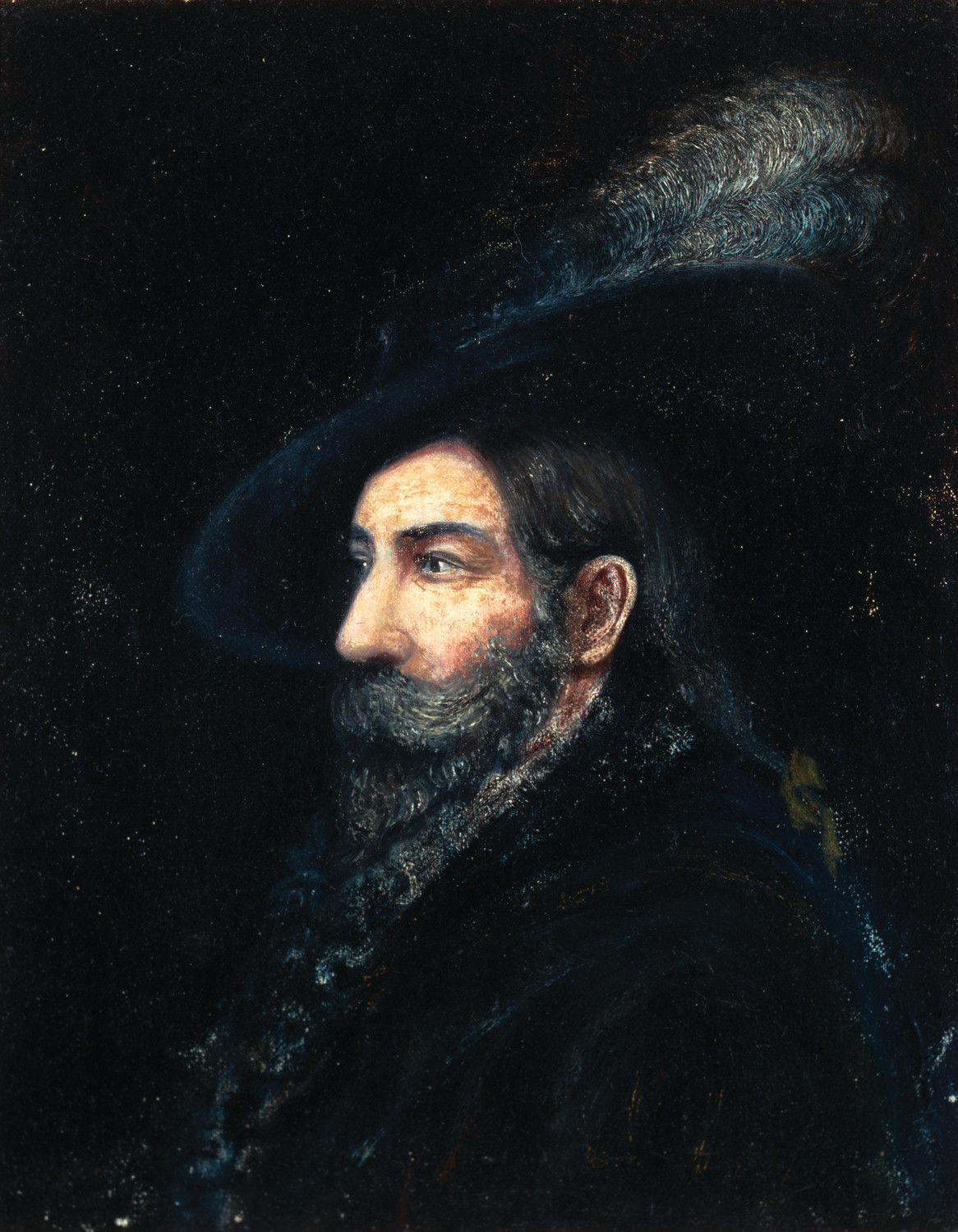
Juan Bautista de Anza's noted expedition passed through the area in 1775.

The indigenous peoples of the area were the Quechan along the Colorado River, the Kamia-Kumeyaay west of the Quechan, and the Cahuilla to the north.

Spanish explorer Melchor Díaz was one of the first Europeans to visit the area of the Imperial Valley in 1540. The explorer Juan Bautista de Anza also explored the area in 1776. The indigenous peoples in the county were also engaged in an armed regional conflict, with the Quechan leading a coalition with the Kumeyaay against the Maricopa-led coalition with the Cahuilla, Cocopah, and other tribes in modern-day Arizona. Constant warfare would deny the Spanish explorers any overland access to Alta California, despite Spanish attempts to mediate the conflict.

Decades later, after the Mexican–American War, the northern half of the valley was annexed in 1848 by the U.S., while the southern half remained under Mexican rule.

Following the war, another war would consume the region in 1850 after the Glanton Gang sabotaged Quechan ferry operators and mugged a local Quechan chief. This would lead toward the start of the Yuma War, with a Quechan-led coalition of tribes against the US army and its indigenous allies in Baja California and Sonora. In the First Yuma War, the Quechan laid siege on Fort Yuma in 1851, and forced the American garrison there to abandon the fort. The Americans returned to the area in 1852 and subdued the Quechan by destroying their villages and farmland, and killed any warriors that resisted, leading to Quechan surrender to the US. The Second Yuma War would later see neighboring tribes erode much of the military advantages that the Quechan had left.

Small-scale settlement in natural aquifer areas had occurred in the early 19th century (the present-day site of Mexicali), but most permanent settlement occurred after 1900.

In 1905, torrential rainfall in the American Southwest caused the Colorado River (the only drainage for the region) to flood, including canals that had been built to irrigate the Imperial Valley. Since the valley is partially below sea level, the waters never fully receded, but collected in the Salton Sink in what is now called the Salton Sea.

Imperial County was formed in 1907 from the eastern portion of San Diego County. The county was named for Imperial Valley. This had been named for the Imperial Land Company, a subsidiary of the California Development Company, which at the turn of the 20th century had claimed the southern portion of the Colorado Desert for agriculture. The Imperial Land Company also owned extensive lands in Mexico (Baja California). Its objective was to develop commercial crop farming.

By 1910, the land company had managed to settle and develop thousands of farms on both sides of the border. The Mexican Revolution soon after severely disrupted the company's plans. Rival Mexican armies killed nearly 10,000 farmers and their families in northern Mexico. Many Mexicans did not feel it was safe to return until the 1920s; some chose to stay and establish roots in newly developed communities in the valley.

During the Great Depression and the Dust Bowl, the county attracted migrating "Okies" from drought-ridden farms on the plains by the need of migrant labor. More prosperous job-seekers also arrived from across the U.S. in the 1930s and 1940s. American entry into World War II stimulated the growth of jobs and need to expanded agriculture, and the All American Canal was completed from its source, the Colorado River, to Imperial Valley from 1948 to 1951. By the 1950 census, more than 50,000 residents lived in Imperial County alone, about 40 times the population of 1910. Most of the population was year-round, but would increase every winter by migrant laborers from Mexico. Until the 1960s, the farms in Imperial County provided substantial economic returns to the company and the valley.

During the Great Recession of 2008–11, El Centro had one of the highest unemployment rates (above 30–34%) in the U.S. In the early 2020s, Imperial ranks as one of California's poorest counties. It has a lower median household income than either the state or national medians.

== Sites of interest ==
=== Fort Yuma ===
Fort Yuma is located on the banks of the Colorado River in Winterhaven, California. First established after the end of the Mexican–American War in 1848, it was originally located in the bottoms near the Colorado River, less than 1 mile (1.6 km) below the mouth of the Gila River. It was to defend the newly settled community of Yuma, Arizona, on the other side of the Colorado River and the nearby Mexican border. In March 1851 the post was moved to a small elevation on the Colorado's west bank, opposite the present city of Yuma, Arizona, on the site of the former Mission Puerto de Purísima Concepción. This site had been occupied by Camp Calhoun, named for John C. Calhoun, established in 1849. Fort Yuma was established to protect the southern emigrant travel route to California and to attempt control of the Yuma Indians in the surrounding 100-mile (160 km) area.

=== Blue Angels ===
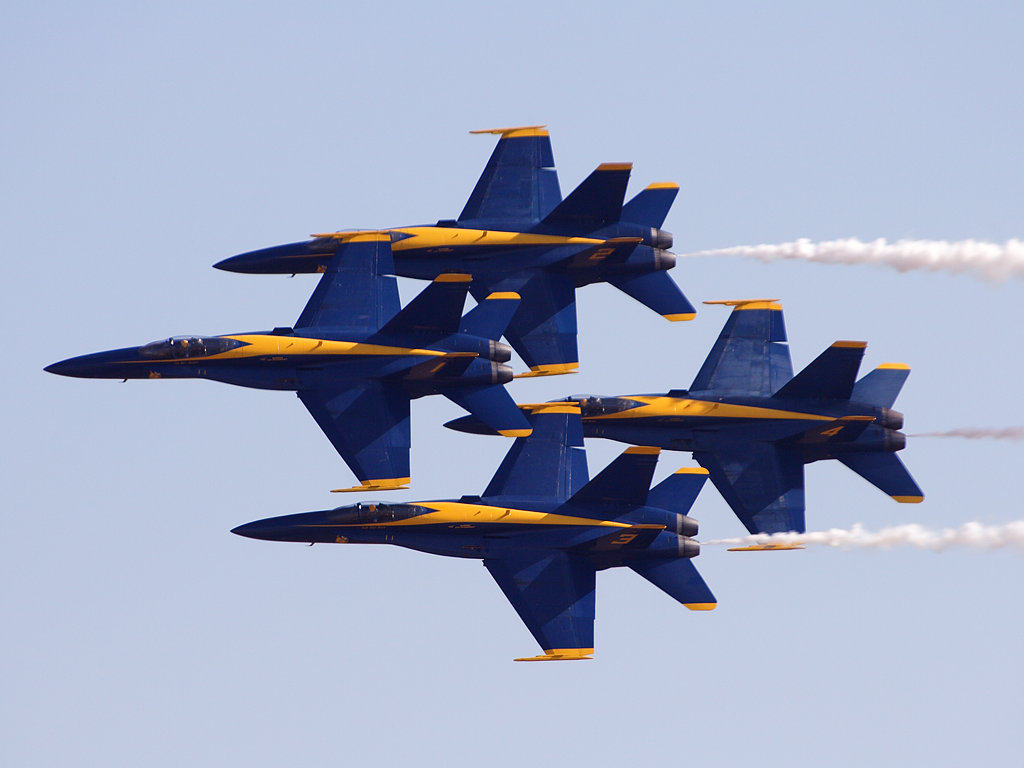
Blue Angels

NAF El Centro is the winter home of the U.S. Navy Flight Demonstration Squadron, The Blue Angels. NAF El Centro historically kicks off the Blue Angels' season with their first air show, traditionally held in March.

=== Imperial Valley Expo & Fairgrounds ===
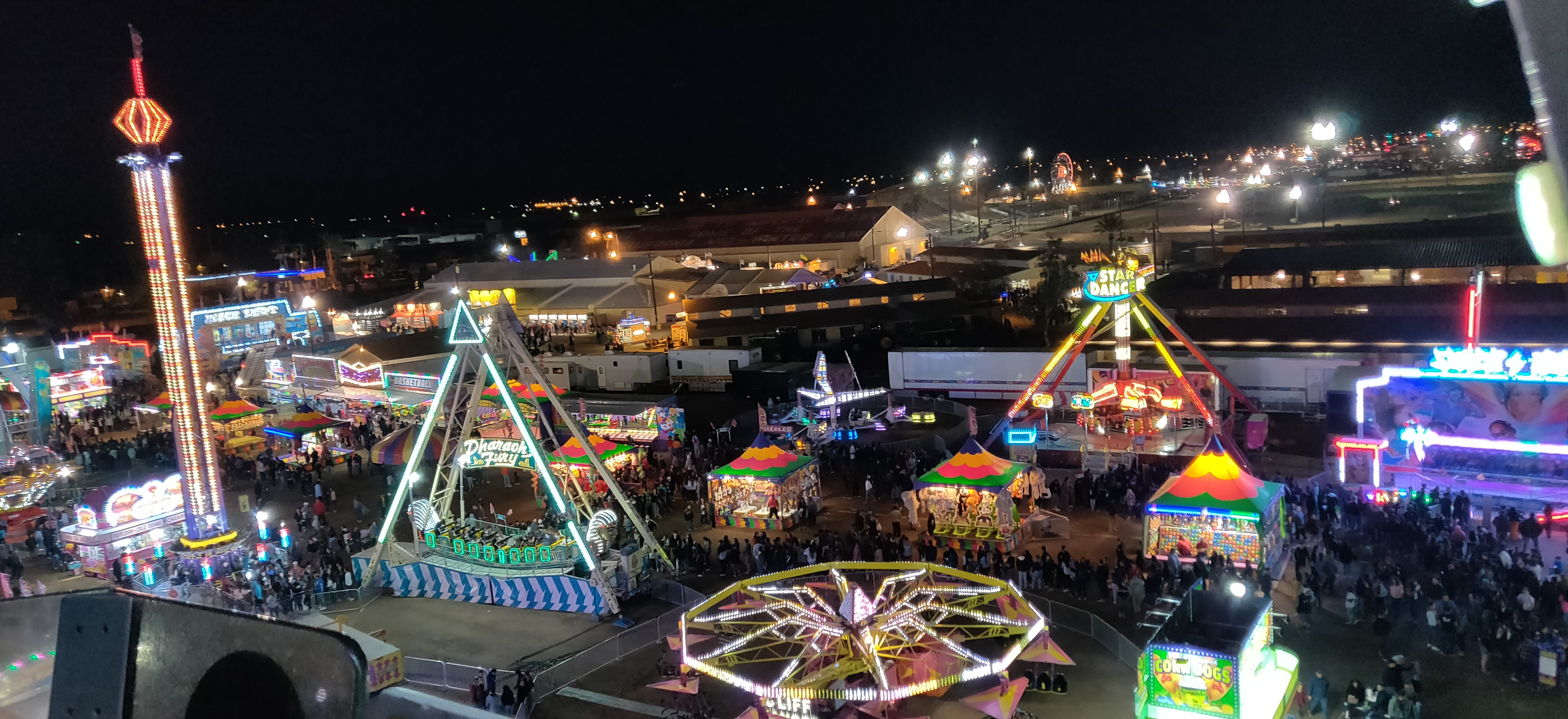
Mid-Winter Fair in Imperial, CA

The city of Imperial is home to the California Mid-Winter Fair and Fiesta which is the local county fair, held in late February to early March. It is also home to the Imperial Valley Speedway, a race track of 3/8 mile (600 m).

=== Algodones Sand Dunes ===
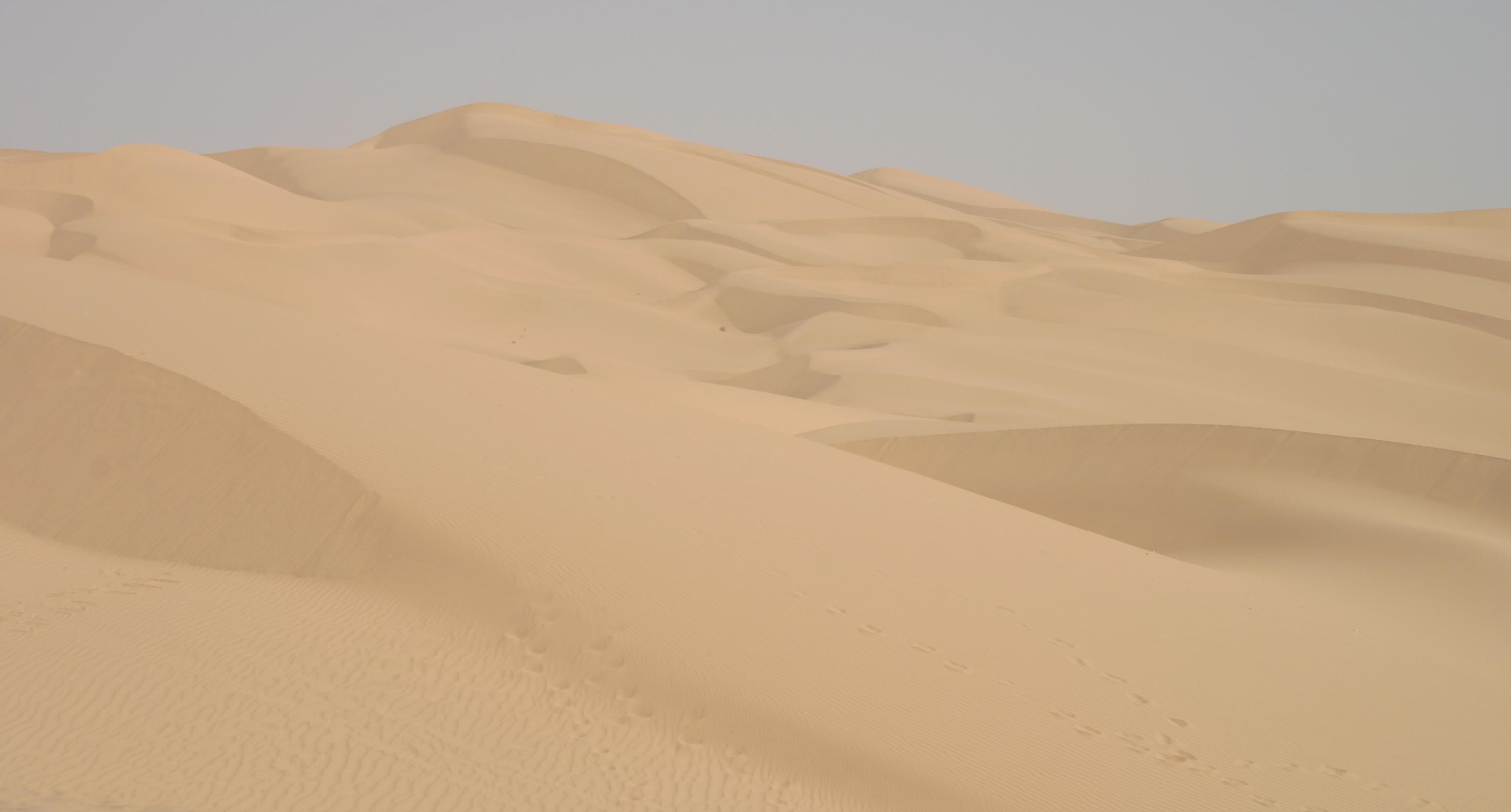
The Algodones Dunes

The name Algodones Dunes refers to the entire geographic feature, while the administrative designation for that portion managed by the Bureau of Land Management is the "Imperial Sand Dunes Recreation Area" (sometimes called the "Glamis Dunes"). The Algodones Sand Dunes are the largest mass of sand dunes in California. This dune system extends for more than 40 miles (64 km) along the eastern edge of the Imperial Valley agricultural region in a band averaging 5 miles (8 km) in width. A major east–west route of the Union Pacific railroad skirts the eastern edge. The dune system is divided into three areas. The northernmost area is known as Mammoth Wash. South of Mammoth Wash is the North Algodones Dunes Wilderness established by the 1994 California Desert Protection Act. This area is closed to motorized use and access is by hiking and horseback. The largest and most heavily used area begins at Highway 78 and continues south just past Interstate 8. The expansive dune formations offer picturesque scenery, a chance to view rare plants and animals, and a playground for ATV and off-roading enthusiasts. The dunes are also popular in film making and have been the site for movies such as Return of the Jedi.

=== Colorado River ===
The Colorado River runs through the southwestern United States and northwestern Mexico, approximately 1,450 miles (2,330 km) long, draining a part of the arid regions on the western slope of the Rocky Mountains. The natural course of the river flows from north of Grand Lake, Colorado, into the Gulf of California. For many months out of the year, however, no water actually flows from the United States to the gulf, due to human use. The river is a popular destination for water sports, including fishing, boating, water skiing, and jet skiing.

=== Salvation Mountain ===
Salvation Mountain is an artificial mountain north of Calipatria, California, near Slab City. It is made from adobe, straw, and paint. It was created by Leonard Knight to convey the message that "God Loves Everyone." Knight refused substantial donations of money and labor from supporters who wished to modify his message of universal love to favor or disfavor particular groups.

=== Anza-Borrego Desert State Park ===
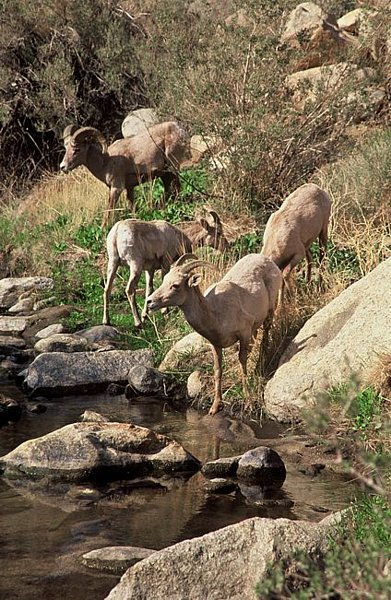
Bighorn sheep at Palm Canyon in Anza-Borrego State Park

Anza-Borrego Desert State Park, portions of which are located in Imperial County, is the largest state park in California. 500 miles (800 km) of dirt roads, twelve wilderness areas, and many more miles of hiking trails provide visitors with an unparalleled opportunity to experience the wonders of the Colorado Desert. The park's name is a combination of the last name of Spanish explorer Juan Bautista de Anza, and the Spanish word for bighorn sheep, borrego. The park features many sweeping vistas, washes (wadis), rocky outcrops, boulder-strewn hillsides, in addition to the vast expanses of sandy desert; in springtime (especially after periods of rain), these areas appear to change shape, as they come alive with blooming wildflowers, flowering and fruiting cacti and numerous other species of native flora. Fauna that visitors may also have the chance to see include the bobcat, coyote, golden eagle, kit fox, mule deer, mountain lion, red-tailed hawk and roadrunner, as well as the iconic desert subspecies of bighorn sheep (formerly more common, across the southwest U.S. and northern Mexico). Many varied reptile species call the area home, such as the banded gecko, chuckwalla, desert iguana, desert tortoise, desert sidewinder, gopher snake, kingsnake, red diamond rattlesnake and the rosy boa.

=== Fossil Canyon and Painted Gorge ===
Located near Ocotillo, California in the Coyote Mountains, Fossil Canyon (and the surrounding area) is a great place for rock-hounding and fossil hunting. The fossils here are not necessarily of dinosaurs; more commonly found are ancient oyster and seashell, coral, and other marine life from the prehistoric Miocene epoch, when the entire area was submerged as part of the Western Interior Seaway.

The Painted Gorge, located on the eastern side of the Coyote Mountains, consists of sedimentary, metamorphic and igneous rock; Heat and movement over time has created a diversity of shapes and colors. Shades such as dark ochre, iron-reds, royal purples, and mauves (mixed with dark browns/black) are visible in the rock formation.

=== Imperial NWR ===
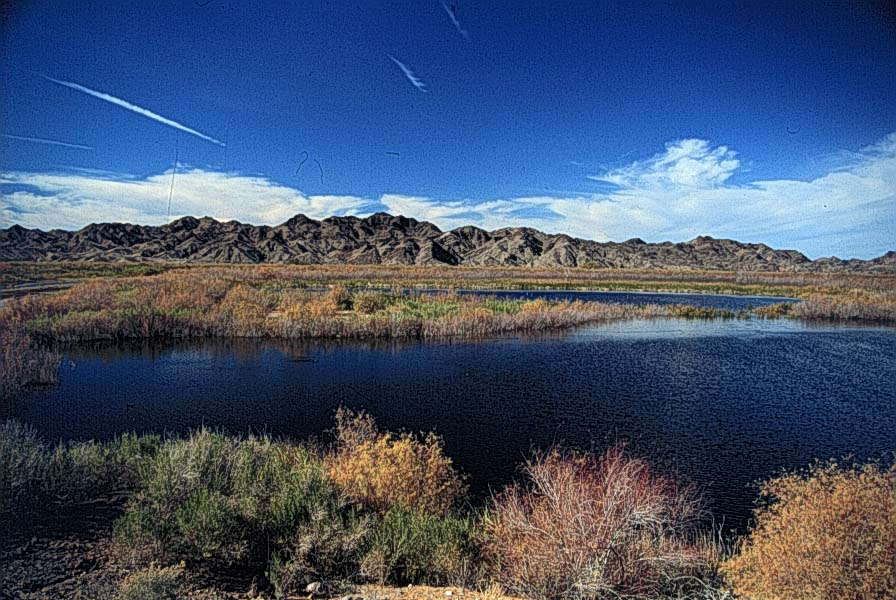
Mesquite Point at Imperial NWR

The Imperial National Wildlife Refuge protects wildlife habitat along 30 miles (50 km) of the lower Colorado River in Arizona and California, including the last un-channeled section before the river enters Mexico. The river and its associated backwater lakes and wetlands are a green oasis, contrasting with the surrounding desert mountains. It is a refuge and breeding area for migratory birds and local desert wildlife.

=== Sonny Bono Salton Sea NWR ===
The Sonny Bono Salton Sea National Wildlife Refuge is located 40 miles (64 km) north of the Mexican border at the southern end of the Salton Sea in California's Imperial Valley. Situated along the Pacific Flyway, the refuge is the only one of its kind, located 227 feet (69 m) below sea level. Because of its southern latitude, elevation, and location in the Colorado Desert, the refuge experiences some of the highest temperatures in the nation. Daily temperatures from May to October generally exceed 100 °F (38 °C) with temperatures of 116–120 °F (47–49 °C) recorded yearly.

=== Museum of History in Granite ===
The Museum of History in Granite in the town of Felicity exhibits granite monuments made from Missouri Red Granite. Each is 100 feet (30 m) long. Subjects include a Korean War Memorial, History of Arizona, The Wall for the Ages, the eight monument History of Humanity, and the History of the United States of America. Smaller monuments include the Felicity Stone (sm), a Rosetta Stone for the future located at the center of the History of Humanity monuments.

== Geography ==
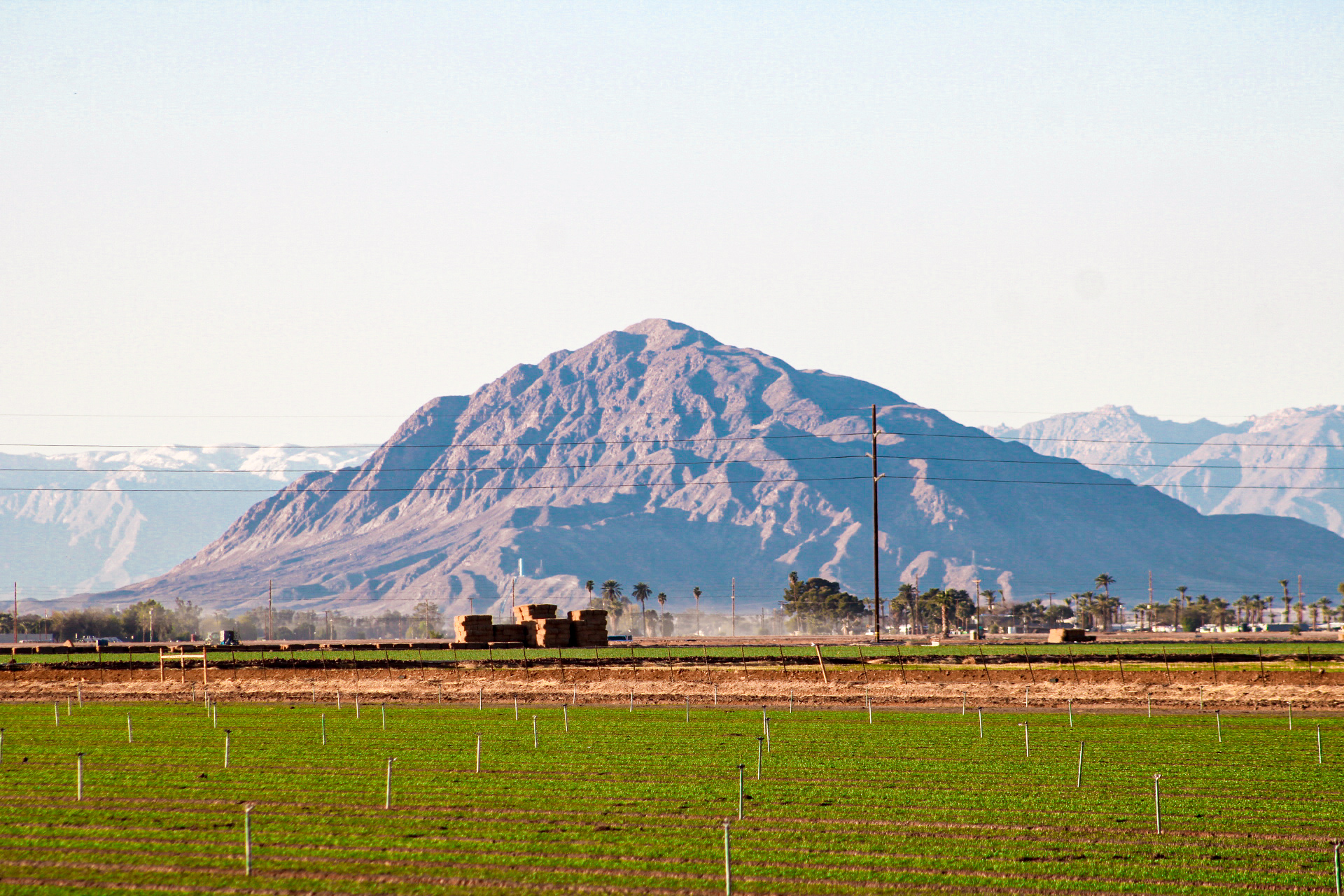
Fields with Mount Signal in Background

According to the U.S. Census Bureau, the county has a total area of 4,482 square miles (11,610 km^{2}), of which 4,177 square miles (10,820 km^{2}) is land and 305 square miles (790 km^{2}) (6.8%) is water. Much of Imperial County is below sea level. Imperial County is roughly twice the size in total square miles as the State of Delaware.

Imperial county is bordered on the north by Riverside County; on the east by Yuma County, Arizona; on the south by Mexico; and on the west by San Diego County. The Colorado River forms the county's eastern boundary. Notable geographic features in the county include the Salton Sea, at 235 feet (72 m) below sea level, the Algodones Dunes, one of the largest dune fields in America, and Arturos Bridge, a natural arch.

The county is in the Colorado Desert, an extension of the larger Sonoran Desert. The Chocolate Mountains are located east of the Salton Sea, and extend in a northwest–southeast direction for approximately 60 miles (97 km).

In this region, the geology is dominated by the transition of the tectonic plate boundary from rift to fault. The southernmost strands of the San Andreas Fault connect the northernmost extensions of the East Pacific Rise. Consequently, the region is subject to earthquakes, and the crust is being stretched, resulting in a sinking of the terrain over time. Related to the active geology are some interesting hydrothermal features. The area is also volcanic with multiple volcanic eruptions in the past few thousand years; the most recent was 1,800 years ago.

=== National protected areas ===
- Cibola National Wildlife Refuge (part)
- Imperial National Wildlife Refuge (part)
- Sonny Bono Salton Sea National Wildlife Refuge

== Demographics ==
Historical population
Census	Pop.	Note	%±
1910	13,591		—
1920	43,453		219.7%
1930	60,903		40.2%
1940	59,740		−1.9%
1950	62,975		5.4%
1960	72,105		14.5%
1970	74,492		3.3%
1980	92,110		23.7%
1990	109,303		18.7%
2000	142,361		30.2%
2010	174,528		22.6%
2020	179,702		3.0%
2025 (est.)	181,411	▲	1.0%
U.S. Decennial Census; 1790–1960 1900–1990; 1990–2000 2010–2015

=== 2020 census ===
As of the 2020 census, the county had a population of 179,702. The median age was 34.6 years, with 26.4% of residents under the age of 18 and 13.6% aged 65 or older. For every 100 women there were 100.6 men, and for every 100 women age 18 and over there were 99.5 men age 18 and over.

The racial makeup of the county was 26.5% White, 2.4% Black or African American, 2.4% American Indian and Alaska Native, 1.7% Asian, 0.1% Native Hawaiian and Pacific Islander, 39.2% from some other race, and 27.7% from two or more races. Hispanic or Latino residents of any race comprised 85.2% of the population. 81.6% of residents lived in urban areas, while 18.4% lived in rural areas.

There were 52,050 households in the county, of which 44.8% had children under the age of 18 living with them and 28.9% had a female householder with no spouse or partner present. About 17.5% of all households were made up of individuals and 8.5% had someone living alone who was 65 years of age or older.

There were 56,625 housing units, of which 8.1% were vacant. Among occupied housing units, 55.0% were owner-occupied and 45.0% were renter-occupied. The homeowner vacancy rate was 1.0% and the rental vacancy rate was 4.2%.

=== Racial and ethnic composition ===
Imperial County, California – Racial and ethnic composition Note: the US Census treats Hispanic/Latino as an ethnic category. This table excludes Latinos from the racial categories and assigns them to a separate category. Hispanics/Latinos may be of any race.
Race / Ethnicity (NH = Non-Hispanic)	Pop 1980	Pop 1990	Pop 2000	Pop 2010	Pop 2020	% 1980	% 1990	% 2000	% 2010	% 2020
White alone (NH)	35,411	31,742	28,768	23,927	16,813	38.44%	29.04%	20.21%	13.71%	9.36%
Black or African American alone (NH)	2,188	2,272	5,148	5,114	3,846	2.38%	2.08%	3.62%	2.93%	2.14%
Native American or Alaska Native alone (NH)	1,375	1,563	1,736	1,642	1,584	1.49%	1.43%	1.22%	0.94%	0.88%
Asian alone (NH)	1,752	1,632	2,446	2,201	2,244	1.90%	1.49%	1.72%	1.26%	1.25%
Native Hawaiian or Pacific Islander alone (NH)	x	x	75	87	82	0.05%	0.05%	0.05%	0.05%	0.05%
Other race alone (NH)	0	159	97	189	519	0.00%	0.15%	0.07%	0.11%	0.29%
Mixed race or Multiracial (NH)	x	x	1,274	1,097	1,587	x	x	0.89%	0.63%	0.88%
Hispanic or Latino (any race)	51,384	71,935	102,817	140,271	153,027	55.79%	65.81%	72.22%	80.37%	85.16%
Total	92,110	109,303	142,361	174,528	179,702	100.00%	100.00%	100.00%	100.00%	100.00%

=== American Community Survey 2025 data ===
The United States Census Bureau estimated that in 2025, Imperial County’s population was 181.411. It was also estimated that the county's population was 8,25% Non-Hispanic White, 86,81% Hispanic or Latino, 1,97% Non-Hispanic Black, 1,32% Asian, 0,24% Native American, 0,06% Pacific Islander, and 0,80% Multiracial.

Total	Population	Percentage
Non-Hispanic White	14.958	8,25%
Hispanic or Latino	157.488	86,81%
Non-Hispanic Black	3.579	1,97%
Asian	2.403	1,32%
Native American	1.415	0,78%
Pacific Islander	109	0,06%
Non-Hispanic Multiracial	1.459	0,80%

=== 2010 census ===
The 2010 United States census reported that Imperial County had a population of 174,528. The racial makeup of Imperial County was 102,553 (58.8%) White, 5,773 (3.3%) African American, 3,059 (1.8%) Native American, 2,843 (1.6%) Asian, 165 (0.1%) Pacific Islander, 52,413 (30.0%) from other races, and 7,722 (4.4%) from two or more races. Hispanic or Latino of any race were 140,271 persons (80.4%).

Population reported at 2010 United States census
The County	Total; Population	White	African; American	Native; American	Asian	Pacific; Islander	other races	two or more races	Hispanic or Latino (of any race)
Imperial County	174,528	102,553	5,773	3,059	2,843	165	52,413	7,722	140,271
Incorporated city	Total; Population	White	African; American	Native; American	Asian	Pacific; Islander	other races	two or more races	Hispanic or Latino (of any race)
Brawley	24,953	13,570	510	241	349	32	9,258	993	20,344
Calexico	38,572	23,150	134	204	504	21	12,920	1,639	37,354
Calipatria	7,705	3,212	1,612	79	95	25	2,455	227	4,940
El Centro	42,598	25,376	1,081	554	965	34	12,356	2,232	34,751
Holtville	5,939	3,655	37	41	50	4	1,977	175	4,858
Imperial	14,758	9,298	331	154	370	13	3,783	809	11,046
Westmorland	2,225	1,038	21	38	11	0	1,042	75	1,938
Census-designated place	Total; Population	White	African; American	Native; American	Asian	Pacific; Islander	other races	two or more races	Hispanic or Latino (of any race)
Bombay Beach	295	223	37	8	1	0	22	4	59
Desert Shores	1,104	709	8	26	4	1	307	49	848
Heber	4,275	2,174	5	33	15	0	1,758	290	4,197
Niland	1,006	539	36	20	36	0	315	60	618
Ocotillo	266	242	1	1	2	0	17	3	61
Palo Verde	171	124	2	5	1	0	26	13	33
Salton City	3,763	2,260	80	61	61	5	1,159	137	2,368
Salton Sea Beach	422	309	6	4	2	2	82	17	229
Seeley	1,739	746	19	7	21	2	793	151	1,489
Winterhaven	394	245	4	37	1	0	84	23	261
Other unincorporated areas	Total; Population	White	African; American	Native; American	Asian	Pacific; Islander	other races	two or more races	Hispanic or Latino (of any race)
All others not CDPs (combined)	24,343	15,683	1,849	1,546	355	26	4,059	825	14,877

=== 2000 census ===
As of the census of 2000, there were 142,361 people, 39,384 households, and 31,467 families residing in the county. The population density was 34 people per square mile (13 people/km^{2}). There were 43,891 housing units at an average density of 10 per square mile (3.9/km^{2}). The racial makeup of the county was 49.4% White, 4.0% Black or African American, 1.9% Native American, 2.0% Asian, 0.1% Pacific Islander, 39.1% from other races, and 3.7% from two or more races. 72.2% of the population were Hispanic or Latino of any race. 65.7% spoke Spanish at home, while 32.3% spoke only English.

There were 39,384 households, out of which 46.7% had children under the age of 18 living with them, 57.7% were married couples living together, 17.1% had a female householder with no husband present, and 20.1% were non-families. 17.1% of all households were made up of individuals, and 8.1% had someone living alone who was 65 years of age or older. The average household size was 3.33 and the average family size was 3.77.

In the county, the population was spread out, with 31.4% under the age of 18, 9.9% from 18 to 24, 30.4% from 25 to 44, 18.2% from 45 to 64, and 10.0% who were 65 years of age or older. The median age was 31 years. For every 100 females there were 109.3 males. For every 100 females age 18 and over, there were 111.4 males.

The median income for a household in the county was $31,870, and the median income for a family was $35,226. Males had a median income of $32,775 versus $23,974 for females. The per capita income for the county was $13,239. About 19.4% of families and 22.6% of the population were below the poverty line, including 28.7% of those under age 18 and 13.6% of those age 65 or over.

Imperial County has the lowest per capita income of any county in Southern California and among the bottom five counties in the state.

By 2006 the population had risen to 160,201, and the population growth rate since the year 2000 was 30%, the highest in California and fifth highest in the United States at the time. High levels of immigration, new residents' searches for affordable homes, and a search for retirement homes can explain the population increase.

== Government ==
The county is governed by the Imperial County Board of Supervisors, a five-member board elected by districts. Supervisors serve four-year terms. Other elected county officials include the Assessor, Auditor-Controller, District Attorney, County Clerk-Recorder, Public Administrator, Sheriff-Coroner, and Treasurer-Tax Collector. The county is run on a day-to-day basis by the County Executive Officer, which as of now is currently vacant following the termination of former CEO Michael Figueroa in April 2025. The county is advised as to legal matters by the County Counsel, who is currently Geoffrey P. Holbrook.

== Politics ==
=== Voter registration statistics ===
Population and registered voters
Total population	171,343	
Registered voters (Note: Percentage of registered voters with respect to total population. Percentages of party members with respect to registered voters follow.)	60,690	35.4%
Democratic	30,599	50.4%
Republican	14,413	23.7%
Democratic–Republican spread	+16,186	+26.7%
American Independent	1,402	2.3%
Green	141	0.2%
Libertarian	215	0.4%
Peace and Freedom	255	0.4%
Americans Elect	8	0.0%
Other	358	0.6%
No party preference	13,299	21.9%

==== Cities by population and voter registration ====
Cities by population and voter registration
City	Population	Registered voters	Democratic	Republican	D–R spread	Other	No party preference
Brawley	24,645	37.1%	50.5%	26.7%	+23.8%	5.9%	19.1%
Calexico	37,378	39.0%	61.8%	9.7%	+52.1%	4.2%	25.6%
Calipatria	7,292	16.0%	53.7%	18.7%	+35.0%	6.5%	23.4%
El Centro	42,141	38.1%	49.0%	25.6%	+23.4%	6.0%	21.6%
Holtville	5,908	35.3%	45.0%	28.4%	+16.6%	8.2%	21.5%
Imperial	14,017	40.9%	39.6%	32.4%	+7.2%	7.9%	23.1%
Westmorland	1,714	42.8%	56.0%	19.5%	+36.5%	7.1%	20.0%

=== Overview ===
Previously strongly Republican, Imperial County was a Democratic stronghold in presidential, congressional, and local elections from 1992 through 2020. The last Republican to win a majority in the county before this was George H. W. Bush in 1988.

However, in 2024, Republican Donald Trump flipped the county, receiving 49.12% of the vote, the highest percentage since 1988. The county swung over 25 points to the right from 2020 to 2024, the most of any county in California. This was in line with a trend of Trump winning most majority-Hispanic counties along the Mexico-U.S. border in 2024.

United States presidential election results for Imperial County, California
Year	Republican		Democratic		Third party(ies)	
Year	No.	%	No.	%	No.	%
1908	909	47.64%	675	35.38%	324	16.98%
1912	13	0.39%	1,295	38.46%	2,059	61.15%
1916	2,694	40.46%	3,273	49.15%	692	10.39%
1920	4,699	64.51%	2,022	27.76%	563	7.73%
1924	3,455	50.28%	759	11.04%	2,658	38.68%
1928	5,417	67.61%	2,486	31.03%	109	1.36%
1932	3,783	29.01%	8,772	67.28%	484	3.71%
1936	4,771	38.34%	7,560	60.75%	113	0.91%
1940	6,854	46.59%	7,728	52.53%	130	0.88%
1944	5,979	53.81%	5,085	45.76%	48	0.43%
1948	6,217	52.64%	5,301	44.89%	292	2.47%
1952	11,044	62.13%	6,619	37.24%	112	0.63%
1956	10,526	56.05%	8,197	43.65%	58	0.31%
1960	10,606	53.55%	9,119	46.04%	81	0.41%
1964	10,330	48.06%	11,143	51.85%	19	0.09%
1968	10,818	52.91%	7,481	36.59%	2,147	10.50%
1972	14,178	62.05%	7,982	34.93%	689	3.02%
1976	10,618	49.94%	10,244	48.18%	400	1.88%
1980	12,068	55.92%	7,961	36.89%	1,550	7.18%
1984	13,829	62.01%	8,237	36.94%	235	1.05%
1988	12,889	55.16%	10,243	43.84%	233	1.00%
1992	9,759	38.55%	11,109	43.88%	4,450	17.58%
1996	9,705	36.76%	14,591	55.27%	2,104	7.97%
2000	12,524	43.28%	15,489	53.53%	924	3.19%
2004	15,890	46.36%	17,964	52.41%	420	1.23%
2008	14,008	36.08%	24,162	62.24%	650	1.67%
2012	12,777	33.13%	25,136	65.18%	652	1.69%
2016	12,704	26.42%	32,667	67.93%	2,720	5.66%
2020	20,847	36.74%	34,678	61.11%	1,218	2.15%
2024	26,546	49.12%	26,083	48.27%	1,409	2.61%

On November 4, 2008, Imperial County voted 69.7% for Proposition 8, which amended the California Constitution to ban same-sex marriages, showing more support for the proposition than any other strongly Democratic county. After Proposition 8 was declared unconstitutional by a lower federal court, Imperial County continued to defend it in the federal judicial system. However, on February 6, 2012, the United States Court of Appeals for the Ninth Circuit denied Imperial County legal standing in the case Hollingsworth v. Perry.

In 2024, Imperial County also voted against 2024 California Proposition 3, which superseded Proposition 8, unlike its neighboring counties. However, the county voted for the unsuccessful 2024 California Proposition 32, which would have raised California's minimum wage to $18/hour, also unlike its neighboring counties. This indicates the county's political views are socially conservative, but economically progressive. The county voted for 2025 California Proposition 50, being one of several counties that voted for Donald Trump in 2024 to support the proposition.

Imperial County is in California's 25th congressional district, represented by Democrat Raul Ruiz. In the state legislature, the county is in the 36th Assembly district, represented by Republican Jeff Gonzalez, and the 18th senatorial district, represented by Democrat Steve Padilla.

== Crime ==
The following table includes the number of incidents reported and the rate per 1,000 persons for each type of offense.

Population and crime rates
Population	171,343	
Violent crime	590	3.44
Homicide	3	0.02
Forcible rape	18	0.11
Robbery	99	0.58
Aggravated assault	470	2.74
Property crime	3,134	18.29
Burglary	1,758	10.26
Larceny-theft	2,944	17.18
Motor vehicle theft	940	5.49
Arson	44	0.26

=== Cities by population and crime rates ===
Cities by population and crime rates
City	Population	Violent crimes	Violent crime rate per 1,000 persons	Property crimes	Property crime rate per 1,000 persons
Brawley	25,570	59	2.31	1,176	45.99
Calexico	39,527	108	2.73	1,538	38.91
El Centro	43,643	166	3.80	2,477	56.76
Holtville	6,088	11	1.81	98	16.10
Imperial	15,126	7	0.46	73	4.83
Westmorland	2,282	2	0.88	9	3.94

== Economy ==
Thousands of acres of prime farmland have transformed the desert into one of the most productive farming regions in California with an annual crop production of over $1 billion. Agriculture is the largest industry in Imperial County and accounts for 48% of all employment. Although this region is a desert, with high temperatures and low average rainfall of 3 inches (76 mm) per year, the economy is heavily based on agriculture due to irrigation, which is supplied wholly from the Colorado River via the All-American Canal.

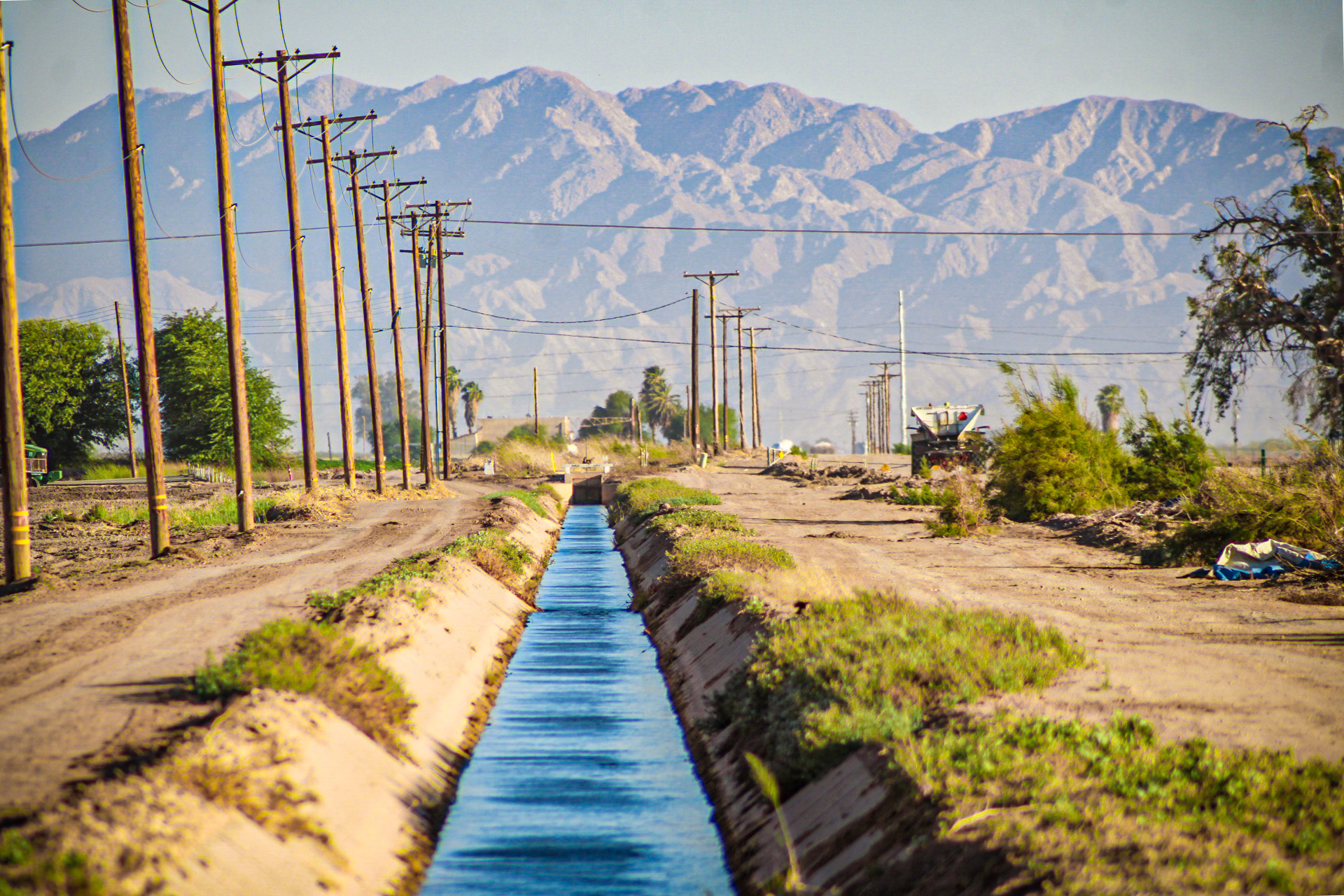
Irrigation Canal Imperial County

A vast system of canals, check dams, and pipelines carry the water all over the valley, a system which forms the Imperial Irrigation District, or IID. The water distribution system includes over 1,400 miles (2,300 km) of canal and with 1,100 miles (1,800 km) of pipeline. The number of canal and pipeline branches number roughly over a hundred. Imported water and a long growing season allow two crop cycles each year, and the Imperial Valley is a major source of winter fruits and vegetables, cotton, and grain for U.S. and international markets. Alfalfa is another major crop produced in the Imperial Valley. Imperial County produces nearly 2/3 of all vegetables consumed by Americans during the winter. The agricultural lands are served by a constructed agricultural drain system, which conveys surface runoff and subsurface drainage from fields to the Salton Sea, which is a designated repository for agricultural runoff.

Cotton in Imperial County and Riverside is predominantly Bt cotton. This is in contrast to the rest of the state, which largely relies on non-incorporated pesticides. The introduction of Bt cotton has dramatically reduced pesticide use here.

El Centro is the commercial center of Imperial County. Fifty percent of the jobs in El Centro come from the service and retail sector.

The growth of Imperial County as a filming location has spurred growth in servicing this industry. Because of the county's desert environment and proximity to Los Angeles, California, movies are sometimes filmed in the sand dunes outside the agricultural portions of the county. These have included Return of the Jedi, Stargate, The Scorpion King, and Into the Wild. Additionally, portions of the 2005 film Jarhead were filmed there because of its visual similarity to the desert terrain of Iraq.

In 2016, Imperial County had the highest unemployment rate of any county in the United States, at 23.5%.

=== Renewable energy ===
Imperial Valley has become a hotbed of renewable energy projects, both solar and geothermal. This is driven in part by California's mandate to generate 20% of its power from renewable sources by the end of 2010, the valley's excellent sun resources, the high unemployment, its proximity to large population centers on the coast, and large tracts of otherwise unusable desert land. Much of the land suitable for green energy is owned by the federal government (Bureau of Land Management). As of April 2008, the BLM has received 163 applications to build renewable energy projects on 1,600,000 acres (6,500 km^{2}) in California. Almost all of these are planned for the Imperial Valley and the desert region north of the valley. Stirling Energy is currently building one of the world's largest solar thermal plants, 10 square miles (26 km^{2}) with 38,000 "sun catchers," it will power up to 600,000 homes once it is fully operational by around 2015. CalEnergy runs a geothermal plant that generates enough power for 300,000 homes and could tap into more for up to 2.5 million homes.

== Transportation ==
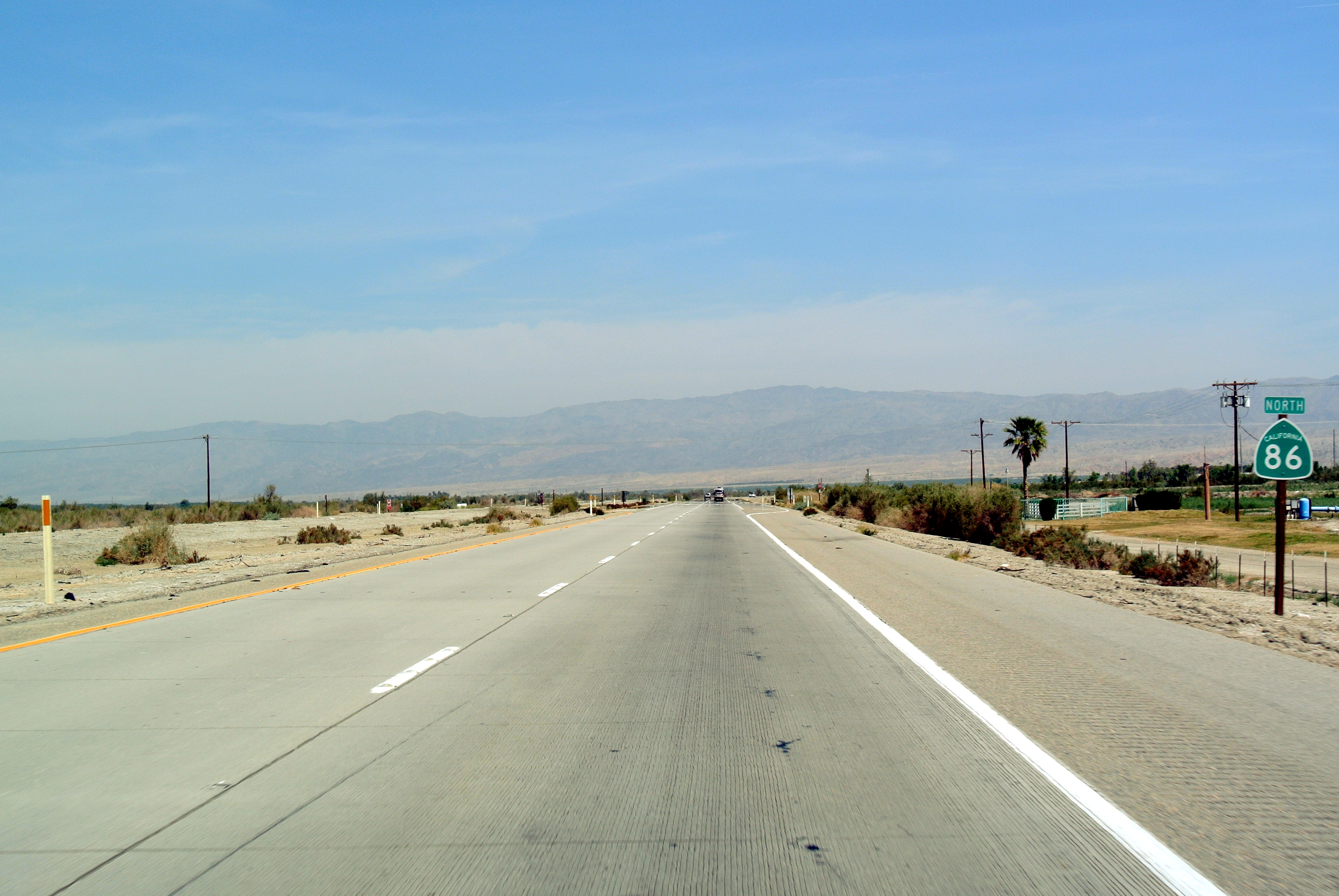
State Route 86 north of Salton City

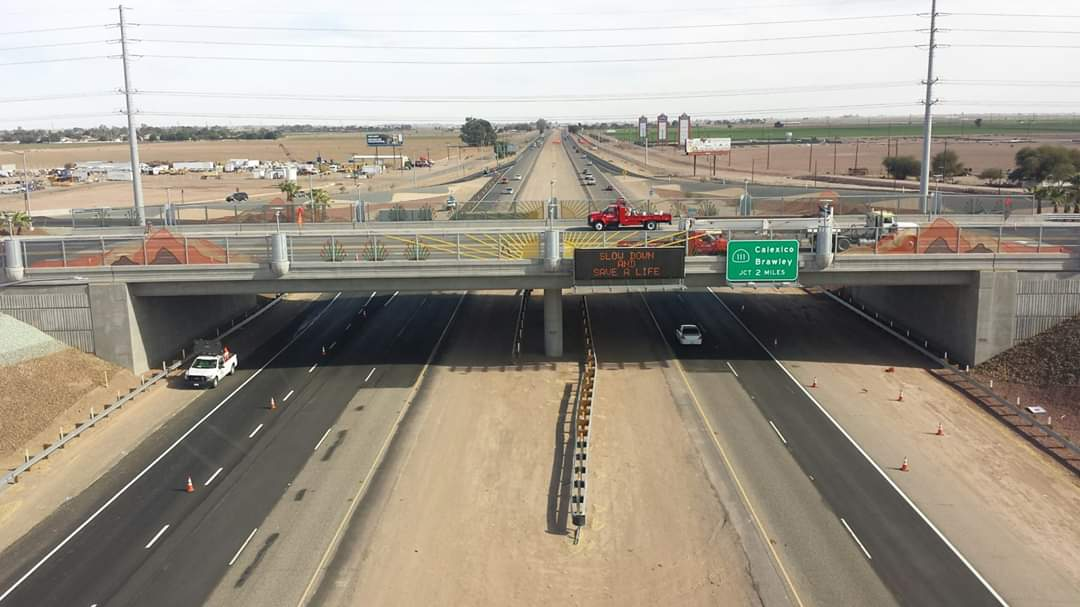
Dogwood Bridge over Interstate 8 in El Centro

=== Major highways ===
- Interstate 8
- State Route 7
- State Route 78
- State Route 86
- State Route 98
- State Route 111
- State Route 115
- State Route 186

Imperial County is at the junction of one interstate, and three state highways. Radiating to the east and west are connections to the Arizona Sun Corridor and San Diego-Tijuana metropolitan area via Interstate 8, Blythe, and northern San Diego County via State Route 78, the Mexicali Valley via State Route 111, and the Coachella Valley, Inland Empire, and Los Angeles metropolitan area via State Route 86.

=== Public transportation ===
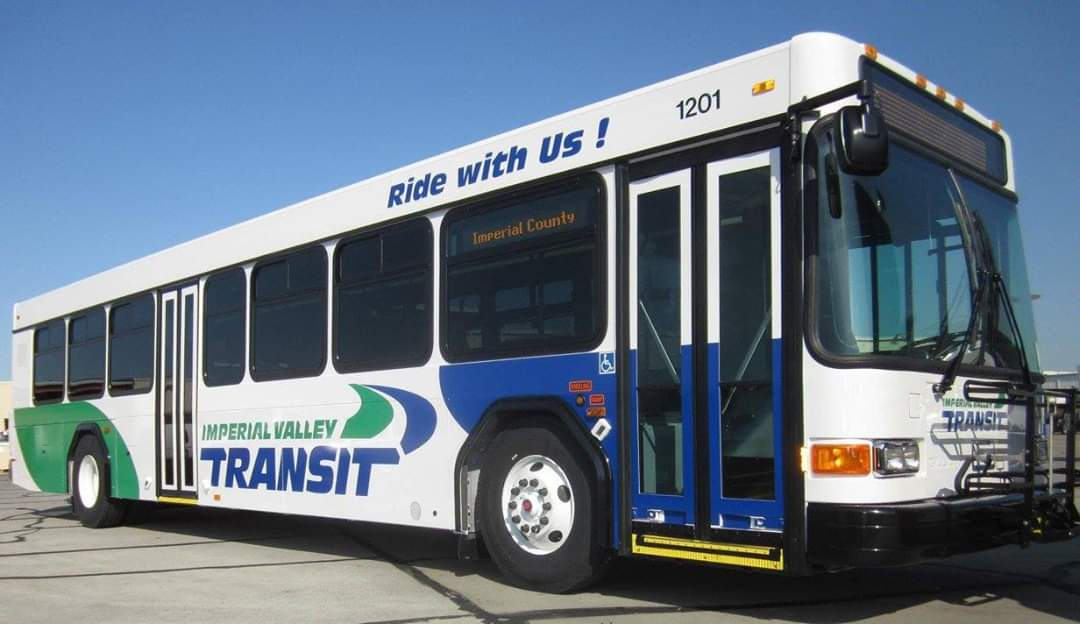
Imperial Valley Transit bus

Imperial County is served by Greyhound Lines and Imperial Valley Transit buses. Through a partnership between Imperial County Transportation Commission (ICTC), the Yuma County Intergovernmental Public Transportation Authority (YCIPTA), and the Quechan Indian Tribe, Yuma County Area Transit buses serve portions of Imperial County and connects it to Yuma, Arizona. Amtrak trains on the Sunset Limited and Texas Eagle route also travel through the county, but with no scheduled stops; the nearest stop is in Yuma, Arizona.

=== Airports ===
==== County owned ====
- Imperial County Airport, the county's main airport, is primarily a general aviation facility. It is located just north of El Centro, and has limited commercial flight service subsidized by the Essential Air Service program.
- Holtville Airport is a public use general aviation airport, owned by the county and located roughly 5 miles (8 km) east of Holtville.

==== Municipal ownership ====
- Brawley Municipal Airport is a public use general aviation airport, owned by and located in Brawley.
- Calexico Airport is a public use general aviation field, owned by and located in Calexico. It is located 15 miles (24 km) south of Interstate 8 on State Route 111. It used in part to service maquiladora factories in nearby Mexicali.
- Cliff Hatfield Memorial Airport is a public use general aviation airport, owned by and located in Calipatria.

==== Privately owned ====
- Salton Sea Airport is a public use general aviation airport located in Salton City.
- Douthitt Strip Airport is a private use facility in El Centro. It was formerly a military airfield.

==== Military ====
- Naval Air Facility El Centro is a U.S. Navy airfield in El Centro.

== Communities ==
=== Cities ===
- Brawley
- Calexico
- Calipatria
- El Centro (county seat)
- Holtville
- Imperial
- Westmorland

=== Census-designated places ===
- Bombay Beach
- Desert Shores
- El Centro NAF
- Heber
- Niland
- Ocotillo
- Palo Verde
- Salton Sea Beach
- Salton City
- Seeley
- Winterhaven

=== Unincorporated communities ===
- Alamorio
- Andrade
- Bard
- Bonds Corner
- Boulder Park
- Coyote Wells
- Dixieland
- Felicity
- Glamis
- Kane Spring
- Meloland
- Mount Signal
- Obregon
- Picacho
- Plaster City
- Slab City

=== Former settlements ===
- Bradtmoore
- Camp Gaston
- Carrizo Creek Station
- Hedges
- Indian Wells
- Jaeger City
- Ogilby
- Pilot Knob Station
- Potholes
- Sackett's Wells
- Silsbee
- Tumco

=== Indian Reservations ===
- Fort Yuma Indian Reservation (partially in Yuma County, Arizona)
- Torres-Martinez Indian Reservation (partially in Riverside County)

=== Population ranking ===
The population ranking of the following table is based on the 2010 census of Imperial County.

† county seat

Rank	City/Town/etc.	Municipal type	Population (2010 Census)
1	† El Centro	City	42,598
2	Calexico	City	38,572
3	Brawley	City	24,953
4	Imperial	City	14,758
5	Calipatria	City	7,705
6	Holtville	City	5,939
7	Torres-Martinez Reservation	AIAN	5,594
8	Heber	CDP	4,275
9	Salton City	CDP	3,763
10	Westmorland	City	2,225
11	Fort Yuma Indian Reservation (partially in Yuma County, AZ)	AIAN	2,189
12	Seeley	CDP	1,739
13	Desert Shores	CDP	1,104
14	Niland	CDP	1,006
15	Salton Sea Beach	CDP	422
16	Winterhaven	CDP	394
17	Bombay Beach	CDP	295
18	Ocotillo	CDP	266
19	Palo Verde	CDP	171

=== Area codes ===
442/760 – Covers all of the El Centro metropolitan area as well as Palm Springs, Oceanside, Bishop, Ridgecrest, Barstow, and Needles; northern San Diego County; and southeastern California, including much of the Mojave Desert and the Owens Valley. Area code 760 split from area code 619 on March 22, 1997, and was overlaid with area code 442 in 2009.

== Education ==
School districts are:

Unified:

- Calexico Unified School District
- Calipatria Unified School District
- Coachella Valley Unified School District
- Holtville Unified School District
- Imperial Unified School District
- San Pasqual Valley Unified School District

Secondary:

- Brawley Union High School District
- Central Union High School District

Elementary:

- Brawley Elementary School District
- El Centro Elementary School District
- Heber Elementary School District
- Magnolia Union Elementary School District
- McCabe Union Elementary School District
- Meadows Union Elementary School District
- Mulberry Elementary School District
- Seeley Union Elementary School District
- Westmorland Union Elementary School District

== See also ==
- Niland Geyser
- National Register of Historic Places listings in Imperial County, California
- Southern Border Region (California)
