= Seeley Union School District =

School district in California, United States

Address
- 1812 W. Rio Vista St. Seeley, California, 92273; United States

District information
- Type: Public
- Grades: K–8
- Established: 1912
- NCES District ID: 0636210

Students and staff
- Students: 393
- Teachers: 16.0 (FTE)
- Staff: 42.96 (FTE)
- Student–teacher ratio: 24.56:1

Other information
- Website: www.seeleyusd.org

Seeley Union School District is a public school district in Imperial County, California, United States. It serves Seeley and the surrounding area.

Elementary and middle school students living on post at Naval Air Facility El Centro (dependents of military personnel) attend Seely schools.
