= Silsbee =

Silsbee may refer to:

== Places ==
- Silsbee, California
- Silsbee, Texas
- Silsbee, Utah

== People with the surname ==
- Ann Loomis Silsbee, American composer and poet
- Joseph Lyman Silsbee, American architect
- Nathaniel Silsbee, American politician
- Nathaniel Silsbee, Jr., American politician and businessman
