= CUHSD =

CUHSD may refer to:

- Campbell Union High School District
- Central Union High School District
- Chowchilla Union High School District
