= Camp Seeley =

US army training center in California

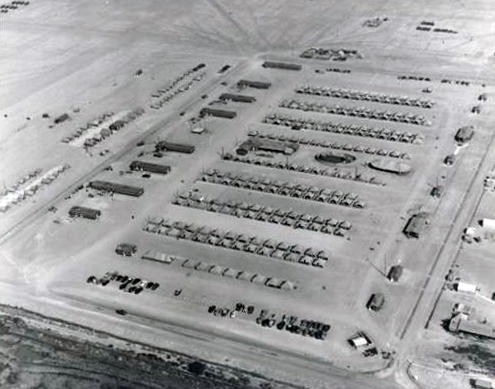
- Camp Seeley, tent camp 1942

- Location within California
- 32°48′56″N 115°41′50″W
- Location: Seeley, California

History
- Built: 1941

Site notes
- Area: 17,574 acres (7,112 ha)
- Architect: US Army

Camp Seeley' was a United States Army World War II training camp near El Centro, California in the Imperial Valley. At Camp Seeley was: the Camp Seeley Combat Firing Range, Camp Seeley Ordnance Desert Proving Ground and Camp Seeley Ordnance Training Center. The 17,574 acres (7,112 ha) Camp Seeley was 10 miles (16 km) northwest of the City of El Centro, near the city of Seeley, California. The town is named after Henry Seeley, a pioneer of the Imperial Valley. The camp was north of what is now California State Route 98. The tent camp, in the Yuha Desert, opened November 1940, first based at the camp was the 11th Cavalry Regiment, the troops and Army horse came from the Presidio of Monterey, California. At the camp the 11th Cavalry Regiment took part in desert training and teaching horses to swim across rivers with rider. 11th Cavalry Regiment moved to Camp Lockett at Campo, California in December 1941. The 11th and 28th Cavalry Regiment also trained at the camp, along with the 75th Horse Field Artillery Battalion. In 1942 Camp Seeley was converted to a US Army ordnance proving ground. While the camp is closed the area of Camp Seeley the home of the Historical "The Colonel's Own." 11th Cavalry Horse Honor Guard.

The US Army Quartermaster Test Command opened the Desert Test Command Headquarters in March 1942 at Camp Seeley. The ordnance proving ground job was to test armed vehicles, tanks, and trucks and jeeps. Camp Seeley had sand terrain and high temperatures for these tests. Live fire tests were not done at Camp Seeley, as live fire test was done in the nearby vast Desert Training Center. The camp was transferred to the US Army Ordnance Department in August 1942, later renamed Ordnance Desert Proving Ground. The camp was closed on 18 April 1946 and returned to the Department of the Interior. The former camp is now run by the currently a Bureau of Land Management for off-road vehicle use.

== See also ==
- Camp Laguna Arizona proving ground in WW2
- Yuma Test Branch Arizona proving ground in WW2
- Yuma Proving Ground current Arizona proving ground
- California during World War II
