= Naval Air Facility El Centro =

- Vraciu Field
- Near Seeley, California in the United States
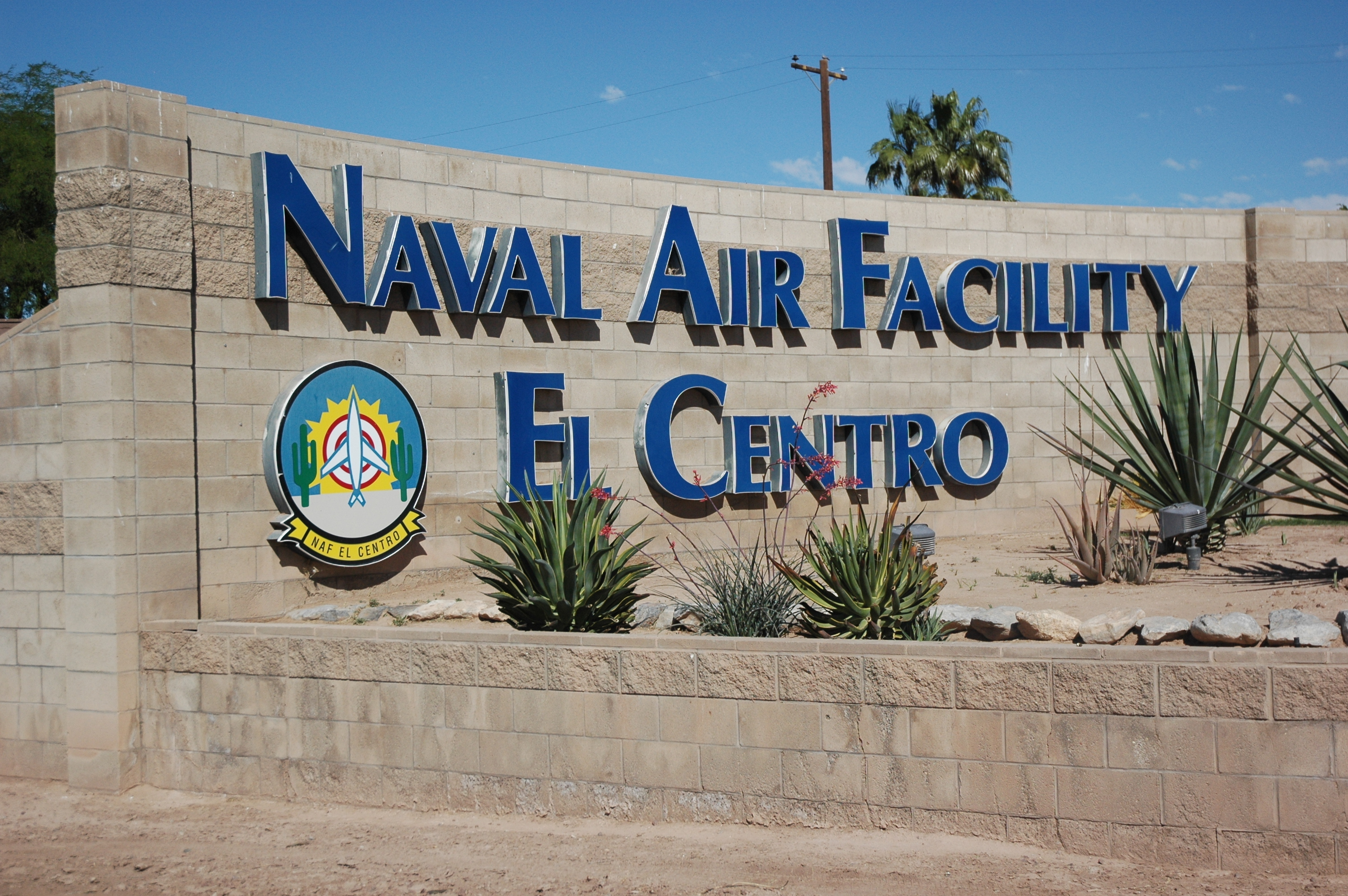
- Entrance sign at NAF El Centro

Site information
- Type: Naval Air Facility
- Owner: Department of Defense
- Operator: US Navy
- Controlled by: Navy Region Southwest
- Condition: Operational
- Website: Official website

Location
- Location in Southern California Location in California Location in the United States
- Coordinates: 32°49′45″N 115°40′18″W

Site history
- Built: 1942 (as Marine Corps Air Station)
- In use: 1942 – present

Garrison information
- Current commander: Captain Ryan Carstens

Airfield information
- Identifiers: IATA: NJK, ICAO: KNJK, FAA LID: NJK, WMO: 722810
- Elevation: −12.8 metres (−42 ft) AMSL
Runways
Direction	Length and surface
08/26	2,896.5 metres (9,503 ft) Porous European Mix
12/30	2,080.2 metres (6,825 ft) Porous European Mix

Naval Air Facility El Centro or NAF El Centro (IATA: NJK, ICAO: KNJK, FAA LID: NJK) is a United States Navy Naval Air Facility located approximately six miles (10 km) northwest of El Centro, in unincorporated Imperial County, California. NAF El Centro is under the jurisdiction of Navy Region Southwest and serves both as temporary homeport to military units conducting air-to-air and bombing training, and as the winter training home of the Blue Angels aerobatics display team.

Founded in 1946 as Naval Air Station El Centro, the facility had previously been the site of a World War II era Marine Corps Air Station. In 1979, the facility was given its current designation as a Naval Air Facility.

== History ==
In 1940, the United States Army established Camp Seeley; its combat firing range site is within the current boundaries of the El Centro Naval Reservation. In 1941 the Civil Aeronautics Administration offered to replace the small airport in Imperial, California with a larger complex consisting of two 4,500ft runways. After the outbreak of World War II, the U.S. Navy leased the new airport and an adjacent 749 acres for additional construction. During this time the runways were extended and a third one was added. The expansion of MCAS El Centro was done by Vinson & Pringle and Del E. Webb Construction Company out of Phoenix, Arizona. MCAS El Centro was commissioned on July 23, 1943. During the war, the air station was used as a training base for new squadrons and as a facility for squadrons returning from overseas to reorganize and begin preparing to deploy again. On March 15, 1945 a Marine Corps Aerial Gunnery School was opened. MCAS El Centro was decommissioned on May 1, 1946, the same day it was taken over by the Navy for use as a Naval Air Station. Fleet Air Gunnery Unit was opened. Through the years, Navy El Centro has had several names: Naval Air Facility, Naval Auxiliary Landing Field, Naval Air Station, and the National Parachute Test Range.

For the first 35 years, the mission of NAF El Centro was devoted to aeronautical escape system testing, evaluation, and design. In November 1947, the Parachute Experimental Division from Naval Air Station Lakehurst, New Jersey moved to El Centro. In 1951, the Joint Parachute Facility was established and consisted of the Naval Parachute Unit and the U.S. Air Force (USAF) 6511th Parachute Development Test Group. The USAF remained part of El Centro's test organization for the next 27 years.

On August 12, 1954, "[t]he 6511th Parachute Development Test Group redesignated as the 6511th Test Group (Parachute). The unit’s personnel did not change and its location remained at El Centro. Administrative and operational control remained with the Air Force Flight Test Center" and the Wright Air Development Center continued its technical supervision and test programming as before.

In 2011, Prince Harry, Duke of Sussex trained at El Centro and at Gila Bend Air Force Auxiliary Field. While at both bases Harry trained on the AgustaWestland Apache.

== Current operations ==
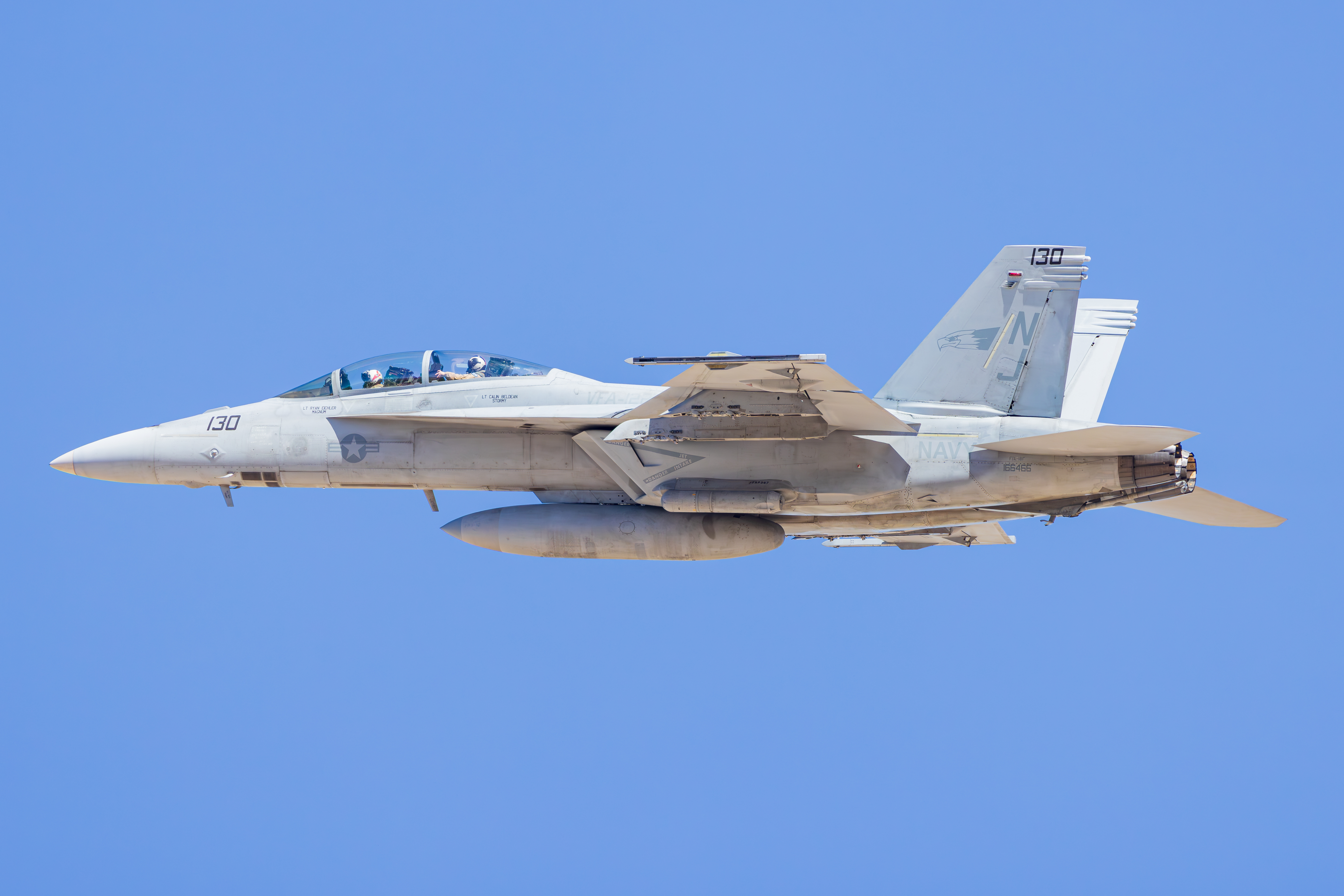
A US Navy F/A-18F Super Hornet of VFA-122 over El Centro, 2023

The facility has two operating runways. The 9,503-foot (2,897 m) east–west runway handles 96 percent of the traffic. It is equipped with a Fresnel lens optical landing system (FLOLS) at each approach end, as well as lit aircraft carrier flight deck landing areas at both ends, so pilots can simulate carrier landings.

Apart from touch-and-go landings and take-offs, aircrews use the many ranges at NAF El Centro to develop their skills. A remote-controlled target area allows naval aviators and naval flight officers to practice ordnance delivery. The desert range is used for air-to-ground bombing, rocket firing, strafing, dummy drops and mobile land target training. The target complex uses the Weapons Impact Scoring System that microwaves target images to a range master control building for immediate verification of weapons delivery accuracy.

The addition of the Display and Debriefing Subsystem, known as DDS, expanded the role of NAF El Centro to include air combat training by utilizing remote television, acoustical and laser scoring systems. The DDS is linked with the Tactical Air Crew Training System (TACTS) to provide a computerized record of the tactics employed by individual aircrews to employ and to evaluate the effectiveness of each maneuver.

The facility is also home to the British Joint Helicopter Force (US) which is part of Joint Helicopter Command.

== Air show ==
NAF El Centro is the winter home of the U.S. Navy Flight Demonstration Squadron, The Blue Angels. NAF El Centro historically kicks off the Blue Angels' season with their first air show.

== In popular culture ==
Much of the movie Jarhead was filmed around El Centro, and many of the extras from the movie were from NAF El Centro.

In the beginning of the 1990 movie Revenge, Kevin Costner plays an F-14 Tomcat pilot stationed at El Centro.

== Demographics ==
El Centro Naval Air Facility
- Census-designated place
- Location within California Location within the United States
- Country: United States
- State: California
- County: Imperial

Area
  - Total: 4.191 sq mi (10.85 km^{2})
  - Land: 4.191 sq mi (10.85 km^{2})
  - Water: 0 sq mi (0 km^{2})
- Elevation: −43 ft (−13 m)

Population (2020)
  - Total: 280
  - Density: 67/sq mi (26/km^{2})
- Time zone: UTC-8 (Pacific)
  - Summer (DST): UTC-7 (PDT)
- GNIS feature ID: 2512301

The United States Census Bureau has designated the Naval Air Facility, under the name El Centro Naval Air Facility, as a separate census-designated place (CDP) for statistical purposes, covering the residential population. It first appeared as a CDP in the 2020 Census with a population of 280.

Historical population
Census	Pop.	Note	%±
2020	280		—
U.S. Decennial Census; 2020

=== 2020 census ===
El Centro Naval Air Facility CDP, California – Racial and ethnic composition Note: the US Census treats Hispanic/Latino as an ethnic category. This table excludes Latinos from the racial categories and assigns them to a separate category. Hispanics/Latinos may be of any race.
Race / Ethnicity (NH = Non-Hispanic)	Pop 2020	% 2020
White alone (NH)	96	34.29%
Black or African American alone (NH)	46	16.43%
Native American or Alaska Native alone (NH)	0	0.00%
Asian alone (NH)	16	5.71%
Native Hawaiian or Pacific Islander alone (NH)	0	0.00%
Other Race alone (NH)	3	1.07%
Mixed race or Multiracial (NH)	21	7.50%
Hispanic or Latino (any race)	98	35.00%
Total	280	100.00%

== Education ==
Families living on post are zoned to Seeley Union School District for elementary and middle school, and Southwest High School of Central Union High School District.

== See also ==
- Fleet Air Gunnery Unit Pacific
- List of United States Navy airfields
