= Southwest High School (El Centro, California) =

Public high school in California, United States

Location
- 2001 Ocotillo Drive; El Centro, California; United States
- Coordinates: 32°46′33.6″N 115°34′53.99″W

Information
- Type: Public
- Established: 1996
- School district: Central Union High School District
- Principal: Joe Derma
- Staff: 91.19 (FTE)
- Grades: 9-12
- Enrollment: 1,842 (2023–2024)
- Student to teacher ratio: 20.20
- Color
- Mascot: Eagle
- Newspaper: The Talon
- Yearbook: The "Aerie"
- Website: http://www.eaglesnet.net

Southwest High School (known as Southwest or SHS) is a 4 year public secondary school in El Centro, California that serves approximately 2,085 students to its diverse population. Southwest is one of the 3 high schools within the Central Union High School District. It has been a California Distinguished School.

High school students living on post at Naval Air Facility El Centro (dependents of military personnel) attend Southwest HS.

== Athletics ==
SHS competes in the Imperial Valley League in the California Interscholastic Federation San Diego Section. The school's teams are called the Eagles

Fall Sports

- Cross Country (JV, Varsity) (Co-ed)
- American Football (JV, Varsity)
- Girls Flag Football (JV, Varsity)
- Girls Volleyball (Frosh, JV, Varsity)
- Girls Tennis (JV, Varsity)
- Girls Golf (JV, Varsity)

Winter Sports

- Soccer (Frosh, JV, Varsity)
- Basketball (Frosh, JV, Varsity)
- Wrestling (Frosh, JV, Varsity)
- Girls Basketball (Frosh, JV, Varsity)

Spring Sports

- Baseball (Frosh, JV, Varsity)
- Softball (Frosh, JV, Varsity)
- Track (JV, Varsity)
- Swim (Frosh, JV, Varsity)
- Boys Tennis (JV, Varsity)
- Boys Golf (JV, Varsity)

Yearly

- Cheerleading (JV, Varsity)
