= Gulf of California moisture surge =

Meteorological event

Conceptual diagram of how a tropical system can trigger a gulf surge

A Gulf of California moisture surge, or simply gulf surge, is a meteorological event where a pulse of high humidity air is pushed up the Gulf of California. Gulf surges bring moisture to southern Arizona during the North American Monsoon. Prior to the 1970s, the consensus of meteorologists was the moisture that fueled the central and southern Arizona monsoon resulted from the movement of the Bermuda High to a more south and west position, which in turn transported water vapor to the region from the Gulf of Mexico. However, operational meteorologists in the 1970s described episodic surges of moisture that infiltrated the area that was thought to originate in the Gulf of California. It was noted that these episodes were likely to be associated with a convective system near the tip of the Baja peninsula such as a tropical cyclone or an easterly wave.

== North American monsoon ==
The North American Monsoon is experienced as a seasonal reversal of the prevailing winds, which is usually accompanied by an increase in rainfall. Onset is usually in early July when the winds start to shift due to intense solar heating of the Southwest United States. During the winter months, the weather patterns in the Southwest United States are characterized by a semi-permanent high-pressure system with quasi-weekly weather systems moving through the area; a cold front will move through the area, followed by a gradual building of the ridge. During the monsoon months, the subtropical ridge moves northward due to the development of a thermal low from the intense solar radiation. The low develops over the Mexican Plateau and gradually moves northward towards the Four Corners region. Rains from the monsoon typically start in May or June along the western slope of the Sierra Madre Occidental and move northward, reaching southern Arizona sometime in July. The North American Monsoon is not as strong or persistent as its Indian counterpart, mainly because the Mexican Plateau is not as high or as large as the Tibetan Plateau in Asia.

== Dynamics ==
There have been several proposed mechanisms for the development of gulf surges including gravity currents, ageostrophic flows, Kelvin waves, or Rossby waves. However, due to a lack of observations in the area, the exact cause is uncertain. The best data currently available that indicates moisture arriving from the gulf is from the NEXRAD radar in Yuma, Arizona. This instrument has the capability to measure wind speed and direction at several altitudes in the atmosphere in what is known as a vertical wind profile. The first indication of a gulf surge is a change in the surface wind direction at Yuma, Arizona, with the winds switching from westerly to south-easterly. This flow tends to get wider and deeper as the surge progresses. During the monsoon, there is a pressure difference between the heat low that is present over the Southwestern United States and the relative high pressure over the northern portion of the gulf. Winds will blow from the south due to the pressure gradient force. Typically, during a traditional surge, a large mesoscale convective system is located off the southern tip of the Baja peninsula. Flow around such a low pressure system is cyclonic, which corresponds to counter-clockwise. Some of this circulation will make its way into the gulf and get funneled northward towards the southwestern United States like a waveguide. As this moist air travels northward, it encounters the already present southerly winds and gets pushed into southern Arizona. The high pressure area over the northern gulf tends to push the moisture surge to the east towards the Tucson area.

Gulf of California moisture surges were first scientifically documented in the early 1970s. John Hales, formerly of the Phoenix National Weather Service office, wrote in the April 1972 edition of Monthly Weather Review that gulf surges are related to large areas of cloud masses that are transported northward up the Gulf of California and spill into southern Arizona. He wrote that a surge resembles a large sea breeze. Ira Brenner continued studying gulf surges in 1974, and like Hales found that they resemble a large sea breeze with warm, moist air transported northward in the lowest 10,000 feet (3.0 km) of the atmosphere. Brenner was the first to suggest that easterly waves may be important in the initiation of a gulf surge.

The mid-1990s saw a resurgence of interest in the North American Monsoonal system. Using data collected during the SWAMP–90 field campaign, Michael Douglas found that the surge of moisture was associated with a low level jet. The jet was strongest from 300 metres (980 ft) to 600 metres (2,000 ft) above the surface. It also showed diurnal variations, with air traveling downslope toward the Gulf of California in the mornings and upslope in the evenings. During the field campaign, the jet was found to be a consistent feature during widely varying synoptic conditions; with it being present at Yuma 75% of the days studied. Further, the launch of the GOES 9 instrument in 1995 has enabled scientists to detect the amount of water vapor in a column of the atmosphere. By looking at time evolution of precipitable water contours, scientists are able to track the progression of moisture up the gulf and into Arizona. A 1997 modeling study suggests that a mid-latitude westerly disturbance several days prior to a tropical easterly disturbance is necessary for the development of a strong gulf surge. The westerly disturbance increases the amount of subsidence that occurs over the gulf which reduces the depth of the planetary boundary layer. Outflow from deep convection associated with the easterly wave is then confined within the shallow boundary layer. They note that weak surges can occur without the mid-latitude westerly, but that strong surges require both components. In a 2000 Monthly Weather Review article, Fuller and Stensrud show that over the 14 years studied the easterly waves consistently produce gulf surges within three days of the trough passing the tip of Baja California. They stress that the correlation does not allow one to determine causality, but that it is consistent with the conceptual model proposed by Stensrud et al. in 1997.

The North American Monsoon Experiment was a field experiment that added many observations to the typical observing system in the Gulf of California such as radiosondes, rain gauges, and radar during the summer of 2004. Several surges took place during this period associated with the passing of a tropical cyclone near the tip of the Baja Peninsula. Many characteristics of surges were seen during these events such as a heat low over the Four Corners region of the United States and increased easterly flow off the Sierra Madre Occidental leading to convective downdrafts.

== Effects ==
Since one of the major characteristics of a surge is the transport of water, measurements of precipitable water and the dew point can also increase. The increased water vapor increases the amount of convective available potential energy (CAPE), which can result in topographically forced convection. Gulf moisture is typically constrained to central and southern Arizona by the topography of the Mogollon Rim. The moderate steering flow from the surge pushes the convection off the mountains which brings precipitation to the desert valleys.

Precipitation from gulf surge events can produce locally heavy rainfall which result in flash floods. In August 2003, such an event occurred in Las Vegas, Nevada where some areas received over 3 inches (7.6 cm) of rain in half an hour.

Summarizing the work of Hales and Brenner, Fuller and Stensrud describe the effects that are commonly associated with gulf surges. During the onset of the surge, surface temperatures will drop, the dew point will rise, and sea level pressure will decrease. Winds will swing from northwesterly to southerly. These changes produce lower visibility and low clouds. This results in increased low-level cooling that is greatest at the surface and decreases with height. As the surge reaches the northern tip of the gulf, the surge spreads into the southern Arizona and southeastern California desert areas and the cooling diffuses. The increased water vapor results in an increase in the number of thunderstorms in the Southwestern U.S

== See also ==
- Continental Divide of the Americas
- Convective instability
- Peninsular Ranges
