= Glenn Cadrez =

American football player (born 1970)

No. 50, 59, 51
- Position: Linebacker

Personal information
- Born: January 2, 1970 (age 56); El Centro, California, U.S.
- Listed height: 6 ft 3 in (1.91 m)
- Listed weight: 240 lb (109 kg)

Career information
- High school: Central Union (El Centro)
- College: Houston
- NFL draft: 1992: 6th round, 154th overall pick

Career history
- New York Jets (1992–1995); Denver Broncos (1995–2000); Kansas City Chiefs (2001–2002)

Awards and highlights
- 2× Super Bowl Champion (XXXII, XXXIII)

Career NFL statistics
- Tackles: 254
- Sacks: 14.5
- Interceptions: 3
- Stats at Pro Football Reference

Glenn E. Cadrez (born January 2, 1970) is an American former professional football player who was a linebacker for 11 seasons in the National Football League (NFL), primarily for the Denver Broncos. He played for the Broncos from 1995 to 2000 and was a starter in Super Bowl XXXIII and also played in Super Bowl XXXII, making him a two-time Super Bowl champion.

== Career ==
Cadrez was the 154th overall pick in the 1992 NFL draft after playing college football for the Houston Cougars. He played for the New York Jets (1992–1995), Denver Broncos (1995–2000), and Kansas City Chiefs (2001–2002). He was named the AFC Defensive Player of the Week 10/11/98-10/17/98.

== Post-playing career ==
Cadrez also hosted the Brawley, California, based sports talk show "The Saturday Morning Blitz". The focus was Major League Football with local high school football talk throughout the show. During the 3-hour broadcast, from 9 am to 12 noon, Cadrez and his co-host talked about current NFL games, highlighted the night-before high school games of the Valley, and talked to past and present NFL coaches and team members. The show ran on Saturdays beginning August through January 2003 and again in the 2004 season before Cadrez moved on to other activities. The show aired live on KROP-AM 1300 of Brawley, California.

After Cadrez's football career ended, he and fellow former University of Houston teammate Christopher Tuffin co-founded the horror film finance, production, and sales outfit BloodWorks.

== Personal life ==
Cadrez married a woman from his home town, El Centro, California, named Betsy Burke-Cadrez, and had three children. After divorcing, he married former Baywatch star and Playboy Playmate of the Year, Brande Roderick, whom he met while playing a role in his third film Hood of Horror. They were engaged in August 2006 and married in 2007. They divorced in 2017.

Cadrez has three daughters and two sons: Tahnee Freda, Caylee, Phoebee, Keaton, and Kannon.
