= El Centro Elementary School District =

School district in California, United States

Location
- 1256 Broadway; El Centro, California 92243 United States

District information
- Grades: TK–8
- Established: 1908
- Superintendent: Jon K. LeDoux
- Schools: 12
- NCES District ID: 0612030

Students and staff
- Students: 5178
- Teachers: 239

Other information
- Website: www.ecesd.org

El Centro Elementary School District is a public school district based in Imperial County, California, United States.

== Schools ==
=== Middle School ===
- De Anza Magnet
- Kennedy Middle School
- Wilson Jr. High School

=== Elementary School ===
- Desert Garden Elementary School
- Hedrick Elementary School
- Harding Elementary School
- Imperial Valley Home School Academy
- Lincoln Elementary School
- McKinley Elementary School
- ML King Elementary School
- Sunflower Elementary School
- Booker T. Washington Elementary School
