= Central Union High School (El Centro, California) =

Public high school in California, United States

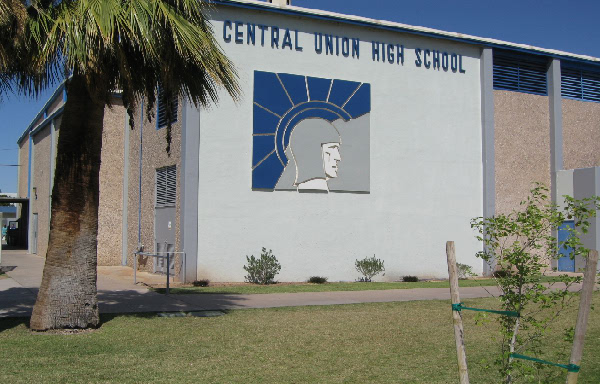

Location
- 1001 Brighton Avenue; El Centro, California 92243; United States; 32°47′24″N 115°33′50.4″W

Information
- School type: Public, Secondary
- Established: September 28, 1908
- Status: Open
- School district: Central Union High School District
- NCES School ID: 060801000771
- Principal: Craig Lyon
- Teaching staff: 92.52 (FTE)
- Grades: 9-12
- Enrollment: 1,955 (2023-2024)
- Student to teacher ratio: 21.13
- Colors: Blue and White also gray
- Mascot: Spartans
- Accreditation: Western Association of Schools and Colleges
- Newspaper: The Shield
- Yearbook: La Solana
- Website: http://www.spartansnet.net/
- Last updated: january 2019

Central Union High School, also known as Central or CUHS, is a four-year public high school in El Centro, California, United States with a diverse student body of more than 1,910 students. It is one of three schools in the Central Union High School District.

== History ==
The school was established in 1908, and celebrated its centennial in 2008.

Among the most well-known alumni are actor Donal Logue from the class of 1984, who starred in the Fox TV sitcom "Grounded for Life" and was Central's ASB president his senior year; professional saxophonist Walter Beasley, a member of the school's Great Spartan Band in the 1970s under the late band director and local jazz legend Jimmie Cannon; Doug Harvey, an umpire in the National Baseball Hall of Fame; former Denver Broncos linebacker Glenn Cadrez and actress Kyle Richards of the class of 1987; and actor/artist H. Michael Wieben, class of 1962, who appeared on and off Broadway.

Central's annual football game with the Brawley Union High School Wildcats of Brawley, CA which is called the bell game is one of the oldest high school rivalries in the country.

== Clubs ==
=== Academic Decathlon ===
Central's Academic Decathlon team won the Imperial County Competition every year from 1981 until 2014; they have competed in the state competition in Sacramento, CA annually.

=== Mock Trial ===
Central's Mock Trial team participates in the Constitutional Rights Foundation's California Mock Trial Program, and has competed and won in the state championship in 1986 and 1998. In 2015, the team placed second in the state championship, the first time in the team's history.

== Athletics ==
Central competes in the Imperial Valley League in the California Interscholastic Federation San Diego Section. The school's teams are called the Spartans and its colors are blue and white.

The Spartans' longtime archrivals are the Brawley Wildcats. The annual football game, known as the Bell Game, began in 1943 when the schools' associated student bodies bought the bell from a ship in San Diego for $50. But the Central-Brawley rivalry predates the Bell Game and began in 1921. Azucena Hernandez

=== Fall Sports ===
- Volleyball
- Girls’ Flag Football
- Cross Country
- Girls' Volleyball
- Girls' Golf
- Girls' Tennis
- Boys' Football
- JV Cheer
- Varsity Cheer

=== Winter Sports ===
- Boys' Basketball
- Girls' Basketball
- Boys' Soccer
- Girls' Soccer
- Wrestling

=== Spring Sports ===
- Boys' Tennis
- Boys’ Volleyball
- Swimming
- Softball
- Baseball
- Boys' Golf
- Track and Field

=== The Great Spartan Band ===
The Great Spartan Band performs at all home football games and is known for its "Spartan Shuffle" as it enters the field during pre-game and as it exits the field after halftime. The band also performs in local events and parades in Imperial and San Diego counties. In addition, Central has an award-winning jazz band and a wind ensemble.

The band has performed across the country and received awards and honors from the Orange Coast College Jazz Festivals, El Centro Navy Base Jazz Festival, Southwestern College Jazz Festival, Imperial Valley College Jazz Festival, USC Concert of the Bands, UCLA Band Festival, Holiday Bowl Music Festivals, Columbus Day Parade, Mother Goose Parade, Hawaii memorial parades, and the Disneyland Parades and concerts in 1975, 1976, 1977, and 1987.

Under the direction of Jimmie Cannon from 1966 to 1996, the Great Spartan Band began to travel extensively and in 1972 performed in Mexico City, where it was honored by the Mexican President Luis Echeverría. The band has a standing invitation to perform in the Mardi Gras parades in New Orleans, most recently in 2016. The band also traveled to Disney World in Florida in 1995, where it participated in the Magic Kingdom Easter Parade.

The Great Spartan Band was invited by Congressman Bob Filner (California's 51st District) to participate in the 2010 Memorial Day Parade in Washington, DC.
