= North American monsoon =

Pattern of thunderstorms and rainfall

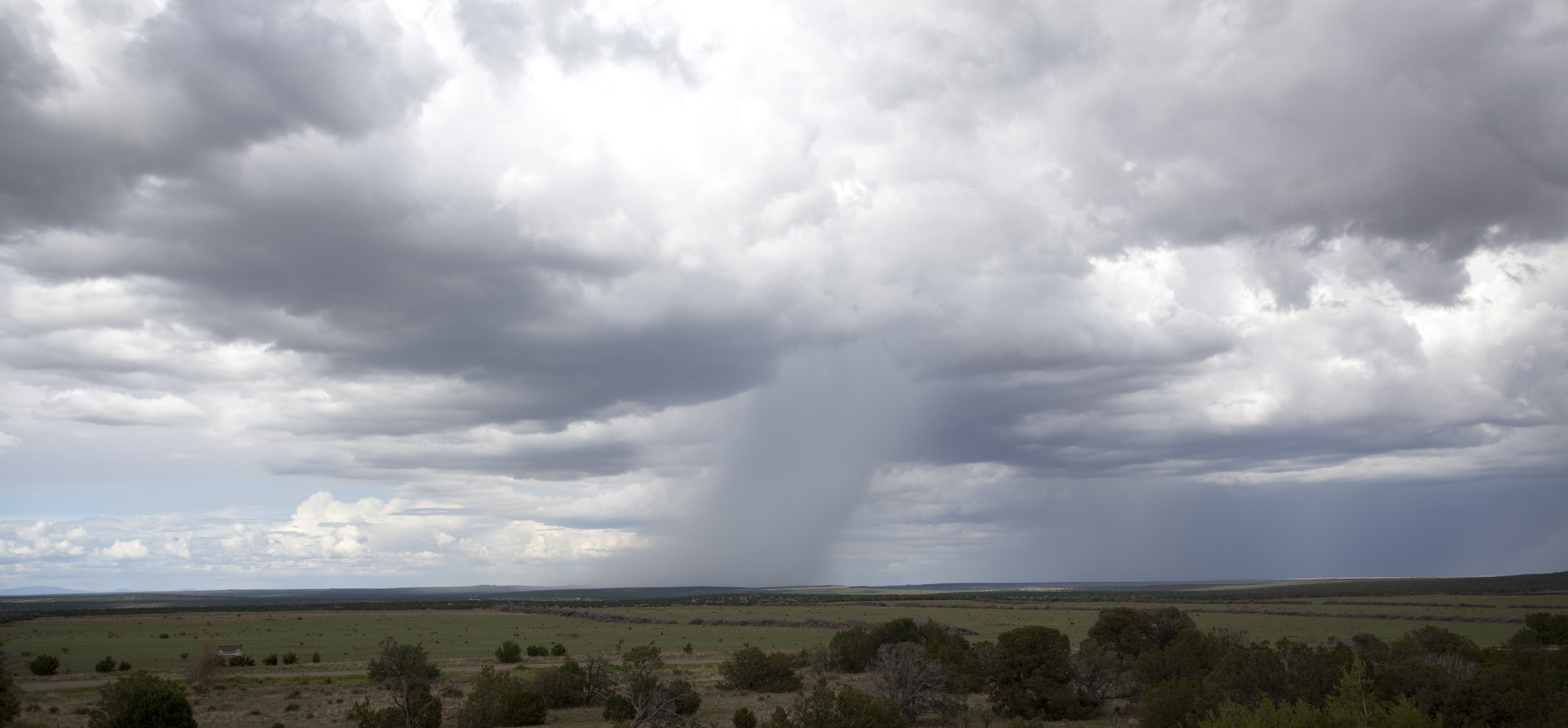
Summer monsoon rain over eastern New Mexico

The North American monsoon, variously known as the Southwest monsoon, the Mexican monsoon, the New Mexican monsoon, or the Arizona monsoon is a pattern of pronounced seasonal increase in thunderstorms and rainfall over large areas of the southwestern United States and northwestern Mexico.

Geographically, the weather pattern is centered over the Sierra Madre Occidental in the Mexican states of Sinaloa, Durango, Sonora and Chihuahua, and typically occurs between June and mid-September. Thunderstorms are fueled by daytime heating and build up during the late afternoon and early evening. Typically, these storms dissipate by late night, and the next day starts out fair, with the cycle repeating daily. The cycle typically loses its energy by mid-September when much drier conditions are reestablished over the region.

Whether the North American monsoon is a true monsoon remains controversial.

== Mechanism ==
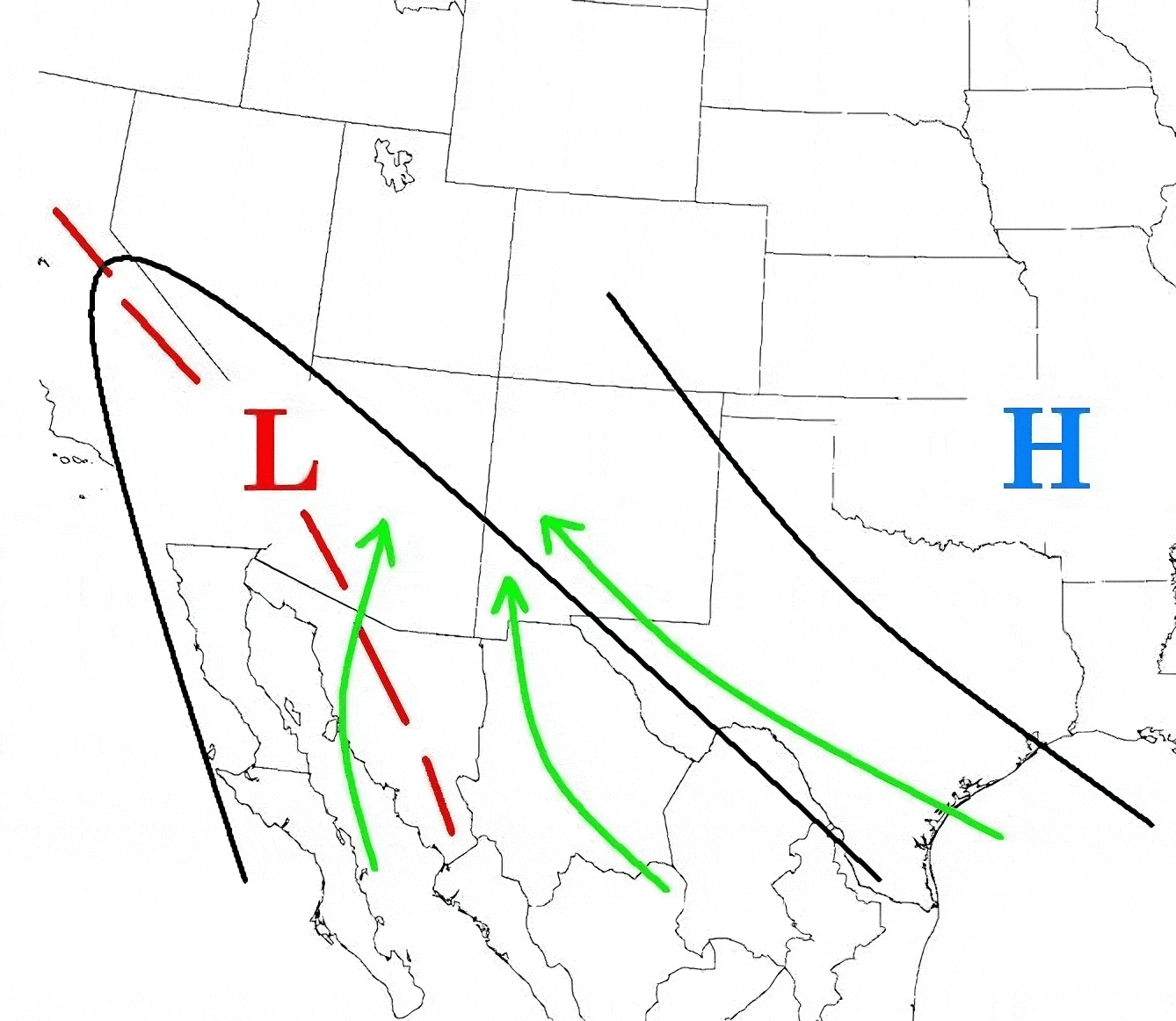
Weather pattern of the North American monsoon

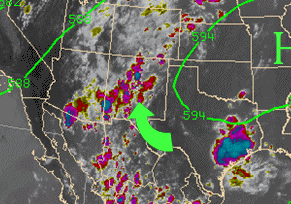
Typical precipitation pattern of the North American monsoon (green arrow)

The North American monsoon is a complex weather process that brings moisture from the Gulf of California (and to lesser extent the eastern Pacific and Gulf of Mexico) over northwestern Mexico and southwestern US resulting in summer thunderstorms, especially at higher elevations. The North American monsoon is not as strong or persistent as its Indian counterpart, mainly because the Mexican Plateau is not as high or as large as the Tibetan Plateau in Asia. However, the North American monsoon shares most of the basic characteristics of its Indian counterpart.

In the monsoon area, the late spring period is very hot and dry, because the dry western side subtropical high pressure ridge and dry continental air have not begun to 'shift' northwards yet. During this period, inland areas have extremely low relative humidity, and characteristically very low dew points, which are frequently well below the freezing mark. In some years, this delayed effect is more substantial if the dryline which separates the hot and dry airmass to the Northwest from the humid monsoon airmass to the Southeast, fails to migrate. This can prevent tropical moisture from reaching farther Northwest towards Death Valley until later in the summer. If this pattern prevails, the Nevada deserts may receive almost no monsoon.

In early summer, the monsoon starts with a shift in wind patterns as Mexico and the southwest U.S. warm under intense solar heating. The prevailing winds start to flow from somewhat cooler moist ocean areas into hotter, dry land areas. Precipitation increases in late May to early June in southern Mexico and spreads along the western slopes of the Sierra Madre Occidental, reaching New Mexico and southeast Arizona in early July. It extends into the southwest United States as it matures in mid-July, when an area of high pressure, called the monsoon or subtropical ridge, develops in the upper atmosphere over the Four Corners region, creating wind flow aloft from the east or southeast. At the same time, a thermal low (a trough of low pressure from intense surface heating) develops over the Mexican Plateau and the Desert Southwest of the United States.

The thermal low sets up circulation that brings pulses of low level moisture from the Gulf of California and eastern Pacific. The Gulf of California, a narrow body of water surrounded by mountains, is particularly important for low-level moisture transport into Arizona and Sonora. Upper level moisture is also transported into the region, mainly from the Gulf of Mexico by easterly winds aloft. Once the forests of the Sierra Madre Occidental green up from the initial monsoon rains, evaporation and plant transpiration can add additional moisture to the atmosphere which will then flow into Arizona and New Mexico. Finally, if the southern Plains of the U.S. are unusually wet and green during the early summer months, that area can also serve as a moisture source.

As precipitable water values rise in early summer, brief but often torrential thunderstorms can occur, especially over mountainous terrain. This activity is occasionally enhanced by the passage of tropical waves and the entrainment of the remnants of tropical cyclones.

== Effects ==
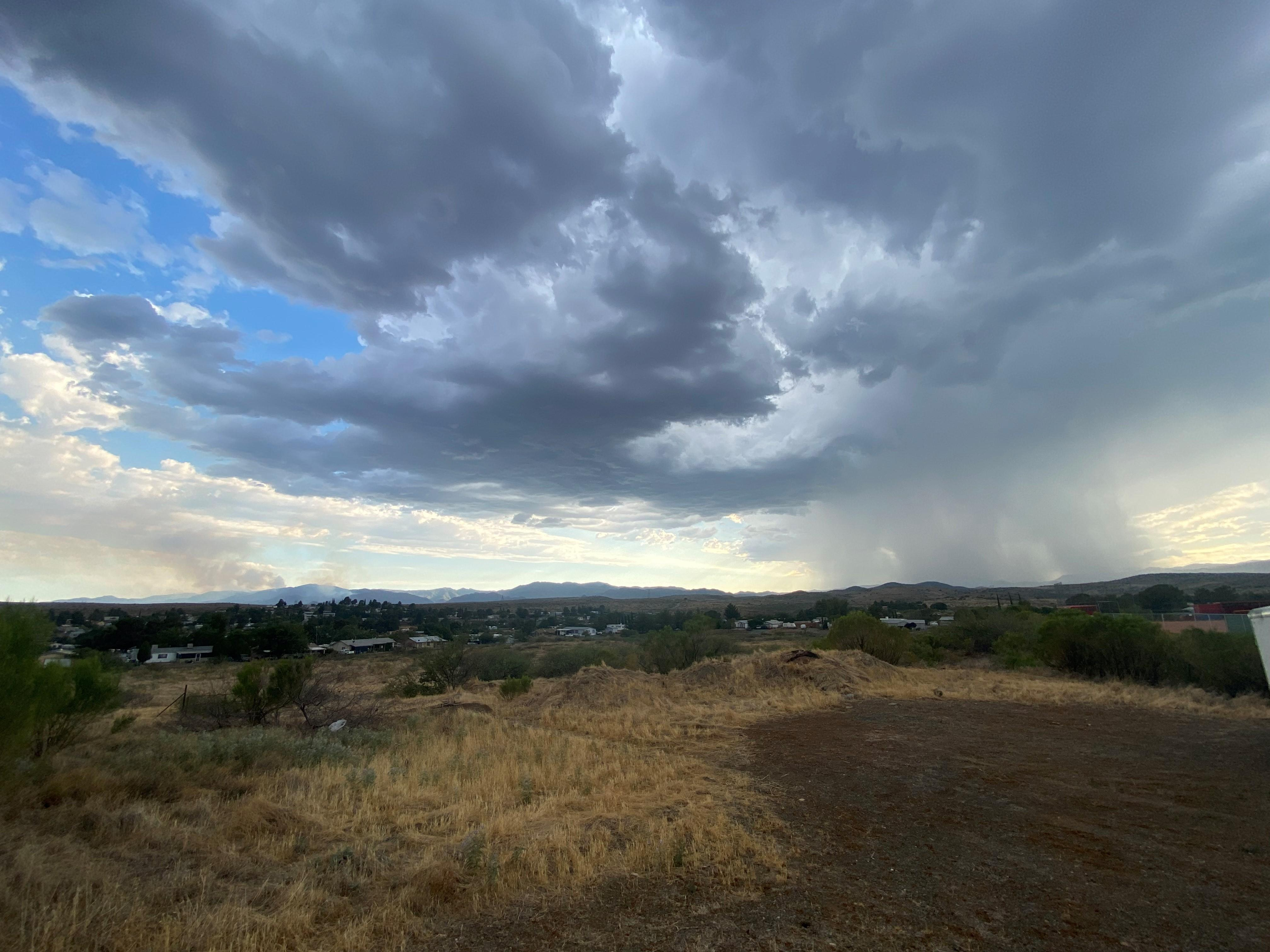
A seasonal monsoon storm approaching the Tiger Fire on July 9, 2021

Monsoon precipitation accounts for a substantial portion of annual precipitation in northwest Mexico and the Southwestern United States. Most of these areas receive over half their annual precipitation from the monsoon. Many desert plants are adapted to take advantage of this brief wet season. Because of the monsoon rains, the Sonoran and Mojave are considered relatively "wet" when ranked among other deserts such as the Sahara, and helps fuel the Chihuahuan Desert's high species diversity.

Monsoons often play a role in reducing wildfire threats by providing moisture at higher elevations during the wildfire season. Heavy monsoon rain can lead to excess winter plant growth, in turn a summer wildfire risk. A lack of monsoon rain can hamper summer seeding, reducing excess winter plant growth but worsening drought.

Flash flooding is a serious danger during the monsoon. Dry washes can become raging rivers in an instant, even when no storms are visible as a storm can cause a flash flood tens of miles away. Lightning strikes are also a significant danger. Because it is dangerous to be caught in the open when these storms suddenly appear, many golf courses in Arizona have thunderstorm warning systems. In Albuquerque, flash flooding from storms funneled into the Rio Grande Valley by the Sandia-Manzano mountain range has prompted the city to develop an extensive system of concrete-lined arroyos and retention structures, similar to the flood control channels in the Los Angeles River basin.

Once the monsoon is underway, mountain ranges, including the Sierra Madre Occidental, the Mogollon Rim, and the Rio Grande Rift ranges provide a focusing mechanism for the daily development of thunderstorms. Thus much of the monsoon rainfall occurs in mountainous terrain. For example, monsoon rainfall in the Sierra Madre Occidental typically ranges from 10 to 15 inches. Since the southwest U.S. is at the northern fringe of the monsoon, precipitation is less and tends to be more variable. Areas farther west of the core monsoon region, namely California and Baja California, typically receive only scattered monsoon-related rainfall. In those areas, the intense solar heating is not strong enough to overcome a continual supply of cold water from the North Pacific Ocean moving down the west coast of North America. Winds do turn toward the land in these areas, but the cool moist air actually stabilizes the atmosphere. The monsoon pushes as far west as the Southeastern Deserts of California, which include the Imperial and Coachella Valleys, as well as Peninsular Ranges and Transverse Ranges of Southern California. These storms rarely reach the major coastal areas of San Diego or Los Angeles. As shown in the panorama below, a wall of thunderstorms, only a half-hour's drive away, is a common sight from the sunny skies along the coast during the monsoon.

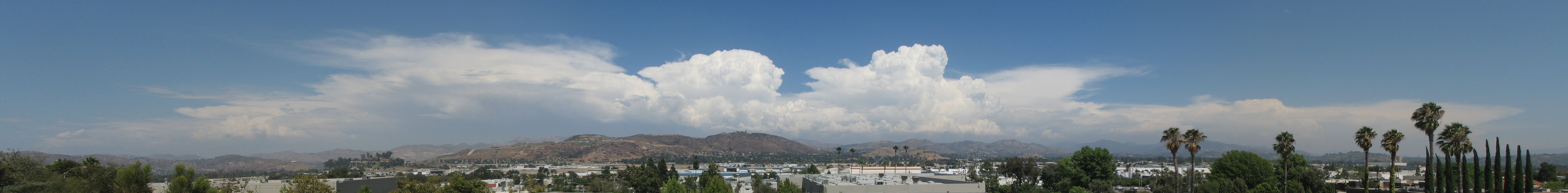
Monsoonal thunderstorms as seen from El Cajon, California

== Variability ==
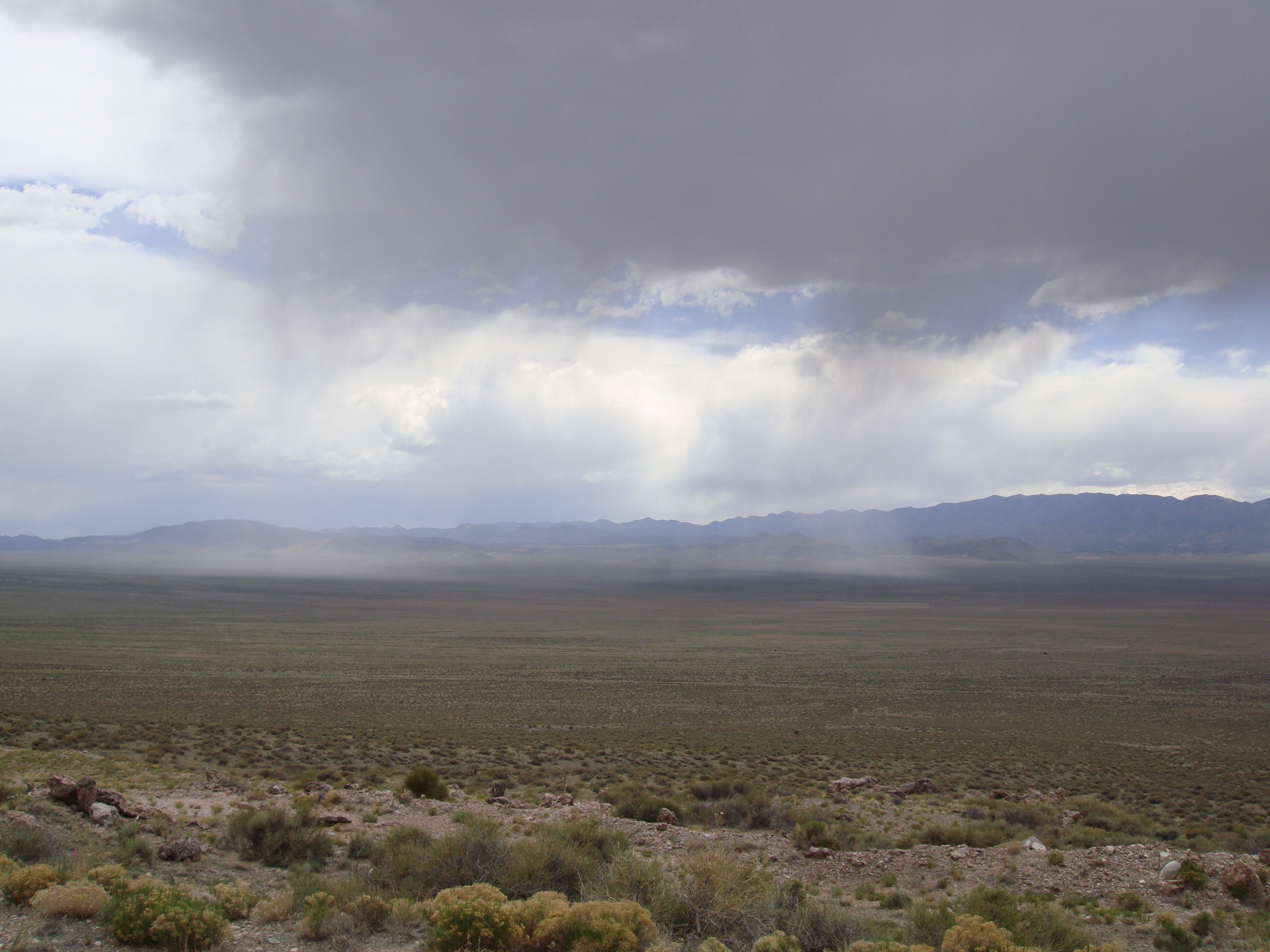
An isolated thunderstorm rolls through Wah Wah Valley, Utah. This type of monsoonal pattern is very common in the late summer of the southwest US.

Rainfall during the monsoon is not continuous. It varies considerably, depending on a variety of factors. There are usually distinct "burst" periods of heavy rain during the monsoon, and "break" periods with little or no rain. The variability is difficult to understand and predict, because it results from the complex interactions between atmospheric circulation features at both the synoptic (100 to 1000 km spatially, 1 day to 1 week temporally) and mesoscale (several km to 100 km, hours to one day temporally) and the extremely varied topography. The larger-scale atmospheric motions may control the distribution of water vapor and the general stability or instability (that is, the tendency to form storms) in the atmosphere; nevertheless, local topographic effects are critical to the geographic and even temporal distribution of convective activity.

The monsoon ridge is almost as strong as the one which develops over Asia during the summer. However, since the lower level moisture flow is not as persistent as in the Indian monsoon, the upper level steering pattern and disturbances around the ridge are critical for influencing where thunderstorms develop on any given day. The exact strength and position of the subtropical ridge also governs how far north the tropical easterly winds aloft can spread. If the ridge is too close to a particular area, the sinking air at its center suppresses thunderstorms and can result in a significant monsoon "break." If the ridge is too far away or too weak, the east winds around the high are inadequate to bring tropical moisture into the mountains of Mexico and southwest U.S. However, if the ridge sets up in a few key locations, widespread and potentially severe thunderstorms can develop.

Monsoon variability from one summer to the next is substantial, and exceeds the normal monsoon seasonal precipitation at most locations. For example, the normal monsoon precipitation at Tucson, Arizona is 6.06 inches (154 mm). The driest monsoon season measured 1.59 inches (40 mm), and the wettest measured 13.84 inches (352 mm).

Research since 2010 has investigated the possible causes behind North American monsoon variability. The following factors affect the North American monsoon:

- Sea surface temperature anomalies
- Large-scale circulation patterns
- Previous year's precipitation
- Location of the Intertropical Convergence Zone
- Variability in the Gulf of California moisture surges

None of these factors can perfectly predict the variability. These factors are related to each other and are not independent. For example, sea surface temperatures affect all the other factors to some extent.

In some years, the Nevada deserts may receive almost no monsoon influence if the western subtropical high shifts less than in typical years. For instance in 2020, the subtropical high remained further south than usual due to the influence of a strong ridge of high pressure over the northern Pacific, displacing the jet stream further inland. The combination of these factors blocked moist tropical air from reaching the American Southwest, leading to below average rainfall.

== Definition ==
Whether the North American Monsoon (NAM) is a "true monsoon" has been controversial. Until the late 1970s, there was serious debate about whether a monsoon truly existed in North America. However, according to NOAA, considerable research culminating in 1993 established the fact that a summer monsoon develops over much of Mexico and the intermountain region of the U.S.

The controversy continues in part because of the incomplete reversal of the winds during the NAM. The prevailing winds shift from westerly before to southerly during the NAM. Because this is not a complete 180-degree reversal, some climatologists claim the weather pattern is not a true monsoon. Other climatologists disagree.

== See also ==
- ARkStorm
- Haboob
