= Silsbee, California =

Coordinates: 32.75640°N 115.64177°W

Silsbee is a former settlement in Imperial County, California. It was located 6 miles (10 km) west-southwest of El Centro.

A post office operated at Silsbee from 1902 to 1909. The name honors Thomas Silsbee, rancher. Described as a "picturesque lakeside townsite" on the shores of the now-drained Blue Lake, the town was thought to hold potential as a new recreational resort. However, the town was destroyed by an overflow of the Colorado River that gave rise to the Salton Sea in 1905, and a new townsite was established a few miles north at Seeley, California.
