= Seeley, California =

Seeley
- census-designated place
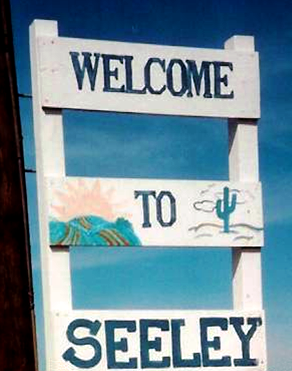
- Seeley's welcome sign

- Location in Imperial County and the state of California

- Location in the United States
- Coordinates: 32°47′35″N 115°41′28″W
- Country: United States
- State: California
- County: Imperial

Area
  - Total: 1.443 sq mi (3.738 km^{2})
  - Land: 1.413 sq mi (3.660 km^{2})
  - Water: 0.030 sq mi (0.078 km^{2}) 2.09%
- Elevation: −36 ft (−11 m)

Population (2020)
  - Total: 1,729
  - Density: 1,314/sq mi (507.5/km^{2})
- Time zone: UTC-8 (Pacific (PST))
  - Summer (DST): UTC-7 (PDT)
- ZIP code: 92273
- Area codes: 442/760
- FIPS code: 06-70798
- GNIS feature IDs: 1661418, 2409303

Seeley is a census-designated place (CDP) in Imperial County, California. Seeley is located 7.5 miles (12 km) west of El Centro. The population was 1,729 at the 2020 census, down from 1,739 at the 2010 census. It is part of the El Centro Metropolitan Area.

== History ==
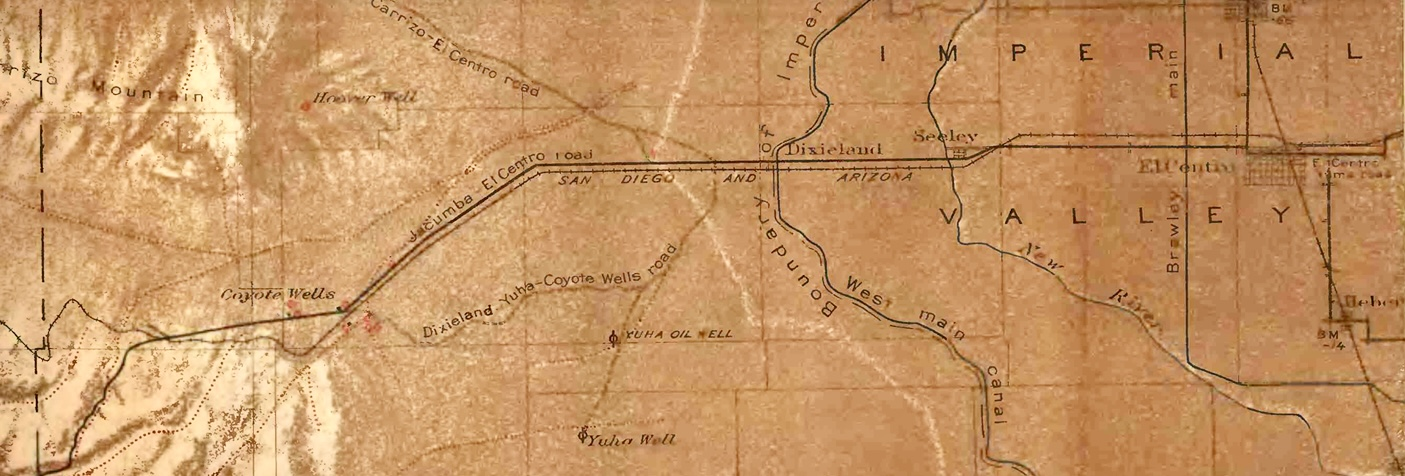
Seeley on a map in 1920

The first post office at Seeley was opened in 1909. The name honors Henry Seeley, an early developer of Imperial County.

Seeley is one of the oldest established communities in Imperial County, tracing its history back to the early years of the 20th century. It succeeded the town of Silsbee, which was originally established as a stage stop on the shores of the now drained Blue Lake. When irrigation channels from the Colorado River overflowed and flooded the basin of the Salton Sea between 1905 and 1907, the townsite of Silsbee was flooded and abandoned, and the new town of Seeley was established a few miles north.

NAF El Centro, the winter home of the Blue Angels, was built adjacent to Seeley in 1946. In 1964, Interstate 8 was run a mile south of Seeley, marking the lowest elevation on the Interstate Highway System at -52 feet.

== Geography ==
Bordered on the west by the New River, Seeley sits astride the Imperial Fault and above what was once the basin of the "Blue Lake". Like much of the Imperial Valley, Seeley lies entirely below sea level.

According to the United States Census Bureau, the CDP has a total area of 1.44 square miles (3.7 km^{2}), of which 1.41 square miles (3.7 km^{2}) is land and 0.03 square miles (0.078 km^{2}) (2.09%) is water.

=== Climate ===
This area has a large amount of sunshine year-round due to its stable descending air and high pressure. According to the Köppen Climate Classification system, Seeley has a desert climate, abbreviated "Bwh" on climate maps.

== Demographics ==
Historical population
Census	Pop.	Note	%±
1980	1,058		—
1990	1,228		16.1%
2000	1,624		32.2%
2010	1,739		7.1%
2020	1,729		−0.6%
U.S. Decennial Census; 1860–1870 1880-1890; 1900 1910 1920; 1930 1940 1950; 1960 1970 1980; 1990 2000 2010; 2020

Seeley first appeared as a census designated place in the 1980 U.S. census.

=== Racial and ethnic composition ===
Seeley CDP, California – Racial and ethnic composition Note: the US Census treats Hispanic/Latino as an ethnic category. This table excludes Latinos from the racial categories and assigns them to a separate category. Hispanics/Latinos may be of any race.
Race / Ethnicity (NH = Non-Hispanic)	Pop 2000	Pop 2010	Pop 2020	% 2000	% 2010	% 2020
White alone (NH)	243	191	121	14.96%	10.98%	7.00%
Black or African American alone (NH)	9	18	31	0.55%	1.04%	1.79%
Native American or Alaska Native alone (NH)	4	0	6	0.25%	0.00%	0.35%
Asian alone (NH)	30	13	12	1.85%	0.75%	0.69%
Native Hawaiian or Pacific Islander alone (NH)	2	2	0	0.12%	0.12%	0.00%
Other race alone (NH)	0	1	7	0.00%	0.06%	0.40%
Mixed race or Multiracial (NH)	12	25	19	0.74%	1.44%	1.10%
Hispanic or Latino (any race)	1,324	1,489	1,533	81.53%	85.62%	88.66%
Total	1,624	1,739	1,729	100.00%	100.00%	100.00%

=== 2020 census ===
As of the 2020 census, Seeley had a population of 1,729. The population density was 1,223.6 inhabitants per square mile (472.4/km^{2}). The racial makeup of Seeley was 415 (24.0%) White, 36 (2.1%) African American, 31 (1.8%) Native American, 20 (1.2%) Asian, 0 (0.0%) Pacific Islander, 765 (44.2%) from other races, and 462 (26.7%) from two or more races. Hispanic or Latino of any race were 1,533 persons (88.7%).

The whole population lived in households. There were 514 households, out of which 205 (39.9%) had children under the age of 18 living in them, 267 (51.9%) were married-couple households, 25 (4.9%) were cohabiting couple households, 141 (27.4%) had a female householder with no partner present, and 81 (15.8%) had a male householder with no partner present. 89 households (17.3%) were one person, and 42 (8.2%) were one person aged 65 or older. The average household size was 3.36. There were 402 families (78.2% of all households).

The age distribution was 487 people (28.2%) under the age of 18, 179 people (10.4%) aged 18 to 24, 395 people (22.8%) aged 25 to 44, 434 people (25.1%) aged 45 to 64, and 234 people (13.5%) who were 65 years of age or older. The median age was 33.2 years. For every 100 females, there were 94.9 males, and for every 100 females age 18 and over there were 92.0 males age 18 and over.

There were 539 housing units at an average density of 381.5 units per square mile (147.3 units/km^{2}), of which 514 (95.4%) were occupied. Of these, 242 (47.1%) were owner-occupied, and 272 (52.9%) were occupied by renters. The homeowner vacancy rate was 0.8% and the rental vacancy rate was 2.9%. 0.0% of residents lived in urban areas, while 100.0% lived in rural areas.

=== Income and poverty ===
In 2023, the US Census Bureau estimated that the median household income was $56,917, and the per capita income was $21,579. About 19.6% of families and 23.0% of the population were below the poverty line.

=== 2010 census ===
The 2010 United States census reported that Seeley had a population of 1,739. The population density was 1,399.9 inhabitants per square mile (540.5/km^{2}). The racial makeup of Seeley was 746 (42.9%) White, 19 (1.1%) African American, 7 (0.4%) Native American, 21 (1.2%) Asian, 2 (0.1%) Pacific Islander, 793 (45.6%) from other races, and 151 (8.7%) from two or more races. Hispanic or Latino of any race were 1,489 persons (85.6%).

The Census reported that 1,739 people (100% of the population) lived in households, 0 (0%) lived in non-institutionalized group quarters, and 0 (0%) were institutionalized.

There were 493 households, out of which 276 (56.0%) had children under the age of 18 living in them, 268 (54.4%) were opposite-sex married couples living together, 114 (23.1%) had a female householder with no husband present, 28 (5.7%) had a male householder with no wife present. There were 40 (8.1%) unmarried opposite-sex partnerships, and 2 (0.4%) same-sex married couples or partnerships. 66 households (13.4%) were made up of individuals, and 27 (5.5%) had someone living alone who was 65 years of age or older. The average household size was 3.53. There were 410 families (83.2% of all households); the average family size was 3.83.

The population was spread out, with 577 people (33.2%) under the age of 18, 195 people (11.2%) aged 18 to 24, 421 people (24.2%) aged 25 to 44, 373 people (21.4%) aged 45 to 64, and 173 people (9.9%) who were 65 years of age or older. The median age was 28.5 years. For every 100 females, there were 95.4 males. For every 100 females age 18 and over, there were 85.3 males.

There were 556 housing units at an average density of 447.6 per square mile (172.8/km^{2}), of which 493 were occupied, of which 246 (49.9%) were owner-occupied, and 247 (50.1%) were occupied by renters. The homeowner vacancy rate was 5.3%; the rental vacancy rate was 10.5%. 892 people (51.3% of the population) lived in owner-occupied housing units and 847 people (48.7%) lived in rental housing units.

== Politics ==
In the state legislature, Seeley is in the 18th senatorial district, represented by Democrat Steve Padilla, and the 36th Assembly district, represented by Republican Jeff Gonzalez.

Federally, Seeley is in California's 25th congressional district, represented by Democrat Raul Ruiz.

== Infrastructure ==
Seeley County Water District, a special district, provides water and sewer service to Seeley.

== California Historical Landmark ==
Near Seeley is California Historical Landmark number 1008, Yuha Well. Juan Bautista de Anza visited the well on March 8, 1774.

The California Historical Landmark marker reads:

NO. 1008 YUHA WELL - Known as Santa Rosa de Las Lajas (Flat Rocks), this site was used on March 8, 1774 by the Anza Exploring Expedition, opening the land route from Sonora, Mexico, to Alta California. On December 11 to 15, 1775, the three divisions of Anza's colonizing expedition used this first good watering spot beyond the Colorado River on the way from Sonora to San Francisco.

== See also ==
- San Diego–Imperial, California
- El Centro Metropolitan Area
- California Historical Landmarks in Imperial County
- Spanish missions in Arizona
- Spanish missions in the Sonoran Desert
- Spanish missions in Baja California
- California Historical Landmark
