= El Centro, California =

City in California, United States

- City
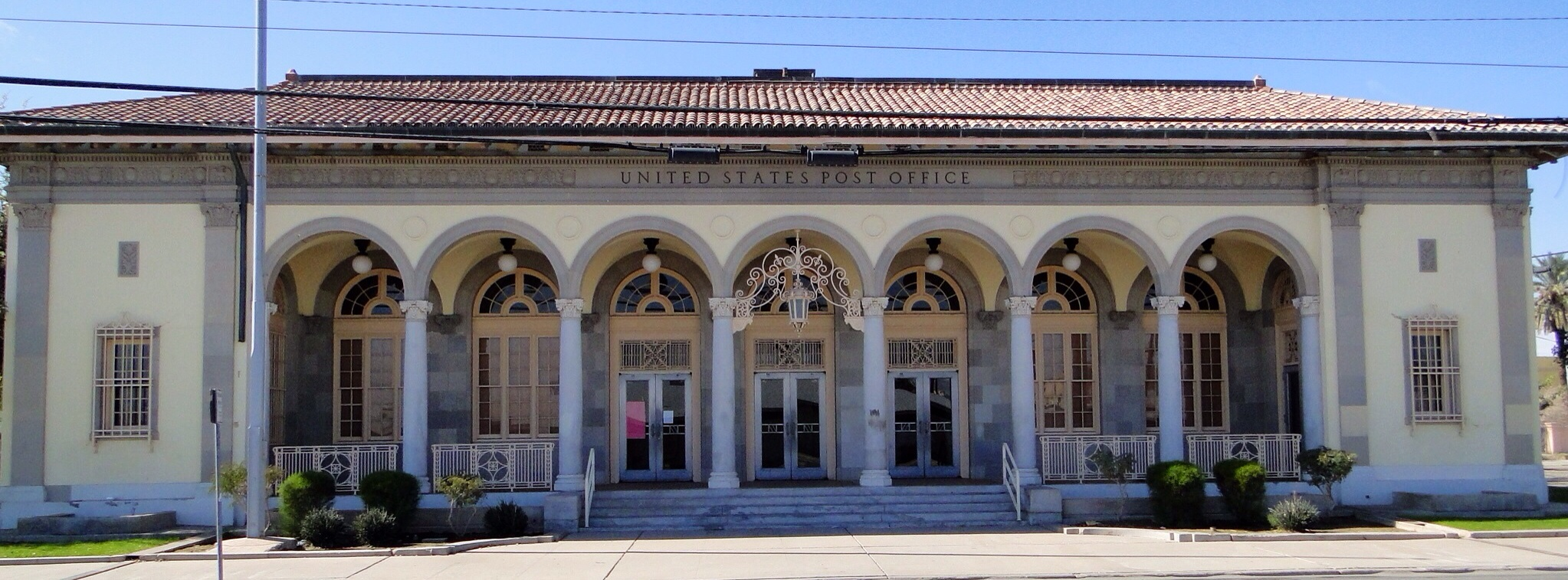
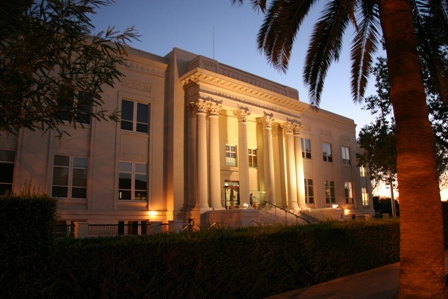
- Top: U.S. Post Office; Bottom: Imperial County Superior Courthouse

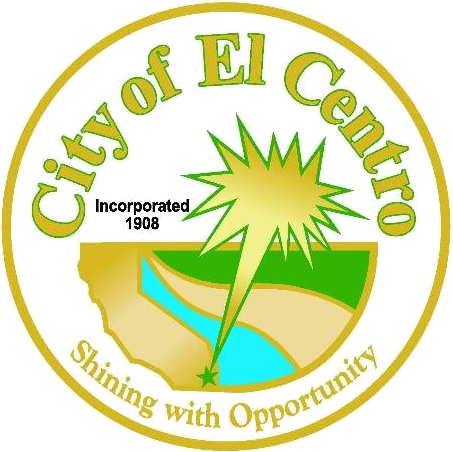
- Seal
- Interactive map of El Centro, California
- Location in southern California Location in California Location in the United States
- Coordinates: 32°48′N 115°34′W
- Country: United States
- State: California
- County: Imperial
- Incorporated: April 16, 1908

Government
  - Mayor: Sonia Carter

Area
  - Total: 11.86 sq mi (30.72 km^{2})
  - Land: 11.84 sq mi (30.67 km^{2})
  - Water: 0.019 sq mi (0.05 km^{2}) 0.16%
- Elevation: −39 ft (−12 m)

Population (2020)
  - Total: 44,322
  - Density: 3,722.1/sq mi (1,437.12/km^{2})
- Time zone: UTC-08:00 (PST)
  - Summer (DST): UTC-07:00 (PDT)
- ZIP codes: 92243-92244
- Area codes: 442/760
- FIPS code: 06-21782
- GNIS feature IDs: 1656501, 2410409
- Website: www.cityofelcentro.org

El Centro (Spanish for "The Center") is a city in and the county seat of Imperial County, California, United States. El Centro is the most populous city in the Imperial Valley, the east anchor of the Southern California Border Region, and the core urban area and principal city of the El Centro metropolitan area which encompasses all of Imperial County. El Centro is also the most populous U.S. city to lie entirely below sea level (−42 feet or −13 meters). The city, located in southeastern California, is 113 miles (182 km) from San Diego and less than 20 miles (32 km) from the Mexican city of Mexicali.

The city was founded in 1906 by W. F. Holt and C.A. Barker, who purchased the land on which El Centro was eventually built for about $40 per acre ($100 per hectare) and invested $100,000 ($3,600,000 in 2025 dollars) in improvements. The modern city is home to retail, transportation, wholesale, and agricultural industries. There are also two international border crossings nearby for commercial and noncommercial vehicles. El Centro's census population as of 2020 was 44,322, up from 42,598 at the 2010 census.

== History ==
Spanish explorer Melchor Díaz was one of the first Europeans to visit the area around El Centro and Imperial Valley in 1540. The explorer Juan Bautista de Anza also explored the area in 1776 (an elementary school in El Centro now bears his name). Years later, after the Mexican–American War, the northern half of the valley was annexed by the U.S., while the southern half remained under Mexican rule. Small scale settlement in natural aquifer areas occurred in the early 19th century (the present-day site of Mexicali), but most permanent settlement (Anglo Americans on the U.S. side, Mexicans on the other side) was after 1900.

Originally part of San Diego County, the Imperial Valley was settled by farmers once water from the Colorado River was diverted via canals to irrigate the desert valley floor.

In 1906, the land on which El Centro was later built was purchased by W. F. Holt and C.A. Barker.

In 1907 Imperial County was split off from San Diego County; by then much of the valley was successfully irrigated.

Before the town began, the railroad had established a station and named the place Cabarker. The name honored C.A. Barker, a friend of the landowner. The first post office in El Centro opened in 1905.

The City of El Centro was incorporated on April 16, 1908. Early growth was rapid with the city's population reaching 1,610 by 1910 and more than tripling by 1920 to 5,646 people. One reason for this rapid early growth was El Centro's successful battle with the City of Imperial to become the county seat. In these early days, relationships among the cities of the Imperial Valley were often intensely competitive, reflecting the particular frontier character of the area and the fact that six cities within a twenty-mile radius were all established within one generation. These cities were in a horse race to win the prize of being the Valley's leading city and the intense competition is measured by the fact that it took twenty years to get a county fair started because of strong local loyalties on the County Board of Supervisors.

By the mid-1940s, El Centro had become the second largest city in the Imperial Valley, with a population of about 11,000 people. El Centro had also become the location of the Imperial Irrigation District (IID) administrative offices.

Agriculture has been an important industry within El Centro since the early 20th century. Due to its strategic location near rail lines and U.S. Highways 80 and 99, more than 35 growers and shippers still operate in El Centro. However, by the early 1980s the two largest employment sectors in El Centro were government and wholesale/retail trade, reflecting El Centro's emerging role as a regional administrative and commercial center.

=== Natural disasters ===
El Centro has experienced a range of natural disasters, most notably earthquakes, due to its location in the seismically active Imperial Valley near the San Andreas Fault system. The region is also vulnerable to extreme heat, droughts, and occasional flooding.

One of the most significant events in recent history was the 2010 Baja California earthquake, also known as the Easter Sunday earthquake. On April 4, 2010, a magnitude 7.2 quake struck near Guadalupe Victoria, Mexico, just south of the U.S. border. The tremor lasted nearly 90 seconds and was widely felt across Southern California, including El Centro, where it caused structural damage to homes, mobile parks, public buildings, and water infrastructure. Liquefaction-related failures were reported in several areas, including the Calexico Wastewater Treatment Plant, Sunbeam Lake Dam, and levee systems near El Centro.

The quake also led to the demolition of several iconic structures, including the El Centro Public Library and the old water tower on Eighth Street and Vine Avenue, which had become unsafe. Emergency shelters were activated, and city officials worked to secure federal assistance, though FEMA support was limited. The disaster prompted long-term recovery efforts and the eventual construction of a new library funded by local sales tax measures.

Other notable seismic events include the 1940 El Centro earthquake (magnitude 6.9), which was the first major quake recorded by a strong-motion seismograph near a fault rupture, and the 1979 Imperial Valley earthquake, which caused widespread damage and fires. The region continues to be monitored closely by geologists due to its complex fault systems and history of seismic activity.

== Sites of interest ==
Stark Field is home of a minor league baseball team El Centro Imperials of the Arizona Summer League.

== Geography ==
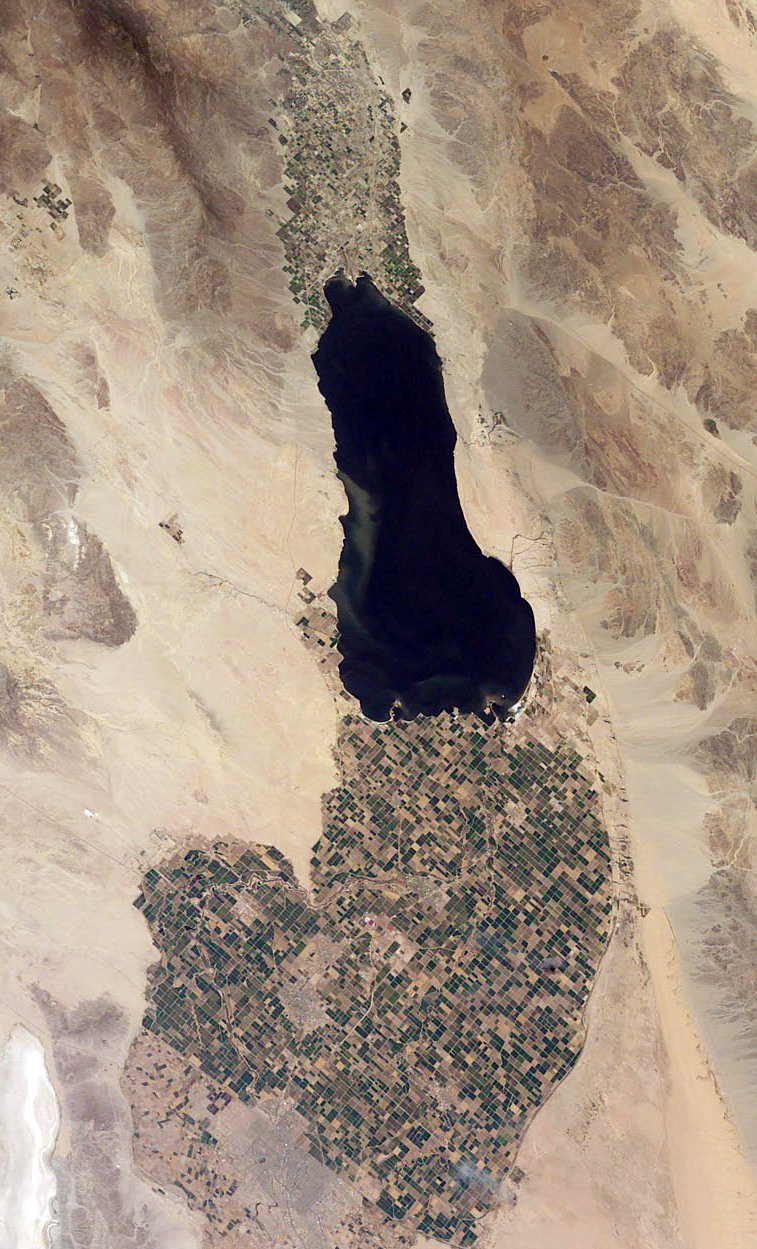
The Imperial Valley, as seen from the Space Shuttle. North is to the upper right. The Salton Sea is at the center. The US-Mexican border is a diagonal in the lower left.

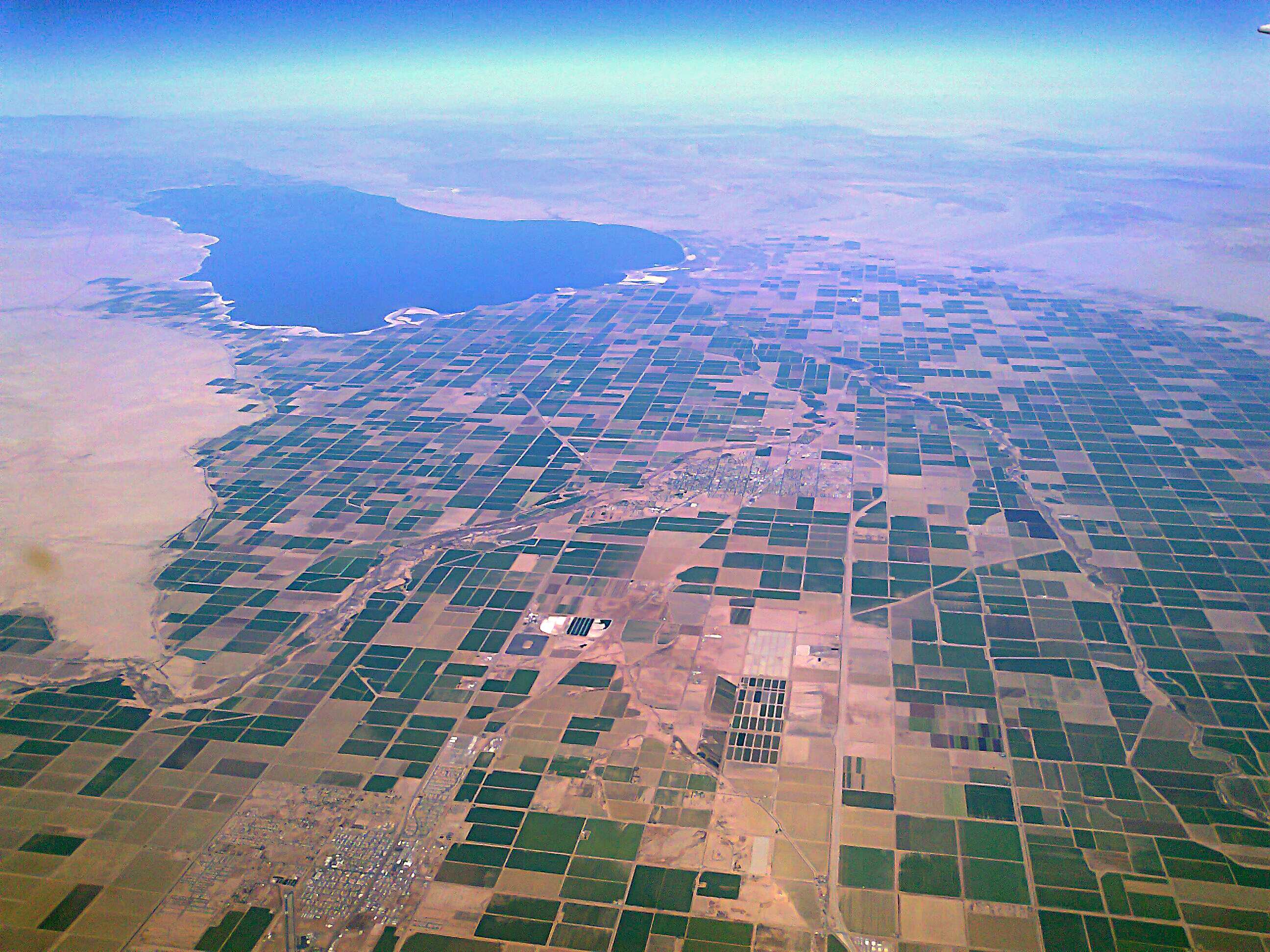
Aerial view of Imperial Valley and Salton Sea.

According to the United States Census Bureau, the city has a total area of 11.1 square miles (29 km^{2}), of which over 99% is land.

El Centro is located in the Imperial Valley (considered locally as synonymous with Imperial County). The city is 50 feet (15 m) below sea level and the largest city in the United States below sea level. The Imperial Valley is in the Colorado Desert, an extension of the larger Sonoran Desert.

The agriculture industry's demand for water is supplied by canals diverting water from the nearby Colorado River. The Salton Sea was created after a 1905 flood from the Colorado River.

The El Centro earthquake of 1940 had a moment magnitude of 6.9 and a maximum perceived intensity of X (Extreme) on the Mercalli intensity scale. It was the first major earthquake to be recorded by a strong-motion seismograph located next to a fault rupture. It was intensely studied by structural engineers and assumed to be typical until the Northridge earthquake of 1994. In this region, the geology is dominated by the transition of the tectonic plate boundary from rift to transverse fault. The southernmost strands of the San Andreas Fault connect the northernmost extensions of the East Pacific Rise. Consequently, the region is subject to earthquakes, and the crust is being stretched, resulting in a sinking of the terrain over time.

=== Climate ===
El Centro has a hot desert climate (Köppen climate classification: BWh) and is the southernmost desert city below sea level in the continental United States. It features long, extremely hot summers, and mild winters. El Centro has over 350 days of sunshine and under 3 inches (76 mm) of rain annually. Winter temperatures are in the mid to high 60s °F (mid to high teens °C) with over-night lows in the low 40s °F (mid +0s °C) . During summer days of June; typically the driest month of the year with no precipitation, the dry, desert heat can push temperatures well above 100 °F (37.8 °C), while the nights stay in the high 70s °F (high 20s °C).

The North American Monsoon typically increases moisture. At times, the climate can resemble that of tropical areas in the Caribbean due to Gulf of California moisture surges. Humid air from the gulf surges northward into the Imperial Valley and El Centro area, making the summer heat oppressive at times. This leads to daily thunderstorms that can bring hail, downpours, lightning, and dust storms, more commonly known as Haboob.

During the Eastern Pacific Hurricane season, remnants of hurricanes or tropical storms may track through the desert and can result in heavy thunderstorms. This can lead to significantly higher than normal precipitation, at times bringing heavy rain. A few examples of this are Hurricane Hilary (2023) and Hurricane Nora (1997)

The precipitation in the winter months is predominantly rain showers from the occasional winter storms. At times these storms bring cold temperatures to El Centro and surrounding cities, and mountain snowfall to the nearby Mountains. El Niño and La Niña play a large role in how much rain falls in the winter, La Nina typically brings drier and cooler conditions to El Centro and surrounding areas. El Niño tends to being wetter weather and average temperatures.

Snow is almost totally unknown in the area. However, on December 12, 1934, a very powerful winter storm brought record cold and snowfall to El Centro and surrounding areas of the Imperial Valley. Snow began falling at 8:45 p.m. December 11 and by 5 a.m. the next day (December 12) 1 to 4 inches or 0.025 to 0.10 meters of snow had blanketed the desert floor.

Another instance of freezing precipitation was observed in December 1967 as a mix of sleet hail. On average there are about 15 days that dip below 40 °F or 4.4 °C.

Being below sea level, El Centro has warm afternoons and cold mornings in winter. The coldest daily maximum on record is 44 °F (6.7 °C) on December 14, 1967, and the mean for the coldest day is at 56.1 °F (13.4 °C) for the reference period between 1991 and 2020. The warmest low temperature on record is 98 °F (36.7 °C), recorded on August 30, 1976. The mean for the hottest night annually is at 87.2 °F (30.7 °C). The wettest "rain year" was from July 1977 to June 1978 with 7.19 inches or 182.6 millimeters and the driest from July 2001 to June 2002 with 0.02 inches or 0.5 millimeters.

Climate data for El Centro, California, 1991–2020 normals, extremes 1925–present
Month	Jan	Feb	Mar	Apr	May	Jun	Jul	Aug	Sep	Oct	Nov	Dec	Year
Record high °F (°C)	90 (32)	94 (34)	107 (42)	109 (43)	116 (47)	121 (49)	122 (50)	122 (50)	120 (49)	113 (45)	98 (37)	95 (35)	122 (50)
Mean maximum °F (°C)	80.1 (26.7)	83.7 (28.7)	91.9 (33.3)	98.9 (37.2)	104.7 (40.4)	111.8 (44.3)	115.0 (46.1)	114.2 (45.7)	110.6 (43.7)	102.6 (39.2)	90.8 (32.7)	79.6 (26.4)	116.4 (46.9)
Mean daily maximum °F (°C)	71.0 (21.7)	74.0 (23.3)	80.3 (26.8)	86.4 (30.2)	93.8 (34.3)	102.9 (39.4)	106.9 (41.6)	106.7 (41.5)	102.2 (39.0)	91.7 (33.2)	79.2 (26.2)	69.6 (20.9)	88.7 (31.5)
Daily mean °F (°C)	57.2 (14.0)	60.3 (15.7)	65.9 (18.8)	71.5 (21.9)	78.6 (25.9)	86.8 (30.4)	92.5 (33.6)	93.0 (33.9)	87.6 (30.9)	76.7 (24.8)	64.9 (18.3)	56.2 (13.4)	74.3 (23.5)
Mean daily minimum °F (°C)	43.4 (6.3)	46.7 (8.2)	51.6 (10.9)	56.7 (13.7)	63.3 (17.4)	70.7 (21.5)	78.0 (25.6)	79.3 (26.3)	73.0 (22.8)	61.7 (16.5)	50.7 (10.4)	42.8 (6.0)	59.8 (15.4)
Mean minimum °F (°C)	34.5 (1.4)	37.6 (3.1)	41.9 (5.5)	47.7 (8.7)	53.7 (12.1)	61.4 (16.3)	70.2 (21.2)	70.1 (21.2)	63.4 (17.4)	51.1 (10.6)	40.2 (4.6)	33.6 (0.9)	32.2 (0.1)
Record low °F (°C)	14 (−10)	22 (−6)	21 (−6)	33 (1)	36 (2)	42 (6)	52 (11)	54 (12)	48 (9)	33 (1)	24 (−4)	22 (−6)	14 (−10)
Average precipitation inches (mm)	0.39 (9.9)	0.43 (11)	0.29 (7.4)	0.07 (1.8)	0.04 (1.0)	0.00 (0.00)	0.08 (2.0)	0.23 (5.8)	0.25 (6.4)	0.21 (5.3)	0.17 (4.3)	0.37 (9.4)	2.53 (64)
Average precipitation days (≥ 0.01 in)	1.7	2.5	1.7	0.6	0.3	0.1	0.6	1.1	0.9	0.7	0.9	1.9	13.0
Average relative humidity (%)	45.1	39.6	33.1	25.0	21.3	16.5	21.1	25.6	25.0	28.8	37.2	45.0	30.3
Mean monthly sunshine hours	245.2	246.7	314.6	346.1	388.1	400.7	390.9	368.5	337.1	304.4	246.0	236.0	3,824.3
Percentage possible sunshine	79	81	85	88	89	92	88	88	87	85	80	78	86
Source 1:
Source 2: National Weather Service

== Economy ==
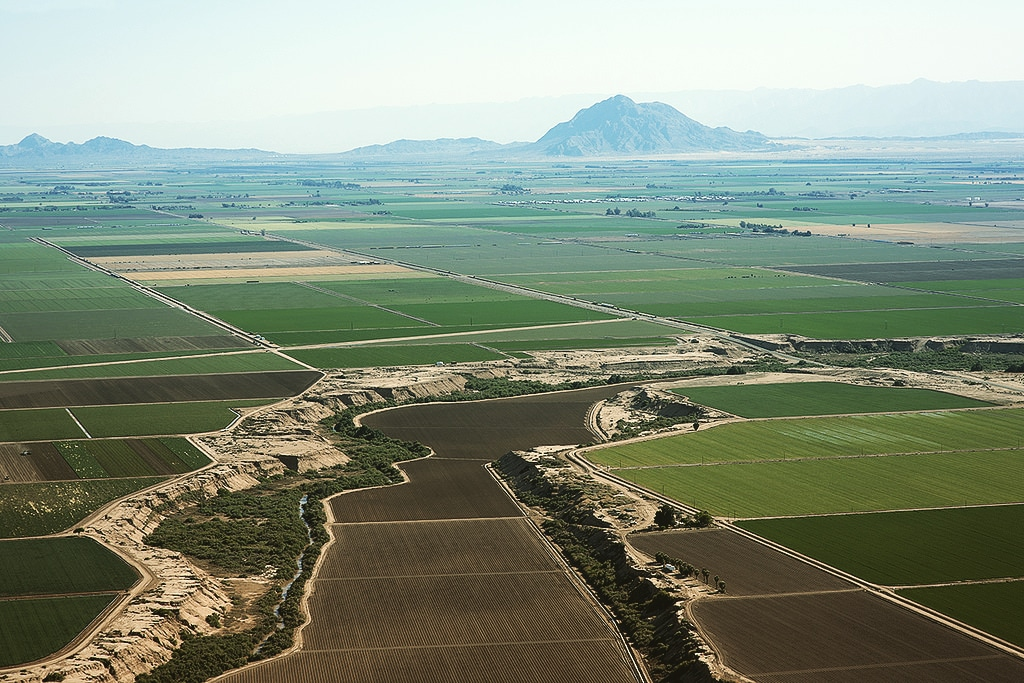
Aerial photo of fields, with Mount Signal in background (2017)

As of 2009 the employment of El Centro residents is dominated by the local government, California state government, and federal government. Two nearby prisons (Centinela and Calipatria) and a U.S. Border Patrol station provide employment; The Economist states that the prisons and border patrol were "relatively untouched" by the late-2000s recession. The El Centro area has many farming plots, where carrots, lettuce, and other crops are produced, and therefore the El Centro economy is subject to seasonal variations like other farming areas. Between November and March in winter periods, El Centro-area farmers harvest lettuce for $8–10 per hour. During March the harvest moves to the north and is no longer in El Centro; in previous eras farmers migrated, while in the first decade of the 21st century many collect unemployment benefits during the summer.

El Centro is surrounded by thousands of acres of farmland that has transformed the desert into one of the most productive farming regions in California with an annual crop production of over $1 billion. Agriculture is still the largest industry in Imperial County and accounts for 48% of all employment.

Being the commercial center of Imperial County, fifty percent of the jobs in the El Centro come from the service and retail sector.

A recent growth in the interest of Imperial County as a filming location, has spurred growth in servicing this industry. Due to its desert environment and proximity to Los Angeles, California, movies are sometimes filmed in the sand dunes outside the agricultural portions of the Imperial County. These have included Return of the Jedi, Stargate, The Scorpion King, Jarhead, Into the Wild, and American Sniper.

=== During the late-2000s recession ===
According to the Bureau of Labor Statistics, as of April 30, 2009, the El Centro area had a 25.0% unemployment rate, the highest for a Metropolitan Area in the country. By August of that year, El Centro's unemployment rate was 27.5%, three times the overall United States unemployment rate of 9.7%. The Economist stated that the city is not the "centre of the Great Recession" like the figure would appear to indicate. While El Centro has a seasonal farming economy, there is still a fixed "baseline" unemployment at 12%. Timothy Kelly, the head of the Imperial Valley Economic Development Corporation, estimated that between 40,000 and 60,000 residents of Mexicali work in El Centro. The Economist added that there are likely many El Centro residents who work in Mexicali and collect unemployment benefits in El Centro; Ruben Duran, the city manager of El Centro, said that if the Mexicali jobs were factored into the employment rate, El Centro would have a normal employment rate. The manager of a job search agency called One Stop, said that about 3,000 people per month come into her agency; she says that some make a genuine effort to find jobs, while many do not have motivation to actually find a job, but to instead show proof that they tried to find a job. Kelly stated that unemployment fraud does not account for all of the issues with the El Centro area; he said that many residents have a lack of education and a lack of English language proficiency, so some of them cannot find jobs. The Economist added that the collapse of the housing market eliminated some construction jobs; the magazine countered that the scenario is true in many places in the United States. In December 2008 listed as No. 5 on Forbes.com's list of "The Top 10 Places in America Where Homes are Losing their Value Fastest" with 31.4% of homeowners owing more on their mortgages than their homes are worth. A national report on the effects of the "Great recession" of 2008/09 has found El Centro and the Imperial Valley in the top 5 poorest medium-sized cities in the U.S. in poverty and unemployment rates.

== Parks and recreation ==
=== City parks ===
- City parks include:
  - Bucklin Park
  - Swarthout Field
  - Stark Field
  - Countryside Park
  - Legacy Park
  - Farmers Park
  - Lotus Park
  - Plank Park
  - First Responders Park
  - Sunflower Park
  - Carlos Aguilar Park
  - Debbie Pitman Park
  - Gomez Park
  - McGee Park

== Culture ==
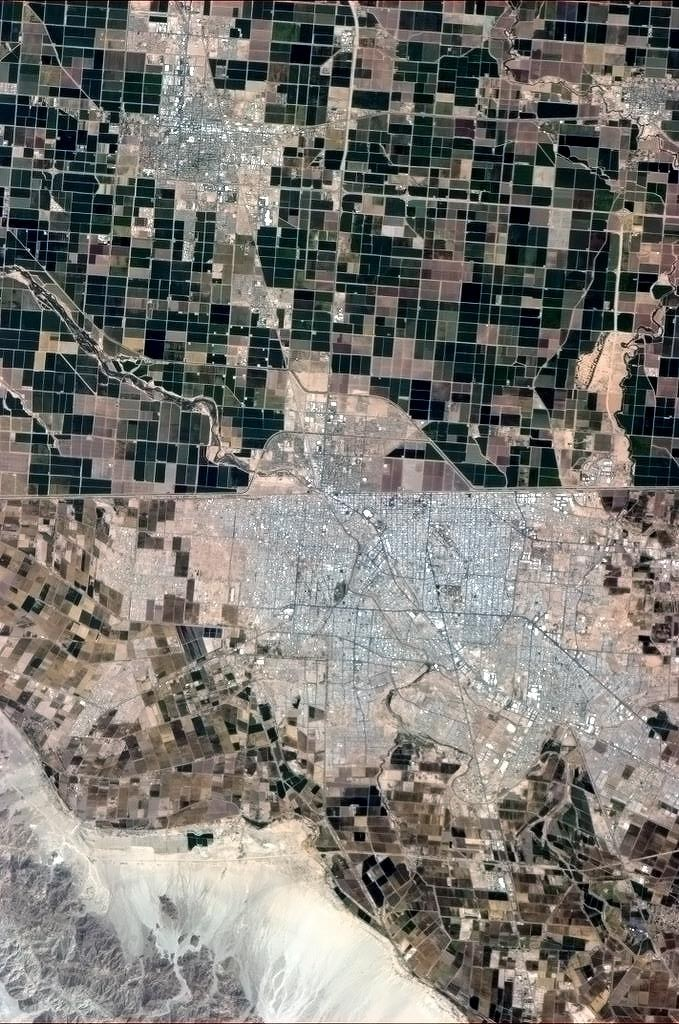
El Centro, seen here from the International Space Station, lies just north of Calexico and Mexicali and the Mexico-US border.

While the majority of the residents in this community are Hispanic, there is a diverse population with a wide array of interests. In the winter, residents race on nearby sand dunes using four-wheel-drive buggies. During the summer, residents spend time indoors instead of outside. Spanish is a dominant language among residents and over the radio. Many area residents live in both the United States and Mexico and go across the border frequently.

== Demographics ==
Historical population
Census	Pop.	Note	%±
1910	1,618		—
1920	5,790		257.8%
1930	8,437		45.7%
1940	10,174		20.6%
1950	12,548		23.3%
1960	16,830		34.1%
1970	19,973		18.7%
1980	24,829		24.3%
1990	32,192		29.7%
2000	37,294		15.8%
2010	42,598		14.2%
2020	44,322		4.0%
U.S. Decennial Census

=== 2020 census ===
As of the 2020 census, El Centro had a population of 44,322 and a population density of 3,742.8 inhabitants per square mile (1,445.1/km^{2}). The median age was 35.0 years. The age distribution was 26.7% under the age of 18, 9.8% aged 18 to 24, 25.3% aged 25 to 44, 23.5% aged 45 to 64, and 14.7% aged 65 or older. For every 100 females, there were 90.7 males, and for every 100 females age 18 and over there were 86.6 males age 18 and over.

The census reported that 99.0% of the population lived in households, 0.7% lived in non-institutionalized group quarters, and 0.3% were institutionalized. In addition, 99.7% of residents lived in urban areas and 0.3% lived in rural areas.

There were 14,137 households, of which 42.0% had children under the age of 18 living in them. Of all households, 47.3% were married-couple households, 5.7% were cohabiting couple households, 15.4% were households with a male householder and no spouse or partner present, and 31.7% were households with a female householder and no spouse or partner present. About 20.0% of households were made up of individuals, and 9.2% had someone living alone who was 65 years of age or older. The average household size was 3.1. There were 10,786 families (76.3% of all households).

There were 15,041 housing units at an average density of 1,270.1 units per square mile (490.4 units/km^{2}), of which 14,137 (94.0%) were occupied. Of these, 47.2% were owner-occupied, and 52.8% were occupied by renters. The remaining 6.0% of housing units were vacant. The homeowner vacancy rate was 1.0%, and the rental vacancy rate was 4.6%.

Racial composition as of the 2020 census
Race	Number	Percent
White	11,677	26.3%
Black or African American	890	2.0%
American Indian and Alaska Native	854	1.9%
Asian	802	1.8%
Native Hawaiian and Other Pacific Islander	36	0.1%
Some other race	16,987	38.3%
Two or more races	13,076	29.5%
Hispanic or Latino (of any race)	38,566	87.0%

=== 2023 ACS estimate ===
In 2023, the U.S. Census Bureau estimated that the median household income was $56,093, and the per capita income was $23,781. About 17.2% of families and 20.1% of the population were below the poverty line.

=== 2010 census ===
The 2010 United States census reported that El Centro had a population of 42,598. The population density was 3,838.1 inhabitants per square mile (1,481.9/km^{2}). The racial makeup of El Centro was 25,376 White, 1,081 African American, 554 Native American, 965 Asian, 34 Pacific Islander, 12,356 from other races, and 2,232 from two or more races. Hispanic or Latino of any race were 34,751 persons.

The Census reported that 41,782 people (98.1% of the population) lived in households, 296 (0.7%) lived in non-institutionalized group quarters, and 520 (1.2%) were institutionalized.

There were 13,108 households, out of which 6,257 (47.7%) had children under the age of 18 living in them, 6,550 (50.0%) were opposite-sex married couples living together, 2,845 (21.7%) had a female householder with no husband present, and 815 (6.2%) had a male householder with no wife present. There were 804 (6.1%) unmarried opposite-sex partnerships, and 58 (0.4%) same-sex married couples or partnerships. Of the households, 2,458 (18.8%) were made up of individuals, and 1,004 (7.7%) had someone living alone who was 65 years of age or older. The average household size was 3.19. There were 10,210 families (77.9% of all households); the average family size was 3.64.

The population was spread out, with 12,671 people (29.7%) under the age of 18, 4,803 people (11.3%) aged 18 to 24, 10,661 people (25.0%) aged 25 to 44, 9,907 people (23.3%) aged 45 to 64, and 4,556 people (10.7%) who were 65 years of age or older. The median age was 31.8 years. For every 100 females, there were 94.7 males. For every 100 females age 18 and over, there were 90.3 males.

There were 14,476 housing units at an average density of 1,304.3 units per square mile (503.6 units/km^{2}), of which 13,108 were occupied, of which 6,488 (49.5%) were owner-occupied, and 6,620 (50.5%) were occupied by renters. The homeowner vacancy rate was 2.8%; the rental vacancy rate was 7.2%. 21,429 people (50.3% of the population) lived in owner-occupied housing units and 20,353 people (47.8%) lived in rental housing units.

=== 2009 immigration ===
In 2009 the Latinos in El Centro mainly consisted of dual citizens and permanent resident card (green card) holders. Illegal immigrants tended to go through Imperial County instead of staying in Imperial County.

== Education ==
Within its boundary, there are three school districts – McCabe Union Elementary School District, El Centro School District and Central Union High School District.

El Centro has 11 elementary schools, four middle/junior high schools and three high schools:

=== Elementary schools ===
- De Anza Magnet School
- Desert Gardens Elementary School
- Harding Elementary School
- Hedrick Elementary School (named after Margaret Hedrick, a woman who had been teaching and working in schools for 55 years, 35 of them in the El Centro School District).
- Martin Luther King Elementary School
- Lincoln Elementary School
- McCabe Elementary School
- McKinley Elementary School
- Meadows Elementary School
- Sunflower Elementary
- Washington Elementary School
- St. Mary's Catholic School

=== Middle and junior high schools ===
- Corfman Middle School (Grades 4–8)
- Kennedy Middle School
- Wilson Junior High
- St. Mary's Catholic School

=== High schools ===
The Central Union High School District includes two four-year comprehensive high schools (Central Union and Southwest) and one alternative education school (Desert Oasis). The school district's 3,450 students are supported by more than 350 certified and classified staff. The District is governed by a five-member Board of Trustees.

- Central Union High School (Central Union was established near the time when the city was established and celebrated its centennial in 2008.)
- Desert Oasis High School
- Southwest High School, whose performing arts theater is named after local musician Jimmie Cannon, director of CUHS's Great Spartan Band from 1966 to 1996

=== Colleges and universities ===
Opportunities to attend college are available through Imperial Valley College, a local 2-year college, and an extension of San Diego State University located in the nearby city of Calexico. San Diego State University's Calexico Campus offers a variety of bachelor's and master's degrees.

== Transportation ==
=== Freeways and highways ===
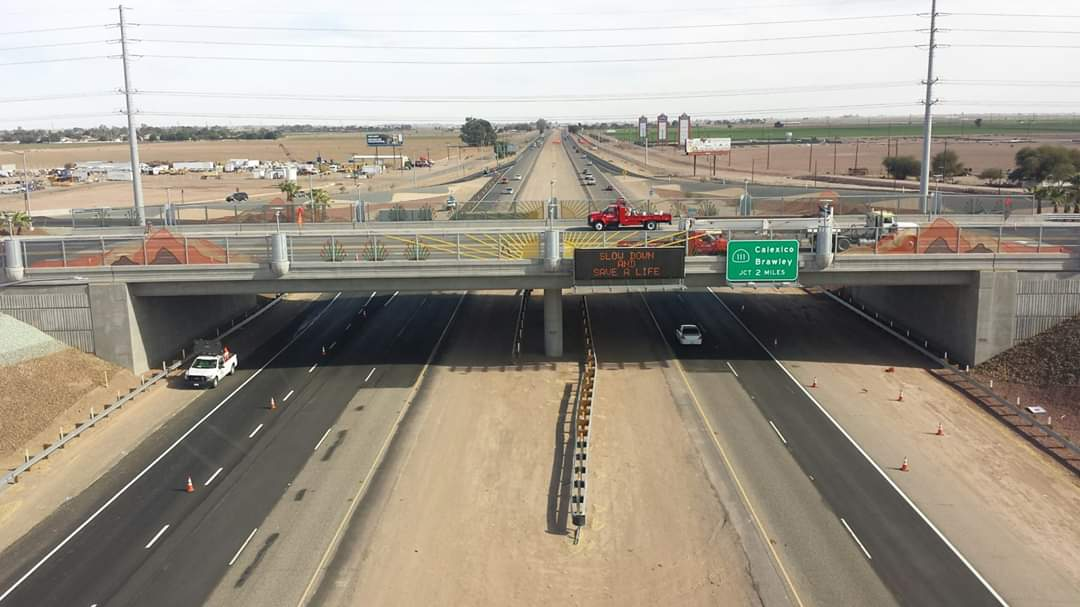
Dogwood Bridge over Interstate 8 in El Centro

There are three major highways that serve El Centro. Interstate 8 connects San Diego to the west and Yuma, Arizona to the east. State Route 86 and State Route 111 parallel each other as they go north to Brawley before running along the west and east shores of the Salton Sea, respectively, on their way to the Coachella Valley. Going south from El Centro, State Route 86 terminates at State Route 111, which runs to Calexico and Mexicali, Mexico.

=== Public transportation ===
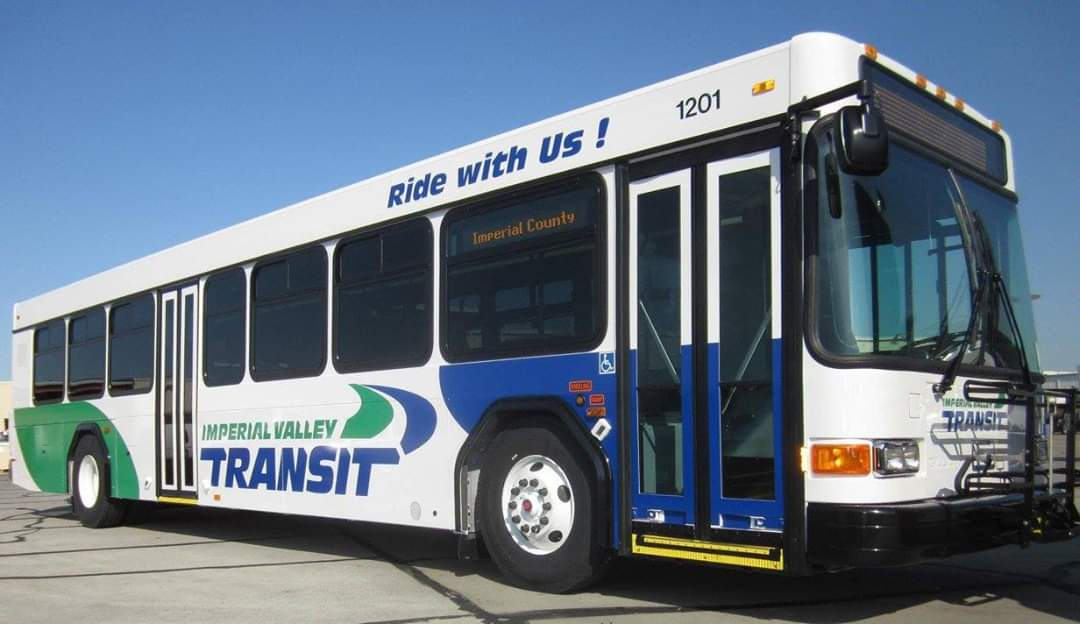
Imperial Valley Transit bus

Imperial Valley Transit is the primary provider of mass transportation in the Imperial Valley. Formed in 1989 with just 3 buses and serving just 3,000 people per month, the agency now currently serves more than 73,000 riders within the area per month.

Through a partnership between the Imperial County Transportation Commission (ICTC), the Yuma County Intergovernmental Public Transportation Authority (YCIPTA), and the Quechan Indian Tribe, Yuma County Area Transit Turquoise Route 10 buses stop at El Centro locations and connects the city to Winterhaven, California and Yuma, Arizona.

Greyhound Lines provides intercity bus service to El Centro.

=== Airports ===
- Imperial County Airport is located in nearby Imperial. Service is subsidized by the Essential Air Service program. The nearest large international airports are San Diego International Airport and Mexicali International Airport.
- Naval Air Facility El Centro is a U.S. Navy airfield
- Douthitt Strip Airport is a former military airfield, now a private use airport.

== Politics ==
El Centro operates under a council–manager form of government. The members of the City Council also sit as the Community Development Commission (Commission) and Redevelopment Agency (Agency) governing boards. The City Manager is empowered as the executive director of the Commission and Agency.

In the state legislature, El Centro is in the 18th senatorial district, represented by Democrat Steve Padilla, and the 36th Assembly district, represented by Republican Jeff Gonzalez.

Federally, El Centro is in California's 25th congressional district, represented by Democrat Raul Ruiz.

== Government ==
The City of El Centro Public Works operates water, sewer, and trash services for the city.

== Notable people ==
Notable people from El Centro or who lived in El Centro for an extended period of time.

- Walter Beasley (born 1961), jazz musician and professor
- Justin Burquist, filmmaker and music video director
- Glenn Cadrez (born 1970), former American football linebacker for the Denver Broncos
- Julian Segura Camacho (born 1969), Mexican American literature author
- Dino Cazares (born 1966) heavy metal musician, songwriter, and producer
- Cher (born 1946), pop musician, actress
- Roscoe Cook (1939–2011), holder of three world records in track
- Uttam Dhillon, former acting Administrator of the DEA
- Doug Harvey (1930–2018), Major League Baseball Hall of Fame umpire
- Ken Howard (1944–2016), actor
- Donal Logue (born 1966), actor
- Emmy Lou Packard (1914–1998), fine artist, printmaker
- Kyle Richards (born 1969), actress
