= Central Union High School District =

School district in California, United States

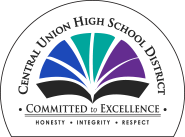

Location
- El Centro, California United States
- Coordinates: 32°46′51.8″N 115°33′03.3″W

District information
- Type: Public
- Motto: Committed to excellence
- Grades: 9 through 12
- Superintendent: Ward Andrus
- Schools: 3
- NCES District ID: 0608010

Students and staff
- Students: 4,140 (2020–21)
- Teachers: 193.84 (on an FTE basis)
- Student–teacher ratio: 21.36:1

Other information
- Teachers' union(s): El Centro Secondary Teachers Association
- Schedule: M-F except some legal holidays
- Website: www.cuhsd.net

The Central Union High School District (CUHSD) is the district of the 3 high schools in El Centro, California — Central Union High School (CUHS), Southwest High School (SHS), and Desert Oasis High School (DOHS). The CUHSD main office and boardroom are located adjacent to DOHS.

== Governance ==
The Central Union School District is governed by a five-member board of trustees, which appoints a superintendent and other administrators, who run the daily operations of the district. Members of the board are elected at-large by voters from the communities that the CUHSD serves. Members of the board serve for a term of four years, with two or three seats up for election every two years.

Trustee	Current term expires
Todd Evangelist	2018
Emma L. Jones (President)	2018
Jacinto Jimenez	2020
Diahna Garcia-Ruiz (Clerk)	2020
Ryan D. Childers	2020

== 2016 School Bond Ballot Measure ==
On March 8, 2016 the board of trustees unanimously voted to place Measure K, officially titled Central Union High School District Classroom Repair/School Safety Measure, on the June 7, 2016 ballot for voters living within the District, alongside the 2016 California presidential primary election. The subsequent approval of Measure K allows the CUHSD to issue $30,000,000 in local general obligation bonds in order to make repairs to old, deteriorating classrooms and buildings and upgrade classrooms, computer systems, science labs and vocational training rooms with the aim of improving student learning and achievement.

Measure K
Choice	Votes	%
For	5,661	70.17
Against	2,406	29.83
Required majority		55
Total	8,067	100.00
Source: Imperial County Registrar of Voters

== Boundary ==
High school students living on post at Naval Air Facility El Centro (dependents of military personnel) attend Southwest HS.
