= Thermal low =

Low-pressure areas that occur over the subtropics

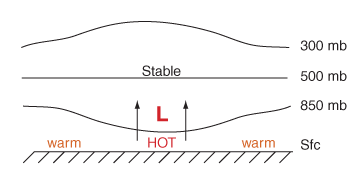
Vertical cross-section of a thermal low

Thermal lows, or heat lows, are non-frontal low-pressure areas that occur over the continents in the subtropics during the warm season, as the result of intense heating when compared to their surrounding environments. Thermal lows occur near the Sonoran Desert, on the Mexican Plateau, in California's Great Central Valley, in the Sahara, in the Kalahari, over north-west Argentina, in South America, over the Kimberley region of north-west Australia, over the Iberian Peninsula, and over the Tibetan Plateau.

On land, intense, rapid solar heating of the Earth's surface causes the heating of the lowest layers of the atmosphere, via re-radiated energy in the infrared spectrum. The hotter air is less dense than surrounding cooler air and rises, leading to the formation of a low-pressure area. Elevated areas can enhance the strength of the thermal low because they warm more quickly than the atmosphere which surrounds them at the same altitude. Over water, instability lows form during the winter when the air overlying the land is colder than the warmer water body.

Thermal lows can extend to 3,100 metres (10,200 ft) in height and tend to have weak circulations. Thermal lows over the western and southern portions of North America, northern Africa, and Southeast Asia are strong enough to lead to summer monsoon conditions. Thermal lows inland of the coastline lead to the development of sea breezes which, combined with rugged topography near the coast, can lead to poor air quality. Owing to the very high temperatures in the centre of heat lows, there are relatively few direct observations of thermal lows.

== Formation ==
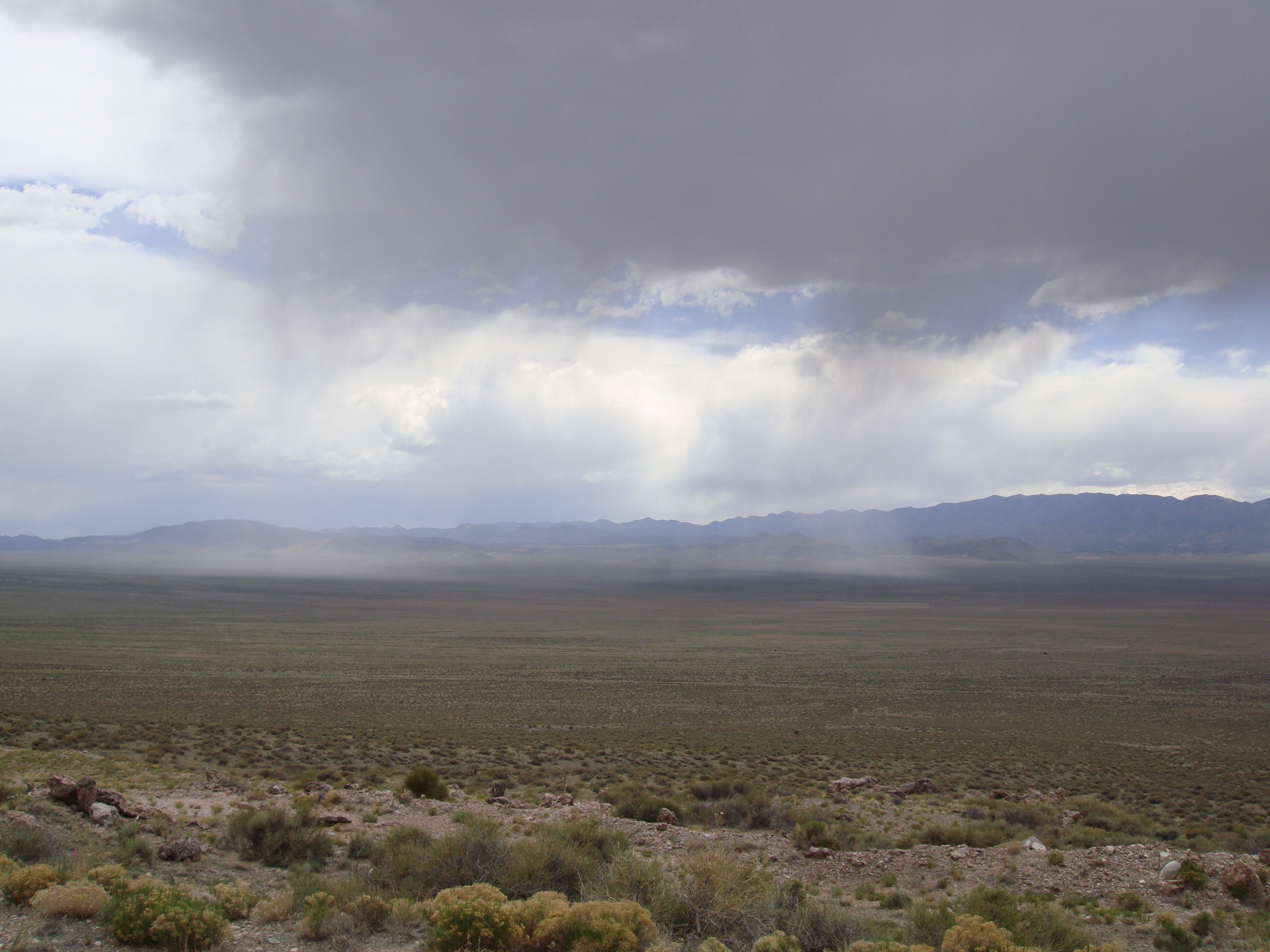
An isolated thunderstorm rolls through Wah Wah Valley, Utah. This type of monsoonal pattern is very common in the late summer of the southwest US.

In deserts, the lack of ground and plant moisture, that would normally provide evaporative cooling, can lead to intense, rapid solar heating of the lower layers of air. The hot air is less dense than surrounding cooler air. That, combined with the rise of the hot air, results in a low pressure area called a thermal low. Over elevated surfaces, heating of the ground exceeds the heating of the surrounding air at the same altitude above sea level, which creates an associated heat low over the terrain, and enhances any thermal lows which would have otherwise existed. During the cold season, (winter), warm water bodies such as the Great Lakes can induce an instability low. Thermal lows which develop near sea level can build in height during the warm season, or summer, to the elevation of the 700 hPa pressure surface, which lies near 3,100 metres (10,200 ft) above sea level. Heat lows normally are stationary and have a weak cyclonic circulation. As they are strongest at the surface and warm near their center, and weaker aloft where the air is more stable, the thermal low is considered warm core. The strongest versions of these features globally are over Arabia, the northern portion of the Indian subcontinent, Arizona, Mexican Plateau, northwest Argentina, southwestern Spain, Australia, and northern Africa. The formation of the heat low over northern Africa leads to a low-level westerly jet stream from June into October.

== Role in the monsoon regime ==
Onset dates and prevailing wind currents of the southwest summer monsoon

Monsoons are caused by the larger amplitude of the seasonal cycle of land temperature compared to that of nearby oceans. That differential warming happens because heat in the ocean is mixed vertically through a "mixed layer" that may be fifty meters deep, due to the action of wind and buoyancy-generated turbulence, whereas the land surface conducts heat slowly, with the seasonal signal penetrating perhaps a meter or so. Additionally, the specific heat capacity of liquid water is significantly higher than that of most materials that make up land. Together, those factors mean that the heat capacity of the layer involved in the seasonal cycle is much larger over the oceans than over land, meaning that the air over the land warms faster and reaches a higher temperature than the air over the ocean. The hot air over the land tends to rise, creating an area of low pressure. That creates a steady wind blowing toward the land, bringing the moist near-surface ocean air with it. Similar rainfall is caused by the moist ocean air being lifted upwards by mountains, surface heating, convergence at the surface, divergence aloft, or from storm-produced outflows at the surface. However when the lifting occurs, the air cools due expansion in lower pressure, which in turn produces condensation.

In winter, the land cools off quickly, but the ocean retains its heat longer due to its higher specific heat. The hot air over the ocean rises, creating a low pressure area and a breeze from land to ocean while a large area of drying high pressure is formed over the land, increased by wintertime cooling. Monsoons are similar to sea and land breezes, a term usually referring to the localized, diurnal (daily) cycle of circulation near coastlines everywhere, but they are much larger in scale, much stronger, and seasonal.

== Role in sea breeze formation ==
Schematic cross section through a sea breeze front. If the air inland is moist, cumulus often marks the front's location.

The sea is warmed by the sun to a greater depth than the land due to its greater specific heat. The sea therefore has a greater capacity for absorbing heat than the land, so the surface of the sea warms up more slowly than the land's surface. As the temperature of the surface of the land rises, the land heats the air above it. The less dense warm air rises, which lowers the sea level pressure by about 0.2%. The cooler air above the sea, with higher sea level pressure, flows towards the land into the area of lower pressure, creating a cooler breeze near the coast. The strength of the sea breeze is directly proportional to the temperature difference between the land and the sea. If the environmental wind field is greater than 8 knots (15 km/h) and opposing the direction of a possible sea breeze, the sea breeze is not likely to develop.

Along the California coast, the cooler water creates a surface marine layer that is much cooler than inland areas during the summer. At the same time, the intense heating inland generates a pronounced thermal trough aligned with the Central Valley, and typically linked to the broader thermal low across the North American deserts. As a consequence, a strong pressure gradient is created which draws cool marine air landward. As temperatures plummet, fog and stratus stream in and through the gaps of the Coast Ranges, and especially through the Golden Gate at San Francisco (see San Francisco fog). The same thermal trough is sometimes pushed toward the coast, especially in late fall, when higher pressure develops to the east due to cooling even further east. That situation often brings the warmest temperatures of the year to the normally cool coastline, because the sea breeze stops or is even replaced by a dangerously dry land breeze (see also Diablo wind and Santa Ana wind).

== Role in air pollution ==
In hilly or mountainous areas near the coastline, thermally-forced sea breezes, combined with wind circulations up the sides of the mountains, can encourage the production of chemicals which can lead to the development of smog. Pollution has been tracked into the mid-levels of the troposphere in the form of ozone, which is concentrated over the circulation of the thermal low as well as adjacent oceanic areas.
