= J. J. O'Connell =

J. J. O'Connell may refer to:

- J. J. "Ginger" O'Connell (1887–1944), Irish revolutionary
- Joseph J. O'Connell (1905–1983), American lawyer and government official

== See also ==
- Jerry J. O'Connell (1909–1956), American attorney and politician
- John J. O'Connell (politician), American attorney and politician from Washington
- John J. O'Connell (police officer) (1884–1946), New York policeman
- John Joseph O'Connell (1894–1949), American federal judge
- Joseph John O'Connell (1861–1959), engineer and inventor
