= Winterhaven, California =

Winterhaven
- Unincorporated community Census-designated place
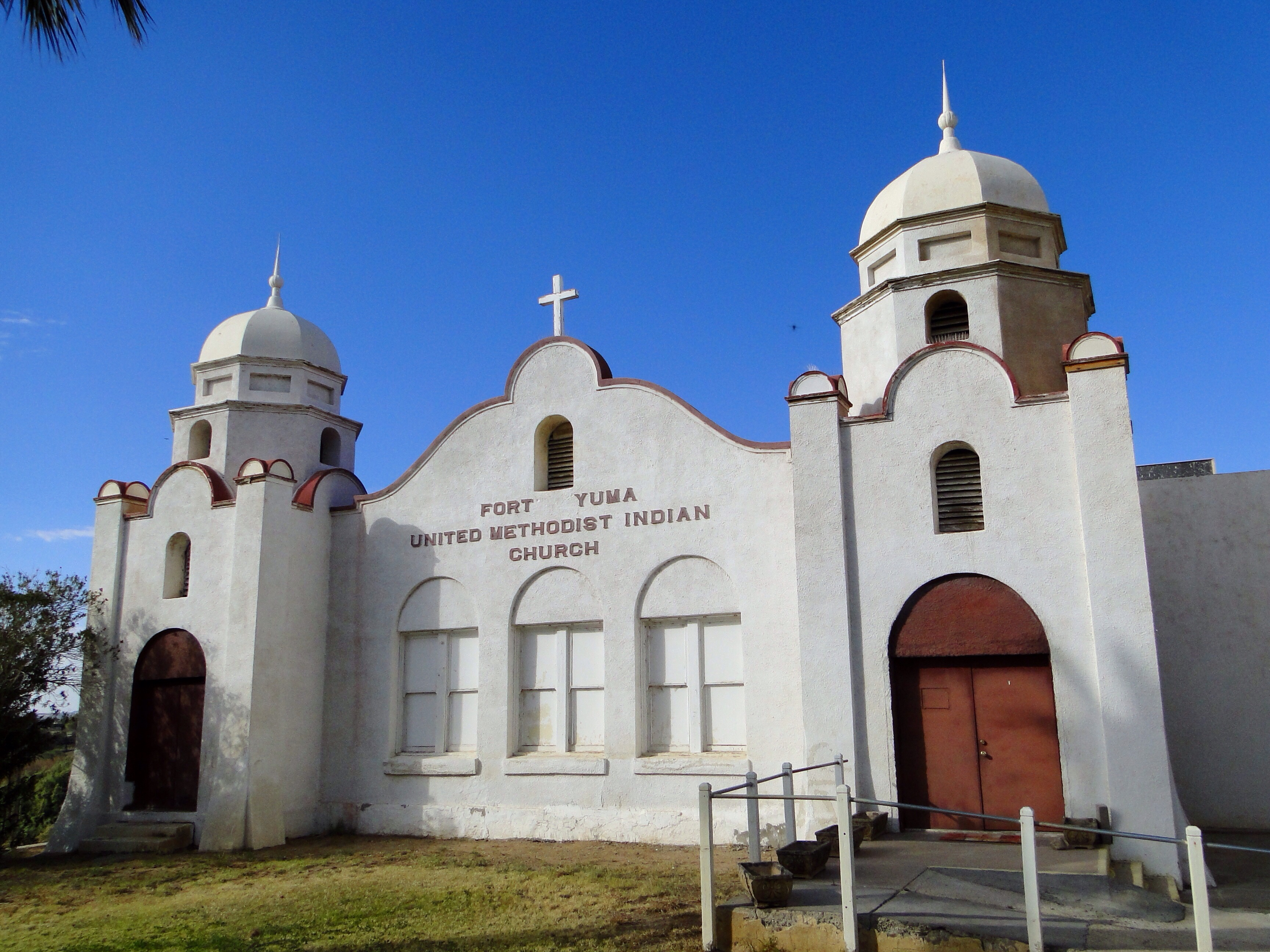
- Fort Yuma United Methodist Indian Church

- Location in Imperial County and the state of California

- Location in Southern California Location in California Location in the United States
- Coordinates: 32°44′22″N 114°38′05″W
- Country: United States
- State: California
- County: Imperial

Area
  - Total: 0.244 sq mi (0.632 km^{2})
  - Land: 0.244 sq mi (0.632 km^{2})
  - Water: 0 sq mi (0 km^{2}) 0%
- Elevation: 130 ft (40 m)

Population (2020)
  - Total: 390
  - Density: 1,600/sq mi (620/km^{2})
- Time zone: UTC-7 (PDT)
- ZIP code: 92283
- Area codes: 442/760
- FIPS code: 06-86020
- GNIS feature IDs: 1661702, 2409615

Winterhaven (formerly Karmack) is a census-designated place (CDP) in Imperial County, California. Winterhaven is 6.5 miles (10 km) east of Pilot Knob, The population was 390 at the 2020 census. It is part of the El Centro, CA Metropolitan Area. North of Interstate 8 and bordering Yuma, Arizona, the town is partly in the Fort Yuma Indian Reservation. The Colorado River marks the town's southern border.

== Telephone and mail service ==
Telephone service is provided by Winterhaven Telephone Company, a subsidiary of TDS Telecom, and wired telephones in the area have numbers following the format (760) 572-xxxx. These numbers are assigned to subscribers in Winterhaven, Bard, and Felicity.

The communities of Bard and Felicity appear in the US Geological Survey, National Geographic Names Database, and the US Postal Service database and adjoin the community of Winterhaven. The communities of Felicity and Winterhaven share a ZIP code: 92283. Bard does not have postal delivery, and post office boxes for the community have a ZIP code of 92222.

The first post office at Winterhaven operated from 1916 to 1921. It was re-established in 1934.

== Geography ==
According to the United States Census Bureau, the CDP has a total area of 0.24 square miles (0.62 km^{2}), all land. Winterhaven is the southeasternmost settlement in California.

=== Climate ===
This area has a large amount of sunshine year round due to its stable descending air and high pressure. According to the Köppen Climate Classification system, Winterhaven has a desert climate, abbreviated "Bwh" on climate maps.

== Demographics ==
Historical population
Census	Pop.	Note	%±
2000	529		—
2010	394		−25.5%
2020	390		−1.0%
U.S. Decennial Census; 1860–1870 1880-1890; 1900 1910 1920; 1930 1940 1950; 1960 1970 1980; 1990 2000 2010

Winterhaven first appeared as a census-designated place in the 2000 U.S. census.

=== 2020 ===
The 2020 United States census reported that Winterhaven had a population of 390. The population density was 1,598.4 inhabitants per square mile (617.1/km^{2}). The racial makeup of Winterhaven was 94 (24.1%) White, 4 (1.0%) African American, 43 (11.0%) Native American, 4 (1.0%) Asian, 0 (0.0%) Pacific Islander, 93 (23.8%) from other races, and 152 (39.0%) from two or more races. Hispanic or Latino of any race were 294 persons (75.4%).

The whole population lived in households. There were 136 households, out of which 29 (21.3%) had children under the age of 18 living in them, 54 (39.7%) were married-couple households, 7 (5.1%) were cohabiting couple households, 37 (27.2%) had a female householder with no partner present, and 38 (27.9%) had a male householder with no partner present. 50 households (36.8%) were one person, and 29 (21.3%) were one person aged 65 or older. The average household size was 2.87. There were 80 families (58.8% of all households).

The age distribution was 103 people (26.4%) under the age of 18, 36 people (9.2%) aged 18 to 24, 69 people (17.7%) aged 25 to 44, 86 people (22.1%) aged 45 to 64, and 96 people (24.6%) who were 65 years of age or older. The median age was 41.0 years. For every 100 females, there were 80.6 males.

There were 164 housing units at an average density of 672.1 units per square mile (259.5 units/km^{2}), of which 136 (82.9%) were occupied. Of these, 82 (60.3%) were owner-occupied, and 54 (39.7%) were occupied by renters.

== Politics ==
In the state legislature, Winterhaven is in the 18th senatorial district, represented by Democrat Steve Padilla, and the 36th Assembly district, represented by Republican Jeff Gonzalez.

Federally, Winterhaven is in California's 25th congressional district, represented by Democrat Raul Ruiz.

== Government ==
The Winterhaven County Water District provides water service to Winterhaven.

== Sites of interest ==
- Museum of History in Granite

== Nearby ==
- Felicity, California
- Yuma, Arizona
- Los Algodones, Baja California
- Chocolate Mountains

== See also ==
- San Diego–Imperial, California
