= 1967 Lake Erie skydiving disaster =

Fatal skydiving accident near Huron, Ohio, United States

- 1967 Lake Erie skydiving disaster (Ohio) The actual and intended drop sites
- Date: August 27, 1967; 58 years ago
- Location: Lake Erie near Huron, Ohio, United States
- Type: Aviation accident, skydiving accident
- Cause: Air traffic control error and decision by pilot and divers (Note: Skydivers found "not without fault" for jumping in National Transportation Safety Board report, but found not liable in civil litigation.) to jump through cloud cover in violation of regulations
- Outcome: Congress considers greater regulation of skydiving
- Deaths: 16 by drowning
- Inquiries: Fatal Parachuting Accident Near Huron, Ohio, August 27, 1967: Special Investigation Report
- Litigation: Dreyer v. United States (1972), affirmed as Freeman v. United States (1975)

On August 27, 1967, eighteen skydivers mistakenly parachuted into Lake Erie, four or five nautical miles (7.5–9.3 km) from Huron, Ohio, United States, after jumping from a civilian North American B-25 Mitchell. Sixteen drowned. The plane's pilot, unable to see the surface through heavy cloud cover, relied on guidance from the Cleveland Air Route Traffic Control Center, which incorrectly advised him that he was over Ortner Airport—actually twelve to thirteen miles (19–21 km) away. Jumping through cloud cover in violation of Federal Aviation Administration rules, the skydivers were unaware that they were over water until they punched through the clouds at 4,000 feet (1,200 m). Despite efforts by many to shed heavy gear, only two were able to stay above water for long enough to be rescued.

The disaster was at the time the deadliest in the history of recreational skydiving (Note: Per AP 1967c and Time 1967. The death toll was surpassed by the 1982 Mannheim helicopter crash, which killed 46 people, including 38 skydivers. As of 1992, no skydiving incident had surpassed the Lake Erie disaster in terms of individuals killed after jumping.) and led to congressional scrutiny into regulation of skydiving. A report by the National Transportation Safety Board faulted the pilot, and to a lesser extent the parachutists, for executing a jump through clouds, and faulted the controller for misidentifying the plane's position after confusing it with a Cessna 180 Skywagon there to photograph the jump. The United States was subsequently held liable for the controller's error; the legal case, Freeman v. United States (1975), is notable for its holding that the skydivers did not have contributory negligence because the regulations they violated were not about their own safety.

== Lead-up ==
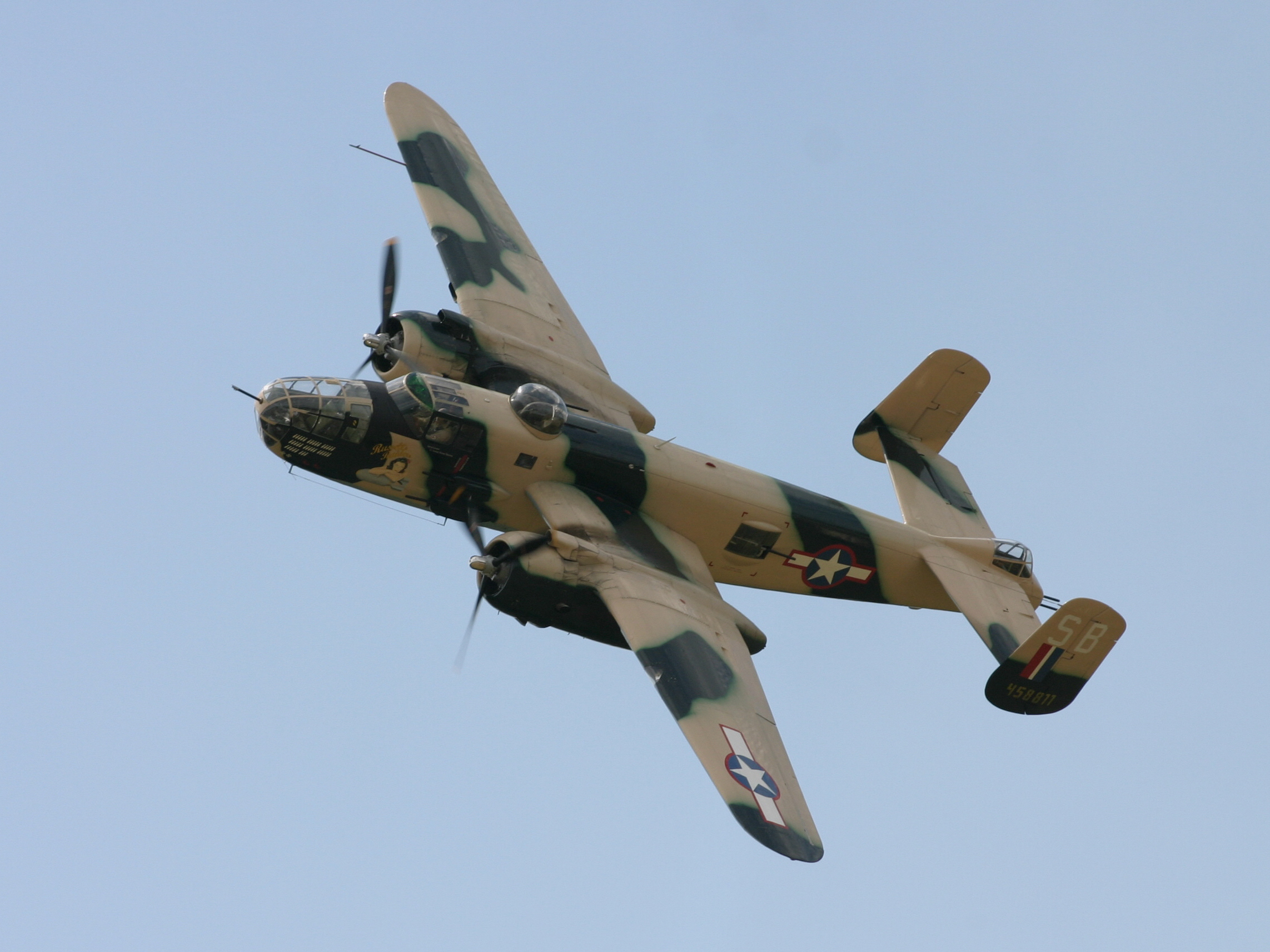
A North American B-25 Mitchell like N3443G

Around 30 parachutists arrived at Ortner Airport in Wakeman, Ohio, on August 27, 1967, to skydive together from a privately owned North American B-25 Mitchell bomber (registration N3443G). After a previous paid performance at an air show, the bomber's owner, Bob Karns, offered a free jump out of gratitude to the skydiving community. With weeks of anticipation, skydivers came from across Ohio. The event was not sponsored by a skydiving organization. The plane, which had not been modified for skydiving, became overloaded toward the rear when they initially attempted to load it with all comers, and so less experienced divers were asked to make way for the 20 most experienced. Seventeen of the jumpers were United States Parachute Association (USPA) members and had made at least 75 jumps before; of those, seven had made at least 200, including at least one intentional water jump. All signed liability waivers.

Karns piloted the B-25. Eighteen divers were to jump from 20,000 feet (6,100 m), with the other two to jump from 30,000 feet (9,100 m). The jump area was part of a busy corridor for Cleveland Hopkins International Airport. Allan Homestead, a major in the U.S. Air Force who was to be one of the two 30,000-foot jumpers, contacted Cleveland five hours prior to the jump and was told to expect substantial cloud cover but with gaps for jumping. The other 30,000-foot jumper, Larry Hartman, acted as an unofficial jumpmaster. All involved were men except for one woman, Patricia Lowensbury.

A spectator, Ted Murphy, decided to fly up to 12,000 feet and take photos of the descending skydivers, accompanied by a parachutist who had intended to jump but had changed his mind due to the overcrowding. Karns and his co-pilot took off shortly after 3 pm, and Murphy and his companion took off soon after in Murphy's Cessna 180 Skywagon (N2934C).

== Incident ==
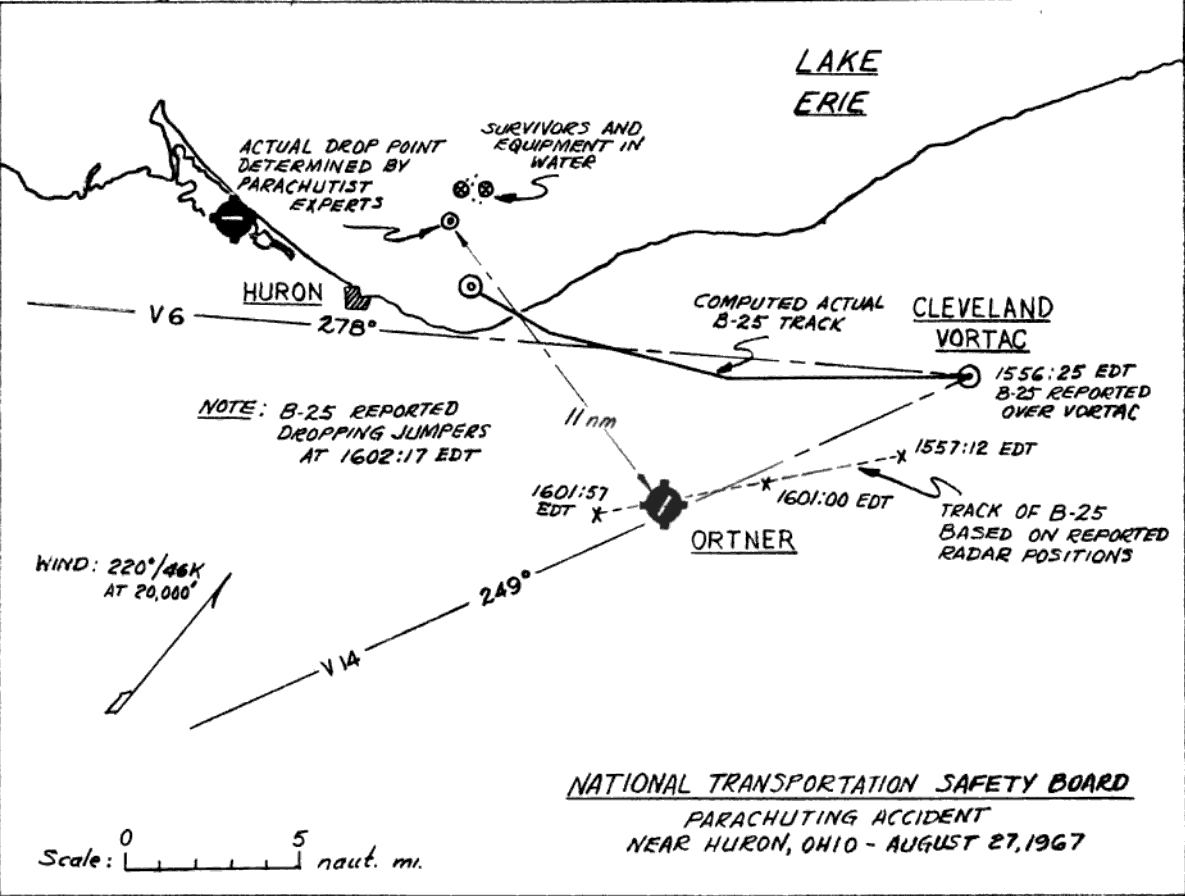
Map of the incident made by the NTSB, showing the B-25's actual path and the path Smits thought it was on

Karns flew up to 20,000 feet (6,100 m) in a circular pattern over the course of about an hour. Unable to see the ground, he communicated with the Cleveland Air Route Traffic Control Center to know his plane's position. Karns's equipment allowed him to communicate with Cleveland Center or navigate via VHF omnidirectional range (VOR, also known as Vortac or Omni), but not both at once; he did not tell the controller about this. At 20,000 feet, Karns requested a heading from the VOR station that would take him over Ortner. During Karns's ascent, there had been a change in shift at Cleveland Center. Engel Smit, the new controller on duty, mistook the Cessna's position on the radar display for the B-25's and gave Karns instructions as if he were Murphy. This led Karns to think he was back over Ortner when he was in fact over Lake Erie, four to five nautical miles (7–9 km) from Huron. Karns slowed the plane from 145 miles per hour to 105 (233 km/h to 169) and opened the bomb bay doors.

Shortly after 4 pm, following Karns's order as relayed through Hartman, the 18 skydivers jumped in quick succession from four exits. The surface was not visible through cloud cover; jumping under such conditions was forbidden by Federal Aviation Administration rules, as well as those of the USPA. The opening of the bomb bay doors flooded the plane with sunlight and noise, and from the plane's interior it was difficult for jumpers to see their surroundings prior to jumping. Homestead, still aboard the plane, noticed breaks in the clouds but could not tell whether it was land or water below.

The cloud layer spanned roughly 4,000 to 6,000 feet (1,200–1,800 m), and so for the first 14,000 feet of descent, the jumpers remained unaware that they were over water. They had planned to practice maneuvers as they fell, but because they had jumped from different parts of the plane at high speed, were fairly scattered. Johnson and Lowensbury were able to touch hands twice before hitting the clouds.

According to a survivor, the jumpers deployed their parachutes at around 3,000 ft (900 m). At least one jumper, Michael Thiem, could not swim. In summaries of the incident by the National Transportation Safety Board (NTSB) and a federal court, the only account of the deceased jumpers' reactions comes from the two survivors, Robert L. Coy and Bernard Johnson, who reported seeing several canopies already deployed, running roughly parallel to the shore. Coy said he was "flabbergasted" to realize he was over the lake. He opened his parachute earlier than normal, hoping to drift closer to the shore. Both survivors shed boots, heavy clothing, and anything that would not float, doffing their chutes and jump suits as they hit the water. Coy used first his reserve parachute and later his helmet as flotation devices. Other gear was later found floating in the water, which a judge surmised indicated similar efforts by the other jumpers to shed weight. One jumper did have a flotation device, but it failed to deploy.

Glimpsing water through a hole in the clouds, Karns remarked to his co-pilot that he hoped they had not dropped the jumpers over Lake Erie. The two remaining skydivers later jumped as planned and safely landed at Ortner. Karns, who had to remove his oxygen mask to use the radio, may have exhibited some symptoms of hypoxia, but only subsequent to the first drop.

== Aftermath ==
=== Rescue and recovery ===
20,000-foot jumpers
- Donald Akers
- Norman Allard
- Stanley Becka
- Lyle Boyler
- Robert Coy (Note: Survived)
- James Dreyer
- Jerry Freeman
- Ralph Hazelton
- Bernard Johnson
- Dorsie Kitchen
- Patricia Lowensbury
- Joseph Malarik
- William Onsyko Jr.
- Richard Patfield
- Fred Rivenburg
- David Sheehan
- James Simmons
- Mike Thiem

One Oberlin College professor reported seeing about a dozen parachutes hit the water in a line. Paul Potter, an off-duty Coast Guard lieutenant at the beach near Lorain, saw the chutes deploy and ran for a telephone before the first diver hit the water. Potter notified Coast Guard Station Lorain and then worked with civilian boaters to coordinate a rescue. Efforts began within minutes. About 30 boats searched for the jumpers along the axis from Huron to Vermilion, but efforts were hampered by the cold and strong winds. Dean Phillips and Richard Ralph, two brothers-in-law out on a pleasure boat, rescued Coy and Johnson, as well as Dorsie Kitchen, whom they were unable to resuscitate. Coast Guard assessments for finding more survivors were pessimistic, which was borne out in following days; the final body was recovered on September 4.

=== Investigation and proposed legislation ===
Some government officials initially suggested that the jumpers had been blown 20 miles (32 km) from their target by a strong crosswind. In the immediate aftermath, one survivor reported that "[t]he plane was in the wrong place", and the pilots of both the B-25 and the Cessna said that they had been given the wrong information by air traffic control. On September 2, the National Transportation Safety Board began an investigation. Norman Heaton, executive director of the United States Parachute Association, testified that the jumpers could not have drifted more than 16,000 ft (5,000 m), meaning that the bomber was at least a mile (1.6 km) offshore at the time of the jump. Smit maintained that the bomber was six miles (9.7 km) inland. Karns, Coy, Johnson, Homestead, and Hartman testified as well.

The NTSB conducted three studies: The first concluded that the jumpers could not have drifted more than two miles (3.2 km), putting the bomber three to four miles (4.8–6.4 km) offshore and eleven miles (18 km) from Ortner. The second reconstructed the flight path and reached a similar conclusion as to the plane's location. The third considered the locations of both planes relative to the locations they were given by air traffic control, concluding that Smit mistook the Cessna for the B-25. The report faulted Karns for executing a jump when he could not see the ground and the air traffic controller for giving the wrong position for the plane; it also said that the skydivers themselves, given their experience, "were not without fault" for jumping under dangerous conditions. The board further found that, while Karns was certified as a pilot, he was not rated to fly a B-25 and the plane was not certified to carry passengers. They also noted Karns's failure to disclose his equipment's inability to navigate and communicate at the same time.

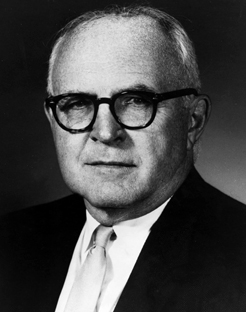
NTSB Chair Joseph J. O'Connell Jr.

Shortly after the disaster, Senator Mike Monroney of Oklahoma, chair of the Commerce Subcommittee on Aviation, proposed legislation for regulation of skydiving by the Federal Aviation Administration (FAA). The NTSB's chair, Joseph J. O'Connell, presented the board's findings on September 25 at a hearing of the subcommittee regarding the proposed legislation. David D. Thomas, deputy administrator of the FAA, testified that jumping through clouds was already outright prohibited. Both officials spoke in opposition to increased regulation, saying that the current system was adequate. The bill, S. 2137 of the 90th Congress, did not become law.

=== Lawsuit ===
Both survivors and the estates of all 16 deceased jumpers sued the United States for the air traffic controller's error. In the consolidated Federal Tort Claims Act case, Dreyer v. United States (1972), the U.S. District Court for the Northern District of Ohio found the United States liable on the basis of Smit's negligence. The decision was affirmed by the Sixth Circuit Court of Appeals under the name Freeman v. United States (1975).

Dreyer came as the federal courts explored the contexts in which the FAA has a duty of care. James J. McCarthy, in the Journal of Air Law and Commerce, characterizes it as "an interesting and somewhat unusual case". In the same journal, Laura J. Perkins cites Freeman as an example of how it is often easier to collect damages against a third party than against an air sport service provider, as the former are not covered by waivers. Freeman is cited in the Restatement of Torts, Third, Liability for Physical and Emotional Harm for its finding that, since the skydiving regulations at the time were not designed to protect skydivers but rather those they might hit, there was no contributory negligence on the part of the jumpers.

=== Other developments ===
Coy swore off skydiving immediately after the incident. Skydivers conducted memorial jumps in 1968 and 1969, both times first throwing a wreath out of a plane and then intentionally jumping into Lake Erie. A Springfield News-Sun article about the 1969 jump notes that the skydivers wore light clothing and flotation devices. In 2020, one man who had gotten off the bomber before it took off told The Advertiser-Tribune of Tiffin, Ohio, that he was considering celebrating his 90th birthday, four years thence, by doing the same.

N3443G, the B-25 that dropped the skydivers, was subsequently sold. It was destroyed in 1970 in a crash at Orange Municipal Airport in Massachusetts, killing its pilot, Roger Lopez.
