= Medford Knife and Tool =

American knife-making company

- Industry: Manufacturing
- Founded: Phoenix, Arizona (2010; 16 years ago)
- Headquarters: Phoenix, Arizona
- Key people: Greg Medford
- Products: Knives
- Number of employees: 25
- Website: medfordknife.com

Medford Knife and Tool is an American custom and production knifemaking and tactical tool making facility founded by Greg Medford in 2010 in Arizona United States.

== The company ==
The company was founded in Arizona, United States, by Greg Medford. Unlike most knife makers who start out as a home-based business, Medford opened a modern factory, complete with CAD and CNC milling machines. The knives are made in the US and most of the work is done by hand as opposed to automated machining. The company mainly produces folding knives, but at the same time it produces fixed blades knives and tactical tools such as Tomahawks, machetes and Steel knuckles. A knife model called the "Praetorian" is considered the company's most recognized knife.

== Products ==
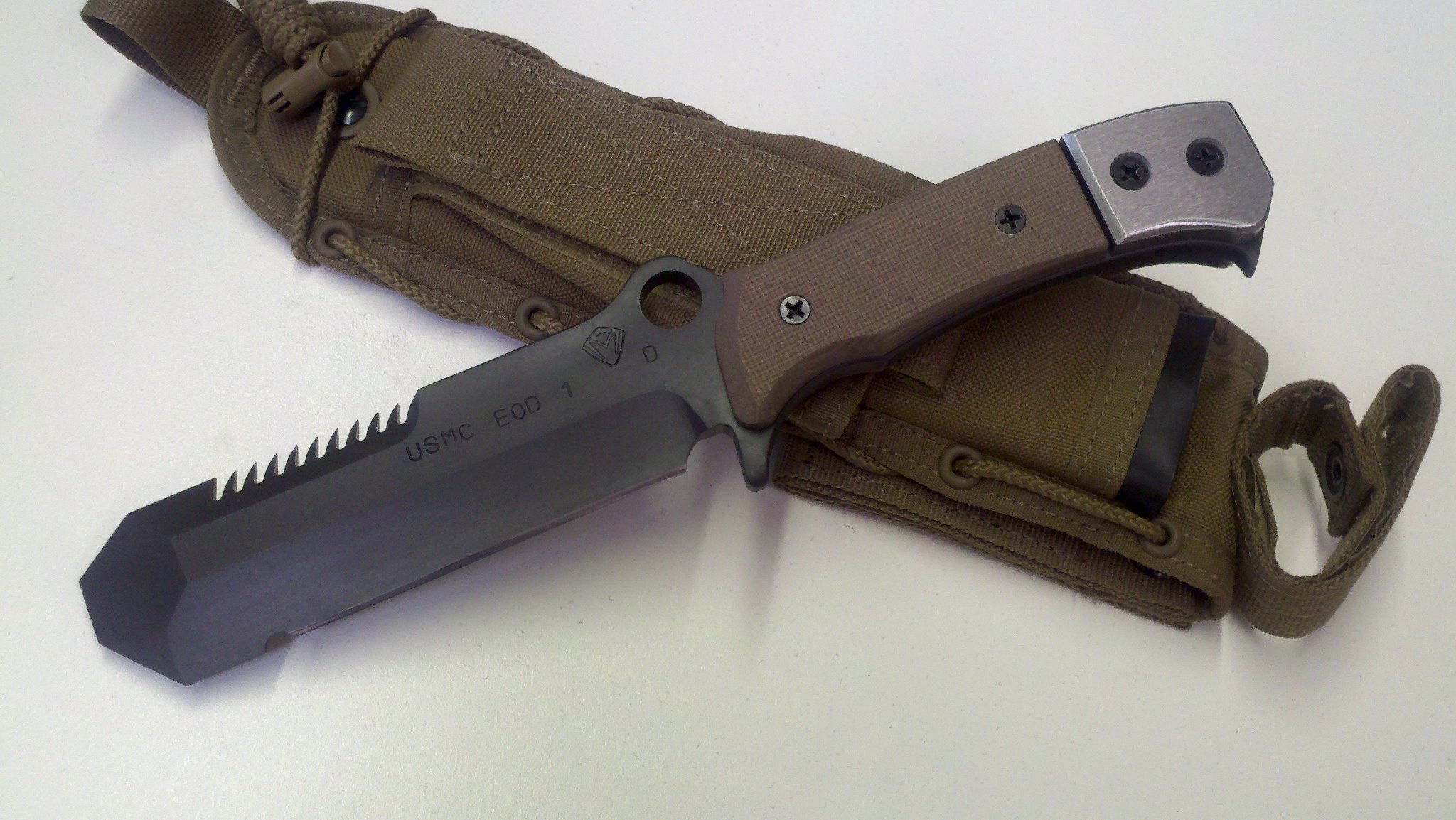
Medford USMC EOD-1 knife

The company's knives and tools feature minimal design elements and clean lines, a massive structure, and a combination of grinds and some describe them as overbuilt. Some knives models are combined with tool elements, such as screwdriver heads or glass breaker. Knife blades are usually made from D-2 Steel, CPM-S35VN Stainless steel and CPM3V Steel, for handles the company uses titanium, G-10, carbon fiber, or a Paracord.

== Cooperation with military units ==
The USMC EOD-1 model was designed in collaboration with the US Marines according to their requirements. The TM-1 machete was designed according to the requirements of international security services companies.

== Controversies ==
Media Matters for America has accused Greg Medford of making numerous racist and sexist remarks, including on his podcast and YouTube channel. MMfA and AZ Mirror have also criticized Medford for producing Islamophobic and anti-Chinese T-shirts.
