= George Galloway (disambiguation) =

George Galloway (born 1954) is a British politician, broadcaster and writer.

George Galloway may also refer to:

- George Galloway (cricketer) (1803–1867), English cricketer
- George Galloway (parachute maker) (born 1949), American parachute manufacturer
- George N. Galloway (1841/42–1904), American soldier and Medal of Honor recipient
