= Lew Sanborn =

American skydiver

Lewis B. Sanborn (born: July 10, 1930 Cleveland, Ohio) is an early developer of the freefall method of skydiving who along with Jacques-André Istel helped popularize sport parachuting in the United States. He is considered by many to be a pioneer and legend in the sport. In 1959, Sanborn and Istel co-founded Parachutes Incorporated, the first commercial parachuting center in the United States. An accomplished pilot, member of the United States Army’s 82nd Airborne Division from 1948 to 1952, national skydiving champion in 1954 and 1959 and Hall of Fame skydiver (introductory class 2010) He continues to jump on a regular basis and is still active in the skydiving community.

Lewis “Lew” Sanborn, D-1 and Jacques André Istel, D-2, established sport skydiving in Orange, Massachusetts in the 1950s. Sanborn started jumping with the Army’s 82nd Airborne Division and later became a member of the U.S. Parachute Team, master rigger, private and commercial pilot, instructor, national judge and world-record holder. He devised a technique for freefall photography and shot a cover photo for Sports Illustrated. In 1960, he was even nominated for an Academy Award for filming the skydiving documentary “A Sport is Born.” In 1972, USPA honored him with its Lifetime Achievement Award “for originating safe and reliable parachuting equipment and pioneering work in freefall photography.” In 2000, Istel inducted him into the Hall of Fame of Parachuting in Felicity, California. In 2001, the Golden Knights made him an honorary member, and in 2010, the International Skydiving Museum inducted him into its Hall of Fame.
