= Jacques-André Istel =

French parachutist

- Born: 1929 (age 96–97); Paris, France

Jacques-André Istel (born 1929 in Paris, France) is a French-American recreational parachutist and investment banker and later in life, historian, widely responsible for popularizing parachuting in the United States. He is considered "the father of American skydiving." He founded an unincorporated place in southeastern California, which he named Felicity and it is here that he founded the Museum of History in Granite.

== Early life ==
Jacques-André Istel was born in France to Yvonne Istel, who had been a prominent volunteer in World War I and who would later also volunteer during World War II, and André Istel, an investment banker and diplomat, representing the de Gaulle government at the 1944 Bretton Woods conference. He, his mother and siblings left France in 1940 to avoid the German invasion. He attended The Stony Brook School, entering with barely any English, and graduated salutatorian of his class in 1945. He studied economics at Princeton University, graduating in 1949, and served in the U.S. Marines during the Korean War. Istel earned the rank of Lt. Colonel.

== Parachuting ==
Istel first tried parachuting in 1950, and quickly became an expert. He soon started popularizing parachuting in America by touring college campuses and leading the American team he organized to the World Championship of Parachuting in 1956. Istel, at that time a Captain in the reserves, wrote to HQMC recommending the use of free fall parachuting for reconnaissance. The letter ultimately led to the "HALO" (high altitude low opening) project.

In 1958, he captained the U.S. team that won the French Coupe du Monde, together with Lew Sanborn, Dana Smith, and Charlie Hillard. He led the team that set the first day and night world records for the US in 1961.

He insisted on safety while parachuting, writing the original basic safety regulations for the sport, which were accepted by the Civil Aeronautics Administration. He pioneered the Telsan technique with Sanborn. He also founded Parachutes, Inc. with Sanborn, as first employee a company that designed parachutes and opened the first parachuting schools in America.

In 1957 he and his company trained the United States Army in Free Fall parachuting, previously forbidden as too reckless by the Army. His students became the first members of the U.S.Army famed Golden Knights parachute team.

He is thought to be the first sport parachutist in America to wear a helmet-mounted camera in an attempt to record images during freefall. Having opened the first professional Sport Parachuting Center in Orange, Massachusetts, he believed that exciting footage would be an important way to introduce the sport.

He was awarded the Leo Stevens Award for parachuting in 1958, and, decades later, the award is given by a museum in the town he founded. He made his last jump in 1972 and sold Parachutes, Inc. in the mid-1980s. A profile of Istel as "this country's leading parachutist" was published in The New Yorker magazine January 24, 1959.

In 1957 he founded the National Collegiate Parachuting League.

He chaired the Sport Parachuting Commission of the Commonwealth of Massachusetts and was President of the 26 country Sixth World Parachuting Championships, held at Orange in 1962.

In 1965 he was elected Lifetime Honorary President of the International Parachuting Commission of the Federation Aeronautique Internationale.

He is Chairman of the Board of Trustees of the Hall of Fame of Parachuting.

He was a Director of the National Aeronautic Association from 1965 to 1968 and of the Marine Corps Scholarship foundation from 1975 to 1985.

In 1964 he was co-leader of the National Geographic society Vilcabamba expedition in Peru.

== Felicity, California ==
In 1985, Istel wrote a children's book entitled Coe, the Good Dragon at the Center of the World, and a year later founded the town of Felicity, California, named after his wife, Felicia. The town has a plaque inside a pyramid in which the story claims the official center of the world is located. The town also has various other structures, including numerous granite monuments on which important names and events are engraved, as well as about 30 people. In 1985, Imperial County, California recognized the site as the official center of the world, as did the French government in 1989. He is the founder and has been the mayor of Felicity for more than 30 years. As one of 135 candidates, he gained two write-in votes in the 2003 California gubernatorial recall election as a Republican.

== Museum of History in Granite ==
The Museum of History in Granite, now a candidate as a World Heritage Site, was founded by Istel as a division of the Hall of Fame of Parachuting (founded 1973). This two decade effort is the crowning achievement of his life. Eighteen granite monuments include eight monuments to the History of Humanity, the History of Arizona (2010), the Marine Corps Korean War Memorial (1998), the History of French Aviation (2002), the History of the French Foreign Legion (2003) and to be dedicated on February 22, 2014, the History of the United States of America. These 100 foot granite monuments are designed to last 4000 years.

In 2014 Time, Inc named the design (by Istel and lifelong friend Wolfgang Lieschke) one of 24 in America worth the voyage.

In 2014 Northern Arizona University started using museum monument panels as teaching tools for student teachers.

He has lectured at Princeton, Yale, Harvard, MIT, and West Point.

Three books of history by Jacques-Andre Istel are published: "The History of Arizona"," The History of Humanity Volume I - Engraved in Granite", and the" History of the United States of America-Engraved in Granite".

== Recognition ==
In 2003 Istel was awarded the Legion of Honor, France's highest decoration. He also received the European Air and Space medal, and in 2007 a citation from the Senate of Massachusetts.

In 1969 he was awarded the Diplome Paul Tissandier by the Fédération Aéronautique Internationale.

Named Honorary Citizen of Yuma, Arizona in 2007, he received the Alumni Achievement Award of The Stony Brook School in 2010. He was named Honorary Air Boss at Marine Corps Air Station Yuma in March 2019.

He is an honorary member of the U.S. Army Golden Knights and U.S. Navy Chuting Stars.

His 1957 parachute, using his revolutionary idea of very low porosity cloth, is the first Sport Parachute and is now in the Smithsonian Institution.

Istel was named an honorary citizen of Margency, France.

Among numerous unusual recognitions, Istel is an Honorary Master of Sports of the Soviet Union 1956, First Class Honorary Legionnaire of the French Foreign Legion, 2013, and Outstanding Marine, signed by two Commandants of the United States Marine Corps, Generals Robert H. Barrow and Paul X. Kelley. A third Commandant, General Charles C. Krulak, wrote: "we are a better Corps today because of you." He has received many commendations about Felicity and the Museum of History in Granite. John C. Bogle, founder of The Vanguard Group, wrote: "You have created an extraordinary monument to all humankind and done so with class and thoroughness."
