= George Galloway (parachute maker) =

American businessman (born 1949)

- Born: George William Galloway; Chattanooga, Tennessee, U.S.
- Occupation(s): President and CEO, Precision Aerodynamics, Inc.
- Board member of: Parachute Industry Association
- Children: 4

George Galloway (born 17 November 1949) is an American businessman who is the founder, president and CEO of Precision Aerodynamics, Inc. He is known for creating and distributing the "Raven" series of ram-air parachutes, the first type that could be scaled to different sizes, allowing people of different body types and weights to experience the same performance from the same type of parachute. Raven reserve parachutes are the most widely used reserve canopies in the world, used by the U.S. military for special operations. Galloway entered the parachute business since 1975 selling to clients ranging from both U.S. and foreign armed forces to high-rise building workers in dangerous areas and in 21 different countries.
