= Parachute cord =

Multi-core rope originally used for parachutes

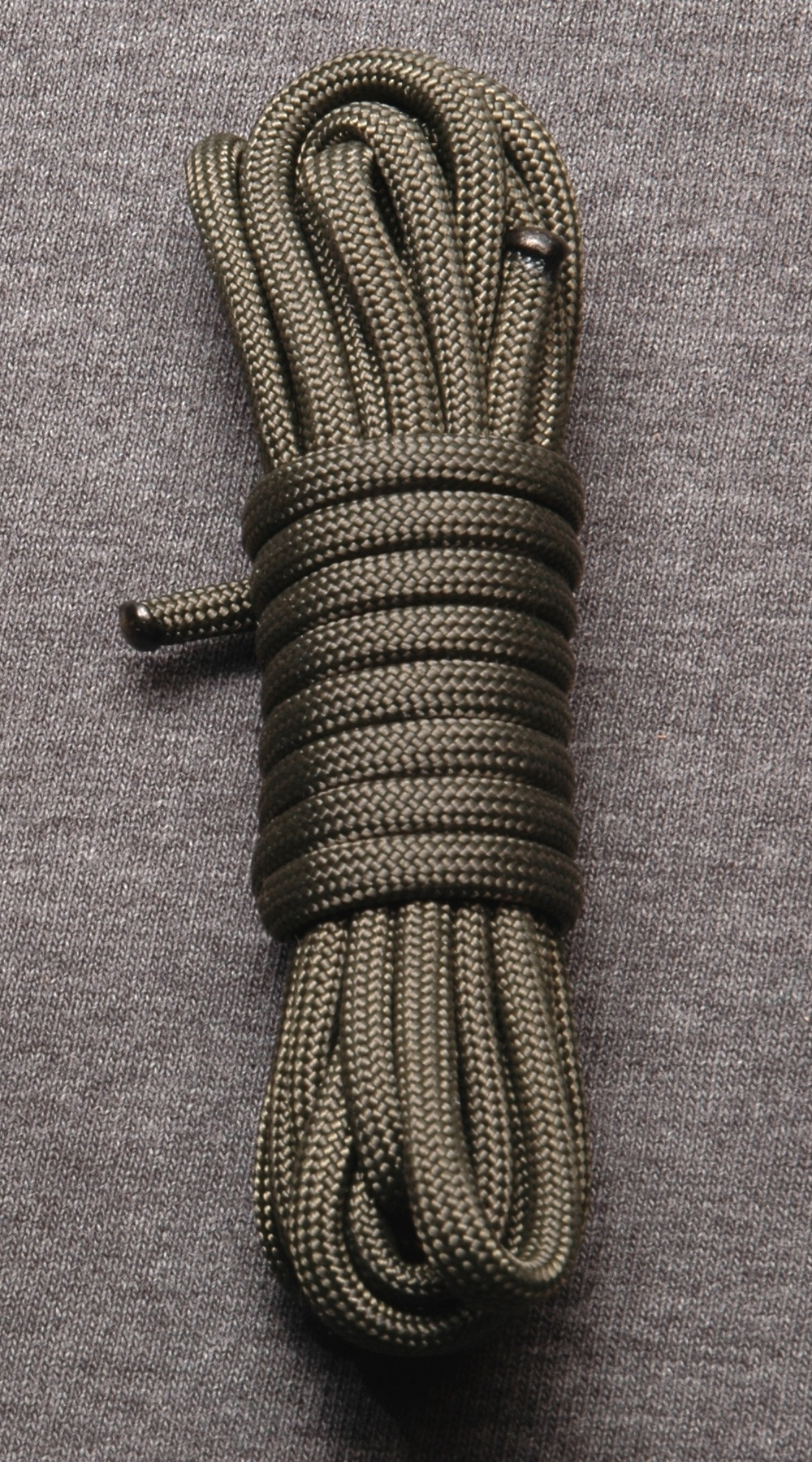
A 10 ft (3.0 m) coil of commercial parachute cord

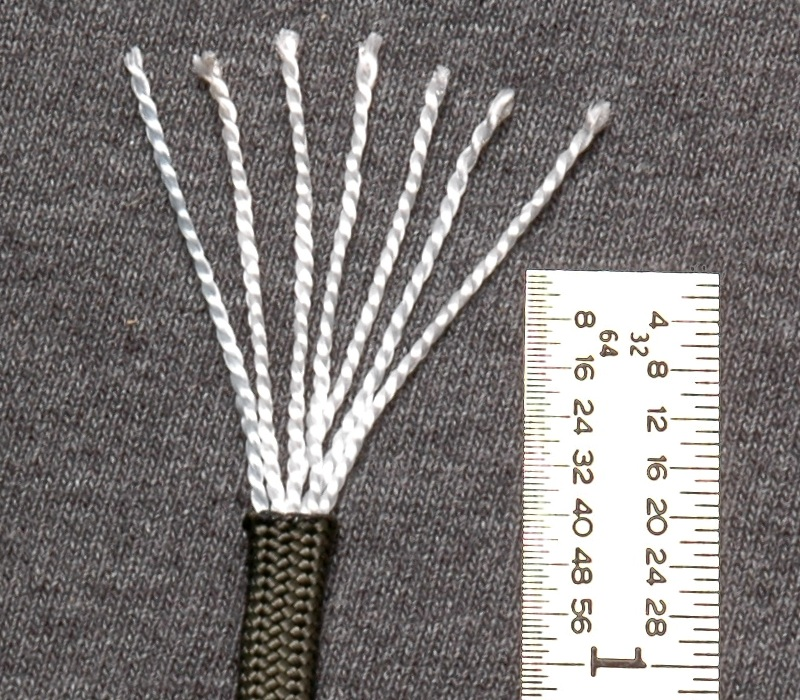
The sheath of this commercial parachute cord is braided from 32 strands and the core made up of seven two-ply yarns.

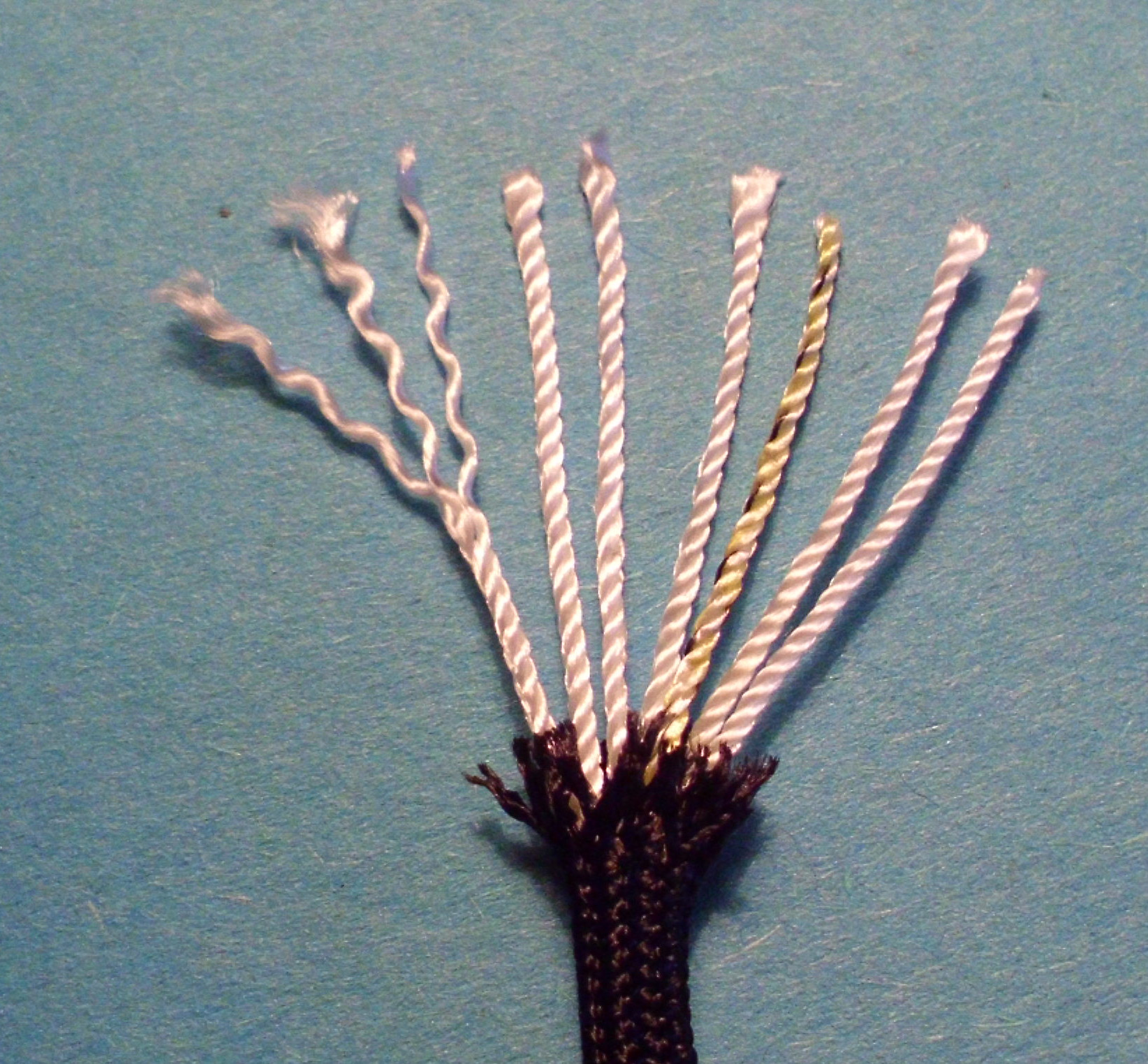
Genuine MIL-SPEC MIL-C-5040 Type III Paracord has 7 inner cords each made up of 3 strands.

Parachute cord or paracord (also known as 550 cord when referring to type-III paracord) is a lightweight nylon kernmantle rope originally used in the suspension lines of parachutes, but now used as a general purpose utility cord.

The braided sheath is usually made up of 32 interwoven strands, giving it a relatively smooth texture. The all-nylon construction makes paracord somewhat elastic.

Current technical standards for the manufacture of cord for use in parachutes are published by the Parachute Industry Association. The now inactivated US military standard MIL-C-5040H required the material to be nylon. Similar styles of cord are manufactured with other materials such as polyester.

== Usage ==
Historically associated with airborne units and divisions, paracord is not used as cordage for modern "square" parachutes. However, it continues to be used by many military units in almost any situation where light cordage is needed. Typical uses include attaching equipment to harnesses, as dummy cords to avoid losing small or important items, tying rucksacks to vehicle racks, securing camouflage nets to trees or vehicles, and so forth. When threaded with beads, paracord may be used as a pace counter to estimate ground covered by foot.

The yarns of the core (commonly referred to as "the guts") can also be removed when finer string is needed, for instance as sewing thread to repair gear, or to be used as fishing line in a survival situation. For applications requiring a thinner or less elastic cord, such as shoelaces, users often remove the yarn in the core and use the nylon sheath alone. The ends of the cord can be melted and/or crimped to prevent fraying.

Patented SurvivorCord (MIL-SPEC 550 Paracord, with integrated fishing line, fire-starter, and snare wire.)

There are also modern versions of parachute cord that include non-traditional survival strands within the core such as fishing line, fire tinder, and even snare wire.

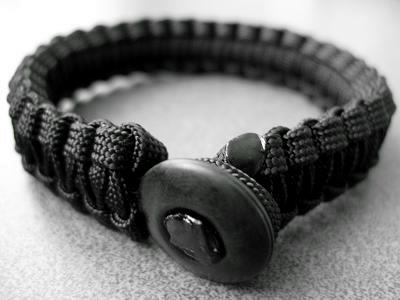
A typical 550 cord bracelet.

In addition to purely utility functions, paracord can be used to fashion knotted or braided bracelets, lanyards, belts, and other decorative items. These are sometimes tied in a fashion that can easily be unraveled for use in a survival situation. Some companies use paracord in conjunction with other survival components to create everyday wearable survival kits.

The same properties which soldiers appreciate in paracord are also useful in civilian applications. After World War II parachute cord became available to civilians, first as military surplus and then as a common retail product from various surplus stores and websites. A given product labelled as paracord may not correspond to a specific military type and can be of differing construction, quality, color, or strength. Particularly poor quality examples may have fewer strands in the sheath or core, have cores constructed of bulk fiber rather than individual yarns, or include materials other than nylon.

Paracord has also been used for whipmaking. The durability and versatility of this material has proved beneficial for performing whip crackers and enthusiasts. Since nylon does not rot or mildew, it has become known as an all-weather material for whipmaking.

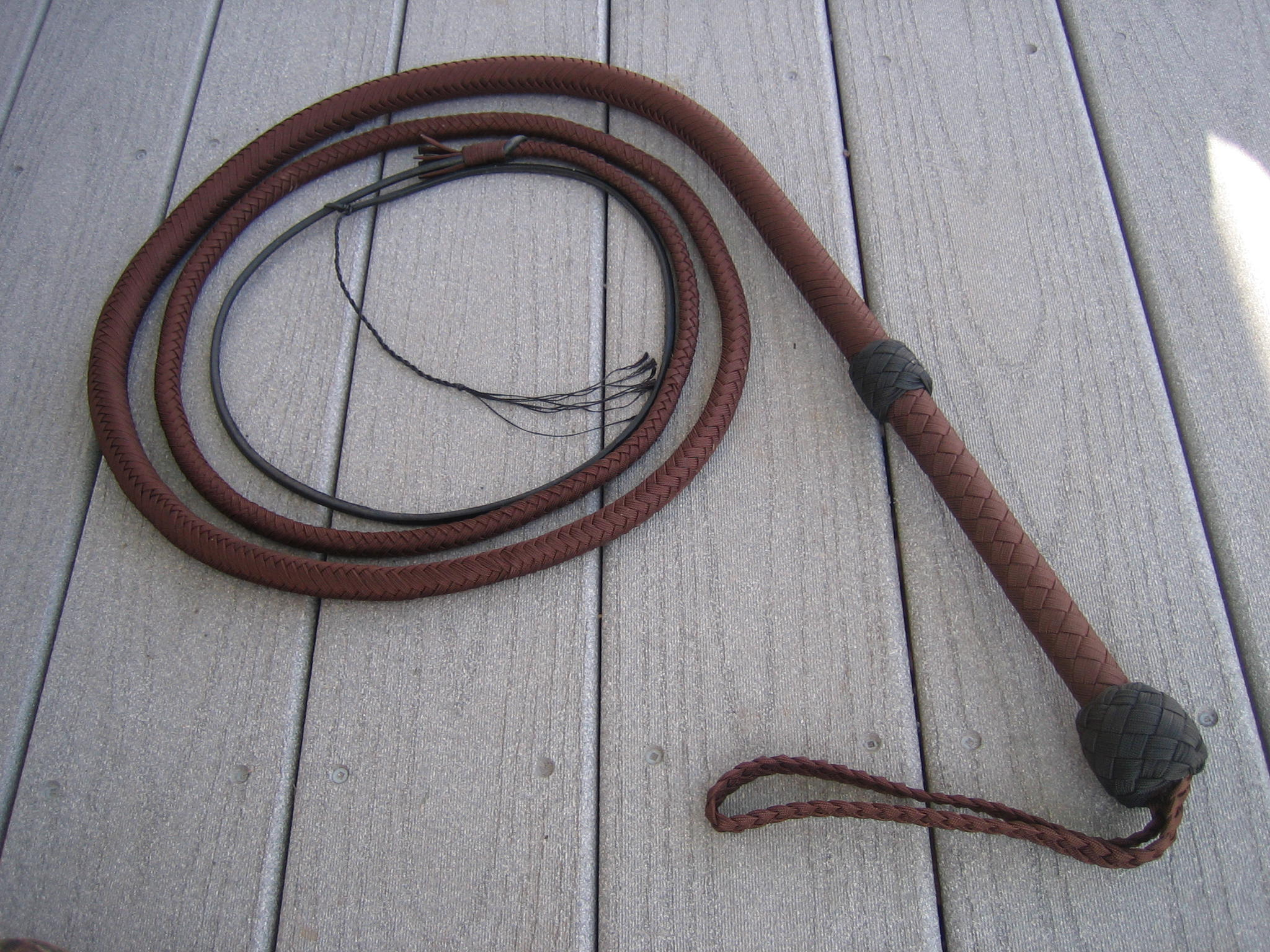
A brown nylon bullwhip

Hikers and outdoor sports enthusiasts sometimes use "survival bracelets" made of several feet of paracord which is woven into a compact and wearable form. Such bracelets are meant to be unraveled when one needs rope for whatever purpose — securing cargo, lashing together poles, fixing broken straps or belts, or assisting with water rescues. Young survivalists, such as Girl Scouts and Boy Scouts, are also taught the importance of using the paracord as a survival tool. On the other hand, the paracord is a poor choice for an emergency tourniquet as its small diameter will crush tissue without applying the needed pressure to stop bleeding.

Another use of parachute cord is in the stringing of mallet percussion instruments, such the xylophone, marimba, or vibraphone.

A very similar usage niche is nylon webbing, a strong, economical fabric woven as a flat strip or tube, also often used in place of rope.

Additional uses for parachute cord are in the manufacture of items such as lanyards, belts, dog leashes, rosaries, and key chains. This is becoming more popular as crafters are discovering this material.

Paracord was used by astronauts during the 82nd Space Shuttle mission to repair the Hubble Space Telescope.

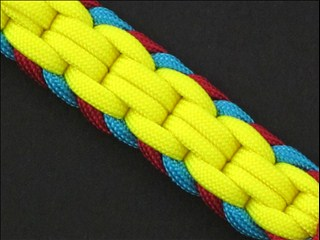
A decorative paracord knotting technique

== Types ==
US military issue paracord was purchased with reference to a technical standard MIL-C-5040H, which was inactivated in 1997. This standard described six types: I, IA, II, IIA, III, IV.

The core (also known as the kern) consists of several yarns, the number is determined by the cord type, and each yarn is made up of two or three (commercial) or three (MIL-Spec) smaller nylon fibers twisted together. Types IA and IIA differ from their type I and II counterparts in that they have no core. Type III, a type commonly found in use, is nominally rated with a minimum breaking strength of 550 pounds-force (2,400 N), thus the nickname "550 cord". All six types are specified to have a minimum elongation of 30%.

The US military specification for paracord gives strength and construction parameters to which the final product must conform, as well as requirements for packaging and marking. Although the standard contains specific denier figures for the sheath strands and inner yarns, there are no overall diameter requirements for the cord itself. Below is a table of selected elements from the specification.

Type	Minimum strength	Minimum elongation	Minimum length per pound of cord	Core yarns	Sheath structure
I	95 pounds (43 kg)	30%	950 feet per pound (640 m/kg)	1	16/1
IA	100 pounds (45 kg)	30%	1,050 feet per pound (710 m/kg)	<no core>	16/1
II	400 pounds (180 kg)	30%	265 feet per pound (178 m/kg)	4 to 7	32/1 or 36/1
IIA	225 pounds (102 kg)	30%	495 feet per pound (333 m/kg)	<no core>	32/1 or 36/1
III	550 pounds (250 kg)	30%	225 feet per pound (151 m/kg)	7 to 9	32/1 or 36/1
IV	750 pounds (340 kg)	30%	165 feet per pound (111 m/kg)	11	32/1, 36/1, or 44/1

== Thickness ==
Military-specification type III cord may be slightly thicker than commercial grade due to it often requiring three nylon fibers per inner core as opposed to the two fibers per core of the commercial version. Military cord will be closer to a 4 millimetres (5/32 in) thickness, whereas commercial versions are closer to a 3 millimetres (1/8 in) thickness. This will also vary if the Type III uses 7, 8, or 9 inner cores. The most common on the commercial market is seven cores. While the US military has no overall diameter requirements in its specifications, in the field, Type III cord typically measures 5/32 inch (4 mm) in diameter.

== Colors ==
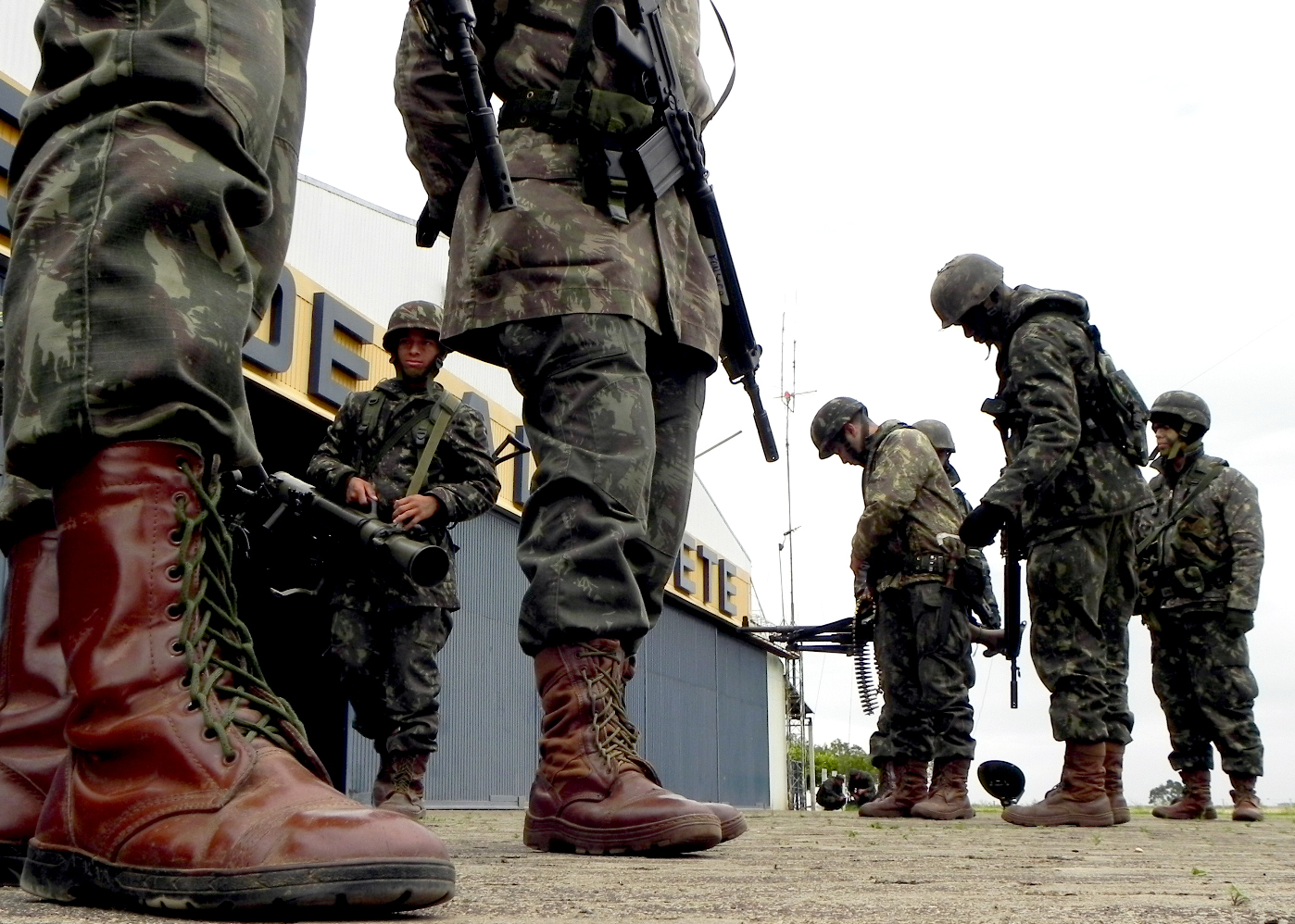
Brazilian soldiers with cobwebbed green paracord on jump boots

The inactivated military standard only describes sheath colors as natural or olive drab ("camouflage green"). However, commercially many dozens of different and variable colors are available ranging from simple colors such as blue, green, brown, and black to more intricate colors such as multi colored, camouflage, and neon variations. Paracord has also been made in special zombie patterns, light reflective, color-shifting, and glow in the dark.

== Manufacture ==
The inactivated specification describes the requirements for the manufacture of compliant cords. The fibers for the outer sheath must be colored using an approved dye; the dye cannot compromise the structure of the fibers or the finished product. The undyed fibers are twisted tightly to make the inner yarns: 3 bundles of fiber per core yarn. The sheath is then plaited over the yarns. The number of yarns are determined by cord type; type III would have 7-9 yarns. The cord is steamed to tighten the cord. This step is crucial for parachute use since the extra bit of stretch helps absorb the shock when the parachute is deployed.

=== Manufacturer markings ===
The inactivated military standard referred to a color code used to identify the manufacturers of the cord. Manufacturers would insert several dyed strands, using a code assigned in MIL STD 905 (also inactivated) to identify themselves. This was so that in the event of cord failure it would be possible to find the source of the sub-par cordage. Type 1A cord and Type 2A cord would have the marking fibers on the sheath since they contain no inner yarns. Types 1, III and IV would have yarns containing the marking color.
