= Skydiving regulation in the United States =

In the United States, skydiving is a self-regulated sport, which means skydivers, in the US, voluntarily follow a set of basic safety requirements established by the U.S. Parachute Association. Federal requirements can be found in the Federal Aviation Regulations. Most of the regulations concern the aircraft, pilot and rules of flight. However, 14 CFR Part 105, "Parachute Operations" regulates when and where jumps may be made and designates the requirements for parachute equipment and packing. For example, 14 CFR Part 105 (subpart C) requires the person packing either the main chute or the reserve parachute to be a certificated rigger, which means he or she has taken an FAA-approved training course and has passed rigorous FAA testing.

14 CFR Part 105 is based on the assumption that any individual who chooses to skydive has assessed the dangers involved and assumes personal responsibility for his or her safety. The regulations in Part 105 are intended to assure the safety of those not involved in the sport, including persons and property on the surface and other users of the airspace. The skydiving community is encouraged to adopt good operating practices and programs to avoid further regulation by the FAA.

== Skydiving and accidents ==
When a skydiver is involved in an accident, the first step by the FAA is to determine if any regulations were violated. An investigator will examine the circumstances and route of the flight; the certification of the pilot; the airworthiness of the aircraft; and will ensure that the parachutes were packed in accordance with the regulations.

If the FAA does not find any evidence of regulatory violation, it will defer any further investigation of the accident to local law enforcement. The accident then becomes a law enforcement investigation, and the FAA has no further involvement.

If the FAA determines one or more of the regulations were violated, it will launch a separate investigation into the areas under its regulatory control, which concern the aircraft, its pilot, mechanic, the location or timing of the jump, and the parachute rigging.

== Jump practices ==
The drop zone is a designated landing area clear of obstacles, and is usually marked. Some drop zones are located beneath complex airspace, and jump organizers will have a Letter of Agreement with the appropriate FAA air traffic control facility to address site-specific issues and concerns.

Each day, before jumping begins, the drop zone operator will determine the weather and consult the Winds Aloft Forecast. The jump pilot files a "Notification" of jumping, at least one hour before the first jump, with Air Traffic Control (ATC) as required by FAR 105, and may file a Notice to Airmen (NOTAM). Skydiving operations with continuous activity may file a permanent Notification and NOTAM, which are often depicted on aeronautical charts.

(NOTAMS help alert other pilots about the jump.) Since skydivers often freefall at a speed of 120 mph or more, their bodies can be extremely difficult to spot from other aircraft. It is the responsibility of all involved to watch and avoid each other.

During jump operations, pilots follow procedures covered by the general operating and flight rules covered by 14 CFR Part 91 of the Federal Aviation Regulations, as well as Part 105, which is discussed on page 1. The pilot will contact FAA Air Traffic Control a few minutes before the jump, advising of the jump altitude and exit time. Air traffic will advise of any other aircraft or unsafe conditions in the area.

From a typical jump altitude of 10,000 to 15,000 feet, it takes just over one minute for the skydiver to freefall to parachute opening altitudes of 4,000 to 2,000 feet above ground level (AGL).

The jump pilot ensures all jumpers have exited, advises Air Traffic Control and then descends to the airport. Skydiving ends when the pilot advises air traffic control that all of the jumpers have landed.

== See also ==
- 1967 Lake Erie skydiving disaster
