= United States Parachute Association =

Private sports governing body

- Sport: Skydiving
- Jurisdiction: United States
- Abbreviation: USPA
- Founded: 1946
- Affiliation: International Skydiving Commission
- Affiliation date: 1946
- Headquarters: 5401 Southpoint Centre Boulevard
- Location: Fredericksburg, Virginia, U.S.
- President: Chuck Akers
- Chairman: Randy Allison
- Vice president: Sherry Butcher
- Secretary: Ray Lallo, Jr.

Official website
- uspa.org

Skydive at Chambersburg

The United States Parachute Association (USPA) is a private sports governing body for the sport of skydiving in the United States. Its headquarters are located in Fredericksburg, Virginia. The USPA's roots go back to the National Parachute Riggers-Jumpers, Inc., which was formed in the 1930s.

== Functions ==
USPA performs the following functions:

- Issues sport skydiving licenses (License classes A through D)
- Publishes and maintains skydiving training manuals and course guidelines from which instructional ratings are issued
- Serves as legal advocate and political lobbyist for skydiving
- Provides third-party insurance for skydivers
- Maintains the Basic Safety Requirements (BSRs) as a set of voluntarily followed safety guidelines
- Coordinates skydiving competitions and awards
- Issues awards for longevity, skill and achievement
- Publishes Parachutist, a monthly magazine for members

In November 2020, USPA announced their plans for a National Skydiving Museum to be built in central Florida, but didn't specify a timeframe for completion.

== See also ==
- Canadian Sport Parachuting Association
- Parachute Industry Association
- Skydiving regulation in the United States
