= Museum of History in Granite =

Museum in Felicity, California

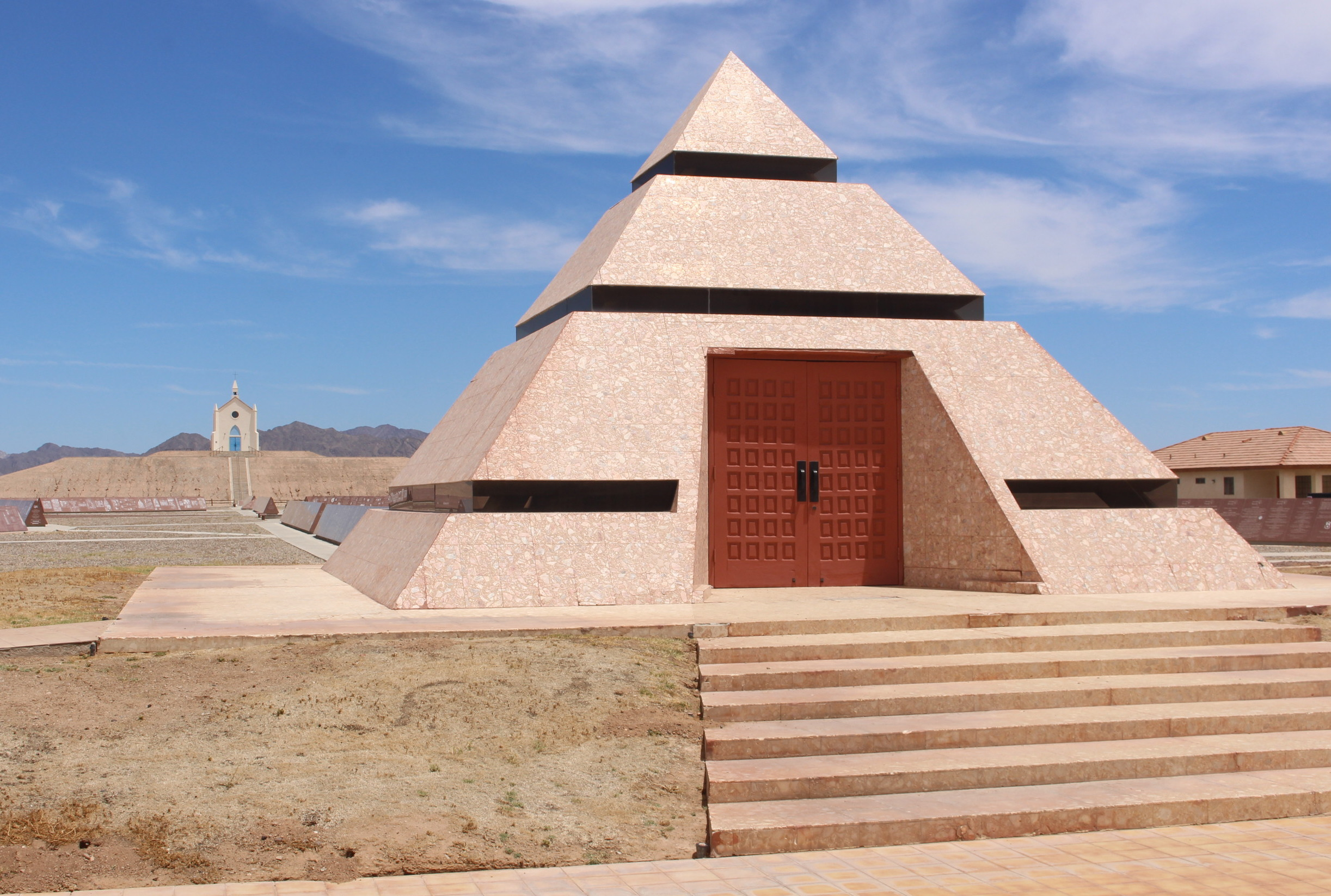
Center of the World exhibit at the Museum of History in Granite

The Museum of History in Granite is a museum in the town of Felicity, California, United States. The museum exhibits monuments made from Missouri Red Granite. Each is 100 feet (30 m) long. Conceived as a historic record of humanity designed to last for four millennia, the Museum of History in Granite is a collection of over 900 large granite outdoor panels. The museum was conceived and commissioned by Jacques-André Istel and its lead artist is Gene Britton.

Development has been underway for several decades with most of the monuments completed. However the eight monuments of the "History of Humanity" are only 31% engraved.

Subjects include the History of California, dedicated in 2016. Smaller monuments include the Felicity Stone, a "Rosetta Stone for the future" located at the center of the History of Humanity monuments.

== Exhibits ==
1. Felicity Stone (9 panels) - using a concept similar to the Rosetta Stone translation from English to several ancient languages
2. History of Humanity (416 panels - 25% complete) - Centerpiece exhibit includes Michaelangelo's Creation on panels #11-13.
3. USMC Korean War Memorial - List of the 4,617 Marines and 107 Navy Corpsmen who gave their lives during the Korean War.
4. Quest for the Sky - History of aviation (Recipient of the Air and Space Medal in Europe in 2003),
5. The History of the French Foreign Legion (51 panels)
6. The History of Arizona
7. Hall of Fame of Parachuting
8. The Wall for the Ages - record your name here for the ages
9. The History of the United States of America (62 panels) - Dedication was on Washington's Birthday 2014.
10. The History of California

== Gallery ==
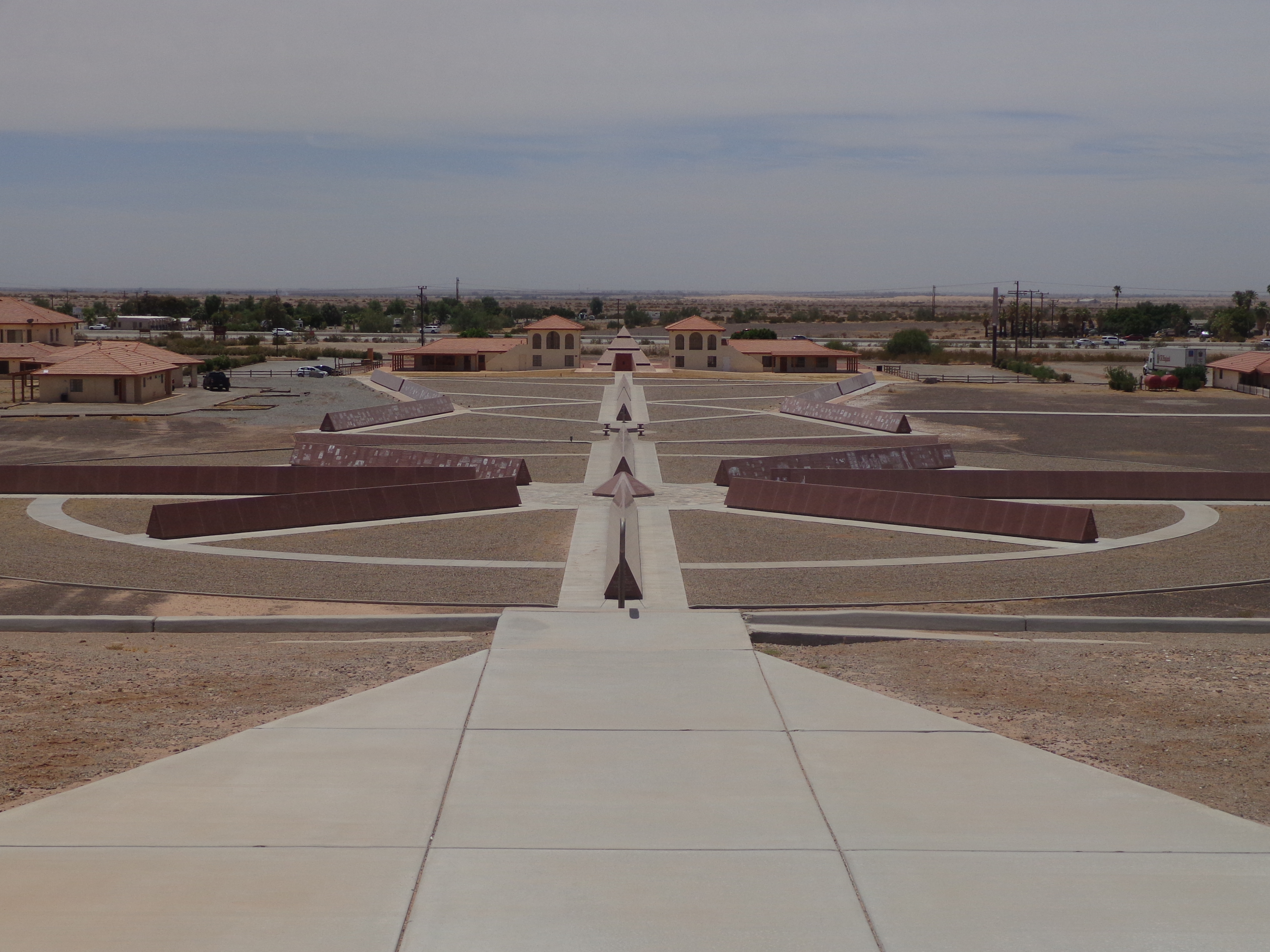
The museum, viewed from the Church on the Hill.

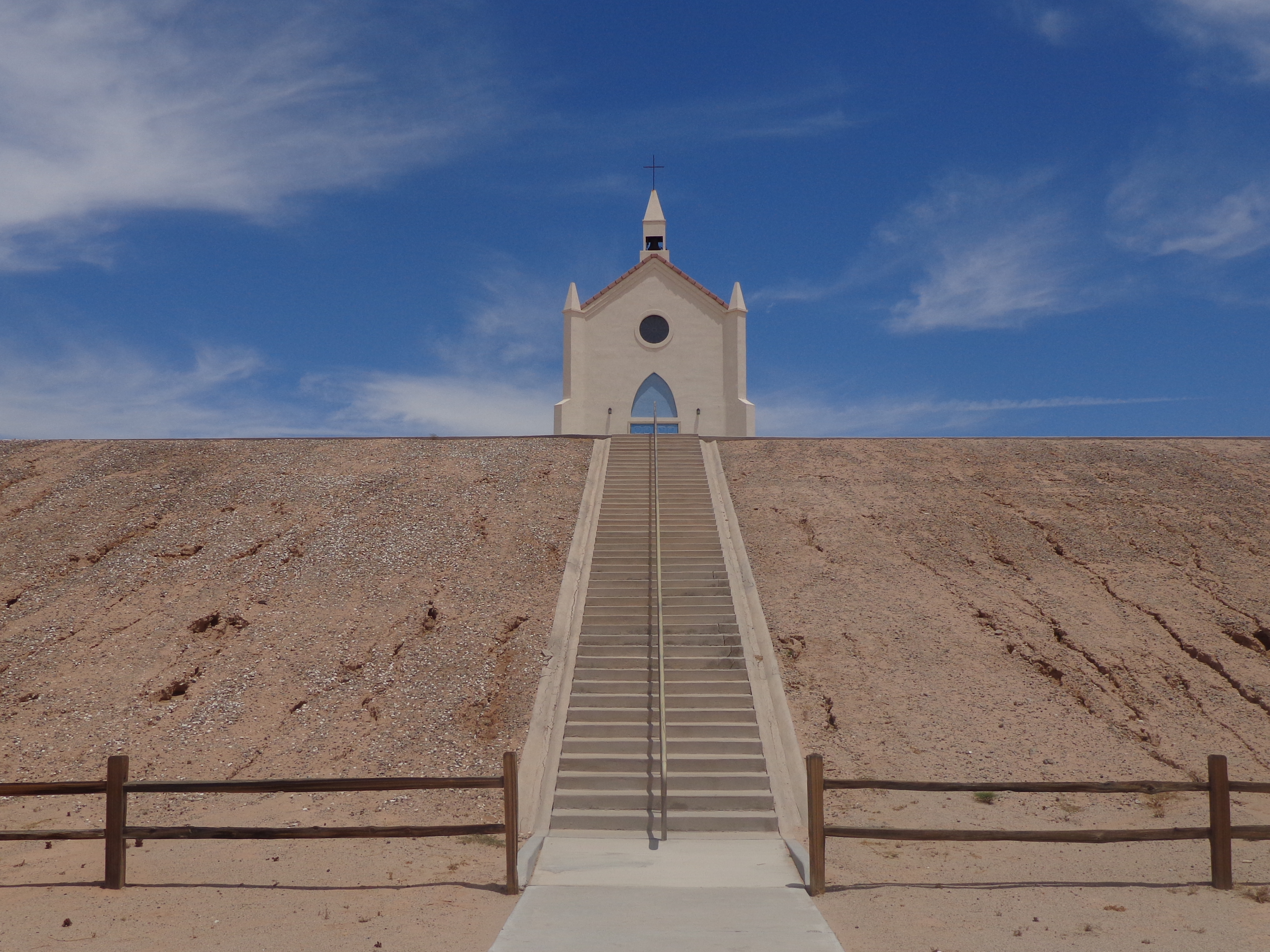
Church on the Hill.

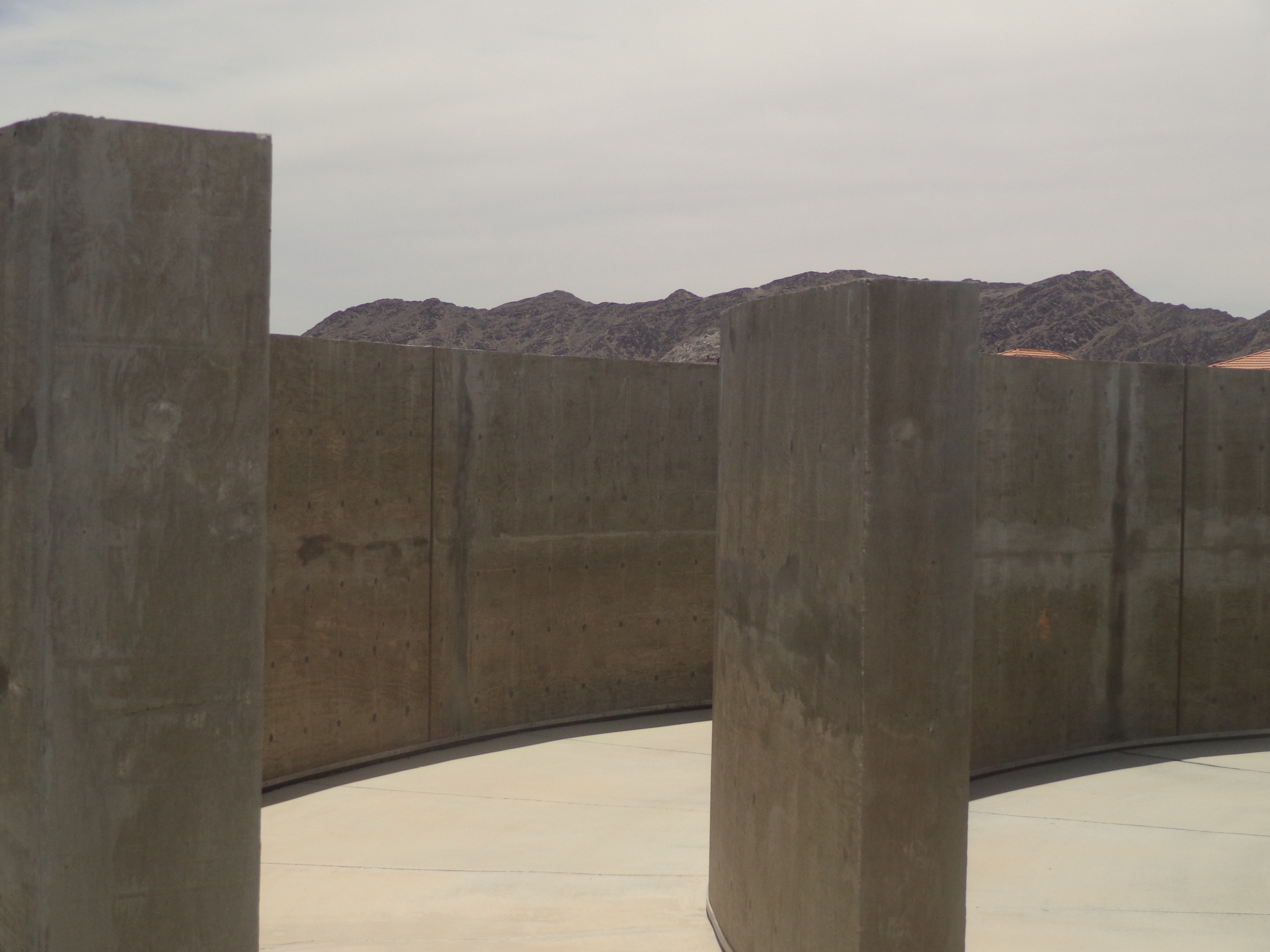
The Maze of Honor.

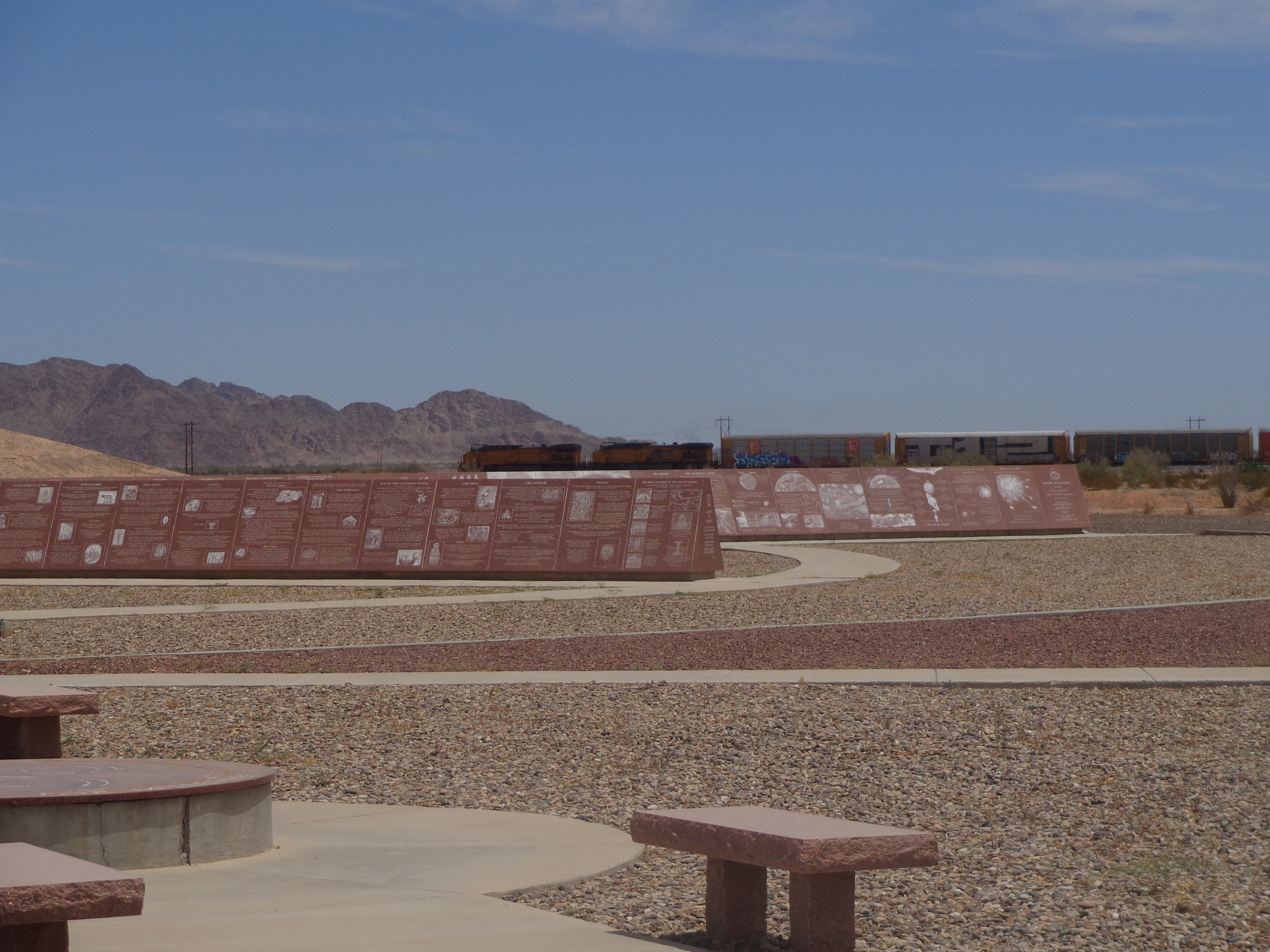
The History of Humanity.

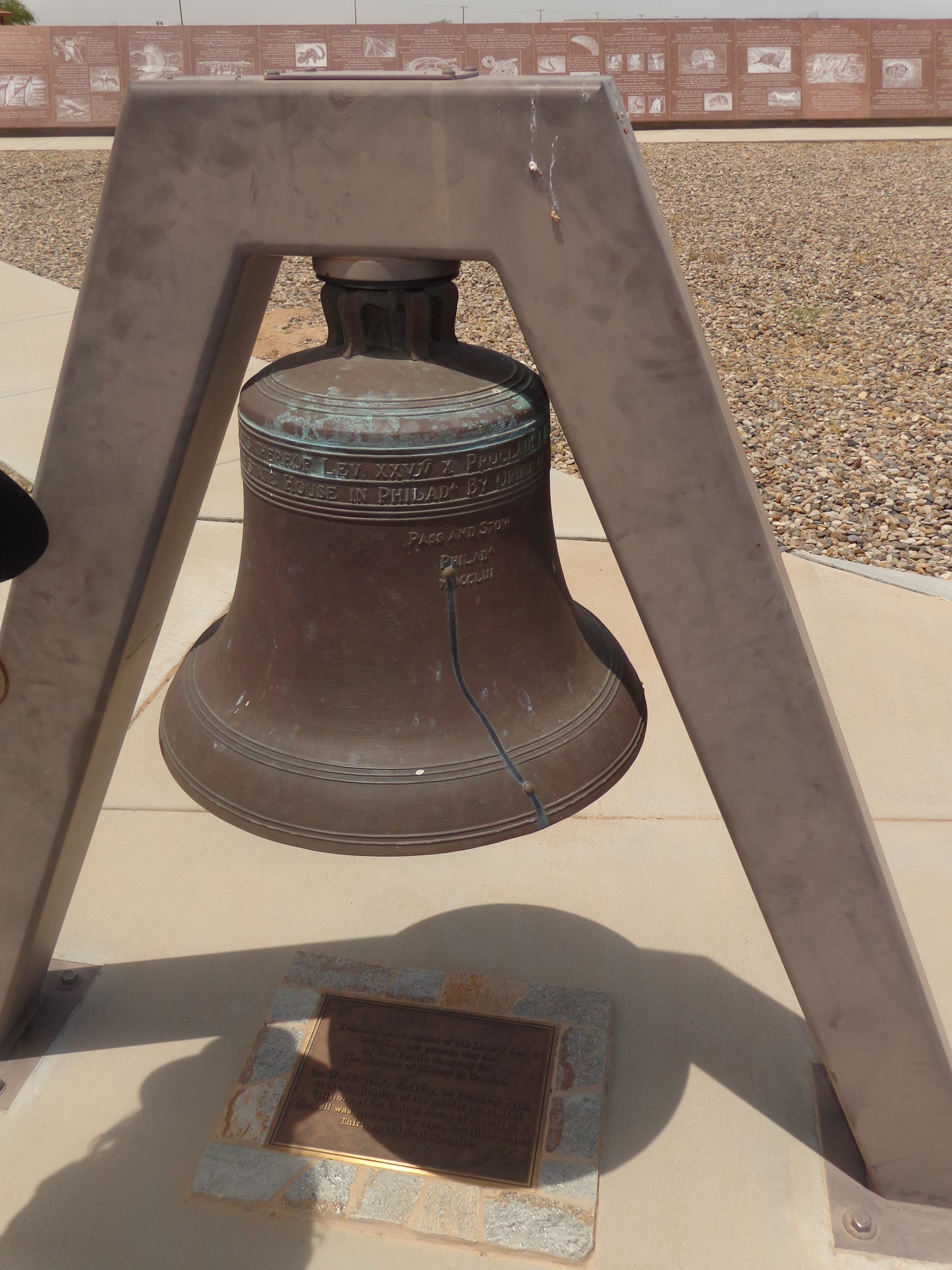
Half-scale replica of the Liberty Bell in Philadelphia.

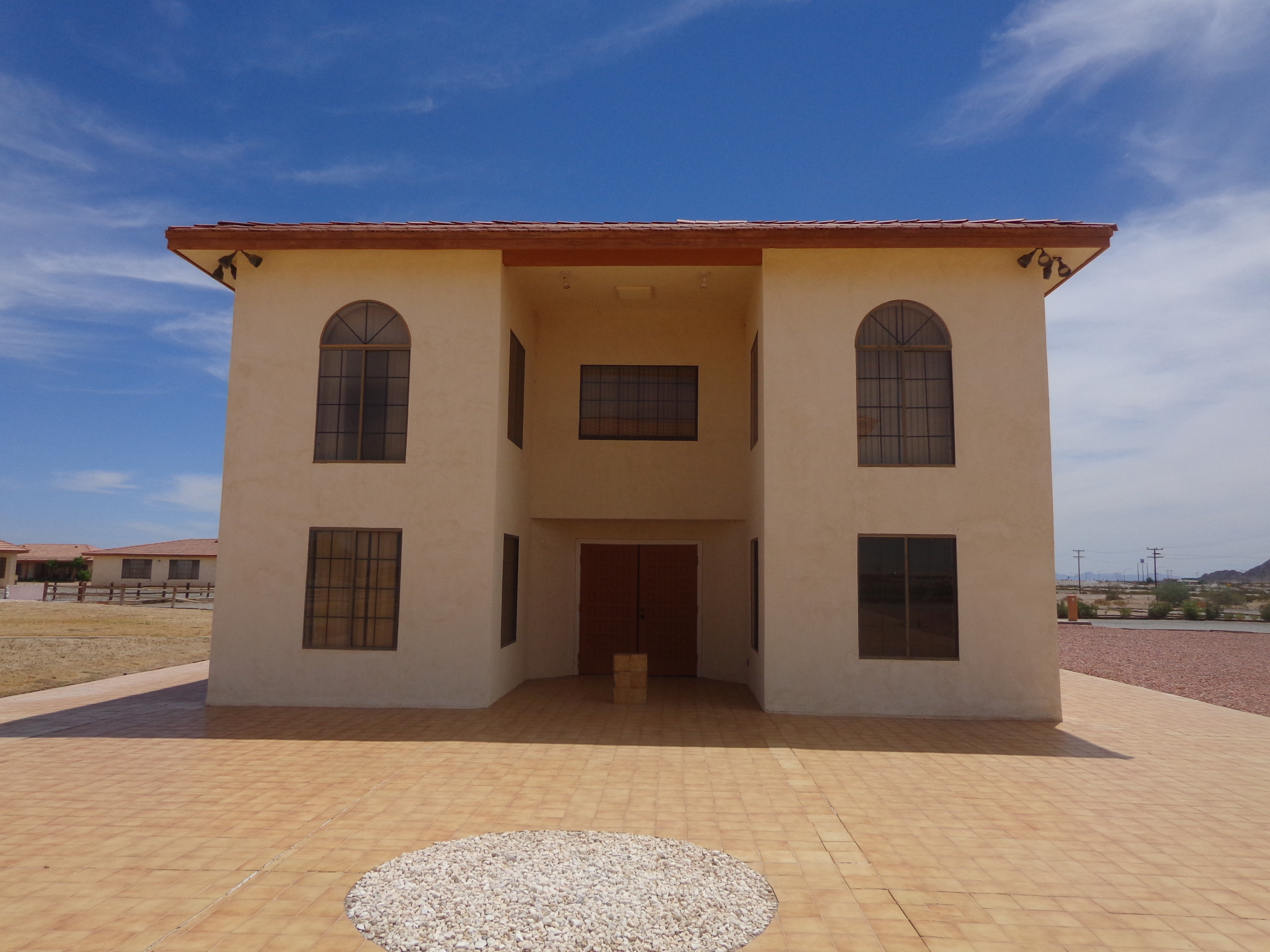
Felicity Post Office
