= Felicity, California =

Unincorporated community in California, United States

- Unincorporated community
- Location in California Felicity, California (the United States)
- Coordinates: 32°45′01″N 114°45′55″W
- Country: United States
- State: California
- County: Imperial County
- Elevation: 285 ft (87 m)

Felicity is an unincorporated community in Imperial County, California. The town was established in 1986 by Jacques-Andre Istel who bought the land in the 1950s and developed it in the 1980s after selling off his parachute business. The town is "Dedicated to Remembrance" and named for Istel's wife Felicia. It is 2,600 acres and lies at an elevation of 285 feet (87 m).

It is accessible from Interstate 8 in the far southeast of the state, just west of Yuma, Arizona.

The Quechan Tribe of the Fort Yuma Indian Reservation is located nearby. During World War II, the town was the site of Camp Pilot Knob, the US Army's training center.

The town's key features are a 21-foot-tall stone-and-glass pyramid (6.4 m), a church on a man-made hill, and the Museum of History in Granite, which Istel has been developing since the town's founding. The museum consists of dozens of granite panels, most of them over 100 feet long and weighing approximately 500 tons. Etched on the panels is a historical record of humanity as chronicled by Istel. The lead artist on the project is Gene Britton.

In May 1985, the Imperial County Board of Supervisors designated Felicity as the Official Center of the World.

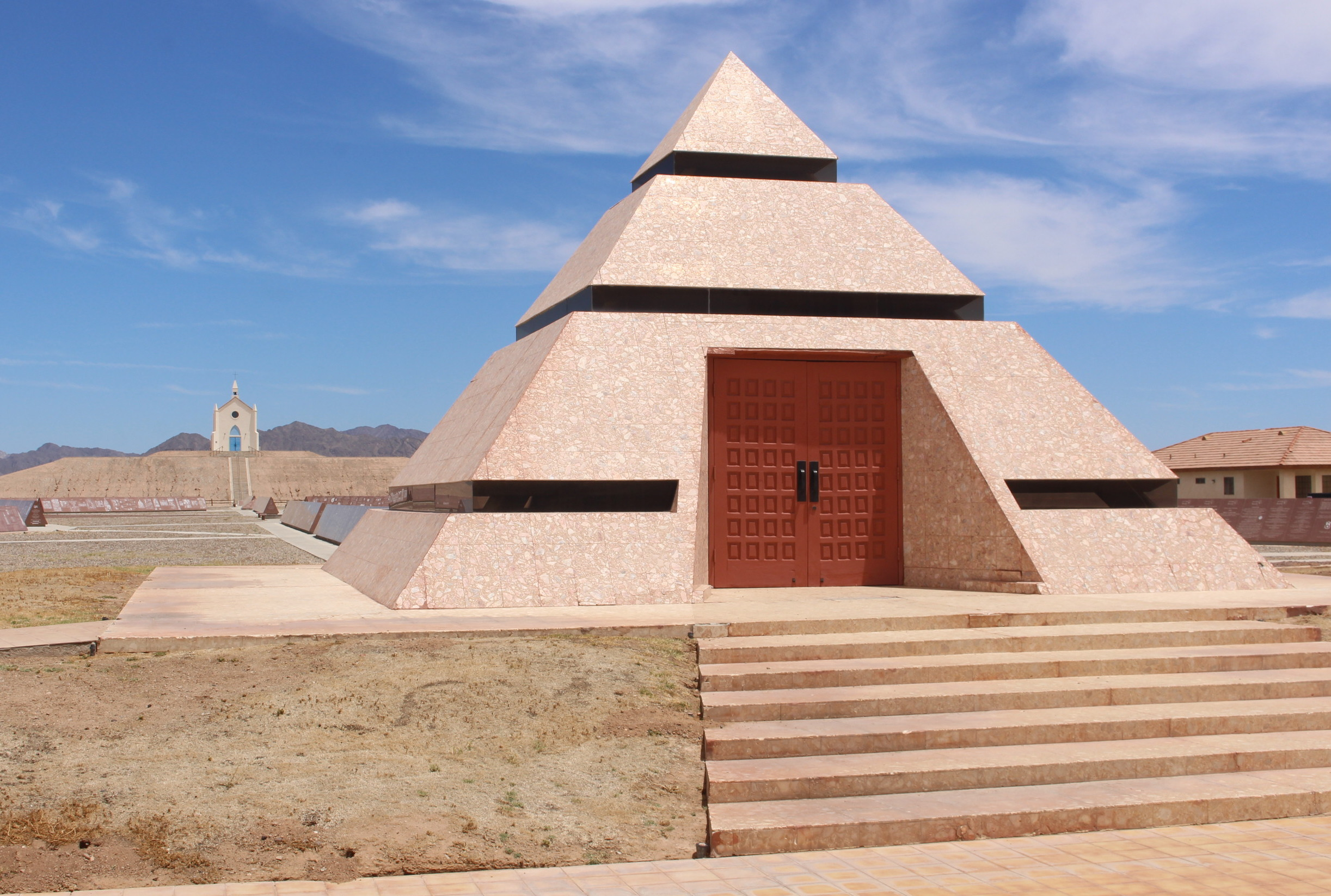
The pyramid houses the official center point.

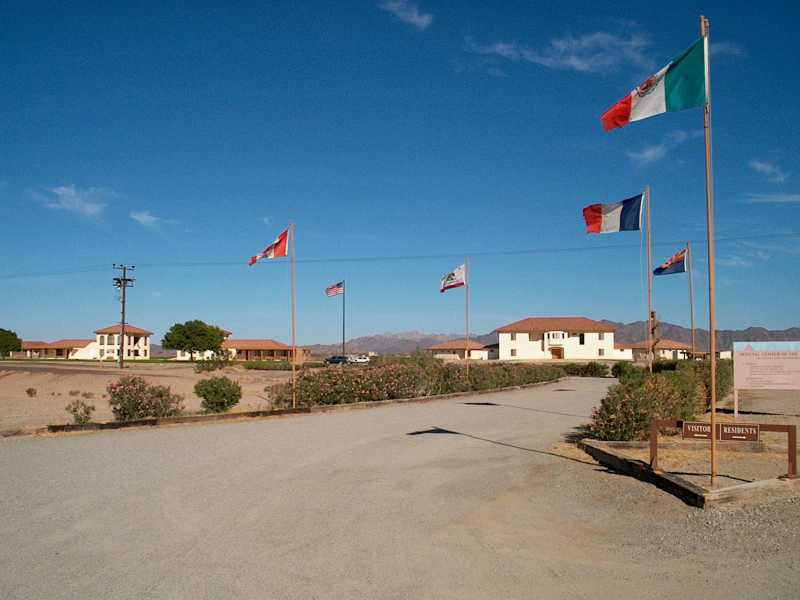
Entrance to Center of the World Plaza

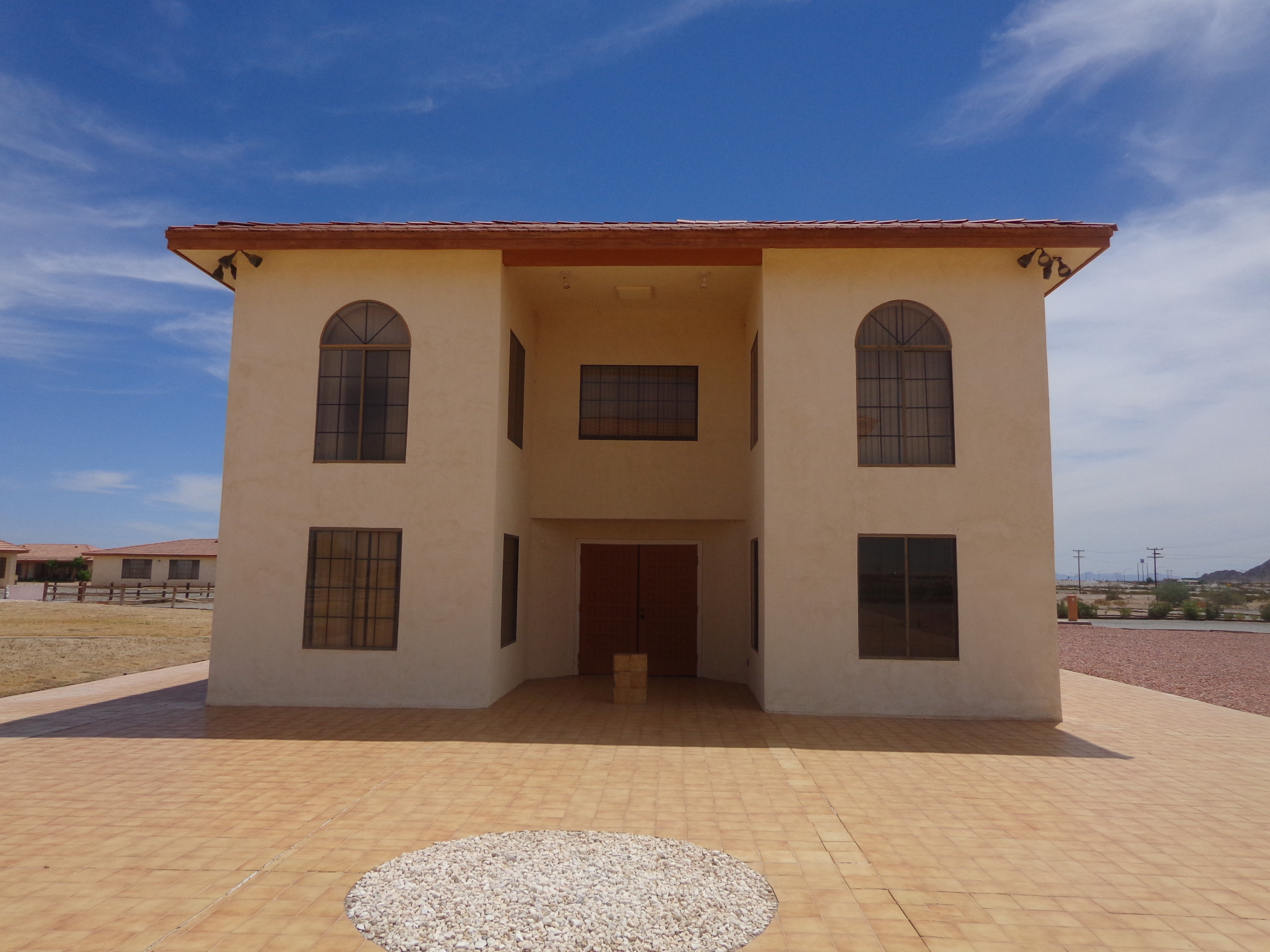
Felicity Post Office
