= Parachute Industry Association =

Business group based in Pinal County, Arizona

- Formation: January 1977; 49 years ago
- Type: Nonprofit
- Purpose: Parachuting advocacy
- Location: Gold Canyon, Arizona, United States
- Website: www.pia.com

The Parachute Industry Association (PIA) is a business association which seeks to advance and promote the growth, development, training, and safety of military, commercial, and sport parachutes. It consists of more than 210 companies united by a common desire to improve business opportunities in this segment of aviation. The PIA is a nonprofit organization governed by an elected Board. The Parachute Industry Association was founded in January 1977 as the Parachute Equipment Industry Association.

== Functions ==
The Parachute Industry Association actively pursues technical, safety, and promotional projects that benefit its members and the industry it serves. The purpose of the PIA is to recognize and promote the use of parachutes through public education and awareness; recognize the contribution to parachutes by its participants, suppliers, and supporters; capture forever the history of the industry via its events, equipment, and personalities; and enhance aviation safety as it pertains to the use of parachutes.

The Parachute Industry Association meets twice each year. On odd-numbered years, it hosts the International Parachute Symposium. The symposium consists of classes, displays, and a venue for other aviation organizations to meet.

The Parachute Industry Association is the custodian of more than 300 parachute specifications (thread, cloth, tape, webbing, hardware, plating, etc.). Formerly referred to as Military Specifications (Mil-Specs), these documents were turned over to the PIA when the U.S. government stopped maintaining all Mil-Specs in the mid-1990s. The PIA members meet to discuss, revise, publish, and keep these specifications up-to-date.

The PIA publishes service bulletins for the parachute industry. The PIA Library of Public Documents is a rich source of information regarding aspects of the PIA's organizational structure, parachute design, maintenance, and parachute rigging. These documents are available without charge to the public.

The PIA advises the Federal Aviation Administration on parachute regulations. The PIA works closely with other skydiving and parachute organizations worldwide.

== See also ==
- International Skydiving Museum
- United States Parachute Association
