= Joseph John O'Connell =

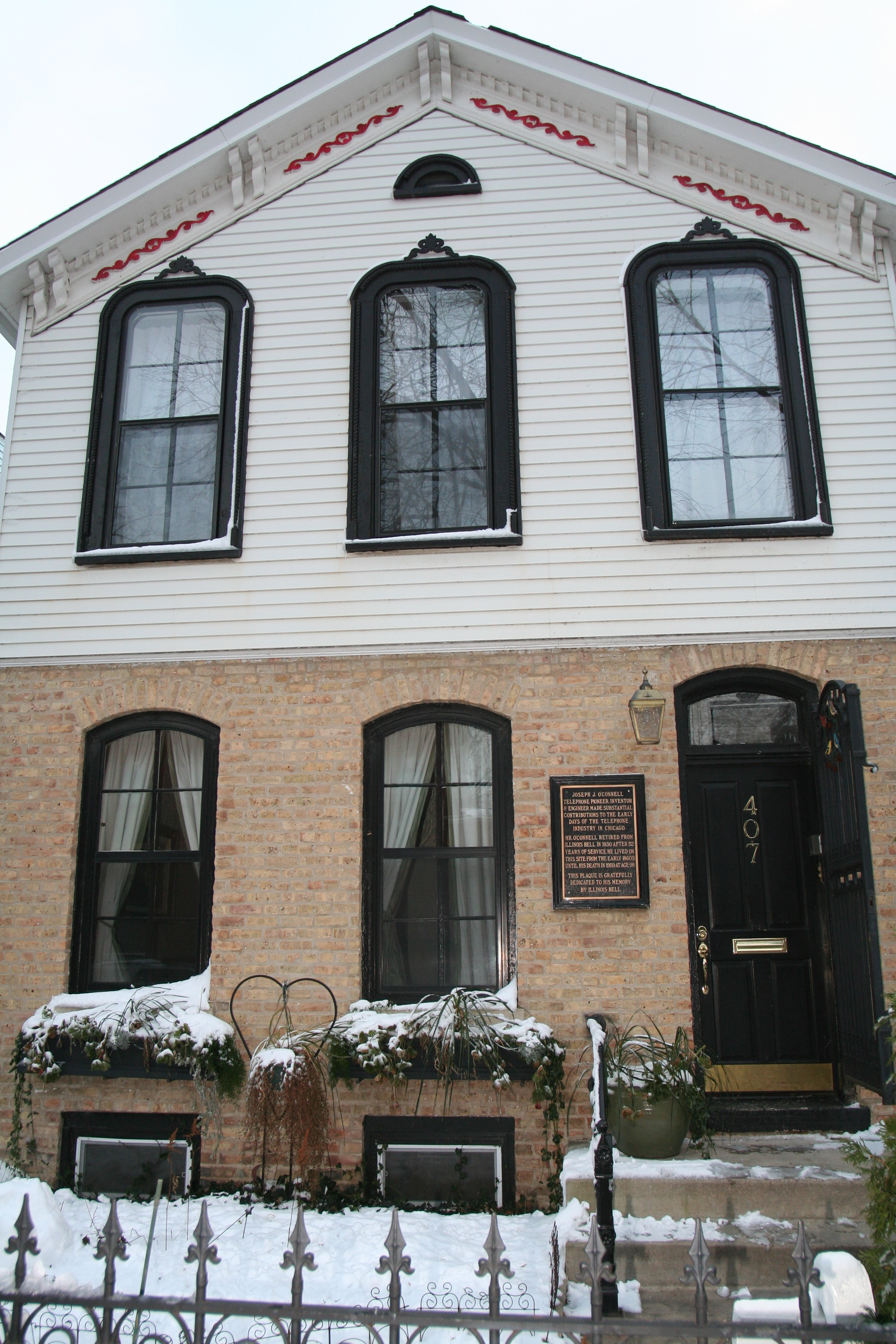
Plaque reads: "Joseph J. O'Connell Telephone pioneer, inventor, & engineer. Made substantial contributions to the early days of the telephone industry in Chicago. Mr. O'Connell retired from Illinois Bell in 1930 after 52 years of service. He lived on this site from the early 1860s until his death in 1959 at age 98. This plaque is gratefully dedicated to his memory by Illinois Bell."

Joseph John O'Connell (1861 – 1959), 1st, was an electrical engineer and inventor. He worked for the Chicago Telephone Company (which began as the Chicago Bell Telephone, Co. in 1878) in the late 19th and early 20th centuries. He had many inventions including the circuit breaker and the coin return. He also created the "invisible wire" which was the first time more than one telephone conversation could occur on the same wire. Reference to some additional inventions are mentioned in Angus Hibbard's autobiography, Hello- Goodbye including an electric lamp as a signal in a burglar-alarm operated by the telephone company in 1886. He was of Irish ancestry.

== Inventions ==
O'Connell's inventions include:

- Telephone exchange apparatus, US Patent No. 417,271, dated Dec 17, 1889
- Testing apparatus for telephone exchange switches, US Patent No. 420,091, patented January 28, 1890
- Telephone-exchange apparatus, US Patent No. 430,747, dated June 24, 1890
- Telephone-exchange key board apparatus, US Patent No. 430,748, dated June 24, 1890.
- Metallic circuit test and time signal for telephone exchanges, US Patent No. 454,016, dated June 9, 1891
- Telephone switching apparatus and circuit, US Patent No. 533,015, dated January 22, 1894
- Switch and circuit for telephone exchanges, US Patent No. 515,531, dated Feb 27, 1894
- Signaling apparatus for telephone exchange circuits, US Patent No. 587,226, dated July 30, 1895
- Telephone exchange apparatus, US Patent No. 544,901, dated Aug 20,1895
- Signaling circuit, US Patent No. 555,707, dated Mar 3, 1896 (reissued Oct 20, 1897)
- Telephone trunk circuit, US Patent No. 587,226, dated July 27, 1897
- Signaling apparatus for telephone switchboards, US Patent No.652,977, dated July 3, 1900
- Apparatus for telephone switchboards, US patent No. 645,758, dated July 31, 1900
- Calling apparatus for party telephone-lines, US patent No. 647,515, dated May 21, 1901
- Coin collector for telephone toll lines, US Patent No. 704,268, dated July 8, 1902
- Cable terminal, US Patent No. 727, 829, dated May 12, 1903
- Telephone exchange system, US Patent No. 730,291, dated June 9, 1903
- Busy test apparatus for telephone switchboards, US Patent No. 736,002, dated Aug 11, 1903
- Earth or ground wire attachment, US Patent No. 762,341, dated June 14, 1904
- Apparatus for amplifying or reinforcing telephone currents, US Patent No, 760,143, dated May 17, 1904

== Family ==
Grandson, Joseph John O'Connell 3rd, was a sculptor, print maker, photographer, artist-in-residence and teacher at CSB/SJU from 1962 to 1995.
