= Joseph J. O'Connell =

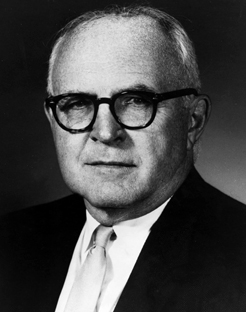
Joseph J. O'Connell as NTSB Chair

Joseph J. O'Connell Jr. (1905 – July 13, 1983), also known as J. J. O'Connell, was an American lawyer and government official who served as chairman of the Civil Aeronautics Board (CAB), and as the first chairman of the National Transportation Safety Board (NTSB).

Born in Saranac Lake, New York, O'Connell received a Bachelor of Science degree from the University of Vermont in 1926 and a law degree from Fordham University School of Law in 1930. In 1933, he became an attorney for the Public Works Administration, one of the earliest New Deal agencies. From 1938 to 1947, he worked in the United States Department of the Treasury, becoming assistant general counsel in 1941 and general counsel in 1944.

In March 1948, President Harry S. Truman named O'Connell chairman of the Civil Aeronautics Board, following a period of vacancy following the departure of James M. Landis from the post. O'Connell remained in that position until 1950, and then returned to the private practice of law, including a stint as chairman of Lake Central Airlines, beginning in 1955. In 1967, President Lyndon B. Johnson appointed him as the first chairman of the newly created National Transportation Safety Board. O'Connell held this position until Richard Nixon replaced him in May 1969. O'Connell was described as "a party loyalist who had a reputation for competence and hard work" and was credited with establishing the NTSB's reputation for independence and professionalism in investigating transportation accidents.

O'Connell married Hazel Ashmore, with whom he had two daughters. He died of a heart attack at his home in Delray Beach, Florida, at the age of 77.
