= International Skydiving Museum =

Coordinates: 38.23059°N 77.49953°W

International Skydiving Museum & Hall of Fame
- Founder: Bill Ottley
- Type: Nonprofit
- Purpose: Skydiving and parachute advocacy
- Location: Central Florida, United States
- Key people: Honorary Chairman of the Board, George H. W. Bush; Honorary President, Lewis B. Sanborn
- Website: http://www.skydivingmuseum.org

The International Skydiving Museum & Hall of Fame is a 501(c)(3) not-for-profit corporation governed by a board of trustees. Equipment and documents relating to the sport of skydiving are being collected, inventoried, and preserved. Funds are being raised to build the museum in Central Florida.

== History ==
The American Museum of Sport Parachuting & Air Safety - today the International Skydiving Museum & Hall of Fame - was established by William H Ottley in 1972.

== Functions ==
The purpose of the International Skydiving Museum & Hall of Fame is to recognize and promote the sport of skydiving and the parachute industry through public education and awareness; recognize the contribution to skydiving by its participants, suppliers, and supporters; capture forever the history of the sport and the industry via its events, equipment, and personalities; and enhance aviation safety as it pertains to skydiving.
